= 2026 World Junior Ice Hockey Championships rosters =

Below were the rosters for teams competing in the top division of the 2026 World Junior Ice Hockey Championships.

== Group A ==
=== Germany ===
- Head coach: (Germany) Tobias Abstreiter

Pos.	No.	Player	Team	League	NHL Rights
G	1	Linus Vieillard	(United States) Spokane Chiefs	(Canada) WHL	
D	4	Max Bleicher	(Canada) Powell River Kings	(Canada) BCHL	
D	5	Fabio Kose	(Germany) Löwen Frankfurt	(Germany) DEL	
D	6	Manuel Schams	(Germany) Kassel Huskies	(Germany) DEL2	
D	7	Carlos Händel	(Canada) Halifax Mooseheads	(Canada) QMJHL	Montreal Canadiens
D	8	Max Hense	(Canada) Trail Smoke Eaters	(Canada) BCHL	
F	9	Elias Pul	(Canada) Saskatoon Blades	(Canada) WHL	
F	10	Maxim Schäfer	(Canada) Chicoutimi Saguenéens	(Canada) QMJHL	Washington Capitals
F	11	David Lewandowski	(Canada) Saskatoon Blades	(Canada) WHL	Edmonton Oilers
F	12	Tim Schütz	(Germany) Krefeld Pinguine	(Germany) DEL2	
F	14	Nick Maul	(Austria) Red Bull Hockey Juniors	(Austria) Alps Hockey League	
F	15	Mateu Spath Mariscal	(Canada) Salmon Arm Silverbacks	(Canada) BCHL	
D	16	Nick Mähler	(Germany) Eisbären Regensburg	(Germany) DEL2	
F	17	Lenny Boos	(Germany) Düsseldorfer EG	(Germany) DEL2	
D	18	Moritz Kretzschmar	(Germany) Eisbären Berlin	(Germany) DEL	
F	19	Dustin Willhoft	(Canada) Saskatoon Blades	(Canada) WHL	
F	21	Clemens Sager	(Germany) Kassel Huskies	(Germany) DEL2	
F	22	Timo Kose	(Germany) Löwen Frankfurt	(Germany) DEL	
D	23	Matthias Pape	(Canada) Trail Smoke Eaters	(Canada) BCHL	
F	24	Elias Schneider	(Canada) Shawinigan Cataractes	(Canada) QMJHL	
F	25	Tobias Schwarz	(Germany) Straubing Tigers	(Germany) DEL	
F	27	Simon Seidl	(Germany) Straubing Tigers	(Germany) DEL	
F	28	Gustavs Griva	(United States) Madison Capitols	(United States) USHL	
G	29	Lennart Neisse	(Germany) Eisbären Berlin	(Germany) DEL	
G	30	Lukas Stuhrmann	(Finland) RoKi U20	(Finland) U20 SM-sarja	

=== Slovakia ===
- Head coach: (Slovakia) Peter Frühauf

Pos.	No.	Player	Team	League	NHL Rights
G	1	Michal Prádel	(United States) Tri-City Storm	(United States) USHL	Detroit Red Wings
G	2	Roberto Leonardo Henriquez	(United States) Green Bay Gamblers	(United States) USHL	
D	5	Filip Kovalčík	(Canada) Drummondville Voltigeurs	(Canada) QMJHL	
D	6	Michal Čapoš	(United States) Wenatchee Wild	(Canada) WHL	
D	7	Adam Kálman	(Slovakia) HK Nitra	(Slovakia) Slovak Extraliga	
F	8	Michal Liščinský	(Slovakia) HC Košice	(Slovakia) Slovak Extraliga	
F	10	Tomáš Pobežal	(Canada) Kingston Frontenacs	(Canada) OHL	
F	11	Michal Svrček	(Sweden) Brynäs IF	(Sweden) SHL	Detroit Red Wings
F	12	Ján Chovan	(Canada) Sudbury Wolves	(Canada) OHL	Los Angeles Kings
F	13	Tobiáš Tomík	(Canada) Vancouver Giants	(Canada) WHL	
F	14	Alex Mišiak	(United States) Erie Otters	(Canada) OHL	
F	15	Andreas Straka	(Canada) Quebec Remparts	(Canada) QMJHL	
D	16	Matúš Lisý	(Canada) Red Deer Rebels	(Canada) WHL	
F	18	Samuel Murín	(United States) Tri-City Storm	(United States) USHL	
F	19	Alex Gaso	(Czech Republic) Mountfield HK U20	(Czech Republic) U20 ELH	
F	21	Adam Nemec	(Slovakia) HK Nitra	(Slovakia) Slovak Extraliga	Ottawa Senators
D	22	Adam Goljer	(Slovakia) HK Dukla Trenčín	(Slovakia) Slovak Extraliga	Los Angeles Kings
F	23	Jakub Dubravík	(Slovakia) Vlci Žilina	(Slovakia) Slovak Extraliga	
F	24	Lukáš Tomka	(Slovakia) HC 05 Banská Bystrica	(Slovakia) Slovak Extraliga	
D	25	Andrej Fabuš	(Slovakia) HC Slovan Bratislava	(Slovakia) Slovak Extraliga	
D	26	Luka Radivojevič	(United States) Boston College	(United States) Hockey East	
D	27	Adam Beluško	(United States) Muskegon Lumberjacks	(United States) USHL	
F	28	Tobiáš Pitka	(United States) Northern Michigan University	(United States) CCHA	
F	29	Tomáš Chrenko	(Slovakia) HK Nitra	(Slovakia) Slovak Extraliga	New York Rangers
G	30	Alan Lendák	(United States) Fargo Force	(United States) USHL	

=== Sweden ===
- Head coach: (Sweden) Magnus Hävelid

Pos.	No.	Player	Team	League	NHL Rights
G	1	Herman Liv	(Sweden) Örebro HK	(Sweden) SHL	
D	3	Felix Öhrqvist	(Sweden) Linköping HC	(Sweden) SHL	
D	4	Leo Sahlin Wallenius	(Sweden) Växjö Lakers	(Sweden) SHL	San Jose Sharks
D	5	Sascha Boumedienne	(United States) Boston University	(United States) Hockey East	Winnipeg Jets
D	7	Viggo Gustafsson	(Sweden) HV71	(Sweden) SHL	Nashville Predators
D	8	Felix Carell	(Sweden) Malmö Redhawks	(Sweden) SHL	
D	9	Victor Johansson	(Sweden) Leksands IF	(Sweden) SHL	Toronto Maple Leafs
F	11	Lucas Pettersson	(Sweden) Brynäs IF	(Sweden) SHL	Anaheim Ducks
F	12	Milton Gästrin	(Sweden) Modo Hockey	(Sweden) HockeyAllsvenskan	Washington Capitals
F	14	Linus Eriksson	(Sweden) Timrå IK	(Sweden) SHL	Florida Panthers
F	15	Ivar Stenberg	(Sweden) Frölunda HC	(Sweden) SHL	San Jose Sharks
F	16	Anton Frondell	(Sweden) Djurgårdens IF	(Sweden) SHL	Chicago Blackhawks
F	18	Victor Eklund	(Sweden) Djurgårdens IF	(Sweden) SHL	New York Islanders
D	19	William Håkansson	(Sweden) Luleå HF	(Sweden) SHL	Carolina Hurricanes
D	20	Alfons Freij	(Sweden) Timrå IK	(Sweden) SHL	Winnipeg Jets
F	21	Viggo Björck	(Sweden) Djurgårdens IF	(Sweden) SHL	Winnipeg Jets
F	22	Loke Krantz	(Sweden) Linköping HC	(Sweden) SHL	Seattle Kraken
F	23	Liam Danielsson	(Sweden) Örebro HK	(Sweden) SHL	
F	25	Eddie Genborg	(Sweden) Timrå IK	(Sweden) SHL	Detroit Red Wings
F	26	Jack Berglund	(Sweden) Färjestad BK	(Sweden) SHL	Philadelphia Flyers
F	27	Wilson Björck	(United States) Colorado College	(United States) NCHC	Vancouver Canucks
F	28	Eric Nilson	(United States) Michigan State University	(United States) B1G	Anaheim Ducks
F	29	Casper Juustovaara Karlsson	(Sweden) Luleå HF	(Sweden) SHL	
G	30	Love Härenstam	(Sweden) Södertälje SK	(Sweden) HockeyAllsvenskan	St. Louis Blues
G	35	Måns Goos	(Sweden) Färjestad BK	(Sweden) SHL	Dallas Stars

=== Switzerland ===
- Head coach: (Switzerland) Jan Cadieux

Pos.	No.	Player	Team	League	NHL Rights
D	6	Mischa Geisser	(Switzerland) EV Zug	(Switzerland) National League	
F	7	Cyrill Henry	(Switzerland) HC Lugano	(Switzerland) National League	
D	8	Gian Meier	(Sweden) Frölunda HC	(Sweden) J20 Nationell	
F	11	Nathan Borradori	(Switzerland) HC Ambrì-Piotta	(Switzerland) National League	
D	13	Basile Sansonnens	(Switzerland) Lausanne HC	(Switzerland) National League	Vancouver Canucks
D	14	Niklas Blessing	(Switzerland) EHC Biel	(Switzerland) National League	
F	15	Lars Steiner	(Canada) Rouyn-Noranda Huskies	(Canada) QMJHL	St. Louis Blues
F	16	Kevin Haas	(Switzerland) HC Thurgau	(Switzerland) Swiss League	
F	19	Jonah Neuenschwander	(Switzerland) EHC Biel	(Switzerland) National League	
D	26	Ludvig Johnson	(Switzerland) Fribourg-Gottéron	(Switzerland) National League	Utah Mammoth
D	28	Daniil Ustinkov	(Switzerland) GCK Lions	(Switzerland) Swiss League	
G	29	Phileas Lachat	(United States) Waterloo Blackhawks	(United States) USHL	
G	35	Elijah Neuenschwander	(Switzerland) HC Fribourg-Gottéron	(Switzerland) National League	Anaheim Ducks
D	41	Leon Muggli	(United States) Hershey Bears	(United States) AHL	Washington Capitals
F	62	Mike Aeschlimann	(Switzerland) SCL Tigers	(Switzerland) National League	
G	65	Christian Kirsch	(Canada) Kitchener Rangers	(Canada) OHL	San Jose Sharks
F	71	Beni Waidacher	(Switzerland) HC Davos	(Switzerland) National League	
D	77	Loris Wey	(Switzerland) EV Zug	(Switzerland) National League	
F	78	Joel Grossniklaus	(Sweden) Malmö Redhawks	(Sweden) J20 Nationell	
F	88	Robin Antenen	(Switzerland) EV Zug	(Switzerland) National League	
F	89	Kimi Koerbler	(Switzerland) EHC Kloten	(Switzerland) National League	
D	94	Nik Lehmann	(Switzerland) SCL Tigers	(Switzerland) National League	
F	96	Paul Mottard	(Finland) Ilves	(Finland) Liiga	

=== United States ===
- Head coach: (United States) Bob Motzko

Pos.	No.	Player	Team	League	NHL Rights
D	2	Luke Osburn	(United States) University of Wisconsin	(United States) B1G	Buffalo Sabres
F	4	Teddy Stiga	(United States) Boston College	(United States) Hockey East	Nashville Predators
D	5	Logan Hensler	(United States) University of Wisconsin	(United States) B1G	Ottawa Senators
D	6	Adam Kleber	(United States) University of Minnesota Duluth	(United States) NCHC	Buffalo Sabres
D	7	Dakoda Rhéaume-Mullen	(United States) University of Michigan	(United States) B1G	
F	8	Anthony Spellacy	(Canada) Windsor Spitfires	(Canada) OHL	Chicago Blackhawks
F	10	James Hagens	(United States) Boston College	(United States) Hockey East	Boston Bruins
F	11	Cole McKinney	(United States) University of Michigan	(United States) B1G	San Jose Sharks
F	12	Will Zellers	(United States) University of North Dakota	(United States) NCHC	Boston Bruins
D	14	Asher Barnett	(United States) University of Michigan	(United States) B1G	Edmonton Oilers
D	16	E. J. Emery	(United States) University of North Dakota	(United States) NCHC	New York Rangers
F	17	Ryker Lee	(United States) Michigan State University	(United States) B1G	Nashville Predators
F	18	L. J. Mooney	(United States) University of Minnesota	(United States) B1G	Montreal Canadiens
F	22	Brendan McMorrow	(United States) University of Denver	(United States) NCHC	Los Angeles Kings
F	23	Shane Vansaghi	(United States) Michigan State University	(United States) B1G	Philadelphia Flyers
F	24	Will Horcoff	(United States) University of Michigan	(United States) B1G	Pittsburgh Penguins
D	25	Chase Reid	(Canada) Sault Ste. Marie Greyhounds	(Canada) OHL	Seattle Kraken
F	26	Max Plante	(United States) University of Minnesota Duluth	(United States) NCHC	Detroit Red Wings
G	30	Caleb Heil	(United States) Madison Capitols	(United States) USHL	Tampa Bay Lightning
G	31	Nicholas Kempf	(United States) University of Notre Dame	(United States) B1G	Washington Capitals
G	35	Brady Knowling	(United States) U.S. NTDP	(United States) USHL	San Jose Sharks
F	34	Cole Eiserman	(United States) Boston University	(United States) Hockey East	New York Islanders
F	38	Kamil Bednarik	(United States) Boston University	(United States) Hockey East	New York Islanders
D	44	Cole Hutson	(United States) Boston University	(United States) Hockey East	Washington Capitals
F	74	Brodie Ziemer	(United States) University of Minnesota	(United States) B1G	Buffalo Sabres

== Group B ==
=== Canada ===
- Head coach: (Canada) Dale Hunter

Pos.	No.	Player	Team	League	NHL Rights
G	1	Jack Ivankovic	(United States) University of Michigan	(United States) B1G	Nashville Predators
G	30	Carter George	(Canada) Owen Sound Attack	(Canada) OHL	Los Angeles Kings
G	31	Joshua Ravensbergen	(Canada) Prince George Cougars	(Canada) WHL	San Jose Sharks
D	2	Kashawn Aitcheson	(Canada) Barrie Colts	(Canada) OHL	New York Islanders
D	4	Harrison Brunicke	(United States) Pittsburgh Penguins	(United States) NHL	Pittsburgh Penguins
D	5	Carson Carels	(Canada) Prince George Cougars	(Canada) WHL	Calgary Flames
D	6	Ben Danford	(Canada) Brantford Bulldogs	(Canada) OHL	Toronto Maple Leafs
D	8	Ethan MacKenzie	(Canada) Edmonton Oil Kings	(Canada) WHL	Toronto Maple Leafs
D	10	Cameron Reid	(Canada) Kitchener Rangers	(Canada) OHL	Nashville Predators
D	12	Zayne Parekh	(Canada) Calgary Flames	(Canada) NHL	Calgary Flames
D	14	Keaton Verhoeff	(United States) University of North Dakota	(United States) NCHC	San Jose Sharks
F	7	Michael Misa	(United States) San Jose Sharks	(United States) NHL	San Jose Sharks
F	8	Braeden Cootes	(United States) Seattle Thunderbirds	(Canada) WHL	Vancouver Canucks
F	9	Gavin McKenna	(United States) Penn State University	(United States) B1G	Toronto Maple Leafs
F	11	Tij Iginla	(Canada) Kelowna Rockets	(Canada) WHL	Utah Mammoth
F	17	Jett Luchanko	(Canada) Brantford Bulldogs	(Canada) OHL	Philadelphia Flyers
F	19	Carter Bear	(United States) Everett Silvertips	(Canada) WHL	Detroit Red Wings
F	21	Cole Reschny	(United States) University of North Dakota	(United States) NCHC	Calgary Flames
F	22	Porter Martone	(United States) Michigan State University	(United States) B1G	Philadelphia Flyers
F	23	Sam O’Reilly	(Canada) London Knights	(Canada) OHL	Tampa Bay Lightning
F	24	Liam Greentree	(Canada) Windsor Spitfires	(Canada) OHL	Los Angeles Kings
F	25	Caleb Desnoyers	(Canada) Moncton Wildcats	(Canada) QMJHL	Utah Mammoth
F	26	Cole Beaudoin	(Canada) Barrie Colts	(Canada) OHL	Utah Mammoth
F	28	Brady Martin	(Canada) Sault Ste. Marie Greyhounds	(Canada) OHL	Nashville Predators
F	29	Michael Hage	(United States) Michigan Wolverines	(United States) B1G	Montreal Canadiens

=== Czechia ===
- Head coach: (Czech Republic) Patrik Augusta

Pos.	No.	Player	Team	League	NHL Rights
G	1	Matyáš Mařík	(Czech Republic) HC Motor České Budějovice	(Czech Republic) ELH	
G	2	Ondřej Štěbeták	(United States) Portland Winterhawks	(Canada) WHL	
G	30	Michal Oršulák	(Canada) Prince Albert Raiders	(Canada) WHL	Detroit Red Wings
D	3	Max Pšenička	(United States) Portland Winterhawks	(Canada) WHL	Utah Mammoth
D	5	Adam Jiříček	(Canada) Brantford Bulldogs	(Canada) OHL	St. Louis Blues
D	6	Radim Mrtka	(United States) Seattle Thunderbirds	(Canada) WHL	Buffalo Sabres
D	7	Jakub Fibigr	(Canada) Brampton Steelheads	(Canada) OHL	Seattle Kraken
D	8	Matyáš Man	(Canada) Prince Albert Raiders	(Canada) WHL	
D	9	Vladimír Dravecký	(Sweden) Rögle BK	(Sweden) SHL	
D	23	Tomáš Galvas	(Czech Republic) Bílí Tygři Liberec	(Czech Republic) ELH	Pittsburgh Penguins
F	11	Matěj Kubiesa	(Czech Republic) HC Oceláři Třinec	(Czech Republic) ELH	
F	12	Maxmilian Curran	(Canada) Edmonton Oil Kings	(Canada) WHL	Colorado Avalanche
F	14	Václav Nestrašil	(United States) University of Massachusetts Amherst	(United States) Hockey East	Chicago Blackhawks
F	15	Vojtěch Čihař	(Czech Republic) HC Energie Karlovy Vary	(Czech Republic) ELH	Los Angeles Kings
F	16	Richard Žemlička	(Finland) SaiPa Lappeenranta	(Finland) Liiga	
F	17	Petr Sikora	(Czech Republic) HC Oceláři Třinec	(Czech Republic) ELH	Washington Capitals
F	18	Tomáš Poletín	(Canada) Kelowna Rockets	(Canada) WHL	New York Islanders
F	19	Danny Chludil	(Czech Republic) HC Kometa Brno	(Czech Republic) ELH	
F	20	Adam Benák	(Canada) Brantford Bulldogs	(Canada) OHL	Minnesota Wild
F	21	Jiří Klíma	(Canada) Shawinigan Cataractes	(Canada) QMJHL	
F	22	Adam Titlbach	(Canada) Vancouver Giants	(Canada) WHL	
F	24	Adam Novotný	(Czech Republic) Mountfield HK	(Czech Republic) ELH	Vancouver Canucks
F	25	Štěpán Hoch	(Czech Republic) HC Ceske Budejovice	(Czech Republic) ELH	Utah Mammoth
F	29	Samuel Drančák	(Canada) Red Deer Rebels	(Canada) WHL	

=== Denmark ===
- Head coach: (Denmark) Martin Struzinski

Pos.	No.	Player	Team	League	NHL Rights
G	1	Anton Emil Wilde Larsen	(Denmark) Frederikshavn White Hawks	(Denmark) Metal Ligaen	Dallas Stars
D	3	Jeppe Kramer	(Denmark) Herlev Eagles	(Denmark) Metal Ligaen	
D	5	Markus Jakobsen	(United States) Sioux Falls Stampede	(United States) USHL	
D	6	Emil Saaby Jakobsen	(Sweden) Karlskrona HK	(Sweden) HockeyAllsvenskan	
D	7	Frederik Rundh	(Sweden) Olofströms IK	(Sweden) Hockeyettan	
D	8	Jesper Bank Olesen	(Denmark) Herning Blue Fox	(Denmark) Metal Ligaen	
F	9	Tristan Petersen	(Canada) Penticton Vees	(Canada) WHL	
F	10	Sebastian Strømstad	(Denmark) Rødovre Mighty Bulls	(Denmark) Metal Ligaen	
D	11	Frederick Amondsen	(Denmark) Rødovre Mighty Bulls	(Denmark) Metal Ligaen	
F	12	Albert Grossmann	(Denmark) Vojens IK	(Denmark) Metal Ligaen	
F	13	Oliver Green	(Sweden) Rögle BK	(Sweden) J20 Nationell	
F	14	Oliver Dejbjerg Larsen	(Sweden) Malmö Redhawks	(Sweden) J20 Nationell	
F	16	Andrew Christian Bjergstad	(United States) Lone Star Brahmas	(United States) NAHL	
F	17	Lucas Cilan Hjorth Jensen	(Denmark) Aalborg Pirates	(Denmark) Metal Ligaen	
D	18	Jeppe Bertram	(Denmark) Esbjerg Energy	(Denmark) Metal Ligaen	
F	19	William Bundgaard	(Sweden) HV71	(Sweden) J20 Nationell	
F	20	Elias Borup Olsen	(Denmark) SønderjyskE Ishockey	(Denmark) Metal Ligaen	
D	21	Viggo Damgaard	(Denmark) Herning Blue Fox	(Denmark) Metal Ligaen	
F	22	Anton Linde	(Canada) Chicoutimi Saguenéens	(Canada) QMJHL	
F	23	Lasse Bærentsen	(Denmark) Herning Blue Fox	(Denmark) Metal Ligaen	
F	24	Mads Kongsbak Klyvø	(Sweden) Frölunda HC	(Sweden) J20 Nationell	Florida Panthers
F	28	Martinus Uggerhøj Schioldan	(Sweden) HV71	(Sweden) J20 Nationell	
G	31	Tobias Renner Christensen	(Denmark) Herning Blue Fox	(Denmark) Metal Ligaen	
G	35	Patrick Tiedjen	(Denmark) Rødovre Mighty Bulls	(Denmark) Metal Ligaen	

=== Finland ===
- Head coach: (Finland) Lauri Mikkola

Pos.	No.	Player	Team	League	NHL Rights
G	1	Kim Saarinen	(Finland) HPK	(Finland) Liiga	Seattle Kraken
D	2	Mitja Jokinen	(Finland) TPS	(Finland) Liiga	
D	4	Niklas Nykyri	(Finland) HIFK	(Finland) Liiga	
D	6	Juho Piiparinen	(Finland) Tappara	(Finland) Liiga	Vegas Golden Knights
D	7	Daniel Nieminen	(Finland) Lahti Pelicans	(Finland) Liiga	Nashville Predators
F	10	Roope Vesterinen	(Finland) HPK	(Finland) Liiga	
F	12	Joona Saarelainen	(Finland) KalPa	(Finland) Liiga	
D	13	Veeti Väisänen	(Canada) Medicine Hat Tigers	(Canada) WHL	Utah Mammoth
F	15	Aatos Koivu	(Finland) TPS	(Finland) Liiga	Montreal Canadiens
F	18	Onni Kalto	(Canada) Oshawa Generals	(Canada) OHL	
F	20	Kasper Pikkarainen	(Finland) TPS	(Finland) Liiga	New Jersey Devils
F	21	Max Westergård	(Sweden) Frölunda HC	(Sweden) SHL	Philadelphia Flyers
F	22	Emil Hemming	(Canada) Barrie Colts	(Canada) OHL	Dallas Stars
F	23	Leo Tuuva	(Finland) Lukko	(Finland) Liiga	
D	25	Lasse Boelius	(Finland) Ässät	(Finland) Liiga	Anaheim Ducks
F	28	Heikki Ruohonen	(United States) Harvard University	(United States) ECAC Hockey	Philadelphia Flyers
F	29	Jasper Kuhta	(Canada) Ottawa 67's	(Canada) OHL	Dallas Stars
G	30	Petteri Rimpinen	(Finland) Kiekko-Espoo	(Finland) Liiga	Los Angeles Kings
G	31	Patrik Kerkola	(Finland) KalPa	(Finland) Liiga	
D	33	Aron Kiviharju	(Finland) HIFK	(Finland) Liiga	Minnesota Wild
D	34	Arttu Välilä	(Finland) Lukko	(Finland) Liiga	
F	35	Atte Joki	(Finland) Lukko	(Finland) Liiga	Dallas Stars
F	37	Matias Vanhanen	(United States) Everett Silvertips	(Canada) WHL	New Jersey Devils
F	38	Oliver Suvanto	(Finland) Tappara	(Finland) Liiga	Washington Capitals

=== Latvia ===
- Head coach: (Latvia) Artis Ābols

Pos.	No.	Player	Team	League	NHL Rights
G	1	Mikus Vecvanags	(Canada) Newfoundland Regiment	(Canada) QMJHL	Montreal Canadiens
D	2	Krišjānis Sārts	(Canada) Blackfalds Bulldogs	(Canada) BCHL	
D	4	Rolands Naglis	(Switzerland) SC Bern Future U21	(Switzerland) U21-Elit	
D	6	Mārtiņš Vītols	(Latvia) HK Zemgale	Latvia	
F	7	Rūdolfs Beržkalns	(United States) Muskegon Lumberjacks	(United States) USHL	Edmonton Oilers
F	8	Mārtiņš Klaucāns	(Canada) Sherbrooke Phoenix	(Canada) QMJHL	
D	10	Harijs Cjunskis	(Canada) Brooks Bandits	(Canada) BCHL	
F	11	Dmitrijs Diļevka	(Canada) Brooks Bandits	(Canada) BCHL	
F	12	Makisms Pumpins	(Czech Republic) HC Poruba U20	(Czech Republic) Extraliga juniorů	
F	14	Olivers Murnieks	(Canada) Saint John Sea Dogs	(Canada) QMJHL	Buffalo Sabres
D	15	Dārels Uļjanskis	(United States) Flint Firebirds	(Canada) OHL	Anaheim Ducks
F	16	Roberts Polis	(Latvia) HS Riga	Latvia	
F	17	Kristers Ansons	(Latvia) HK Mogo	Latvia	
F	18	Roberts Naudiņš	(United States) Shattuck–St. Mary's	(United States) Minnesota high school	
F	19	Bruno Osmanis	(Sweden) IF Björklöven	(Sweden) HockeyAllsvenskan	
F	20	Kristians Utnans	(United States) Kenai River Brown Bears	(United States) NAHL	
D	21	Krists Retenais	(Canada) Brooks Bandits	(Canada) BCHL	
F	22	Antons Macijevskis	(United States) Watertown Shamrocks	(United States) NAHL	
D	23	Alberts Smits	(Finland) Jukurit	(Finland) Liiga	New York Rangers
F	24	Daniels Serkins	(Switzerland) SC Bern	(Switzerland) Swiss League	
D	26	Oskars Briedis	(Sweden) Luleå HF	(Sweden) J20 Nationell	
F	27	Markuss Sieradzkis	(Czech Republic) HC Plzeň	(Czech Republic) Czech Extraliga	
F	28	Kārlis Fluģins	(Finland) KooKoo	(Finland) Liiga	
G	29	Ivans Kufterins	(Canada) Kamloops Blazers	(Canada) WHL	
G	30	Nils Mauriņš	(United States) Omaha Lancers	(United States) USHL	
