= 2026 Czech Hockey Games =

2026 Fortuna Hockey Games (Euro Hockey Games)
Tournament details
- Host countries: Czechia; Sweden
- Cities: České Budějovice; Jönköping
- Venues: 2 (in 2 host cities)
- Dates: 30 April – 3 May 2026
- Teams: 4

Final positions
- Champions: Sweden (6th title)
- Runners-up: Czech Republic
- Third place: Finland
- Fourth place: Switzerland

Tournament statistics
- Games played: 6
- Goals scored: 34 (5.67 per game)
- Attendance: 27,821 (4,637 per game)
- Scoring leader: (Sweden) Sascha Boumedienne (3 points)

The 2026 Fortuna Hockey Games was played between 30 April and 3 May 2026. The Czech Republic, Finland, Sweden and Switzerland will play a round-robin for a total of three games per team and six games in total. Five of the games were played in České Budějovice, Czech Republic and one game in Jönköping, Sweden. The tournament was won by Sweden The tournament was part of the 2025–26 Euro Hockey Tour.

== Standings ==
Pos	Team	Pld	W	OTW	OTL	L	GF	GA	GD	Pts
1	Sweden	3	3	0	0	0	15	5	+10	9
2	Czech Republic	3	1	0	1	1	5	7	−2	4
3	Finland	3	1	0	0	2	9	9	0	3
4	Switzerland	3	0	1	0	2	5	13	−8	2

Source: hokej.cz

== Games ==
All times are local. Prague – (Central European Summer Time – UTC+2) Jönköping – (Central European Summer Time – UTC+2)

30 April 2026; 18:00	Finland	2-3 (1–1, 0-1, 1–1)	Czech Republic	Budvar Arena, České Budějovice; Attendance: 5,033

Game reference

Harri Säteri
Goalies
Josef Kořenář
Referees:
(Czech Republic) Daniel Piechaczek
(Czech Republic) Miroslav Štolc
Linesmen:
(Czech Republic) David Thuma
(Czech Republic) Jaroslav Peluha

Mäenalanen (Puhakka, Björninen) - 14:48	1-0
	1-1	19:58 - Melovský (Galvas, Klapka) (PP)
	1-2	34:28 - Kubalík (Kantner)
Lammikko (Erholtz, Saarijärvi) - 45:54	2-2
	2-3	53:06 - Filip (Voženílek, Cibulka)

4 min
Penalties
6 min
30
Shots
22

30 April 2026; 18:00	Sweden	8-1 (1-0, 4-0, 3-1)	Switzerland	Husqvarna Garden, Jönköping; Attendance: 6,401

Game reference

Magnus Hellberg
Goalies
Leonardo Genoni Kevin Pasche
Referees:
(Finland) Riku Brander
(Finland) Janne Wuorenheimo
Linesmen:
(Sweden) Ludvig Lundgren
(Sweden) Rasmus Strömberg

Öhgren (Silfverberg, Brännström) - 13:39	1-0
Boumedienne (Persson, Henriksson) - 26:47	2-0
Berglund (Petersson, Boumedienne) - 30:09	3-0
Björck (Stenberg) - 35:17	4-0
Frondell (Berglund, Heed) - 38:32	5-0
Boumedienne (Henriksson, Öhgren) - 42:22	6-0
Andersson (Stenberg, Karlsson) - 52:23	7-0
	7-1	52:37 - Geisser (Rochette, Thürkauf)
Stenberg (Heed, Öhgren) (PP) - 56:04	8-1

4 min
Penalties
4 min
27
Shots
26

2 May 2026; 12:00	Switzerland	3-5 (0–2, 1-3, 2–0)	Finland	Budvar Arena, České Budějovice; Attendance: 3,995

Game reference

Stéphane Charlin Kevin Pasche
Goalies
Emil Larmi
Referees:
(Czech Republic) Jakub Mejzlík
(Czech Republic) Robin Šír
Linesmen:
(Czech Republic) Vít Lederer
(Czech Republic) Michal Axman

	0-1	17:11 – Puistola (Räty, Mäenalanen)
	0-2	17:59 – Räty (Manninen, Riikola)
	0-3	23:20 – Päivärinta (Ojantakanen)
	0-4	26:53 – Ojantakanen (Päkkilä, Päivärinta)
	0-5	32:47 – Kuokkanen (Heinola) (PP)
Jäger (Riat, Thürkauf) (PP) – 38:16	1-5
Moy (Rohrbach, Egli) – 40:49	2-5
Heldner (Malgin, Riat) – 41:57	3-5

6 min
Penalties
10 min
28
Shots
15

2 May 2026; 16:00	Czech Republic	2-4 (0–1, 1-0, 1–3)	Sweden	Budvar Arena, České Budějovice; Attendance: 5,694

Game reference

Jiří Patera
Goalies
Magnus Hellberg
Referees:
(Czech Republic) Daniel Piechaczek
(Czech Republic) Šimon Štolc
Linesmen:
(Czech Republic) David Zíka
(Czech Republic) Petr Šimánek

	0-1	05:20 – Stenberg (Persson, Larsson)
Chmelař (Melovský, Král) – 34:46	1-1
	1-2	48:39 – Hedqvist (Brännström, Niederbach)
	1-3	52:10 – Björck (Karlsson, Stenberg)
	1-4	53:30 – Brännström (Petersson, Persson)
Klapka (Melovský, Chmelař) – 59:34	2-4

8 min
Penalties
10 min
16
Shots
24

3 May 2026; 12:00	Sweden	3-2 (0–1, 3-0, 0–1)	Finland	Budvar Arena, České Budějovice; Attendance: 2,697

Game reference

Love Härenstam
Goalies
Harri Säteri
Referees:
(Czech Republic) Antonín Jeřábek
(Czech Republic) Daniel Pražák
Linesmen:
(Czech Republic) Michal Zíka
(Czech Republic) Petr Šimánek

	0-1	15:53 – Erholtz (Heinola, Merelä)
Öhgren (Henriksson) – 26:51	1-1
Petersson (Brännström, Karlsson) – 35:30	2-1
Henriksson (Persson, Sylvegård) – 36:11	3-1
	3-2	59:35 – Hirvonen (Honka, Saarijärvi) (PP/EA)

10 min
Penalties
6 min
18
Shots
32

3 May 2026; 16:00	Czech Republic	0-1 GWS (0–0, 0-0, 0–0) (OT: 0–0) (SO: 0–1)	Switzerland	Budvar Arena, České Budějovice; Attendance: 4,001

Game reference
Josef Kořenář	Goalies	Leonardo Genoni	Referees: (Sweden) Kristoffer Folkstrand (Sweden) Alexander Österberg; Linesmen: (Czech Republic) Jiří Ondráček (Czech Republic) Lukáš Rampír
	Shootout	Rochette	Referees: (Sweden) Kristoffer Folkstrand (Sweden) Alexander Österberg; Linesmen: (Czech Republic) Jiří Ondráček (Czech Republic) Lukáš Rampír
6 min	Penalties	8 min	Referees: (Sweden) Kristoffer Folkstrand (Sweden) Alexander Österberg; Linesmen: (Czech Republic) Jiří Ondráček (Czech Republic) Lukáš Rampír
22	Shots	30	Referees: (Sweden) Kristoffer Folkstrand (Sweden) Alexander Österberg; Linesmen: (Czech Republic) Jiří Ondráček (Czech Republic) Lukáš Rampír

== Scoring leaders ==
Pos	Player	Country	GP	G	A	Pts	+/−	PIM	POS
1	Ivar Stenberg	Sweden	3	2	3	5	+3	2	F
2	Liam Öhgren	Sweden	3	2	2	4	+2	0	F
3	Karl Henriksson	Sweden	3	1	3	4	+2	2	F
4	Erik Brännström	Sweden	3	1	3	4	+5	2	D
5	Joel Persson	Sweden	3	0	4	4	+6	0	D

GP = Games played; G = Goals; A = Assists; Pts = Points; +/− = Plus/minus; PIM = Penalties in minutes; POS = Position
Source: hokej.cz

== Goaltending leaders ==
Pos	Player	Country	TOI	GA	GAA	Sv%	SO
1	Josef Kořenář	Czech Republic	125:00	2	1.00	96.61	1
2	Love Harenstam	Sweden	60:00	2	2.00	93.75	0
3	Magnus Hellberg	Sweden	120:00	3	1.50	92.86	0
4	Emil Larmi	Finland	60:00	3	3.00	89.29	0

TOI = Time on ice (minutes:seconds); SA = Shots against; GA = Goals against; GAA = Goals Against Average; Sv% = Save percentage; SO = Shutouts
Source: hokej.cz
