= Viggo Björck =

Swedish ice hockey player (born 2008)

- Born: 12 March 2008 (age 18) Stockholm, Sweden
- Height: 5 ft 9 in (175 cm)
- Weight: 177 lb (80 kg; 12 st 9 lb)
- Position: Forward
- Shoots: Right
- NHL team Former teams: Winnipeg Jets; Djurgårdens IF
- National team: Sweden
- NHL draft: 8th overall, 2026; Winnipeg Jets
- Playing career: 2025–present

Viggo Björck (born 12 March 2008) is a Swedish professional ice hockey player who is a forward for the Winnipeg Jets of the National Hockey League (NHL). He was drafted eighth overall by the Winnipeg Jets in the 2026 NHL entry draft.

== Playing career ==
Björck began playing hockey in local club Täby HC.

He joined the junior organisation of Djurgårdens IF for the 2024–25 season, and split time between the J20 team and the J18 team. Björck played 42 games in the J20 Nationell scoring 27 goals and 74 points, setting a new record for the league at only 16 years of age. His team went on to win the Swedish junior championship in April 2025. He also made his debut in the men's team in the Swedish second tier league HockeyAllsvenskan the same season and scored a goal on a pass from Patrick Thoresen on 14 February 2025 in a home game against Västerås IK.

Djurgårdens IF were promoted to the Swedish Hockey League (SHL) for the 2025–26 season and Björck scored his first SHL goal on 25 September 2025 in an away game against Luleå HF, beating goaltender Matteus Ward. During the autumn of 2025, Björck played in a junior line with Victor Eklund and Anton Frondell. In total, he recorded 6 goals and 15 points in 42 SHL regular season games, adding 1 goal and 3 points in 3 playoff games.

After Djurgårdens IF was eliminated from the SHL playoffs, Björck rejoined the club's J20 team to play in the final rounds of the Swedish junior championship. The finals were scheduled to coincide with the start of the 2026 World U18 Championships, and the Swedish Ice Hockey Association selected Björck for the national team and required his participation. Björck chose to remain with Djurgårdens IF for the junior championship finals and was subsequently barred from participating in the U18 World Championship. He later won his second consecutive Swedish junior championship title with Djurgårdens IF in April 2026.

On 11 July, Djurgårdens IF announced that Björck had chosen to sign with the Winnipeg Jets, who later signed him to a three-year, entry-level contract.

=== Winnipeg Jets ===
Björck played in his first NHL game on 1 October 2026 against the Boston Bruins. After going pointless for sixteen games, he scored his first NHL point when he assisted on a goal by Mark Scheifele during a 5 November game against the Vancouver Canucks. Later, on November 17th, 2026- Björck scored his first career NHL goal, the only Jets goal, in a 2-1 Jets loss to the visiting Ottawa Senators.

== International play ==
Medal record

Men's ice hockey

Representing Sweden

World Junior Championships
Gold medal – first place	2026 United States	

In December 2025, Björck was selected to represent the Sweden junior team at the 2026 World Junior Championships. He recorded three goals and six assists in seven games and won a gold medal. This was Sweden's first gold medal at the World Junior Championship since 2012.

In April 2026, Björck was selected for the Sweden senior team for the 2026 Czech Hockey Games. The following month, he was selected for the 2026 World Championship. Björck became the youngest Swedish player in World Championship history when he debuted against Canada on 15 May at the age of 18 years and 65 days, thus breaking the 2023 record held by Leo Carlsson, who was 18 years and 136 days old. Two days later, he scored a goal in the 6–2 win against Denmark, and became the youngest goalscorer for the Swedish national team in the World Championship.

== Personal life ==
Björck is the son of former professional ice hockey player Jesper Björck. He is the younger brother of Wilson Björck, who was drafted in the fifth round of the 2025 NHL entry draft by the Vancouver Canucks.

His aunt is Swedish singer and television host Charlotte Perrelli. He picked Perrelli's song "Hero" as his official goal song for the 2026–27 season.

== Career statistics ==
=== Regular season and playoffs ===
			Regular season					Playoffs
Season	Team	League	GP	G	A	Pts	PIM	GP	G	A	Pts	PIM
2024–25	Djurgårdens IF	J18	4	1	5	6	0	8	4	15	19	6
2024–25	Djurgårdens IF	J20	42	27	47	74	41	9	4	11	15	2
2024–25	Djurgårdens IF	Allsv	1	1	0	1	2	—	—	—	—	—
2025–26	Djurgårdens IF	J20	4	1	4	5	25	9	8	12	20	2
2025–26	Djurgårdens IF	SHL	42	6	9	15	12	3	1	2	3	0
SHL totals			42	6	9	15	12	3	1	2	3	0

=== International ===
Year	Team	Event	Result	GP	G	A	Pts	PIM
2024	Sweden	U17	3rd place, bronze medalist(s)	4	0	5	5	0
2025	Sweden	U18	2nd place, silver medalist(s)	7	4	4	8	6
2026	Sweden	WJC	1st place, gold medalist(s)	7	3	6	9	2
2026	Sweden	WC	7th	8	1	5	6	2
Junior totals				18	7	15	22	8
Senior totals				8	1	5	6	2

Awards and achievements
Preceded by Sascha Boumedienne	Winnipeg Jets first-round draft pick 2026	Succeeded by
