= Pateras =

Pateras is a surname. Notable people with the surname include:

- Anthony Pateras (born 1979), Australian-born composer, pianist, and electronic musician
- Nikos Pateras (born 1963), Greek shipowner
- Raúl Pateras Pescara (1890–1966), Argentine engineer, lawyer, and inventor

== See also ==
- Patera (disambiguation), disambiguation page with surname
