= Patera (disambiguation) =

A patera was a saucer-shaped Roman drinking vessel. In modern usage, it describes something similar to a shallow bowl or deep dish and may refer to:

== Architecture ==
- Patera (architecture), an ornamental element.

== Astronomy ==
- Patera (planetary nomenclature), an irregular crater, or a complex crater with scalloped edges on a celestial body.

== People ==
- Patera Silk, fictional character in The Book of the Long Sun by Gene Wolfe
- Adolf Patera (1819-1894), Bohemian chemist, mineralogist and metallurgist
- Dennis Patera (b. 1945), American football player
- Francesco Patera (born 1993), Belgian professional boxer
- Jack Patera (1933–2018), former American football player and coach in the National Football League
- Jiří Patera, multiple people
- Ken Patera (b. 1942), retired professional wrestler, Olympic weightlifter, and Strongman competitor from Portland, Oregon
- Pavel Patera (b. 1971), professional ice hockey player from the Czech Republic
- Anthony Pateras (b. 1979), multidisciplinary musician in Melbourne, Australia
- Raúl Pateras Pescara de Castelluccio (1890-1966), marquis of Pateras-Pescara and an Argentine lawyer and inventor

== Zoology ==
- Patera (gastropod), an American genus of snails

== Other Uses ==
- A small decorative plate fixed to the base of a clock.
