= Loke Krantz =

Swedish ice hockey player (born 2007)

- Born: 12 May 2007 (age 19) Enköping, Sweden
- Height: 6 ft 1 in (185 cm)
- Weight: 194 lb (88 kg; 13 st 12 lb)
- Position: Right wing
- Shoots: Right
- SHL team: Linköping HC
- NHL draft: 218th overall, 2025; Seattle Kraken
- Playing career: 2025–present

Loke Krantz (born 12 May 2007) is a Swedish professional ice hockey right winger for Linköping HC of the Swedish Hockey League. Krantz was selected by the Seattle Kraken in the seventh round, 218th overall, of the 2025 NHL entry draft.

== International play ==
Medal record

Representing Sweden

Ice hockey

World Junior Championships
Gold medal – first place	2026 United States	

In December 2025, he was selected to represent Sweden at the 2026 World Junior Ice Hockey Championships. Krantz went scoreless in six games and won a gold medal. This was Sweden's first gold medal at the IIHF World Junior Championship since 2012.

== Career statistics ==
=== Regular season and playoffs ===
			Regular season					Playoffs
Season	Team	League	GP	G	A	Pts	PIM	GP	G	A	Pts	PIM
2022–23	Enköpings SK	Div.1	1	0	0	0	0	—	—	—	—	—
2023–24	Linköping HC	J20	4	1	0	1	0	—	—	—	—	—
2024–25	Linköping HC	J20	44	12	5	17	41	3	1	0	1	0
2025–26	Linköping HC	J20	18	12	8	20	18	4	0	1	1	0
2025–26	Linköping HC	SHL	30	1	1	2	16	—	—	—	—	—
SHL totals			30	1	1	2	16	—	—	—	—	—

=== International ===
Year	Team	Event	Result	GP	G	A	Pts	PIM
2026	Sweden	WJC	1st place, gold medalist(s)	6	0	0	0	2
Junior totals				6	0	0	0	2
