= Linus Eriksson =

Swedish ice hockey player (born 2006)

- Born: 23 March 2006 (age 20) Stockholm, Sweden
- Height: 6 ft 0 in (183 cm)
- Weight: 183 lb (83 kg; 13 st 1 lb)
- Position: Centre
- Shoots: Left
- SHL team: Timrå IK
- NHL draft: 58th overall, 2024; Florida Panthers
- Playing career: 2024–present

Linus Eriksson (born 23 March 2006) is a Swedish professional ice hockey centre for Timrå IK of the Swedish Hockey League (SHL). Eriksson was drafted 58th overall by the Florida Panthers in the 2024 NHL entry draft.

== International play ==
Medal record

Representing Sweden

Ice hockey

World Junior Championships
Gold medal – first place	2026 United States	

World U18 Championships
Silver medal – second place	2024 Finland	

In December 2025, he was selected to represent Sweden at the 2026 World Junior Ice Hockey Championships. Eriksson recorded one goal and one assist in seven games and won a gold medal. This was Sweden's first gold medal at the IIHF World Junior Championship since 2012.
