= Vojtěch Čihař =

Czech ice hockey player (born 2007)

- Born: 29 March 2007 (age 19) Chomutov, Czech Republic
- Height: 6 ft 1 in (185 cm)
- Weight: 181 lb (82 kg; 12 st 13 lb)
- Position: Left wing
- Shoots: Left
- NHL team (P) Cur. team Former teams: Los Angeles Kings; Kelowna Rockets (WHL); HC Energie Karlovy Vary
- NHL draft: 59th overall, 2025; Los Angeles Kings
- Playing career: 2023–present

Vojtěch Čihař (born 29 March 2007) is a Czech professional ice hockey forward for the Kelowna Rockets in the Western Hockey League (WHL) while under contract as a prospect to the Los Angeles Kings of the National Hockey League (NHL). Čihař was drafted in the second round, 59th overall, by the Kings in the 2025 NHL entry draft.

== Playing career ==
Čihař played as a youth within HC Energie Karlovy Vary before making his professional debut in the Czech Extraliga (ELH) during the 2023–24 season.

After three seasons in the ELH with Karlovy Vary, Čihař moved in the midst of the 2025–26 season, to continue his development in North America in junior major junior hockey team, the Kelowna Rockets of the WHL. On 10 December 2025, Čihař was signed to a three-year entry-level contract with draft club, the Los Angeles Kings, through the 2027–28 NHL season.

== International play ==
Medal record

Representing Czech Republic

Ice hockey

World Junior Championships
Silver medal – second place	2026 United States	
Bronze medal – third place	2025 Canada	

Čihař won a bronze medal with Czechia in the 2025 World Junior Ice Hockey Championships. He again represented Czechia at the 2026 World Junior Ice Hockey Championships where he led the team in scoring with four goals and eight assist in seven games and won a silver medal. He was subsequently named tournament MVP.

== Career statistics ==
=== Regular season and playoffs ===
			Regular season					Playoffs
Season	Team	League	GP	G	A	Pts	PIM	GP	G	A	Pts	PIM
2023–24	HC Energie Karlovy Vary	Czech.20	35	14	12	26	20	7	2	1	3	8
2023–24	HC Energie Karlovy Vary	ELH	6	0	0	0	0	—	—	—	—	—
2024–25	HC Energie Karlovy Vary	ELH	43	4	5	9	8	8	0	1	1	0
2025–26	HC Energie Karlovy Vary	ELH	27	4	4	8	8	—	—	—	—	—
2025–26	Kelowna Rockets	WHL	31	12	19	31	14	9	6	7	13	6
ELH totals			76	8	9	17	16	8	0	1	1	0

=== International ===
Year	Team	Event	Result	GP	G	A	Pts	PIM
2023	Czechia	U17	4th	8	2	2	4	0
2024	Czechia	HG18	2nd place, silver medalist(s)	5	1	1	2	4
2025	Czechia	WJC	3rd place, bronze medalist(s)	7	1	1	2	29
2025	Czechia	U18	7th	5	1	2	3	2
2026	Czechia	WJC	2nd place, silver medalist(s)	7	4	8	12	2
Junior totals				32	9	14	23	37
