= Adam Novotný =

Czech ice hockey player (born 2007)

- Born: 13 November 2007 (age 18) Hradec Králové, Czech Republic
- Height: 6 ft 1 in (185 cm)
- Weight: 205 lb (93 kg; 14 st 9 lb)
- Position: Left wing
- Shoots: Left
- OHL team Former teams: Peterborough Petes; Mountfield HK
- NHL draft: 24th overall, 2026; Vancouver Canucks

Adam Novotný (born 13 November 2007) is a Czech professional ice hockey forward for the Peterborough Petes of the OHL. He previously played for Mountfield HK in the Czech Extraliga. He was drafted 24th overall by the Vancouver Canucks in the 2026 NHL entry draft.

== Playing career ==
Novotný had 59 points in 48 games in the top Czech junior league.

Novotný was selected by the Peterborough Petes in the 2024 CHL Import Draft.

In the 2026 NHL entry draft, Novotný was drafted by the Vancouver Canucks 24th overall.

== International play ==
Medal record

Representing Czech Republic

Ice hockey

World Junior Championships
Silver medal – second place	2026 United States	
Bronze medal – third place	2025 Canada	

Novotný recorded five points at the 2024 Hlinka Gretzky Cup.

Novotný represented Czechia at the 2025 World Junior Ice Hockey Championships and recorded one goal in seven games and won a bronze medal. He again represented Czechia at the 2026 World Junior Ice Hockey Championships and recorded three assists in seven games and won a silver medal.

Awards and achievements
Preceded by Caleb Malhotra	Vancouver Canucks first-round draft pick 2026	Succeeded by Incumbent
