= Anton Frondell =

Swedish ice hockey player (born 2007)

- Born: 7 May 2007 (age 19) Trångsund, Sweden
- Height: 6 ft 1 in (185 cm)
- Weight: 198 lb (90 kg; 14 st 2 lb)
- Position: Forward
- Shoots: Left
- NHL team Former teams: Chicago Blackhawks; Djurgårdens IF
- National team: Sweden
- NHL draft: 3rd overall, 2025; Chicago Blackhawks
- Playing career: 2023–present

Anton Frondell (born 7 May 2007) is a Swedish professional ice hockey player who is a forward for the Chicago Blackhawks of the National Hockey League (NHL). He was selected third overall by the Blackhawks in the 2025 NHL entry draft. Frondell developed through the junior ranks of Djurgårdens IF and made his senior debut during the 2023–24 HockeyAllsvenskan season. He later contributed to the club's promotion to the Swedish Hockey League in 2025 and became the second‑youngest player in league history to record a hat trick during the 2025–26 SHL season.

== Playing career ==
Frondell began playing ice hockey with FoC Farsta, a local Stockholm-based club. He joined the junior organisation of Djurgårdens IF for the 2021–22 season, and split time between the U16 team and the J18 team. He was promoted to the J20 team of Djurgården the following season and also participated in the 2022 TV-pucken, a Swedish national under‑16 ice hockey tournament for district teams, representing Stockholm South and finishing in second place. Frondell made his senior-level debut at 16 years old for Djurgårdens IF in the second-tier HockeyAllsvenskan during the 2023–24 season, recording just under four minutes of time on ice in a 7–3 victory over Södertälje SK on 29 December 2023. Although he played primarily at the under-20 level that year, he appeared in nine HockeyAllsvenskan games and recorded one assist. He suffered a foot injury in February 2024, which caused him to miss the remainder of the 2023–24 season.

A knee injury hindered him in the beginning of the 2024–25 season, which made him miss the first few games. He scored his first HockeyAllsvenskan goal against Kalmar HC on 13 November 2024. Frondell scored two goals in a four-point game in the 5–2 victory against IF Björklöven on 27 January 2025. Less than a month later, on 19 February, he repeated the feat with another two goals and four points in an away win against Almtuna IS. Throughout the 2024–25 regular season, Frondell was typically paired with Victor Eklund and Fredric Weigel. On 14 March, Frondell signed a one-year contract extension with Djurgårdens IF, committing to the club for the 2025–26 season regardless of its promotion status from HockeyAllsvenskan to the Swedish Hockey League (SHL). Two days later, he scored the game-winning goal in the first promotion playoff quarterfinal against Mora IK, making the score 4–3 for his team. He recorded 11 goals and 25 points in 29 regular season games, marking the second-highest point total ever by a player under 18 in HockeyAllsvenskan, only surpassed by the 27 points scored by William Nylander in 35 games during the 2013–14 season. In the playoffs, Frondell played in 16 games, recording three goals and four assists as Djurgårdens IF earned promotion to the SHL.

On 27 June 2025, Frondell was selected third overall by the Chicago Blackhawks in the 2025 NHL entry draft. He signed a three-year, entry-level contract with the Blackhawks on 15 July. Frondell returned to Djurgårdens IF on loan for the 2025–26 SHL season. Frondell scored his first SHL goal on 27 September 2025 in a home game against Timrå IK, beating goaltender Jacob Johansson. On 4 October 2025, Frondell scored a hat trick against Malmö Redhawks and, at 18 years and 150 days of age, became the second‑youngest player in the history of the SHL to do so. He recorded 20 goals and 28 points during the 2025–26 regular season, a total that ranks fourth all-time for goals by an SHL player aged 18 or younger. He trails only Tomas Sandström (23 goals), Markus Näslund (22), and Daniel Sedin (21) for the most goals scored by a player of that age. Frondell scored his 20th goal in the last game of the regular season against Skellefteå AIK. Frondell scored the overtime winner against Malmö Redhawks at Hovet on 17 March 2026, securing the first game of the eighth-finals before Djurgården ultimately was eliminated by Malmö, 1–2 in games.

In his NHL debut on 24 March 2026, Frondell recorded his first NHL point, which was an assist on Ilya Mikheyev's goal, while the Blackhawks won 4–3 against the New York Islanders. He scored his first NHL goal on 31 March, during a 4–3 overtime loss to the Winnipeg Jets.

== International play ==
Medal record

Men's ice hockey

Representing Sweden

World Junior Championships
Gold medal – first place	2026 United States	

Frondell captained Sweden to a bronze medal at the 2023 World U-17 Hockey Challenge, where he had six goals and an assist in seven games.

Frondell competed in the 2024 under-18 Five Nations Tournament as a 16-year-old, leading Sweden in goals and beating the United States for first place in the event.

In December 2025, he was selected to represent Sweden at the 2026 World Junior Championships. He recorded five goals and three assists in seven games and won a gold medal. This was Sweden's first gold medal at the World Junior Championships since 2012.

In April 2026, Frondell was selected for the Swedish national team for the 2026 Czech Hockey Games. The following month, Frondell was selected for the Swedish national team for the 2026 IIHF World Championship.

== Career statistics ==
=== Regular season and playoffs ===
			Regular season					Playoffs
Season	Team	League	GP	G	A	Pts	PIM	GP	G	A	Pts	PIM
2021–22	Djurgårdens IF	J18	1	1	3	4	0	—	—	—	—	—
2022–23	Djurgårdens IF	J18	20	14	18	32	4	—	—	—	—	—
2023–24	Djurgårdens IF	J18	4	5	5	10	6	—	—	—	—	—
2023–24	Djurgårdens IF	J20	29	18	21	39	16	—	—	—	—	—
2023–24	Djurgårdens IF	Allsv	9	0	1	1	0	—	—	—	—	—
2024–25	Djurgårdens IF	J20	10	5	2	7	6	—	—	—	—	—
2024–25	Djurgårdens IF	Allsv	29	11	14	25	16	16	3	4	7	4
2025–26	Djurgårdens IF	SHL	43	20	8	28	16	3	1	1	2	0
2025–26	Chicago Blackhawks	NHL	12	3	6	9	4	—	—	—	—	—
SHL totals			43	20	8	28	16	3	1	1	2	0
NHL totals			12	3	6	9	4	—	—	—	—	—

=== International ===
Year	Team	Event	Result	GP	G	A	Pts	PIM
2023	Sweden	U17	3rd place, bronze medalist(s)	7	6	1	7	4
2025	Sweden	U18	2nd place, silver medalist(s)	5	1	2	3	0
2026	Sweden	WJC	1st place, gold medalist(s)	7	5	3	8	0
2026	Sweden	WC	7th	4	1	2	3	0
Junior totals				19	12	6	18	4
Senior totals				4	1	2	3	0

Awards and achievements
Preceded by Marek Vanacker	Chicago Blawkhawks first-round draft pick 2025	Succeeded by Václav Nestrašil
