= Eddie Genborg =

Swedish ice hockey player (born 2007)

- Born: 20 April 2007 (age 19) Trollhättan, Sweden
- Height: 6 ft 1 in (185 cm)
- Weight: 179 lb (81 kg; 12 st 11 lb)
- Position: Right wing
- Shoots: Left
- SHL team Former teams: Timrå IK; Linköping HC
- NHL draft: 44th overall, 2025; Detroit Red Wings
- Playing career: 2024–present

Eddie Genborg (born 20 April 2007) is a Swedish professional ice hockey right winger for Timrå IK of the Swedish Hockey League (SHL). He was drafted 44th overall by the Detroit Red Wings in the 2025 NHL entry draft.

== Playing career ==
Genborg is a product of the Linköping HC program. During the 2023–24 season, he recorded one goal and one assist in one game at the J18 Elit level, and four goals and one assist in 25 games at the J20 Nationell level. During the 2024–25 season, he recorded 19 goals and 15 assists in 28 games with Linköping's junior team, and two goals and 28 games in the SHL. On 12 April 2025, Genborg left Linköping at the conclusion of his contract and was signed to a two-year deal with fellow SHL club, Timrå IK.

He was drafted in the second round, 44th overall, by the Detroit Red Wings in the 2025 NHL entry draft.

== International play ==
Medal record

Representing Sweden

Ice hockey

World Junior Championships
Gold medal – first place	2026 United States	

World U18 Championships
Silver medal – second place	2025 United States	

Genborg represented Sweden at the 2025 IIHF World U18 Championships, where he recorded three assists in seven games, and won a silver medal.

In December 2025, he was selected to represent Sweden at the 2026 World Junior Ice Hockey Championships. He recorded three goals and five assists in seven games and won a gold medal. This was Sweden's first gold medal at the IIHF World Junior Championship since 2012.

== Career statistics ==
=== Regular season and playoffs ===
			Regular season					Playoffs
Season	Team	League	GP	G	A	Pts	PIM	GP	G	A	Pts	PIM
2023–24	Linköping HC	J18	1	1	1	2	0	3	0	0	0	2
2023–24	Linköping HC	J20	25	4	1	5	41	3	0	0	0	2
2024–25	Linköping HC	J20	28	19	15	34	26	3	1	2	3	4
2024–25	Linköping HC	SHL	28	2	0	2	4	—	—	—	—	—
2025–26	Timrå IK	SHL	43	9	16	25	24	—	—	—	—	—
SHL totals			71	11	16	27	28	—	—	—	—	—

=== International ===
Year	Team	Event	Result	GP	G	A	Pts	PIM
2025	Sweden	U18	2nd place, silver medalist(s)	7	0	3	3	10
2026	Sweden	WJC	1st place, gold medalist(s)	7	3	5	8	0
Junior totals				14	3	8	11	10
