= Aatos Koivu =

Finnish ice hockey player (born 2006)

- Born: 22 June 2006 (age 20) Turku, Finland
- Height: 185 cm (6 ft 1 in)
- Weight: 77 kg (170 lb; 12 st 2 lb)
- Position: Forward
- Shoots: Right
- Liiga team: HC TPS
- NHL draft: 70th overall, 2024; Montreal Canadiens
- Playing career: 2024–present

Aatos Sisu Sakari Koivu (born 22 June 2006) is a Finnish professional ice hockey player who is a forward for TPS of the Liiga. He was selected in the third round, 70th overall, by the Montreal Canadiens of the National Hockey League (NHL) in the 2024 NHL entry draft.

The son of former NHL star Saku Koivu, and nephew of former Minnesota Wild Captain Mikko Koivu, Koivu is a product of the TPS youth system in Finland. A versatile two-way forward with strong offensive instincts, Koivu rose through the ranks of the TPS U18 and U20 programs, leading the U20 team in goals during the 2023–24 season of the U20 SM-sarja. He made his professional debut in the Liiga on 3 January 2024, and scored his first professional goal against Ässät in September 2024.

Following in his father's footsteps, Koivu was selected by the Montreal Canadiens in the third round, 70th overall in the 2024 NHL draft. This made the Koivus only the second father-son duo in Canadiens history to both be drafted by the franchise. Internationally, he has represented Finland at the U18 World Championships and is noted for a playing style he compares to Sebastian Aho. According to TPS U20 head coach Fredrik Norrena, his player profile resembles that of Alexander Ovechkin.

== Playing career ==
Koivu began the 2023–24 season with the TPS U18 team, but moved up to the U20 team as the season progressed, where he played the majority of the season. Koivu recorded 16 goals and 15 assists for 31 points in 28 regular season games, making Koivu the leading goal scorer and third-highest point scorer for TPS. In the playoffs, Koivu recorded two goals and five assists for seven points in 10 games. Koivu made his Liiga debut on 3 January 2024, in an away game against Mikkelin Jukurit. Koivu earned a spot in the TPS lineup following several team injuries. Koivu was designated as the third-line center, playing with U20 forwards Kasper Pikkarainen and Jan Shikera. Koivu recorded 13:37 of ice time with a −2 rating and won 52.9% of 17 faceoffs.

The Montreal Canadiens drafted Koivu in the third round as the 70th overall pick in the 2024 NHL entry draft. Koivu's father Saku was also drafted by the Canadiens in the summer of 1993. They became the second father-son pair in franchise history to be drafted by the club, after the Canadiens selected Réjean Houle first overall in 1969 and his son Jean-François 99th overall in 1993.

Koivu scored his first career Liiga goal during the ninth round of the 2024–25 season on 28 September 2024, against Ässät. During the rookie season, Koivu played 32 regular season games with one goal and seven assists for eight points and two playoff games without points. Koivu also played part of the season with the TPS U20 team. Koivu tied for the team lead in playoff goals with five.

== International play ==
Koivu played in the 2024 World U18 Championships. In total, he has played seven junior (under-20) and 19 youth (unber-17 and under-18) international matches. Koivu played in the 2026 World Junior Championships, but was a healthy scratch in later playoff games.
