= William Håkansson =

Swedish ice hockey player (born 2007)

- Born: 8 October 2007 (age 18) Solna, Sweden
- Height: 6 ft 4 in (193 cm)
- Weight: 207 lb (94 kg; 14 st 11 lb)
- Position: Defence
- Shoots: Left
- SHL team: Luleå HF
- NHL draft: 51st overall, 2026; Carolina Hurricanes
- Playing career: 2024–present

William Håkansson (born 8 October 2007) is a Swedish professional ice hockey defenceman for Luleå HF of the Swedish Hockey League (SHL).

== Playing career ==
Håkansson made his SHL debut for Luleå during the 2024–25 season. He began the 2025–26 season with Luleå where he recorded two assists in 22 games. On 14 January 2026, he was loaned to Almtuna IS of the HockeyAllsvenskan. He recorded two goals and two assists in 16 games for Almtuna.

On 24 April 2025, he signed a three-year contract extension with Luleå.

== International play ==
Medal record

Ice hockey

Representing Sweden

World Junior Championships
Gold medal – first place	2026 United States	

In December 2025, Håkansson was selected to represent Sweden at the 2026 World Junior Ice Hockey Championships. During the tournament he recorded two assists in seven games and won a gold medal.

== Career statistics ==
=== Regular season and playoffs ===
			Regular season					Playoffs
Season	Team	League	GP	G	A	Pts	PIM	GP	G	A	Pts	PIM
2023–24	Luleå HF	J20	26	0	5	5	14	—	—	—	—	—
2024–25	Luleå HF	J20	42	7	15	22	82	3	0	0	0	2
2024–25	Luleå HF	SHL	3	0	0	0	0	1	0	0	0	0
2025–26	Luleå HF	J20	6	0	4	4	36	5	1	3	4	6
2025–26	Almtuna IS	Allsv	16	2	2	4	39	2	0	2	2	4
2025–26	Luleå HF	SHL	22	0	2	2	8	9	0	0	0	0
SHL totals			25	0	2	2	8	10	0	0	0	0

=== International ===
Year	Team	Event	Result	GP	G	A	Pts	PIM
2026	Sweden	WJC	1st place, gold medalist(s)	7	0	2	2	4
Junior totals				7	0	2	2	4
