= Lasse Boelius =

- Born: 16 March 2007 (age 19) Pori, Finland
- Height: 185 cm (6 ft 1 in)
- Weight: 82 kg (181 lb; 12 st 13 lb)
- Position: Defence
- Shoots: Left
- Liiga team: HC Ässät Pori
- NHL draft: 60th overall, 2025; Anaheim Ducks
- Playing career: 2024–present

Lasse Boelius (born 16 March 2007) is a Finnish ice hockey defenceman for HC Ässät Pori of the Liiga. He was drafted in the second round, 60th overall, by the Anaheim Ducks in the 2025 NHL entry draft.

== Playing career ==
Boelius started playing ice hockey at the age of four with HC Ässät Pori. He played as a forward until the age of 12, when he switched to defence at the suggestion of his coach. With Ässät, he won the Finnish U20 championship in the 2023–24 season.

In April 2024, Boelius signed a three-year Liiga contract to Ässät's senior club. He began the 2024–25 season with their U20 team before making his professional debut on 28 September 2024 against HC TPS as Ässät's seventh defenseman. He earned his first career Liiga point, an assist, against SaiPa on 12 October.

Entering the 2025 NHL entry draft, Boelius is projected to be one of the top Finnish draft picks. He was ranked tenth among European skaters in NHL Central Scouting's January ranking.

== Career statistics ==
=== Regular season and playoffs ===
			Regular season					Playoffs
Season	Team	League	GP	G	A	Pts	PIM	GP	G	A	Pts	PIM
2023–24	Porin Ässät	U20	35	1	13	14	0	15	2	5	7	4
2024–25	Porin Ässät	U20	34	4	14	18	16	2	0	1	1	2
2024–25	Porin Ässät	Liiga	7	0	2	2	2	—	—	—	—	—
2025–26	Porin Ässät	Liiga	40	1	7	8	8	—	—	—	—	—
Liiga totals			47	1	9	10	10	—	—	—	—	—

=== International ===
Year	Team	Event	Result	GP	G	A	Pts	PIM
2023	Finland	U17	6th	7	0	2	2	4
2025	Finland	U18	5th	5	1	5	6	4
2026	Finland	WJC	4th	7	2	5	7	4
Junior totals				19	3	12	15	12
