= Adam Jiříček =

Czech ice hockey player (born 2006)

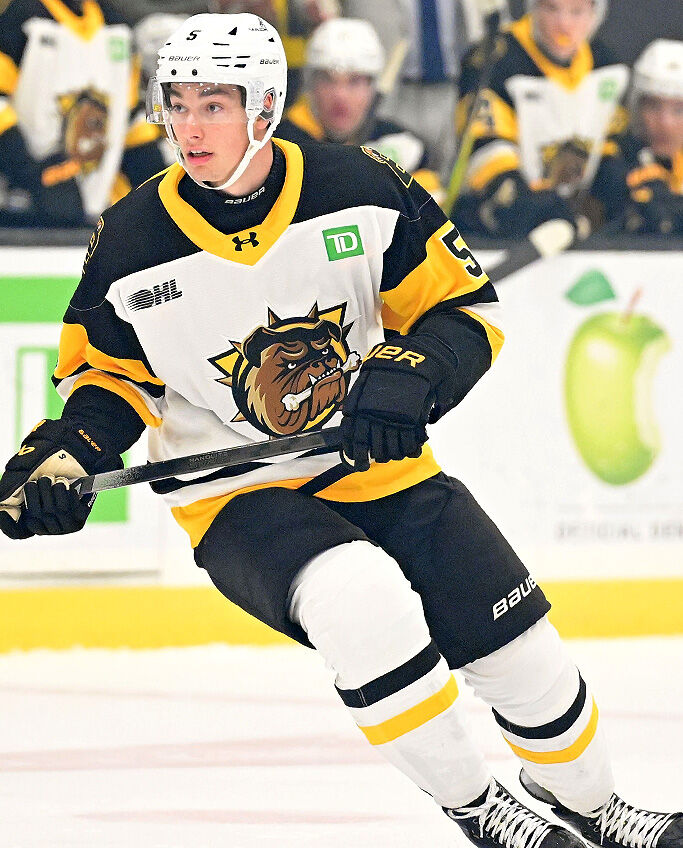
- Born: 28 June 2006 (age 20) Plzeň, Czech Republic
- Height: 6 ft 2 in (188 cm)
- Weight: 176 lb (80 kg; 12 st 8 lb)
- Position: Defence
- Shoots: Right
- NHL team Former teams: St. Louis Blues; Škoda Plzeň
- NHL draft: 16th overall, 2024; St. Louis Blues
- Playing career: 2022–present

Adam Jiříček (born 28 June 2006) is a Czech professional ice hockey defenceman for the St. Louis Blues of the National Hockey League (NHL). He was drafted 16th overall by the St. Louis Blues in the 2024 NHL entry draft.

== Playing career ==
Jiříček split the 2022–23 season between the under-20 and Czech Extraliga (ELH) levels for Škoda Plzeň, recording 12 goals and 29 points in 41 under-20 games, and two assists in 12 Extraliga games. He was assigned to the under-17 team for the playoffs, recording a goal and 13 points in 8 playoff games. After the year, he was drafted 19th overall in the 2023 Canadian Hockey League Import Draft by the Brantford Bulldogs of the Ontario Hockey League (OHL), but elected to remain in Europe.

In December of his draft year, the 2023–24 season, Jiříček suffered a season-ending knee injury during an international competition. In 19 Extraliga games, he recorded one assist. His lackluster point production in the Extraliga and uncertainty related to his injury tempered expectations for Jiříček, and the consensus entering the draft was that he would be picked in the late first round. During the 2024 NHL entry draft, Jiříček was selected 16th overall by the St. Louis Blues. He signed a three-year, entry-level contract with the club on 2 July.

On 29 October 2024, Jiříček was assigned to the Bulldogs for the remainder of the 2024–25 OHL season. He reunited with fellow defenceman Tomáš Hamara, who Jiříček played with during the 2024 World Junior Championships.

== International play ==
Medal record

Representing Czech Republic

Ice hockey

World Junior Championships
Silver medal – second place	2026 United States	
Bronze medal – third place	2024 Sweden	
Bronze medal – third place	2025 Canada	

Hlinka Gretzky Cup
Silver medal – second place	2023 Czechia/Slovakia	

As an alternate captain representing the Czech Republic under-18 at the 2022 World U-17 Hockey Challenge, Jiříček recorded a goal and an assist in six games.

Jiříček won a silver medal at the 2023 Hlinka Gretzky Cup.

Jiříček was a member of the bronze medal-winning Czech Republic junior team at the 2024 World Junior Championships. He suffered a knee injury in the opening match against Slovakia junior team, for which he underwent surgery and was replaced by Adam Židlický.

== Personal life ==
Jiříček is the younger brother of Philadelphia Flyers defenceman David Jiříček.

== Career statistics ==
=== Regular season and playoffs ===
			Regular season					Playoffs
Season	Team	League	GP	G	A	Pts	PIM	GP	G	A	Pts	PIM
2021–22	Škoda Plzeň	Czech U20	1	1	0	1	0	—	—	—	—	—
2022–23	Škoda Plzeň	Czech U20	41	12	17	29	24	1	0	0	0	0
2022–23	Škoda Plzeň	ELH	12	0	2	2	6	—	—	—	—	—
2023–24	Škoda Plzeň	Czech U20	3	0	0	0	0	—	—	—	—	—
2023–24	Škoda Plzeň	ELH	19	0	1	1	2	—	—	—	—	—
2024–25	Brantford Bulldogs	OHL	27	4	8	12	6	9	1	1	2	2
2025–26	Brantford Bulldogs	OHL	55	19	40	59	33	15	7	15	22	6
ELH totals			31	0	3	3	8	—	—	—	—	—

=== International ===
Year	Team	Event	Result	GP	G	A	Pts	PIM
2022	Czech Republic	U17	7th	6	1	1	2	6
2023	Czech Republic	U18	7th	5	0	1	1	2
2023	Czech Republic	HG18	2nd place, silver medalist(s)	5	0	3	3	4
2024	Czech Republic	WJC	3rd place, bronze medalist(s)	1	0	0	0	0
2025	Czech Republic	WJC	3rd place, bronze medalist(s)	7	0	5	5	0
2026	Czech Republic	WJC	2nd place, silver medalist(s)	7	5	1	6	2
Junior totals				31	6	11	17	14

Awards and achievements
Preceded by Theo Lindstein	St. Louis Blues first-round draft pick 2024	Succeeded by Justin Carbonneau
