= Lucas Pettersson =

Swedish ice hockey player (born 2006)

- Born: 17 April 2006 (age 20) Örnsköldsvik, Sweden
- Height: 5 ft 11 in (180 cm)
- Weight: 168 lb (76 kg; 12 st 0 lb)
- Position: Center
- Shoots: Left
- NHL team (P) Cur. team Former teams: Anaheim Ducks; San Diego Gulls (AHL); Modo Hockey; Brynäs IF
- NHL draft: 35th overall, 2024; Anaheim Ducks
- Playing career: 2023–present

Lucas Pettersson (born 17 April 2006) is a Swedish professional ice hockey player who is a center for the San Diego Gulls of the American Hockey League (AHL) as a prospect under contract to the Anaheim Ducks of the National Hockey League (NHL). He was drafted 35th overall by the Ducks in the 2024 NHL entry draft.

== Playing career ==
A product of the Modo Hockey system, Pettersson made his Swedish Hockey League (SHL) debut in November 2023, and signed a contract extension through 2027 on 8 December. In 44 games at the J20 Nationell level in 2023–24, he recorded 27 goals and 54 points. He also appeared in five games at the SHL level. Described as a defensive-minded, dual threat passer and shooter with a good snapshot, Pettersson was projected as a late first or early second round pick entering the 2024 NHL entry draft.

On 14 June 2025, Pettersson was signed to a three-year, entry-level contract with the Ducks. It was announced he would continue his development in the SHL, joining Brynäs IF for the 2025–26 season.

== International play ==
Medal record

Representing Sweden

Ice hockey

World Junior Championships
| Gold medal – first place | 2026 United States | |

World U18 Championships
| Bronze medal – third place | 2024 Finland | |

In December 2025, he was selected to represent Sweden at the 2026 World Junior Ice Hockey Championships. He recorded four goals and two assists in six games and won a gold medal. This was Sweden's first gold medal at the IIHF World Junior Championship since 2012.

== Career statistics ==
=== Regular season and playoffs ===
| | | | Regular season | | | | | Playoffs |
| Season | Team | League | GP | G | A | Pts | PIM | GP | G | A | Pts | PIM |
|---|---|---|---|---|---|---|---|---|---|---|---|---|
| 2022–23 | MoDo Hockey | J20 | 29 | 5 | 14 | 19 | 6 | — | — | — | — | — |
| 2023–24 | MoDo Hockey | J20 | 44 | 27 | 30 | 57 | 40 | — | — | — | — | — |
| 2023–24 | MoDo Hockey | SHL | 5 | 0 | 0 | 0 | 0 | — | — | — | — | — |
| 2024–25 | MoDo Hockey | J20 | 8 | 4 | 4 | 8 | 4 | — | — | — | — | — |
| 2024–25 | MoDo Hockey | SHL | 29 | 0 | 1 | 1 | 4 | — | — | — | — | — |
| 2024–25 | Östersunds IK | Allsv | 26 | 9 | 10 | 19 | 10 | — | — | — | — | — |
| 2025–26 | Brynäs IF | SHL | 41 | 10 | 10 | 20 | 0 | 5 | 0 | 4 | 4 | 2 |
| 2025–26 | San Diego Gulls | AHL | 4 | 0 | 0 | 0 | 0 | — | — | — | — | — |
| SHL totals | | | 75 | 10 | 11 | 21 | 4 | 5 | 0 | 4 | 4 | 2 |

=== International ===
| Year | Team | Event | Result | GP | G | A | Pts | PIM |
|---|---|---|---|---|---|---|---|---|
| 2022 | Sweden | U17 | 5th | 6 | 2 | 2 | 4 | 2 |
| 2023 | Sweden | HG18 | 5th | 4 | 2 | 2 | 4 | 0 |
| 2023 | Sweden | WJAC | 4th | 6 | 3 | 5 | 8 | 2 |
| 2024 | Sweden | U18 | 3rd place, bronze medalist(s) | 7 | 3 | 5 | 8 | 10 |
| 2026 | Sweden | WJC | 1st place, gold medalist(s) | 6 | 4 | 2 | 6 | 6 |
| Junior totals | | | | 29 | 14 | 16 | 30 | 20 |
