= Carlos Händel =

German ice hockey player (born 2007)

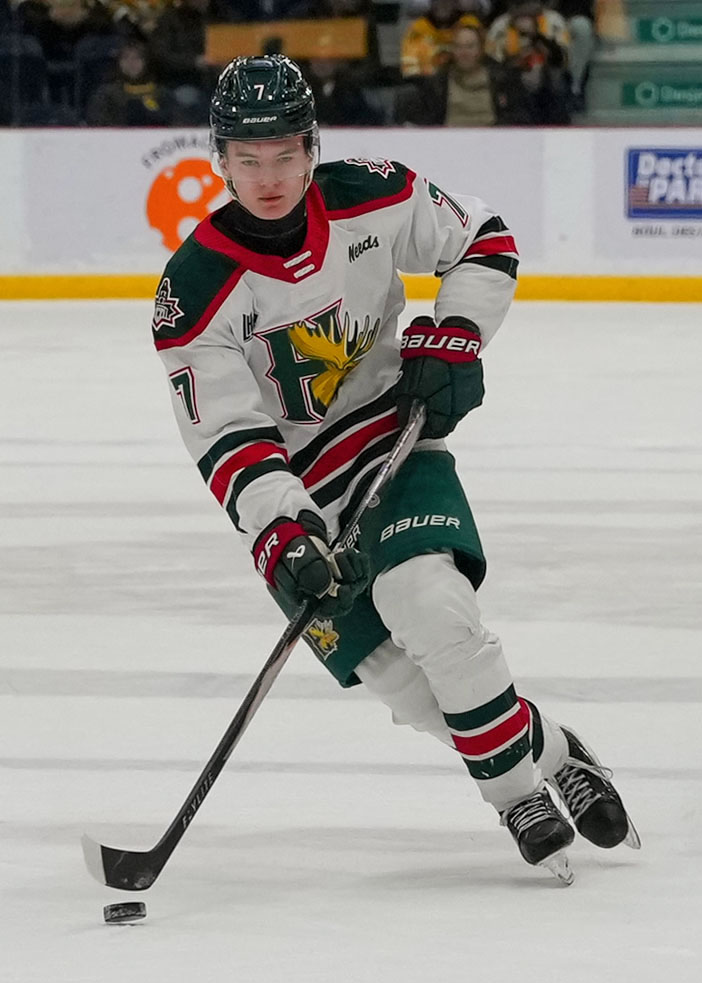
- Händel with the Halifax Mooseheads in 2026
- Born: 31 March 2007 (age 19) Erlangen, Germany
- Height: 6 ft 1 in (185 cm)
- Weight: 172 lb (78 kg; 12 st 4 lb)
- Position: Defence
- Shoots: Right
- DEL team: Kölner Haie
- NHL draft: 177th overall, 2025; Montreal Canadiens

Carlos Händel (born 31 March 2007) is a German professional ice hockey player who is a defenceman for Kölner Haie of the Deutsche Eishockey Liga (DEL). He was selected in the sixth round, 177th overall, by the Montreal Canadiens in the 2025 NHL entry draft.

== Playing career ==
=== Europe ===
Händel began his development in his native Germany, playing junior hockey with Jungadler Mannheim, the junior affiliate of the Deutsche Eishockey League (DEL)'s Adler Mannheim. He continued his career abroad in Sweden, playing for the affiliate of Frölunda HC. In 2024, he was selected by the Halifax Mooseheads of the Quebec Maritimes Junior Hockey League (QMJHL) in the first round of that year's CHL Import Draft.

=== North America ===
Joining the Mooseheads organization ahead of the 2024–25 season, Händel transitioned well to major junior play, finishing as the top scoring rookie blueliner in the QMJHL with 26 points in 52 total games. For his efforts, he was named to the league's All-Rookie Team. Entering the ensuing 2025 NHL entry draft as a top-75 ranked North American skater by the National Hockey League (NHL) Central Scouting Bureau, Händel was ultimately selected in the sixth round, 177th overall, by the Montreal Canadiens.

After attending the Canadiens' development and rookie camps during the 2025 offseason, he was reassigned to the QMJHL ranks for the 2025–26 season.

=== Kölner Haie ===
With the ambition to continue his development in the professional ranks, Händel opted to return to his native Germany in signing a one-year contract with Kölner Haie of the DEL on 9 June 2026.

== International play ==
Medal record

Representing Germany

Men's ice hockey

World U18 Championships Division I A
Gold medal – first place	2024 Denmark	

Internationally, Händel has represented Germany at both under-18 and under-20 levels of competition. In April 2024, he helped lead his country to victory at the IIHF World U18 Championship Division I A tournament to earn promotion to the top division. Serving as team captain the following year, Händel registered four points across tournament play, including a record-setting two goals over the span of 19 seconds in Germany's final round-robin game versus Switzerland.

Appearing in both the 2025 and 2026 iterations of the World Junior Championship, he contributed four assists in five games at the latter, culminating with a three-point effort during his country's relegation matchup against Denmark on 2 January 2026.

== Career statistics ==
=== Regular season and playoffs ===
			Regular season					Playoffs
Season	Team	League	GP	G	A	Pts	PIM	GP	G	A	Pts	PIM
2021–22	Jungadler Mannheim	DNL	36	8	20	28	10	—	—	—	—	—
2022–23	Jungadler Mannheim	DNL	12	6	19	25	16	—	—	—	—	—
2022–23	Frölunda HC U16	U16 SM	3	0	0	0	2	—	—	—	—	—
2023–24	Malmö Redhawks	J18	28	6	17	23	16	3	0	1	1	2
2023–24	Malmö Redhawks	J20	9	0	0	0	2	—	—	—	—	—
2024–25	Halifax Mooseheads	QMJHL	52	3	23	26	20	10	1	3	4	2
2025–26	Halifax Mooseheads	QMJHL	44	3	19	22	30	—	—	—	—	—
QMJHL totals			96	6	42	48	50	10	1	3	4	2

=== International ===
Year	Team	Event	Result	GP	G	A	Pts	PIM
2024	Germany	U18 D1A	1st place, gold medalist(s)	5	0	5	5	0
2024	Germany	HG18	6th	4	0	1	1	4
2025	Germany	U18	6th	4	2	2	4	2
2025	Germany	HG18	8th	4	1	1	2	2
2025	Germany	WJC	9th	5	0	0	0	2
2026	Germany	WJC	9th	5	0	4	4	2
Junior totals				27	3	13	16	12

== Awards and honours ==
Award	Year	Ref
DNL
U17 Champions	2022	
QMJHL
All-Rookie Team	2025	

== Records ==
IIHF World U18 Championships:

- Fastest two goals, single player: 19 sec (2025)
