= Harrison Brunicke =

South African-Canadian ice hockey player

- Born: May 8, 2006 (age 20) Johannesburg, South Africa
- Height: 6 ft 3 in (191 cm)
- Weight: 201 lb (91 kg; 14 st 5 lb)
- Position: Defence
- Shoots: Right
- NHL team (P) Cur. team: Pittsburgh Penguins; WBS Penguins (AHL)
- NHL draft: 44th overall, 2024; Pittsburgh Penguins
- Playing career: 2024–present

Harrison Brunicke (born May 8, 2006) is a South African-born Canadian professional ice hockey defenceman for the Wilkes-Barre/Scranton Penguins in the American Hockey League (AHL) as a prospect under contract to the Pittsburgh Penguins of the National Hockey League (NHL). He was drafted by the Penguins in the second round, 44th overall, in the 2024 NHL entry draft and made his NHL debut with the team in 2025.

== Playing career ==
As a youth, Brunicke played for the Calgary Royals under-15 and then under-18 squads, scoring 17 points in 29 games during the 2021–22 season. He also appeared in one game for the Brooks Bandits of the Alberta Junior Hockey League (AJHL) and in two games for the Kamloops Blazers of the Western Hockey League (WHL) during that season. He made the Blazers as a 16-year-old and appeared in 59 games during the 2022–23 season, scoring eight points and recording a goal in the Memorial Cup. He improved during the 2023–24 season and scored 10 goals and 21 points while appearing in 49 games for the Blazers.

Brunicke was selected by the Pittsburgh Penguins in the second round (44th overall) of the 2024 NHL entry draft, becoming the first South African-born skater ever to be selected in the NHL draft. He signed a three-year, entry-level contract with Pittsburgh on July 18, 2024. After scoring 30 points in 41 games for the Blazers in 2024–25, Brunicke was assigned to the Wilkes-Barre/Scranton Penguins and concluded the season with them, posting two assists in 10 games.

Brunicke made the Pittsburgh Penguins roster to open the 2025–26 NHL season. He made his NHL debut on October 7, 2025, against the New York Rangers on opening night, becoming the first skater from South Africa to play in the league. On October 9, he became the first South African player to score a goal in the NHL, scoring his first goal against the New York Islanders in a 4–3 win.

== International play ==
Medal record

Representing Canada

Ice hockey

World Junior Championships
Bronze medal – third place	2026 United States	

In 2021–22, Brunicke appeared in five games for Team Alberta at the WHL Cup. He has played for the Canada national under-18 hockey team at the U18 World Championships and participated in the national junior team summer camp in 2025.

In December 2025, he was selected to represent Canada at the 2026 World Junior Ice Hockey Championships. During the tournament he recorded two assists in seven games and won a bronze medal.

== Personal life ==
Brunicke was born on May 8, 2006, in Johannesburg, South Africa. His family moved to Calgary, Canada, in 2009, when he was age two. He initially played baseball and soccer before trying out ice hockey after a family at his school gave him a pair of used ice skates.

== Career statistics ==
=== Regular season and playoffs ===
			Regular season					Playoffs
Season	Team	League	GP	G	A	Pts	PIM	GP	G	A	Pts	PIM
2021–22	Brooks Bandits	AJHL	1	0	0	0	0	—	—	—	—	—
2021–22	Kamloops Blazers	WHL	2	0	0	0	0	—	—	—	—	—
2022–23	Kamloops Blazers	WHL	59	4	4	8	26	14	0	2	2	2
2023–24	Kamloops Blazers	WHL	49	10	11	21	48	—	—	—	—	—
2024–25	Kamloops Blazers	WHL	41	5	25	30	47	—	—	—	—	—
2024–25	Wilkes-Barre/Scranton Penguins	AHL	10	0	2	2	18	2	1	1	2	0
2025–26	Pittsburgh Penguins	NHL	9	1	0	1	6	—	—	—	—	—
2025–26	Wilkes-Barre/Scranton Penguins	AHL	11	1	7	8	2	15	2	5	7	12
2025–26	Kamloops Blazers	WHL	24	2	22	24	20	4	0	1	1	0
NHL totals			9	1	0	1	6	—	—	—	—	—

=== International ===
Year	Team	Event	Result	GP	G	A	Pts	PIM
2024	Canada	U18	1st place, gold medalist(s)	7	1	3	4	2
2026	Canada	WJC	3rd place, bronze medalist(s)	7	0	2	2	0
Junior totals				14	1	5	6	2
