= Alfons Freij =

Swedish ice hockey player (born 2006)

- Born: February 12, 2006 (age 20) Sölvesborg, Sweden
- Height: 6 ft 1 in (185 cm)
- Weight: 187 lb (85 kg; 13 st 5 lb)
- Position: Defense
- Shoots: Left
- NHL team (P) Cur. team Former teams: Winnipeg Jets; Manitoba Moose (AHL); Timrå IK
- NHL draft: 37th overall, 2024; Winnipeg Jets
- Playing career: 2024–present

Alfons Freij (born February 12, 2006) is a Swedish professional ice hockey player who is a defenseman for the Manitoba Moose of the American Hockey League (AHL) on loan from the Winnipeg Jets of the National Hockey League (NHL). He was selected in the second round, 37th overall, by the Jets in the 2024 NHL entry draft.

== Playing career ==
Freij played youth and junior hockey in the Sölvesborgs IK system, and also played at times for Olofströms IK and Karlskrona HK. At 16, he moved to the Växjö Lakers, where he played three seasons at the J20 Nationell level. In the 2023–24 season, he recorded 14 goals and 33 points in 40 games. Following the season, Freij was selected 37th overall, in the second round of the 2024 NHL entry draft by the Winnipeg Jets, their first selection of the draft.

For the 2024–25 season, Freij was loaned by the Lakers to IF Björklöven of the HockeyAllsvenskan, the second tier of professional hockey in Sweden.

After a lone season in the Allsvenskan, Freij was signed to a two-year contract with Timrå IK of the SHL, on April 18, 2025. He was later signed to a three-year, entry-level contract with draft club, the Winnipeg Jets of the NHL, however would continue on loan with Timrå IK on June 15, 2025.

== International play ==
Medal record

Representing Sweden

Ice hockey

World Junior Championships
| Gold medal – first place | 2026 United States | |

World U18 Championships
| Bronze medal – third place | 2024 Finland | |

At the 2024 World U18 Championship, Freij was the top scoring defender on the bronze-winning Team Sweden with six points in seven games.

In December 2025, he was selected to represent Sweden at the 2026 World Junior Ice Hockey Championships. He recorded seven assists in seven games and won a gold medal. This was Sweden's first gold medal at the IIHF World Junior Championship since 2012.

== Career statistics ==
=== Regular season and playoffs ===
| | | | Regular season | | | | | Playoffs |
| Season | Team | League | GP | G | A | Pts | PIM | GP | G | A | Pts | PIM |
|---|---|---|---|---|---|---|---|---|---|---|---|---|
| 2021–22 | Växjö Lakers | J20 | 8 | 0 | 1 | 1 | 2 | — | — | — | — | — |
| 2022–23 | Växjö Lakers | J20 | 32 | 0 | 8 | 8 | 10 | 3 | 0 | 1 | 1 | 0 |
| 2023–24 | Växjö Lakers | J20 | 40 | 14 | 19 | 33 | 14 | 5 | 2 | 1 | 3 | 2 |
| 2024–25 | IF Björklöven | J20 | 5 | 2 | 3 | 5 | 2 | 2 | 0 | 2 | 2 | 4 |
| 2024–25 | IF Björklöven | Allsv | 29 | 2 | 6 | 8 | 12 | — | — | — | — | — |
| 2025–26 | Timrå IK | SHL | 42 | 6 | 5 | 11 | 14 | — | — | — | — | — |
| 2025–26 | Manitoba Moose | AHL | 5 | 0 | 1 | 1 | 2 | — | — | — | — | — |
| SHL totals | | | 42 | 6 | 5 | 11 | 14 | — | — | — | — | — |

=== International ===
| Year | Team | Event | Result | GP | G | A | Pts | PIM |
|---|---|---|---|---|---|---|---|---|
| 2022 | Sweden | U17 | 5th | 6 | 1 | 2 | 3 | 4 |
| 2022 | Sweden | WJAC | 3rd place, bronze medalist(s) | 6 | 1 | 0 | 1 | 4 |
| 2023 | Sweden | HG18 | 5th | 4 | 1 | 3 | 4 | 8 |
| 2023 | Sweden | WJAC | 4th | 6 | 2 | 5 | 7 | 0 |
| 2024 | Sweden | U18 | 3rd place, bronze medalist(s) | 7 | 2 | 4 | 6 | 8 |
| 2026 | Sweden | WJC | 1st place, gold medalist(s) | 7 | 0 | 7 | 7 | 2 |
| Junior totals | | | | 36 | 7 | 21 | 28 | 26 |
