= Leo Sahlin Wallenius =

Swedish ice hockey player (born 2004)

- Born: April 10, 2006 (age 20) Skövde, Sweden
- Height: 183 cm (6 ft 0 in)
- Weight: 79.9 kg (176 lb; 12 st 8 lb)
- Position: Defence
- Shoots: Left
- NHL team (P) Cur. team Former teams: San Jose Sharks; San Jose Barracuda (AHL); Nybro Vikings; TPS; Växjö Lakers
- NHL draft: 53rd overall, 2024; San Jose Sharks
- Playing career: 2024–present

Leo Sahlin Wallenius (born April 10, 2006) is a Swedish professional ice hockey defenceman playing for San Jose Barracuda of the American Hockey League (AHL) while under contract to the San Jose Sharks of the National Hockey League (NHL). Sahlin Wallenius was selected in the second round, 53rd overall, by the Sharks in the 2024 NHL entry draft. Sahlin Wallenius joined TPS of the Liiga on loan during the 2024–25 Liiga season, appearing in seven games.

== Playing career ==
On 18 April 2025, Sahlin Wallenius was signed by the Sharks to a three-year, entry-level contract, remaining on loan to continue his development with the Lakers for the 2025–26 season.

== International play ==
Medal record

Representing Sweden

Ice hockey

World Junior Championships
Gold medal – first place	2026 United States	

World U18 Championships
Bronze medal – third place	2024 Finland	

In December 2025, he was selected to represent Sweden at the 2026 World Junior Ice Hockey Championships. He recorded one goal and five assists in seven games and won a gold medal. This was Sweden's first gold medal at the IIHF World Junior Championship since 2012.

== Career statistics ==
=== Regular season and playoffs ===
			Regular season					Playoffs
Season	Team	League	GP	G	A	Pts	PIM	GP	G	A	Pts	PIM
2021–22	Växjö Lakers	J20	5	0	2	2	6	—	—	—	—	—
2022–23	Växjö Lakers	J20	30	2	6	8	6	3	0	0	0	0
2023–24	Växjö Lakers	J20	43	11	31	42	38	5	0	3	3	2
2024–25	Växjö Lakers	J20	8	3	11	14	2	2	0	2	2	4
2024–25	Växjö Lakers	SHL	16	1	4	5	0	—	—	—	—	—
2024–25	Nybro Vikings	Allsv	14	1	5	6	12	—	—	—	—	—
2024–25	TPS	Liiga	7	1	2	3	2	—	—	—	—	—
2025–26	Växjö Lakers	SHL	32	3	10	13	14	10	2	4	6	2
SHL totals			48	4	14	18	14	10	2	4	6	2

=== International ===
Year	Team	Event	Result	GP	G	A	Pts	PIM
2023	Sweden	HG18	5th	4	1	4	5	6
2024	Sweden	U18	3rd place, bronze medalist(s)	7	0	3	3	12
2026	Sweden	WJC	1st place, gold medalist(s)	7	1	5	6	2
Junior totals				18	2	12	14	20
