= Sascha Boumedienne =

Swedish ice hockey player (born 2007)

- Born: January 17, 2007 (age 19) Oulu, Finland
- Height: 6 ft 1 in (185 cm)
- Weight: 175 lb (79 kg; 12 st 7 lb)
- Position: Defence
- Shoots: Left
- HE team: Boston University
- NHL draft: 28th overall, 2025; Winnipeg Jets

Sascha Boumedienne (born January 17, 2007) is a Swedish ice hockey player for the Boston University of the Hockey East. Boumedienne was drafted 28th overall by the Winnipeg Jets in the 2025 NHL entry draft.

== Personal life ==
Boumedienne was born in Oulu, Finland, but he spent most of his youth in Sweden and the United States. His father, Josef Boumedienne, is a Swedish former professional hockey player who appeared in 47 NHL games but spent most of his 17-year career in Europe and was playing for Oulun Kärpät at the time of Sascha Boumedienne's birth. Boumedienne is of Finnish descent through his paternal grandmother and Algerian descent through his paternal grandfather.

== International play ==
Medal record

Representing Sweden

Ice hockey

World Junior Championships
Gold medal – first place	2026 United States	

World U18 Championships
Silver medal – second place	2025 United States	

In December 2025, he was selected to represent Sweden at the 2026 World Junior Ice Hockey Championships. He recorded two goals and two assists in seven games and won a gold medal. This was Sweden's first gold medal at the IIHF World Junior Championship since 2012.

== Career statistics ==
			Regular season					Playoffs
Season	Team	League	GP	G	A	Pts	PIM	GP	G	A	Pts	PIM
2023–24	Youngstown Phantoms	USHL	49	3	24	27	32	2	0	0	0	0
2024–25	Boston University	HE	40	3	10	13	33	—	—	—	—	—
2025–26	Boston University	HE	35	2	8	10	14	—	—	—	—	—
NCAA totals			75	5	18	23	47	—	—	—	—	—

=== International ===
Year	Team	Event	Result	GP	G	A	Pts	PIM
2023	Sweden	U17	3rd place, bronze medalist(s)	7	1	3	4	6
2024	Sweden	HG18	3rd place, bronze medalist(s)	5	0	0	0	0
2025	Sweden	U18	2nd place, silver medalist(s)	7	1	13	14	2
2026	Sweden	WJC	1st place, gold medalist(s)	7	2	2	4	6
Junior totals				26	4	18	22	14

Awards and achievements
Preceded by Colby Barlow	Winnipeg Jets first-round draft pick 2025	Succeeded by Viggo Björck
