= 2026 World Junior Ice Hockey Championships =

Ice hockey tournament in Minneapolis–Saint Paul

2026 IIHF World Junior Championship

Tournament details
- Host country: United States
- Cities: Minneapolis; Saint Paul
- Venue(s): Grand Casino Arena; 3M Arena at Mariucci
- Dates: December 26, 2025 – January 5, 2026
- Teams: 10

Final positions
- Champions: Sweden (3rd title)
- Runners-up: Czechia
- Third place: Canada
- Fourth place: Finland

Tournament statistics
- Games played: 29
- Goals scored: 221 (7.62 per game)
- Attendance: 184,708 (6,369 per game)
- Scoring leader: (Canada) Michael Hage (15 points)

Awards
- MVP: (Czech Republic) Vojtěch Čihař

Official website
- www.iihf.com

The 2026 World Junior Ice Hockey Championships (2026 WJC) was the 50th Ice Hockey World Junior Championships, held from December 26, 2025, to January 5, 2026. Sweden won their third championship (first since 2012), defeating Czechia 4–2 in the gold medal game.

== Top Division ==
=== Background ===
The tournament returned to Minneapolis–Saint Paul after being previously co-hosted there in 1982. This was the seventh time that the United States hosted the WJC and first time since 2018.

=== Venues ===
The tournament games were played at two arenas:

- Grand Casino Arena in Saint Paul, and
- 3M Arena at Mariucci in Minneapolis.

Saint Paul	Minneapolis–Saint Paul is located in the United States	Minneapolis
Grand Casino Arena Capacity: 17,954	Minneapolis–Saint Paul is located in the United States	3M Arena at Mariucci Capacity: 10,257

=== Qualified teams ===
Ten teams took part in the competition. Denmark returned for the first time since 2019, replacing Kazakhstan who were relegated back to Division I, Group A, after finishing last in 2025.

Team	Qualification method	Appearance(s) (Note: In top division. Results in tiers below are excluded.)				Previous best performance (Note: Bold text indicates they hosted that edition.)
Team	Qualification method	Total	First	Last	Streak	Previous best performance
United States	First in 2025	50th	1977	2025	50	**Champions** (2004, 2010, 2013, 2017, 2021, 2024, 2025)
Finland	Second in 2025	50th	1977	2025	50	**Champions** (1987, **1998**, 2014, **2016**, 2019)
Czechia	Third in 2025	50th	1977	2025	50	**Champions** (2000, 2001)
Sweden	Fourth in 2025	50th	1977	2025	50	**Champions** (1981, 2012)
Canada	Fifth in 2025	50th	1977	2025	50	**Champions** (20 times) (Note: Canada have won in 1982, 1985, 1988, 1990, 1991, 1993, 1994, 1995, 1996, 1997, 2005, 2006, 2007, 2008, 2009, 2015, 2018, 2020, 2022 and 2023.)
Slovakia	Sixth in 2025	31st	1996	2025	31	Third place (1999, 2015)
Latvia	Seventh in 2025	11th	2006	2025	5	Seventh place (2022, 2025)
Switzerland	Eighth in 2025	39th	1978	2025	17	Third place (1998)
Germany	Ninth in 2025	32nd	1977	2025	7	Fifth place (**1981**)
Denmark	Champions of Division I A	8th	2008	2019	1	Fifth place (2017)

=== Match officials ===
The following officials were assigned by the IIHF to officiate the 2026 World Junior Championships.

Referees

- (Switzerland) Cedric Borga
- (Austria) Andreas Huber
- (Slovakia) Martin Jobbágy
- (United States) John Lindner
- (Sweden) Richard Magnusson
- (Czech Republic) Tomáš Mejzlík
- (Canada) Troy Murray
- (Sweden) Alexander Österberg
- (United States) Rocco Stachowiak
- (United States) Adam Tobias
- (Canada) Hayden Verbeek
- (Finland) Janne Wuorenheimo

Linesmen

- (Canada) Nicholas Albinati
- (United States) Scott Allan
- (Denmark) Albert Ankerstjerne
- (United States) Bryan Gorcoff
- (United States) Matthew Heinen
- (Canada) Anthony LaPointe
- (Finland) Luka Mäkinen
- (Finland) Joni Pekkala
- (Canada) Luke Pye
- (Switzerland) Michael Stalder
- (Sweden) Rasmus Strömberg
- (Czech Republic) David Thuma

=== Rosters ===
To be eligible as a junior player, a player couldn't be born earlier than 2006. A maximum of 22 skaters and 3 goalkeepers could be named to a roster, with a maximum of 20 skaters and 2 goalkeepers dressing each game.

=== Preliminary round ===
==== Seeding ====
Group A
(Grand Casino Arena)

- United States (1)
- Sweden (4)
- Slovakia (6) (Note: The organizers swapped Slovakia and Canada in the group alignments to boost attendance.)
- Switzerland (8)
- Germany (9)

Group B
(3M Arena at Mariucci)

- Finland (2)
- Czechia (3)
- Canada (5)
- Latvia (7)
- Denmark (11–promoted)

Tie-breaking criteria
The ranking of teams in the group stage was determined as follows:
1. points;
2. head-to-head points;
3. head-to-head goal difference;
4. head-to-head number of goals scored;
5. result against closest best-ranked team outside tied teams;
6. result against next best-ranked team outside tied teams;
7. seeding before tournament.

All times are local, CST (UTC−6).

==== Group A ====
Pos	Team	Pld	W	OTW	OTL	L	GF	GA	GD	Pts	Qualification
1	Sweden	4	4	0	0	0	21	8	+13	**12**	Quarterfinals
2	United States (H)	4	3	0	0	1	17	15	+2	**9**	Quarterfinals
3	Switzerland	4	2	0	0	2	10	8	+2	**6**	Quarterfinals
4	Slovakia	4	1	0	0	3	13	13	0	**3**	Quarterfinals
5	Germany	4	0	0	0	4	5	22	−17	**0**	Relegation round

Source: IIHF
Rules for classification: Tiebreakers
(H) Host

December 26, 2025; 12:00pm	**Sweden**	**3–2** (0–0, 2–1, 1–1)	Slovakia	Grand Casino Arena, Saint Paul; Attendance: 5,125

Game reference

Love Härenstam
Goalies
Alan Lendák
Referees:
(United States) John Lindner
(Finland) Janne Wuorenheimo
Linesmen:
(Canada) Nicholas Albinati
(Czech Republic) David Thuma

Frondell (Freij, Stenberg) (PP) – 29:05	1–0
Eklund (Frondell, Berglund) (PP) – 33:16	2–0
	2–1	39:56 – Pobežal (Mišiak) (PP2)
	2–2	50:55 – Tomík (Pitka)
Stenberg (Genborg) – 56:03	3–2

10 min
Penalties
8 min
32
Shots
25

December 26, 2025; 5:00pm	Germany	**3–6** (1–3, 2–3, 0–0)	**United States**	Grand Casino Arena, Saint Paul; Attendance: 14,276

Game reference

Lennart Neisse
Goalies
Caleb Heil
Referees:
(Switzerland) Cedric Borga
(Sweden) Richard Magnusson
Linesmen:
(Canada) Anthony LaPointe
(Finland) Joni Pekkala

	0–1	05:34 – Plante (Stiga, Kleber)
	0–2	10:53 – Reid (Zellers, McMorrow)
	0–3	15:55 – Horcoff (Ziemer, Hagens)
Kose (Händel, Schwarz) – 17:39	1–3
Seidl (Willhoft) – 25:46	2–3
	2–4	30:31 – Zellers (Hutson, Spellacy)
Boos (Willhoft, Kretzschmar) – 31:27	3–4
	3–5	34:58 – Zellers (Spellacy)
	3–6	38:07 – Eiserman (Hutson)

6 min
Penalties
6 min
21
Shots
47

December 27, 2025; 1:00pm	**Slovakia**	**4–1** (2–0, 1–0, 1–1)	Germany	Grand Casino Arena, Saint Paul; Attendance: 3,702

Game reference

Michal Prádel
Goalies
Linus Veillard
Referees:
(Austria) Andreas Huber
(Canada) Hayden Verbeek
Linesmen:
(Canada) Luke Pye
(Switzerland) Michael Stalder

Chrenko (Nemec, Murin) – 05:34	1–0
Chrenko (Nemec, Straka) (PP) – 19:12	2–0
Chrenko (Svrček, Radivojevič) (PP) – 33:23	3–0
	3–1	51:09 – Willhoft (Lewandowski)
Beluško (SH, ENG) – 59:07	4–1

4 min
Penalties
14 min
38
Shots
35

December 27, 2025; 5:00pm	**United States**	**2–1** (0–0, 2–1, 0–0)	Switzerland	Grand Casino Arena, Saint Paul; Attendance: 13,984

Game reference

Nicholas Kempf
Goalies
Christian Kirsch
Referees:
(Czech Republic) Tomáš Mejzlík
(Canada) Troy Murray
Linesmen:
(Canada) Nicholas Albinati
(Finland) Luka Mäkinen

Ziemer (Hagens, Horcoff) – 21:12	1–0
	1–1	32:34 – Sansonnens (Grossniklaus, Steiner)
Zellers (McKinney) – 34:40	2–1

4 min
Penalties
6 min
20
Shots
17

December 28, 2025; 1:00pm	**Sweden**	**4–2** (1–1, 0–1, 3–0)	Switzerland	Grand Casino Arena, Saint Paul; Attendance: 4,825

Game reference

Love Härenstam
Goalies
Elijah Neuenschwander
Referees:
(Czech Republic) Tomáš Mejzlík
(Finland) Janne Wuorenheimo
Linesmen:
(United States) Scott Allan
(Canada) Anthony LaPointe

Nilson (Sahlin Wallenius) – 00:53	1–0
	1–1	14:27 – Waidacher (Muggli, Ustinkov)
	1–2	38:22 – Steiner (Ustinkov, Muggli)
V. Björck (Freij, Frondell) – 40:57	2–2
Pettersson (Danielsson, Nilson) – 46:28	3–2
Pettersson (Stenberg) (ENG) – 59:13	4–2

6 min
Penalties
10 min
30
Shots
30

December 29, 2025; 12:00pm	Germany	**1–8** (1–1, 0–4, 0–3)	**Sweden**	Grand Casino Arena, Saint Paul; Attendance: 4,122

Game reference

Linus Veillard
Lukas Stuhrmann
Goalies
Herman Liv
Referees:
(United States) Rocco Stachowiak
(United States) Adam Tobias
Linesmen:
(United States) Bryan Gorcoff
(United States) Matthew Heinen

	0–1	01:45 – Frondell (Freij, Eklund) (PP)
Pul (Schafer) – 07:04	1–1
	1–2	21:03 – V. Björck (Boumedienne, Ohrqvist)
	1–3	28:11 – Berglund (Sahlin Wallenius, Carell)
	1–4	35:26 – V. Björck (Sahlin Wallenius, Danielsson) (PP)
	1–5	39:29 – Boumedienne (Ohrqvist)
	1–6	45:34 – Frondell (Freij) (PP)
	1–7	57:25 – Danielsson (Petterson, Genborg) (PP)
	1–8	59:59 – Berglund (Genborg, Håkansson)

12 min
Penalties
6 min
17
Shots
44

December 29, 2025; 5:00pm	Slovakia	**5–6** (2–0, 2–4, 1–2)	**United States**	Grand Casino Arena, Saint Paul; Attendance: 13,052

Game reference

Michal Prádel
Goalies
Caleb Heil
Referees:
(Switzerland) Cedric Borgia
(Austria) Andreas Huber
Linesmen:
(Canada) Nicholas Albinati
(Finland) Luka Mäkinen

Pitka (Tomík, Fabus) – 08:53	1–0
Chrenko (Radivojevič) (PP) – 11:15	2–0
	2–1	21:50 – Spellacy (McMorrow) (SH)
Beluško (Straka) (SH) – 26:46	3–1
	3–2	28:33 – McMorrow (Bednarik, Spellacy)
	3–3	31:00 – Lee (Mooney, Zellers) (PP)
Svrček (Straka) (PP) – 34:44	4–3
	4–4	39:15 – Hagens (Stiga, Reid)
	4–5	40:18 – Hagens (Reid, Ziemer)
	4–6	44:34 – Zellers (Ziemer, Mooney) (PP)
Chrenko (Radivojevič, Nemec) (EA) – 58:06	5–6

10 min
Penalties
8 min
31
Shots
41

December 30, 2025; 1:00pm	**Switzerland**	**4–0** (2–0, 2–0, 0–0)	Germany	Grand Casino Arena, Saint Paul; Attendance: 3,805

Game reference

Christian Kirsch
Goalies
Lennart Neisse
Referees:
(Slovakia) Martin Jobbágy
(Sweden) Alexander Österberg
Linesmen:
(United States) Scott Allan
(Finland) Joni Pekkala

Koerbler (Meier, Blessing) – 11:42	1–0
Reber (Muggli, Steiner) (PP) – 13:10	2–0
Koerbler – 21:06	3–0
Johnson (Sansonnens, Mottard) – 26:10	4–0

8 min
Penalties
12 min
48
Shots
20

December 31, 2025; 12:00pm	**Switzerland**	**3–2** (2–0, 1–0, 0–2)	Slovakia	Grand Casino Arena, Saint Paul; Attendance: 3,864

Game reference

Elijah Neuenschwander
Goalies
Michal Prádel
Referees:
(Sweden) Richard Magnusson
(Canada) Hayden Verbeek
Linesmen:
(Canada) Luke Pye
(Sweden) Rasmus Stromberg

Wey (Reber, Johnson) (PP) – 18:05	1–0
Aeschlimann (Ustinkov, Muggli) (PP) – 18:27	2–0
Haas (Koerbler, Meier) — 36:43	3–0
	3–1	47:41 – Nemec (Chrenko, Radivojevič)
	3–2	59:50 – Radivojevič (Nemec, Chrenko) (EA)

4 min
Penalties
8 min
18
Shots
22

December 31, 2025; 5:00pm	United States	**3–6** (0–1, 2–4, 1–1)	**Sweden**	Grand Casino Arena, Saint Paul; Attendance: 18,618

Game reference

Brady Knowling
Nick Kempf
Goalies
Love Härenstam
Referees:
(Canada) Troy Murray
(Finland) Janne Wuorenheimo
Linesmen:
(Canada) Anthony LaPointe
(Finland) Joni Pekkala

	0–1	09:17 – Juustovaara (Freij, Nilson)
	0–2	23:01 – Genborg (Danielsson, V. Björck) (PP)
	0–3	26:01 – Pettersson (Berglund, Håkansson)
Reid (Eiserman, Ziemer) (PP) – 28:55	1–3
	1–4	32:44 – Pettersson (Berglund) (SH)
	1–5	35:15 – Genborg (V. Björck, Danielsson) (PP)
Zellers (Ziemer, Hagens) – 36:44	2–5
Stiga (Mooney, Lee) (PP) – 42:30	3–5
	3–6	46:43 – Stenberg (Berglund, Eklund) (PP2)

8 min
Penalties
12 min
31
Shots
43

==== Group B ====
Pos	Team	Pld	W	OTW	OTL	L	GF	GA	GD	Pts	Qualification
1	Canada	4	3	1	0	0	25	11	+14	**11**	Quarterfinals
2	Czechia	4	2	1	0	1	18	12	+6	**8**	Quarterfinals
3	Finland	4	2	0	1	1	19	11	+8	**7**	Quarterfinals
4	Latvia	4	1	0	1	2	9	17	−8	**4**	Quarterfinals
5	Denmark	4	0	0	0	4	8	28	−20	**0**	Relegation round

Source: IIHF
Rules for classification: Tiebreakers

December 26, 2025; 2:30pm	Denmark	**2–6** (1–3, 0–3, 1–0)	**Finland**	3M Arena at Mariucci, Minneapolis; Attendance: 2,935

Game reference

Anton Wilde
Goalies
Petteri Rimpinen
Referees:
(Austria) Andreas Huber
(Canada) Troy Murray
Linesmen:
(United States) Matthew Heinen
(Switzerland) Michael Stalder

	0–1	01:49 – Vesterinen (Kuhta, Tuuva)
	0–2	02:19 – Kalto (Westergård, Kiviharju)
Bundegaard (Amondsen, E. Jakobsen) – 06:08	1–2
	1–3	10:07 – Suvanto (Kuhta, Boelius) (PP)
	1–4	24:45 – Koivu (Kiviharju, Ruohonen)
	1–5	26:19 – Saarelainen (Boelius, Vanhanen) (PP)
	1–6	31:21 – Vesterinen (Kuhta, Tuuva)
Linde (M. Jakobsen, Larsen) (PP) – 42:22	2–6

4 min
Penalties
6 min
10
Shots
43

December 26, 2025; 7:30pm	Czechia	**5–7** (1–2, 2–1, 2–4)	**Canada**	3M Arena at Mariucci, Minneapolis; Attendance: 5,502

Game reference

Michal Orsulák
Goalies
Carter George
Referees:
(Sweden) Alexander Österberg
(United States) Adam Tobias
Linesmen:
(United States) Scott Allan
(Finland) Luka Mäkinen

	0–1	13:53 – Martin (McKenna, Hage)
Poletín (Benák, Pšenička) – 17:01	1–1
	1–2	17:38 – Hage (Martin, Danford)
Čihař (Benák, Man) (EA) – 24:02	2–2
Sikora (Čihař, Nestrašil) – 32:13	3–2
	3–3	37:02 – Parekh (Reid, Desnoyers)
	3–4	43:09 – Parekh (McKenna, Reschny) (PP)
Poletín (Sikora, Galvas) – 45:21	4–4
	4–5	46:32 – Iginla (Misa, MacKenzie)
	4–6	49:12 – MacKenzie (Hage)
Galvas (Nestrašil, Čihař) – 55:26	5–6
	5–7	59:00 – Martone (Beaudoin, MacKenzie) (ENG)

6 min
Penalties
6 min
33
Shots
27

December 27, 2025; 3:30pm	Latvia	**1–2 OT** (0–0, 0–1, 1–0) (OT: 0–1)	**Canada**	3M Arena at Mariucci, Minneapolis; Attendance: 4,146

Game reference

Nils Mauriņš
Goalies
Jack Ivankovic
Referees:
(Slovakia) Martin Jobbágy
(Sweden) Richard Magnusson
Linesmen:
(Denmark) Albert Ankerst Jerne
(Sweden) Rasmus Strömberg

	0–1	22:22 – Reschny (McKenna, Brunicke) (PP)
Bērzkalns (Sārts, Diļevka) – 58:02	1–1
	1–2	60:44 – Hage (McKenna, Parekh) (PP)

29 min
Penalties
6 min
27
Shots
38

December 27, 2025; 7:30pm	Denmark	**2–7** (1–2, 1–3, 0–2)	**Czechia**	3M Arena at Mariucci, Minneapolis; Attendance: 3,067

Game reference

Anton Wilde
Goalies
Matyáš Mařík
Referees:
(Switzerland) Cedric Borga
(United States) Rocco Stachowiak
Linesmen:
(United States) Bryan Gorcoff
(United States) Matthew Heinen

	0–1	02:56 – Čihař (Galvas, Nestrašil)
Petersen (E. Jakobsen, Olesen) – 05:53	1–1
	1–2	11:57 – Kubiesa (Sikora, Galvas) (PP)
	1–3	21:45 – Nestrašil (Jiříček, Benák) (PP)
Larsen (Baerentsen) – 24:39	2–3
	2–4	31:20 – Jiříček (Novotný)
	2–5	35:01 – Hoch (Klíma)
	2–6	45:41 – Galvas (Sikora, Novotný) (PP)
	2–7	46:39 – Žemlička

35 min
Penalties
6 min
22
Shots
53

December 28, 2025; 3:30pm	**Finland**	**8–0** (3–0, 2–0, 3–0)	Latvia	3M Arena at Mariucci, Minneapolis; Attendance: 3,152

Game reference

Petteri Rimpinen
Goalies
Mikus Vecvanags
Referees:
(Sweden) Alexander Österberg
(United States) Adam Tobias
Linesmen:
(United States) Bryan Gorcoff
(Czech Republic) David Thuma

Hemming (Vanhanen) – 04:11	1–0
Kuhta (Westergård) – 14:19	2–0
Westergard (Nykyri, Miettinen) – 19:16	3–0
Hemming (Vanhanen, Kiviharju) (PP2) – 21:37	4–0
Saarelainen (Ruohonen, Boelius) – 34:06	5–0
Vesterinen (Nykyri, Kuhta) – 42:51	6–0
Ruohonen (Koivu, Piiparinen) – 45:35	7–0
Boelius (Ruohonen, Saarelainen) – 50:31	8–0

4 min
Penalties
6 min
41
Shots
7

December 29, 2025; 2:30pm	Finland	**1–2 OT** (0–1, 0–0, 1–0) (OT: 0–1)	**Czechia**	3M Arena at Mariucci, Minneapolis; Attendance: 3,235

Game reference

Petteri Rimpinen
Goalies
Michal Orsulák
Referees:
(Canada) Troy Murray
(Canada) Hayden Verbeek
Linesmen:
(Denmark) Albert Ankerst Jerne
(Canada) Luke Pye

	0–1	01:52 – Kubiesa (Galvas, Čihař) (PP)
Hemming (Tuuva, Ruohonen) (EA) – 59:40	1–1
	1–2	63:39 – Jiříček (Sikora, Čihař)

31 min
Penalties
10 min
24
Shots
26

December 29, 2025; 7:30pm	**Canada**	**9–1** (3–0, 2–1, 4–0)	Denmark	3M Arena at Mariucci, Minneapolis; Attendance: 4,401

Game reference

Carter George
Goalies
Patrick Tiedjen
Referees:
(Slovakia) Martin Jobbágy
(Finland) Janne Wuorenheimo
Linesmen:
(Finland) Joni Pekkala
(Sweden) Rasmus Strömberg

McKenna (Hage, Martin) (PP) – 03:17	1–0
Cootes (Iginla, Verhoeff) – 08:36	2–0
Parekh (Desnoyers, Beaudoin) – 10:03	3–0
	3–1	20:28 – Klyvo
Martone (Parekh, Misa) (PP) – 26:11	4–1
McKenna (Martin, MacKenzie) – 35:03	5–1
Misa (Martone, Aitcheson) – 44:41	6–1
McKenna (Hage, Martin) – 45:44	7–1
Aitcheson (Desnoyers, O'Reilly) – 54:16	8–1
Martone (Misa, Iginla) – 54:40	9–1

2 min
Penalties
6 min
49
Shots
13

December 30, 2025; 3:30pm	**Latvia**	**6–3** (1–0, 3–2, 2–1)	Denmark	3M Arena at Mariucci, Minneapolis; Attendance: 2,781

Game reference

Nils Mauriņš
Goalies
Anton Wilde
Referees:
(United States) John Lindner
(Czech Republic) Tomáš Mejzlík
Linesmen:
(Canada) Anthony LaPointe
(Switzerland) Michael Stalder

Sārts (Osmanis, Ansons) – 16:52	1–0
Šmits (Ansons, Murnieks) (PP) – 23:00	2–0
	2–1	31:37 – Larsen (Bundegaard, Petersen)
Sieradzkis (Šmits, Ansons) (PP) – 34:54	3–1
Antons Macijevskis (Vītols, Naudiņš) – 36:43	4–1
	4–2	38:31 – Bundegaard (Larsen, Rundh)
Osmanis (Šmits, Sieradzkis) (PP) – 49:52	5–2
	5–3	58:43 – Linde (M. Jakobsen, Bundegaard) (EA)
Šmits (Murnieks) (ENG) – 59:59	6–3

8 min
Penalties
14 min
42
Shots
12

December 31, 2025; 2:30pm	**Czechia**	**4–2** (2–1, 1–0, 1–1)	Latvia	3M Arena at Mariucci, Minneapolis; Attendance: 3,301

Game reference

Matyáš Mařík
Goalies
Nils Mauriņš
Mikus Vecvanags
Referees:
(Switzerland) Cedric Borga
(United States) Adam Tobias
Linesmen:
(Denmark) Albert Ankerstjerne
(Finland) Luka Makinen

	0–1	06:00 – Ansons (Osmanis, Šmits) (PP)
Poletín (Galvas, Curran) – 10:04	1–1
Jiříček (Benák, Nestrašil) (PP) – 11:19	2–1
Pšenička (Curran, Man) – 25:31	3–1
	3–2	46:39 – Sieradzkis (Osmanis, Murnieks) (PP)
Nestrašil (Čihař) (ENG) – 58:43	4–2

12 min
Penalties
10 min
29
Shots
10

December 31, 2025; 7:30pm	**Canada**	**7–4** (3–3, 2–1, 2–0)	Finland	3M Arena at Mariucci, Minneapolis; Attendance: 7,582

Game reference

Carter George
Goalies
Petteri Rimpinen
Referees:
(United States) John Lindner
(United States) Rocco Stachowiak
Linesmen:
(United States) Matthew Heinen
(Czech Republic) David Thuma

Parekh (Martone, Iginla) – 01:13	1–0
	1–1	03:54 – Miettinen (Vanhanen)
Martin (Hage, McKenna) – 04:26	2–1
	2–2	05:40 – Suvanto (Vesterinen)
Martin (Hage, Parekh) (PP) – 10:40	3–2
	3–3	12:59 – Boelius (Vanhanen, Kuhta) (PP)
Iginla (Parekh, George) (PP) – 29:35	4–3
Beaudoin (Desnoyers, O'Reilly) – 37:05	5–3
	5–4	37:40 – Vesterinen
Beaudoin (O'Reilly, Desnoyers) – 48:20	6–4
O'Reilly (Beaudoin) (ENG) – 58:56	7–4

10 min
Penalties
8 min
32
Shots
18

=== Relegation round ===
January 2, 2026; 11:30am	**Germany**	**8–4** (2–1, 2–2, 4–1)	Denmark	3M Arena at Mariucci, Minneapolis; Attendance: 2,645

Game reference

Linus Vieillard
Goalies
Anton Wilde
Referees:
(Czech Republic) Tomáš Mejzlík
(Canada) Hayden Verbeek
Linesmen:
(Switzerland) Michael Stalder
(Sweden) Rasmus Strömberg

Lewandowski (Willhoft, Boos) – 03:37	1–0
Schäfer (Boos, Händel) (PP) – 07:06	2–0
	2–1	17:10 – Klyvo (Larsen, M. Jakobsen) (PP)
Schams (Lewandowski, Boos) – 22:08	3–1
Seidl (Willhoft) – 24:48	4–1
	4–2	26:28 – Klyvo (Larsen, M. Jakobsen) (PP)
	4–3	30:05 – Green (Bundgaard)
Willhoft (Lewandowski, Händel) (PP2) – 45:04	5–3
Schams (Händel, Seidl) – 50:04	6–3
	6–4	51:21 – Linde (Schioldan, Klyvo)
Boos (Schäfer, Willhoft) (PP) – 52:23	7–4
Schwarz (Seidl, ENG) – 58:57	8–4

8 min
Penalties
10 min
37
Shots
22

=== Playoff round ===
Quarterfinal winners were reseeded for the semifinals in accordance with the following ranking:

1. Placement in group
2. Points in preliminary round
3. Goal differential in preliminary round
4. Number of goals scored in preliminary round
5. Seeding coming into the tournament

Rank	Team	Group	Pos	Pts	GD	GF	Seed
1	Sweden	A	1	12	+13	21	4
2	Canada	B	1	11	+14	25	5
3	United States	A	2	9	+2	17	1
4	Czechia	B	2	8	+6	18	3
5	Finland	B	3	7	+8	19	2
6	Switzerland	A	3	6	+2	10	8
7	Latvia	B	4	4	–8	9	7
8	Slovakia	A	4	3	0	13	6

==== Bracket ====
Quarterfinals
January 2 – Grand Casino Arena
1A Sweden	**6**
4B Latvia	3
January 2 – Grand Casino Arena
2A United States	3
3B Finland (OT)	**4**
January 2 – 3M Arena
1B Canada	**7**
4A Slovakia	1
January 2 – 3M Arena
2B Czechia	**6**
3A Switzerland	2

Semifinals
January 4 – Grand Casino Arena
1 Sweden (SO)	**4**
5 Finland	3
January 4 – Grand Casino Arena
2 Canada	4
4 Czechia	**6**

Final
January 5 – Grand Casino Arena
1 Sweden	**4**
4 Czechia	2
Third place
January 5 – Grand Casino Arena
2 Canada	**6**
5 Finland	3

==== Quarterfinals ====
January 2, 2026; 1:00pm	**Sweden**	**6–3** (2–1, 2–0, 2–2)	Latvia	Grand Casino Arena, Saint Paul; Attendance: 4,946

Game reference

Love Härenstam
Goalies
Nils Mauriņš
Referees:
(Switzerland) Cedric Borgia
(United States) John Lindner
Linesmen:
(Canada) Nicholas Albinati
(United States) Allan Scott

Frondell (Wallenius) – 00:10	1–0
	1–1	13:07 – Ansons (Osmanis, Šmits) (PP)
Berglund (Pettersson, Genborg) – 16:15	2–1
Boumedienne (Freij, Stenberg) – 34:05	3–1
Carell (Eklund, Wallenius) – 35:40	4–1
Frondell (V. Björck, Freij) – 41:58	5–1
	5–2	43:50 – Flugins (Klaucāns, Vītols)
Wallenius (Eriksson, Eklund) – 55:54	6–2
	6–3	58:10 – Mūrnieks (Sieradzkis, Osmanis) (PP)

12 min
Penalties
6 min
38
Shots
16

January 2, 2026; 3:30pm	**Czechia**	**6–2** (0–1, 4–1, 2–0)	Switzerland	3M Arena at Mariucci, Minneapolis; Attendance: 3,102

Game reference

Michal Orsulák
Goalies
Christian Kirsch
Referees:
(Austria) Andreas Huber
(United States) Rocco Stachowiak
Linesmen:
(Canada) Anthony LaPointe
(Finland) Luka Makinen

	0–1	03:47 – Muggli (Ustinkov, Aeschlimann)
Galvas (Sikora) – 20:54	1–1
	1–2	26:43 – Reber (Neuenschwander, Steiner) (PP)
Drancak (Kubiesa, Klíma) – 30:28	2–2
Jiříček (Benák, Poletín) – 31:12	3–2
Sikora (Čihař, Klíma) – 35:32	4–2
Klíma (Kubiesa, Fibigr) – 50:25	5–2
Fibigr (Čihař) (PP) – 57:37	6–2

8 min
Penalties
10 min
43
Shots
20

January 2, 2026; 5:00pm	United States	**3–4 OT** (0–0, 2–1, 1–2) (OT: 0–1)	**Finland**	Grand Casino Arena, Saint Paul; Attendance: 11,779

Game reference

Nicholas Kempf
Goalies
Petteri Rimpinen
Referees:
(Canada) Troy Murray
(Sweden) Alexander Österberg
Linesmen:
(Denmark) Albert Ankerstjerne
(Canada) Luke Pye

Hutson (Bednarik, Brendan McMorrow) – 20:35	1–0
	1–1	24:46 – Ruohonen (Westergård)
Eiserman (Hutson, Hagens) (PP) – 30:15	2–1
	2–2	52:43 – Tuuva (Kiviharju, Saarelainen)
	2–3	53:38 – Saarelainen (Tuuva, Boelius)
Lee (Hagens, Zellers) (EA) – 58:27	3–3
	3–4	62:11 – Välilä (Vanhanen, Miettinen)

4 min
Penalties
6 min
31
Shots
25

January 2, 2026; 7:30pm	**Canada**	**7–1** (5–0, 2–1, 0–0)	Slovakia	3M Arena at Mariucci, Minneapolis; Attendance: 5,250

Game reference

Jack Ivankovic
Goalies
Michal Prádel
Alan Lendak
Referees:
(United States) Adam Tobias
(Finland) Janne Wuorenheimo
Linesmen:
(United States) Bryan Gorcoff
(Czech Republic) David Thuma

Reschny (Verhoeff, Beaudoin) – 13:58	1–0
Iginla (Martone) – 14:42	2–0
Misa (Parekh, MacKenzie) – 16:11	3–0
O'Reilly (Carels, Desnoyers) – 17:03	4–0
Martin (McKenna, Hage) (PP) – 19:47	5–0
Martone (Verhoeff, Misa) – 29:31	6–0
Beaudoin (O'Reilly, Parekh) – 30:41	7–0
	7–1	36:50 – Chovan (Kalman, Tomík)

12 min
Penalties
32 min
43
Shots
22

==== Semifinals ====
January 4, 2026; 3:30pm	**Sweden**	**4–3 GWS** (1–1, 2–1, 0–1) (OT: 0–0) (SO: 1–0)	Finland	Grand Casino Arena, Saint Paul; Attendance: 7,245

Game reference

Love Härenstam
Goalies
Petteri Rimpinen
Referees:
(United States) John Lindner
(Canada) Troy Murray
Linesmen:
(United States) Matthew Heinen
(Czech Republic) David Thuma

Eriksson (Frondell, Eklund) – 00:36	1–0
	1–1	16:26 – Joki (Kiviharju)
Stenberg (Berglund, Genborg) (EA) – 21:20	2–1
	2–2	22:10 – Kuhta (Pikkarainen, Jokinen)
Genborg (Stenberg) – 34:07	3–2
	3–3	54:01 – Saarelainen (Ruohonen, Valila)

V. Björck (miss)
Frondell (miss)
Stenberg (miss)
Eklund (miss)
Berglund
Frondell (miss)
Berglund (miss)
Frondell
Shootout
(miss) Tuuva
Vanhanen
(miss) Hemming
(miss) Kuhta
(miss) Miettinen
(miss) Vanhanen
(miss) Hemming
(miss) Vanhanen
10 min
Penalties
8 min
33
Shots
36

January 4, 2026; 7:30pm	Canada	**4–6** (1–1, 1–2, 2–3)	**Czechia**	Grand Casino Arena, Saint Paul; Attendance: 7,215

Game reference

Jack Ivankovic
Carter George
Goalies
Michal Oršulák
Referees:
(Sweden) Alexander Österberg
(United States) Rocco Stachowiak
Linesmen:
(Finland) Luka Makinen
(Finland) Joni Pekkala

Iginla (Misa, Luchanko) (PP) – 15:14	1–0
	1–1	16:56 – Curran (Galvas, Benák)
	1–2	23:44 – Titlbach (Pšenička, Novotný)
Parekh (Hage, O'Reilly) (PP2) – 32:38	2–2
	2–3	39:17 – Benák (Curran, Poletín)
Reschny (Hage, McKenna) – 43:59	3–3
	3–4	49:49 – Čihař (Nestrašil)
Martone (Brunicke, Aitcheson) – 57:19	4–4
	4–5	58:46 – Poletín (Curran, Benák)
	4–6	59:34 – Čihař (Sikora) (PP) (ENG)

12 min
Penalties
8 min
24
Shots
37

==== Bronze medal game ====
January 5, 2026; 3:30pm	**Canada**	**6–3** (3–2, 2–1, 1–0)	Finland	Grand Casino Arena, Saint Paul; Attendance: 7,298

Game reference

Carter George
Goalies
Petteri Rimpinen
Referees:
(United States) John Lindner
(United States) Adam Tobias
Linesmen:
(Denmark) Albert Ankerstjerne
(United States) Matthew Heinen

O'Reilly (Hage, McKenna) – 01:10	1–0
	1–1	03:23 – Valila (Ruohonen)
Cootes (Verhoeff, Greentree) – 04:57	2–1
	2–2	11:58 – Miettinen (Boelius, Kuhta) (PP)
Parekh (Hage, McKenna) (PP) – 18:41	3–2
Martone (Iginla, Parekh) – 21:47	4–2
O'Reilly (McKenna, Hage) (PP) – 25:27	5–2
	5–3	34:18 – Ruohonen (Tuuva)
McKenna (Hage) – 53:35	6–3

6 min
Penalties
8 min
34
Shots
35

==== Gold medal game ====
January 5, 2026; 7:30pm	**Sweden**	**4–2** (1–0, 1–0, 2–2)	Czechia	Grand Casino Arena, Saint Paul; Attendance: 9,753

Game reference

Love Härenstam
Goalies
Michal Oršulák
Referees:
(Canada) Troy Murray
(Finland) Janne Wuorenheimo
Linesmen:
(Canada) Anthony LaPointe
(Finland) Joni Pekkala

Juustovaara (Berglund) (SH) – 14:46	1–0
Eklund (Berglund, Stenberg) (PP) – 29:21	2–0
Boumedienne (Stenberg, V. Björck) – 43:47	3–0
	3–1	57:36 – Jiříček (Fibigr, Nestrašil) (EA)
	3–2	59:36 – Kubiesa (Fibigr, Čihař) (EA)
Stenberg (Eklund, V. Björck) (ENG) – 59:52	4–2

8 min
Penalties
4 min
35
Shots
29

=== Statistics ===
==== Scoring leaders ====
Pos	Player	Country	GP	G	A	Pts	+/−	PIM
1	Michael Hage	Canada	7	2	13	15	+7	0
2	Gavin McKenna	Canada	7	4	10	14	+7	14
3	Zayne Parekh	Canada	7	5	8	13	+5	10
4	Vojtěch Čihař	Czechia	7	4	8	12	+7	2
5	Ivar Stenberg	Sweden	7	4	6	10	+5	6
6	Jack Berglund	Sweden	7	3	7	10	+9	4
7	Porter Martone	Canada	7	6	3	9	+4	6
8	Viggo Björck	Sweden	7	3	6	9	+5	2
8	Tomáš Galvas	Czechia	7	3	6	9	+7	0
8	Heikki Ruohonen	Finland	7	3	6	9	+6	4

GP = Games played; G = Goals; A = Assists; Pts = Points; +/− = Plus–minus; PIM = Penalties In Minutes
Source 1: IIHF.com (pdf)
Source 2: IIHF.com
Source 3: eliteprospects.com

==== Goaltending leaders ====
(minimum 40% team's total ice time)

Pos	Player	Country	TOI	GA	GAA	SA	Sv%	SO
1	Jack Ivankovic	Canada	179:43	7	2.34	85	**91.76**	0
2	Love Härenstam	Sweden	370:00	15	2.43	168	**91.07**	0
3	Christian Kirsch	Switzerland	178:23	8	2.69	83	**90.36**	1
4	Elijah Neuenschwander	Switzerland	119:23	5	2.51	51	**90.20**	0
5	Nicholas Kempf	United States	140:06	6	2.57	57	**89.47**	0

TOI = Time on ice (minutes:seconds); GA = Goals against; GAA = Goals against average; SA = Shots against; Sv% = Save percentage; SO = Shutouts
Source1: IIHF.com (pdf)
Source2: IIHF.com

=== Awards ===
- Best players selected by the directorate:
  - Best Goaltender: (Sweden) Love Härenstam
  - Best Defenceman: (Czech Republic) Adam Jiříček
  - Best Forward: (Sweden) Anton Frondell
- Media All-Stars:
  - MVP: (Czech Republic) Vojtěch Čihař
  - Goaltender: (Sweden) Love Härenstam
  - Defencemen: (Canada) Zayne Parekh / (Czech Republic) Tomáš Galvas
  - Forwards: (Canada) Michael Hage / (Sweden) Anton Frondell / (Czech Republic) Vojtěch Čihař

=== Final standings ===
Pos	Grp	Team	Pld	W	OTW	OTL	L	GF	GA	GD	Pts	Final result
1	A	Sweden	7	6	1	0	0	35	16	+19	20	Champions
2	B	Czechia	7	4	1	0	2	32	22	+10	14	Runners-up
3	B	Canada	7	5	1	0	1	42	21	+21	17	Third place
4	B	Finland	7	2	1	2	2	29	24	+5	10	Fourth place
5	A	United States (H)	5	3	0	1	1	20	19	+1	10	Eliminated in quarterfinals
6	A	Switzerland	5	2	0	0	3	12	14	−2	6	Eliminated in quarterfinals
7	B	Latvia	5	1	0	1	3	12	23	−11	4	Eliminated in quarterfinals
8	A	Slovakia	5	1	0	0	4	14	20	−6	3	Eliminated in quarterfinals
9	A	Germany	5	1	0	0	4	13	26	−13	3	Avoided relegation
10	B	Denmark	5	0	0	0	5	12	36	−24	0	Relegated to the 2027 Division I A

Source: IIHF.com
(H) Host

== Division I ==
=== Group A ===
The Division I, Group A, tournament was played in Bled, Slovenia, between December 7 and 13, 2025.

Pos	Team	Pld	W	OTW	OTL	L	GF	GA	GD	Pts	Promotion or relegation
1	Norway	5	4	1	0	0	37	11	+26	14	Promotion to the 2027 Top Division
2	Kazakhstan	5	2	1	1	1	27	26	+1	9 (Note: Head-to-head points: Kazakhstan 3, Austria 0)	
3	Austria	5	3	0	0	2	25	18	+7	9	
4	Slovenia (H)	5	1	1	1	2	17	26	−9	6 (Note: Head-to-head points: Slovenia 3, Ukraine 0)	
5	Ukraine	5	1	1	1	2	12	19	−7	6	
6	France	5	0	0	1	4	16	34	−18	1	Relegation to the 2027 Division I B

Source: IIHF
Rules for classification: 1) points; 2) head-to-head points; 3) head-to-head goal difference; 4) head-to-head number of goals scored; 5) result against closest best-ranked team outside tied teams; 6) result against next best-ranked team outside tied teams; 7) seeding before tournament.
(H) Host

=== Group B ===
The Division I, Group B, tournament was played in Milan, Italy, between December 8 and 14, 2025.

Pos	Team	Pld	W	OTW	OTL	L	GF	GA	GD	Pts	Promotion or relegation
1	Hungary	5	3	1	0	1	18	9	+9	11	Promotion to the 2027 Division I A
2	Estonia	5	2	1	1	1	18	14	+4	9 (Note: Head-to-head points: Estonia 3, Lithuania 0)	
3	Lithuania	5	3	0	0	2	10	11	−1	9	
4	Poland	5	2	0	2	1	13	13	0	8	
5	Japan	5	1	1	0	3	12	16	−4	5	
6	Italy (H)	5	1	0	0	4	11	19	−8	3	Relegation to the 2027 Division II A

Source: IIHF
Rules for classification: 1) points; 2) head-to-head points; 3) head-to-head goal difference; 4) head-to-head number of goals scored; 5) result against closest best-ranked team outside tied teams; 6) result against next best-ranked team outside tied teams; 7) seeding before tournament.
(H) Host

== Division II ==
=== Group A ===
The Division II, Group A, tournament was played in Bucharest, Romania, between January 4 and 10, 2026.

Pos	Team	Pld	W	OTW	OTL	L	GF	GA	GD	Pts	Promotion or relegation
1	South Korea	5	5	0	0	0	33	6	+27	15	Promotion to the 2027 Division I B
2	Great Britain	5	3	1	0	1	15	13	+2	11	
3	Croatia	5	2	1	0	2	18	27	−9	8	
4	Romania (H)	5	1	1	1	2	16	19	−3	6	
5	China	5	1	0	2	2	15	18	−3	5	
6	Spain	5	0	0	0	5	11	25	−14	0	Relegation to the 2027 Division II B

Source: IIHF
Rules for classification: 1) points; 2) head-to-head points; 3) head-to-head goal difference; 4) head-to-head number of goals scored; 5) result against closest best-ranked team outside tied teams; 6) result against next best-ranked team outside tied teams; 7) seeding before tournament.
(H) Host

=== Group B ===
The Division II, Group B, tournament was played in Belgrade, Serbia, between January 18 and 24, 2026.

Pos	Team	Pld	W	OTW	OTL	L	GF	GA	GD	Pts	Promotion or relegation
1	Netherlands	5	5	0	0	0	40	3	+37	15	Promotion to the 2027 Division II A
2	Australia	5	3	0	0	2	29	21	+8	9	
3	Israel	5	2	1	0	2	20	18	+2	8	
4	Serbia (H)	5	2	0	1	2	14	19	−5	7	
5	New Zealand	5	1	0	0	4	11	44	−33	3 (Note: Head-to-head points: New Zealand 3, Iceland 0)	
6	Iceland	5	1	0	0	4	15	24	−9	3	Relegation to the 2027 Division III A

Source: IIHF
Rules for classification: 1) points; 2) head-to-head points; 3) head-to-head goal difference; 4) head-to-head number of goals scored; 5) result against closest best-ranked team outside tied teams; 6) result against next best-ranked team outside tied teams; 7) seeding before tournament.
(H) Host

== Division III ==
=== Group A ===
The Division III, Group A, tournament was played in Sofia, Bulgaria, between January 19 and 25, 2026.

Pos	Team	Pld	W	OTW	OTL	L	GF	GA	GD	Pts	Promotion or relegation
1	Chinese Taipei	5	4	1	0	0	42	14	+28	14	Promotion to the 2027 Division II B
2	Bulgaria (H)	5	3	1	0	1	29	13	+16	11	
3	Belgium	5	2	0	3	0	27	16	+11	9	
4	Turkey	5	2	1	0	2	34	15	+19	8	
5	Thailand	5	1	0	0	4	11	35	−24	3	
6	Bosnia and Herzegovina	5	0	0	0	5	6	56	−50	0	Relegation to the 2027 Division III B

Source: IIHF
Rules for classification: 1) points; 2) head-to-head points; 3) head-to-head goal difference; 4) head-to-head number of goals scored; 5) result against closest best-ranked team outside tied teams; 6) result against next best-ranked team outside tied teams; 7) seeding before tournament.
(H) Host

=== Group B ===
The Division III, Group B, tournament was played in Bishkek, Kyrgyzstan, between January 18 and 24, 2026.

Pos	Team	Pld	W	OTW	OTL	L	GF	GA	GD	Pts	Promotion
1	Kyrgyzstan (H)	5	5	0	0	0	38	10	+28	15	Promotion to the 2027 Division III A
2	Hong Kong	5	4	0	0	1	31	11	+20	12	
3	Mexico	5	3	0	0	2	18	15	+3	9	
4	Luxembourg	5	2	0	0	3	21	15	+6	6	
5	South Africa	5	1	0	0	4	9	25	−16	3	
6	Iran	5	0	0	0	5	6	47	−41	0	

Source: IIHF
Rules for classification: 1) points; 2) head-to-head points; 3) head-to-head goal difference; 4) head-to-head number of goals scored; 5) result against closest best-ranked team outside tied teams; 6) result against next best-ranked team outside tied teams; 7) seeding before tournament.
(H) Host
