= Jiří Patera =

Jiří Patera may refer to:

- Jiří Patera (mathematician) (1936–2022), Czech-born Canadian mathematician and academic
- Jiří Patera (ice hockey) (born 1999), Czech professional ice hockey goaltender
