= Jack Berglund =

Swedish ice hockey player

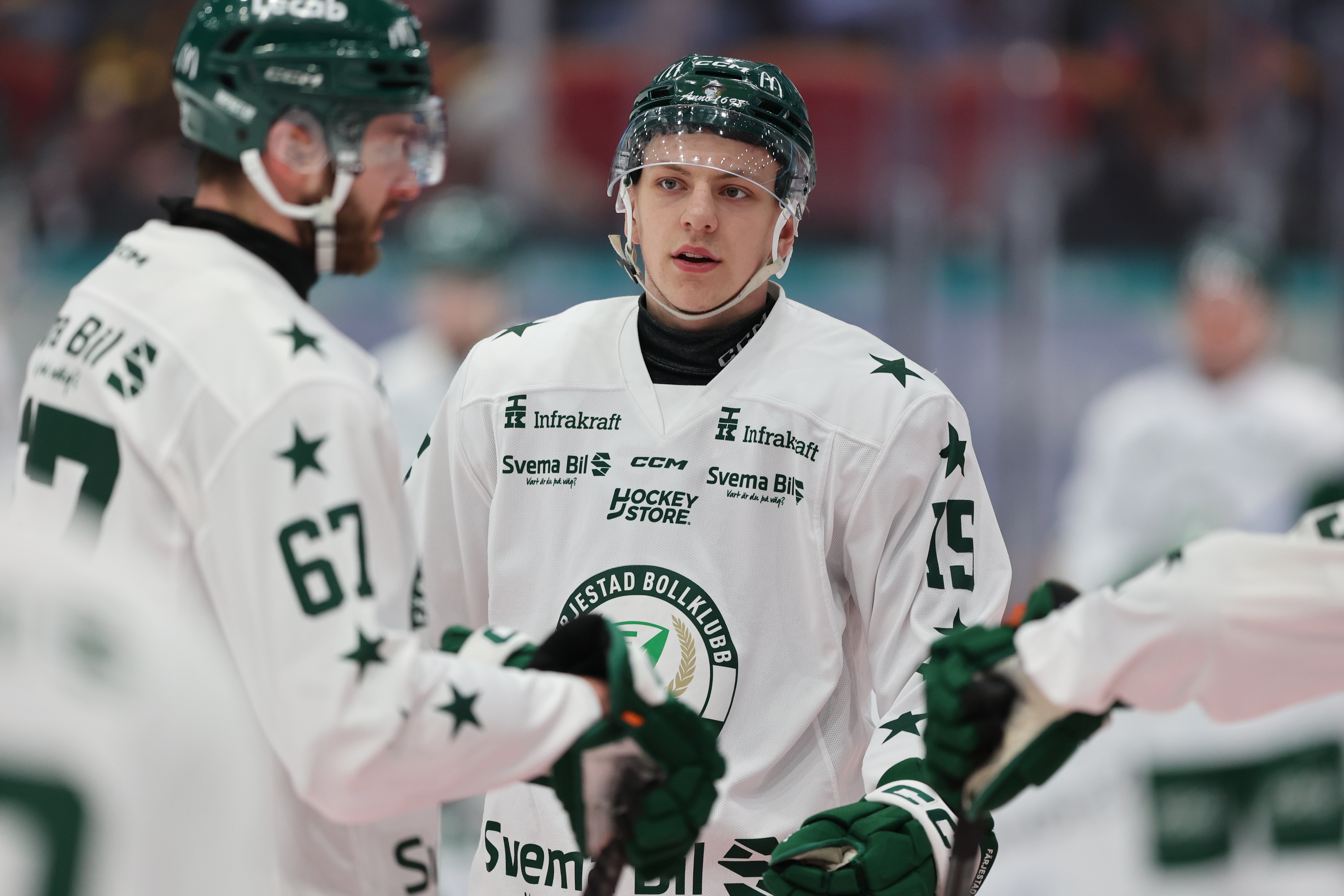
- Berglund (#15) with Färjestad BK in 2026
- Born: 10 April 2006 (age 20) Karlstad, Sweden
- Height: 6 ft 3 in (191 cm)
- Weight: 209 lb (95 kg; 14 st 13 lb)
- Position: Centre
- Shoots: Left
- NHL team (P) Cur. team: Philadelphia Flyers; Färjestad BK (SHL)
- National team: Sweden
- NHL draft: 51st overall, 2024; Philadelphia Flyers
- Playing career: 2024–present

Jack Berglund (born 10 April 2006) is a Swedish professional ice hockey player who is a centre for Färjestad BK of the Swedish Hockey League (SHL). Berglund was drafted in the second round, 51st overall, by the Philadelphia Flyers in the 2024 NHL entry draft.

== Playing career ==
Berglund signed a three-year entry-level contract with the Flyers on 9 April 2026. He was loaned by the Flyers to Färjestad BK for the duration of the 2026–27 season.

== Personal life ==
Jack is the son of former New Jersey Devil and Florida Panther Christian Berglund who played in 371 Elitserien games and 86 NHL games.

== International play ==
Medal record

Men's ice hockey

Representing Sweden

World Junior Championships
Gold medal – first place	2026 United States	

In December 2025, he was selected to represent Sweden at the 2026 World Junior Ice Hockey Championships. He recorded three goals and seven assists in seven games and won a gold medal. This was Sweden's first gold medal at the IIHF World Junior Championship since 2012.

== Career statistics ==
=== Regular season and playoffs ===
			Regular season					Playoffs
Season	Team	League	GP	G	A	Pts	PIM	GP	G	A	Pts	PIM
2022–23	Färjestad BK	J20	1	0	1	1	0	—	—	—	—	—
2023–24	Färjestad BK	J20	41	15	19	34	20	2	1	0	1	0
2023–24	Färjestad BK	SHL	8	1	0	1	0	—	—	—	—	—
2024–25	Färjestad BK	J20	15	8	14	22	12	—	—	—	—	—
2024–25	Färjestad BK	SHL	17	1	2	3	0	—	—	—	—	—
2024–25	BIK Karlskoga	Allsv	4	0	0	0	25	10	2	3	5	9
2025–26	Färjestad BK	J20	2	0	3	3	2	—	—	—	—	—
2025–26	Färjestad BK	SHL	40	7	5	12	26	7	0	3	3	2
SHL totals			65	9	7	16	26	7	0	3	3	2

=== International ===
Year	Team	Event	Result	GP	G	A	Pts	PIM
2023	Sweden	WJAC-19	4th	6	2	2	4	6
2024	Sweden	U18	3rd place, bronze medalist(s)	7	2	3	5	0
2026	Sweden	WJC	1st place, gold medalist(s)	7	3	7	10	4
2026	Sweden	WC	7th	8	0	4	4	6
Junior totals				20	7	12	19	10
Senior totals				8	0	4	4	6
