= Victor Eklund =

Swedish ice hockey player (born 2006)

- Born: 3 October 2006 (age 20) Stockholm, Sweden
- Height: 5 ft 11 in (180 cm)
- Weight: 161 lb (73 kg; 11 st 7 lb)
- Position: Right wing
- Shoots: Right
- NHL team Former teams: New York Islanders; Djurgårdens IF
- NHL draft: 16th overall, 2025; New York Islanders
- Playing career: 2024–present

Victor Eklund (born 3 October 2006) is a Swedish ice hockey player who is a right winger for the New York Islanders of the National Hockey League (NHL). He was drafted 16th overall by New York Islanders in the 2025 NHL entry draft.

== Playing career ==
During the 2023–24 season, Eklund split time between Djurgårdens IF and its under-20 team and in the J20 Nationell. He recorded seven goals and 18 assists in 30 games in the junior league, before being promoted. He then recorded one goal and three assists in 15 games in the HockeyAllsvenskan.

On 27 June 2025, Eklund was selected 16th overall by the New York Islanders in the 2025 NHL entry draft. He signed a three-year, entry-level contract with the Islanders on 14 July. After playing the 2025–26 season for Djurgårdens IF of the SHL and then the Islanders' AHL affiliate Bridgeport Islanders, Eklund was called up to the Islanders for their final game of the season against the Carolina Hurricanes on 14 April 2026 and recorded an assist on a goal by Bo Horvat.

On 3 October 2026, his 20th birthday, Eklund registered his first career NHL goal in a 6–0 win over the New Jersey Devils.

== International play ==
Medal record

Men's ice hockey

Representing Sweden

World Junior Championships
Gold medal – first place	2026 United States	

World U18 Championships
Bronze medal – third place	2024 Finland	

Eklund represented Sweden at the 2024 World U18 Championships where he recorded four goals and two assists in seven games and won a bronze medal.

In December 2024, he was selected to represent Sweden at the 2025 World Junior Championships. During the tournament he recorded two goals and four assists in seven games. In December 2025, he was again selected to represent Sweden at the 2026 World Junior Championships. He recorded two goals and six assists in seven games and won a gold medal. This was Sweden's first gold medal at the World Junior Championship since 2012.

== Personal life ==
Eklund is the son of former professional ice hockey player Christian Eklund, who played several seasons for Djurgårdens IF. He represents the third member of his immediate family to play professionally for the club, alongside his father and his brother, William Eklund, who also began his senior career with Djurgårdens IF.

== Career statistics ==
=== Regular season and playoffs ===
			Regular season					Playoffs
Season	Team	League	GP	G	A	Pts	PIM	GP	G	A	Pts	PIM
2021–22	Djurgårdens IF	J18	16	3	6	9	8	5	0	4	4	2
2022–23	Djurgårdens IF	J18	14	13	12	25	16	6	3	5	8	6
2022–23	Djurgårdens IF	J20	7	0	2	2	2	—	—	—	—	—
2023–24	Djurgårdens IF	J18	1	2	2	4	0	—	—	—	—	—
2023–24	Djurgårdens IF	J20	30	7	18	25	26	—	—	—	—	—
2023–24	Djurgårdens IF	Allsv	15	1	3	4	6	15	2	4	6	6
2024–25	Djurgårdens IF	J20	1	0	0	0	0	—	—	—	—	—
2024–25	Djurgårdens IF	Allsv	42	19	12	31	37	16	2	5	7	8
2025–26	Djurgårdens IF	SHL	43	6	18	24	22	3	0	3	3	4
2025–26	Bridgeport Islanders	AHL	9	3	7	10	2	2	0	0	0	0
2025–26	New York Islanders	NHL	1	0	1	1	0	—	—	—	—	—
SHL totals			43	6	18	24	22	3	0	3	3	4
NHL totals			1	0	1	1	0	—	—	—	—	—

=== International ===
Year	Team	Event	Result	GP	G	A	Pts	PIM
2024	Sweden	U18	3rd place, bronze medalist(s)	7	4	2	6	2
2025	Sweden	WJC	4th	7	2	4	6	2
2026	Sweden	WJC	1st place, gold medalist(s)	7	2	6	8	4
Junior totals				21	8	12	20	8

Awards and achievements
Preceded by Matthew Schaefer	New York Islanders first round pick 2025	Succeeded by Kashawn Aitcheson
