= 2024–25 USHL season =

46th season of the USHL

- League: United States Hockey League
- Sport: Ice hockey
- Duration: Regular season September 18, 2024 – April 12, 2025; Postseason; April – May
- Games: 62
- Teams: 16

Draft
- Top draft pick: Heikki Ruohonen
- Picked by: Dubuque Fighting Saints

Regular season
- Anderson Cup: Lincoln Stars
- Season MVP: Will Zellers (Green Bay Gamblers)
- Top scorer: Giacomo Martino (Sioux City Musketeers)

Clark Cup Playoffs
- Clark Cup Playoffs MVP: Tynan Lawrence (Lumberjacks)
- Finals champions: Muskegon Lumberjacks
- Runners-up: Waterloo Black Hawks

USHL seasons
- ← 2023–24 2025–26 →

The 2024–25 USHL season was the 46th season of the United States Hockey League as an all-junior league. The regular season ran from September 2024 to April 2025 with a 62-game schedule for each team. All 16 teams played their first two games of the season in Cranberry Township, Pennsylvania as part of the 8th DICK'S Sporting Goods Fall Classic hosted by the Pittsburgh Penguins.

== League changes ==
The league expanded its video review policy to allow coaches to challenge calls, or the lack thereof, related to possible goaltender interference, in-game stoppage, and unobserved major penalties. The league will pilot an initiative to review all game misconduct penalties.

== Regular season ==
The standings at the end of the regular season were as follows:

Note: x = clinched playoff berth; y = clinched conference title; z = clinched regular season title

=== Eastern Conference ===
Team	GP	W	L	OTL	SOL	Pts	GF	GA
y – Youngstown Phantoms	62	42	18	0	2	86	232	167
x – Dubuque Fighting Saints	62	41	18	1	2	85	226	186
x – Madison Capitols	62	39	17	5	1	84	250	185
x – Muskegon Lumberjacks	62	38	16	4	4	84	215	174
x – Cedar Rapids RoughRiders	62	27	30	2	3	59	178	187
x – Green Bay Gamblers	62	27	31	2	2	58	202	242
Team USA	62	23	35	2	2	50	202	295
Chicago Steel	62	20	36	5	1	46	187	251

=== Western Conference ===
Team	GP	W	L	OTL	SOL	Pts	GF	GA
z – Lincoln Stars	62	44	15	3	0	91	272	166
x – Sioux Falls Stampede	62	40	17	3	2	85	247	190
x – Waterloo Black Hawks	62	34	18	6	4	78	212	176
x – Sioux City Musketeers	62	31	23	3	5	70	221	202
x – Fargo Force	62	29	27	4	2	64	190	207
x – Tri-City Storm	62	29	29	3	1	62	199	225
Des Moines Buccaneers	62	25	32	5	0	55	181	223
Omaha Lancers	62	7	48	6	1	21	116	254

=== Scoring leaders ===
The following players led the league in regular season points at the completion of games played on April 12, 2025.

Player	Team	GP	G	A	Pts	PIM
Giacomo Martino	Sioux City Musketeers	62	32	42	74	14
Landen Gunderson	Sioux City Musketeers	62	28	45	73	51
Will Zellers	Green Bay Gamblers	52	44	27	71	59
Ryker Lee	Madison Capitols	58	31	37	68	18
Aidan Park	Green Bay Gamblers	55	33	33	66	49
Jack Pechar	Lincoln Stars	56	27	34	61	12
Nolan Roed	Tri-City Storm	61	27	33	60	26
Aiden Long	Madison Capitols	62	22	37	59	59
Adam Benák	Youngstown Phantoms	56	17	42	59	36
Jamison Sluys	Omaha/Youngstown	63	16	42	58	34

=== Leading goaltenders ===
Note: GP = Games played; Mins = Minutes played; W = Wins; L = Losses; OTL = Overtime losses; SOL = Shootout losses; SO = Shutouts; GAA = Goals against average; SV% = Save percentage

Player	Team	GP	Mins	W	L	OTL	SOL	SO	GAA	SV%
Yan Shostak	Lincoln Stars	43	2421	29	12	1	0	3	2.40	0.911
Melvin Strahl	Youngstown Phantoms	48	2704	33	12	0	1	4	2.42	0.903
Stephen Peck	Muskegon Lumberjacks	31	1755	19	6	2	3	1	2.43	0.909
Aiden Wright	Sioux Falls Stampede	33	1813	21	8	3	0	0	2.58	0.905
Calvin Vachon	Waterloo Black Hawks	38	1811	16	9	3	2	1	2.62	0.896

== Clark Cup playoffs ==
First Round (Best-of-3)
E4	Muskegon	2
E5	Cedar Rapids	1
E3	Madison	2
E6	Green Bay	0
W4	Sioux City	2
W5	Fargo	0
W3	Waterloo	2
W6	Tri-City	0

Conference Semifinals (Best-of-5)
E1	Youngstown	0
E4	Muskegon	3
Eastern Conference
E2	Dubuque	3
E3	Madison	1
W1	Lincoln	3
W4	Sioux City	0
Western Conference
W2	Sioux Falls	1
W3	Waterloo	3

Conference Finals (Best-of-5)
E2	Dubuque	0
E4	Muskegon	3
W1	Lincoln	1
W3	Waterloo	3

Clark Cup Championship (Best-of-5)
W3	Waterloo	2
E4	Muskegon	3

== First Round ==
=== Eastern Conference ===
==== (E4) Muskegon Lumberjacks vs. (E5) Cedar Rapids RoughRiders ====
April 14	Muskegon Lumberjacks	2 – 1	Cedar Rapids RoughRiders	Trinity Health Arena
15:14 - Jack Galanek (1)		First period	No scoring
No scoring		Second period	No scoring
18:52 - Václav Nestrašil (1)		Third period	Amine Hajibi (1) - 4:56
Stephen Peck (31 saves / 32 shots)		Goalie stats	A.J. Reyelts (26 saves / 28 shots)

April 15	Muskegon Lumberjacks	3 – 4	Cedar Rapids RoughRiders	Trinity Health Arena
No scoring		First period	John McNelis (1) - pp - 7:31
15:50 - pp - Tynan Lawrence (1); 17:16 - Chase Stefanek (1)		Second period	No scoring
1:08 - Tynan Lawrence (2)		Third period	Grant Young (1) - 3:33; Kole Hyles (1) - 11:30; Heath Nelson (1) - 19:01
Stephen Peck (22 saves / 26 shots)		Goalie stats	A.J. Reyelts (15 saves / 18 shots)

April 16	Muskegon Lumberjacks	4 – 1	Cedar Rapids RoughRiders	Trinity Health Arena
Teddy Spitznagel (1) - 2:09; David Deputy (1) - 4:58; David Klee (1) - pp - 15:13; Xavier Veilleux (1) - pp - 16:05		First period	No scoring
No scoring		Second period	16:23 - pp - Grant Young (2)
No scoring		Third period	No scoring
Shikhabutdin Gadzhiev (30 saves / 31 shots)		Goalie stats	A.J. Reyelts (30 saves / 34 shots)

Muskegon wins series 2 – 1

==== (E4) Madison Capitols vs. (E5) Green Bay Gamblers ====
April 14	Madison Capitols	4 – 3	Green Bay Gamblers	Bob Suter's Capitol Ice Arena
15:21 - Ian Scherzer (1)		First period	Niles Benson (1) - 4:10; Aidan Park (1) - 10:09
8:02 - Sam Kappell (1); 14:41 - Mason Moe (1)		Second period	Aidan Park (2) - 10:09
4:57 - Mason Moe (2)		Third period	No scoring
Caleb Heil (20 saves / 23 shots)		Goalie stats	Gavin Moffatt (31 saves / 35 shots)

April 15	Madison Capitols	5 – 3	Green Bay Gamblers	Bob Suter's Capitol Ice Arena
7:02 - Ryker Lee (1); 8:19 - Egor Barabanov (1); 18:04 - pp - Mason Moe (3)		First period	No scoring
12:19 - Sam Kappell (2)		Second period	Will Zellers (1) - 15:23
19:10 - en - Gavin Uhlenkamp (1)		Third period	Anthony Cardilli (1) - 6:17; Egor Shilov (1) - pp - 13:10
Caleb Heil (31 saves / 34 shots)		Goalie stats	Gavin Moffatt (16 saves / 20 shots)

Madison wins series 2 – 0

=== Western Conference ===
==== (W4) Sioux City Musketeers vs. (W5) Fargo Force ====
April 15	Sioux City Musketeers	7 – 0	Fargo Force	Tyson Events Center
7:51 - pp - Drake Murray (1); 9:19 - Trey Jefferis (1); 10:54 - Liam Hupka (1); 15:34 - sh - Drake Murray (2)		First period	No scoring
9:50 - Nikita Klepov (1)		Second period	No scoring
2:47 - Liam Hupka (2); 7:06 - Justin Stupka (1)		Third period	No scoring
Samuel Urban (14 saves / 14 shots)		Goalie stats	Alan Lendak (4 saves / 7 shots); Dane Callaway (16 saves / 20 shots)

April 16	Sioux City Musketeers	5 – 2	Fargo Force	Tyson Events Center
No scoring		First period	No scoring
1:58 - pp - Landen Gunderson (1); 8:56 - Giacomo Martino (1)		Second period	Kuzma Voronin (1) - pp - 18:27
8:05 - Tate Pritchard (1); 12:13 - Drake Murray (3); 18:03 - en - Tate Pritchard (2)		Third period	Matthew Lansing (1) - pp - 4:06
Samuel Urban (22 saves / 24 shots)		Goalie stats	Alan Lendak (12 saves / 16 shots)

Sioux City wins series 2 – 0

==== (W3) Waterloo Black Hawks vs. (W6) Tri-City Storm ====
April 14	Waterloo Black Hawks	2 – 1	Tri-City Storm	Young Arena
No scoring		First period	Carmelo Crandell (1) - 17:05
13:27 - Bradley Walker (1)		Second period	No scoring
13:57 - Brendan McMorrow (1)		Third period	No scoring
Carter Casey (23 saves / 24 shots)		Goalie stats	Michal Pradel (34 saves / 36 shots)

April 15	Waterloo Black Hawks	7 – 3	Tri-City Storm	Young Arena
1:55 - Kaeden Hawkins (1); 4:36 - Brendan McMorrow (2)		First period	Artemi Nizameyev (1) - 3:36; Shaun McEwen (1) - 12:52
4:18 - pp - Easton Hewson (1); 16:43 - pp - Chase Jette (1)		Second period	Dylan Nolan (1) - 19:24
10:22 - Teddy Townsend (1); 14:20 - pp - Kaeden Hawkins (2); 17:07 - en - Teddy Mallgrave (1)		Third period	No scoring
Carter Casey (20 saves / 23 shots)		Goalie stats	Kyle Jones (33 saves / 39 shots)

Waterloo wins series 2 – 0

== Conference Semifinals ==
=== Eastern Conference ===
==== (E1) Youngstown Phantoms vs. (E4) Muskegon Lumberjacks ====
April 19	Youngstown Phantoms	3 – 5	Muskegon Lumberjacks	Covelli Centre
No scoring		First period	Ivan Ryabkin (1) - 1:37; David Deputy (2) - 5:41
No scoring		Second period	Ivan Ryabkin (2) - 0:23; Teddy Spitznagel (2) - pp - 3:59; Jack Christ (1) - 4:25
4:51 - Ryan Rucinski (1); 11:55 - Ryan Rucinski (2); 13:18 - Conner de Haro (1)		Third period	No scoring
Melvin Strahl (7 saves / 12 shots); Owen Lepak (11 saves / 11 shots)		Goalie stats	Shikhabutdin Gadzhiev (32 saves / 35 shots)

April 20	Youngstown Phantoms	2 – 6	Muskegon Lumberjacks	Covelli Centre
5:18 -Brecken Smith (1)		First period	David Deputy (3) - pp - 7:32; Tynan Lawrence (3) - pp - 16:00
10:45 - Luke Osburn (1)		Second period	David Deputy (4) - 1:57; Jack Galanek (2) - pp - 19:12
No scoring		Third period	Jack Christ (2) - 9:20; Tynan Lawrence (4) - en - 16:04
Melvin Strahl (17 saves / 22 shots)		Goalie stats	Stephen Peck (28 saves / 30 shots)

April 22	Muskegon Lumberjacks	5 – 3	Youngstown Phantoms	Trinity Health Arena
0:23 - David Deputy (5); 7:38 - Chase Stefanek (2)		First period	Ryan Rucinski (3) - pp - 14:16
13:13 - pp - David Deputy (6); 18:16 - Ivan Ryabkin (3)		Second period	No scoring
19:15 - en - Tynan Lawrence (5)		Third period	Kazimier Sobieski (1) - 16:36; Michael Mesic (1) - en - 18:17
Shikhabutdin Gadzhiev (30 saves / 32 shots)		Goalie stats	Owen Lepak (12 saves / 16 shots)

Muskegon wins series 3 – 0

==== (E2) Dubuque Fighting Saints vs. (E3) Madison Capitols ====
April 18	Dubuque Fighting Saints	0 – 3	Madison Capitols	Mystique Ice Center
No scoring		First period	No scoring
No scoring		Second period	No scoring
No scoring		Third period	Finn Brink (1) - 1:48; Mason Moe (4) - en - 19:19; Sam Kappell (3) - en - 19:47
Liam Beerman (27 saves / 28 shots)		Goalie stats	Caleb Heil (23 saves / 23 shots)

April 19	Dubuque Fighting Saints	6 – 1	Madison Capitols	Mystique Ice Center
14:51 - ps - Michael Barron (1)		First period	Ryker Lee (2) - 1:13
1:37 - pp - Cole Spicer (1); 3:43 - pp - Lucas Van Vliet (1); 10:30 - pp - Josh Giuliani (1); 12:00 - Gavin Cornforth (1)		Second period	No scoring
7:33 - pp - Matthew Desiderio (1)		Third period	No scoring
Liam Beerman (19 saves / 20 shots)		Goalie stats	Caleb Heil (14 saves / 19 shots); Ajay White (7 saves / 8 shots)

April 21	Madison Capitols	2 – 4	Dubuque Fighting Saints	Bob Suter's Capitol Ice Arena
7:59 - Gavin Uhlenkamp (2)		First period	No scoring
4:31 - Ryker Lee (3)		Second period	Colin Frank (1) - 3:13; Jonathan Morello (1) - pp - 8:09
No scoring		Third period	Cooper Dennis (1) - 8:07; Heikki Ruohonen (1) - en - 19:34
Caleb Heil (23 saves / 26 shots)		Goalie stats	Liam Beerman (23 saves / 25 shots)

April 22	Madison Capitols	1 – 6	Dubuque Fighting Saints	Bob Suter's Capitol Ice Arena
No scoring		First period	No scoring
9:50 - Mason Moe (5)		Second period	Michael Barron (2) - 1:47; Colin Frank (2) - 2:25; Matthew Desiderio (2) - pp - 6:39; Cole Spicer (2) - 14:47
No scoring		Third period	Lucas Van Vliet (2) - 12:04; Melvin Ekman (1) - en - 19:52
Caleb Heil (24 saves / 29 shots)		Goalie stats	Liam Beerman (29 saves / 30 shots)

Dubuque wins series 3 – 1

=== Western Conference ===
==== (W1) Lincoln Stars vs. (W4) Sioux City Musketeers ====
April 18	Lincoln Stars	3 – 2	Sioux City Musketeers	Ice Box
7:28 - Bruno Idžan (1)		First period	No scoring
No scoring		Second period	Giacomo Martino (2) - pp - 17:06; Nicholas Sykora (1) - pp - 19:17
5:27 - pp - Daniel Shlaine (1); 6:55 - Aiden Janz (1)		Third period	No scoring
Yan Shostak (19 saves / 21 shots)		Goalie stats	Samuel Urban (19 saves / 22 shots)

April 19	Lincoln Stars	6 – 3	Sioux City Musketeers	Ice Box
11:33 - Bruno Idžan (2)		First period	No scoring
4:29 - Layne Loomer (1); 16:09 - Hunter Anderson (1)		Second period	Kason Muscutt (1) - 7:47; Giacomo Martino (3) - 8:53; Luke Garry (1) - 11:05
8:05 - Alex Pelletier (1); 17:22 - en - Dashel Oliver (1); 17:57 - en - Bruno Idžan (3)		Third period	No scoring
Yan Shostak (21 saves / 24 shots)		Goalie stats	Samuel Urban (33 saves / 37 shots)

April 21	Sioux City Musketeers	0 – 2	Lincoln Stars	Tyson Events Center
No scoring		First period	Matt Maltais (1) - 18:50
No scoring		Second period	No scoring
No scoring		Third period	Layne Loomer (2) - en - 19:35
Samuel Urban (30 saves / 31 shots)		Goalie stats	Yan Shostak (17 saves / 17 shots)

Lincoln wins series 3 – 0

==== (W2) Sioux Falls Stampede vs. (W3) Waterloo Black Hawks ====
April 18	Sioux Falls Stampede	2 – 4	Waterloo Black Hawks	Denny Sanford PREMIER Center
No scoring		First period	No scoring
6:05 - pp - Sam Spehar (1); 16:32 - pp - Gennadi Chaly (1)		Second period	Reid Daavettila (1) - 9:35
No scoring		Third period	Brendan McMorrow (3) - 0:39; Grady Deering (1) - 4:48; Brendan McMorrow (4) - pp - 11:06
Waylon Esche (18 saves / 22 shots)		Goalie stats	Carter Casey (32 saves / 34 shots)

April 19	Sioux Falls Stampede	5 – 2	Waterloo Black Hawks	Denny Sanford PREMIER Center
6:16 - Javon Moore (1); 17:12 - pp - Noah Urness (1)		First period	No scoring
No scoring		Second period	No scoring
3:07 - Sam Spehar (2); 18:52 - en - Brock James (1); 19:22 - en - Joseph McGraw (1)		Third period	Chase Jette (2) - pp - 4:24; Teddy Mallgrave (2) - 9:04
Waylon Esche (32 saves / 34 shots)		Goalie stats	Carter Casey (33 saves / 36 shots)

April 21	Waterloo Black Hawks	6 – 2	Sioux Falls Stampede	Young Arena
16:50 - pp - Kaeden Hawkins (3)		First period	No scoring
6:30 - pp - Brock Schultz (1); 15:23 - Hunter Ramos (1); 19:18 - Morgan Brady (1)		Second period	No scoring
0:58 - Teddy Townsend (2); 16:45 - sh - en - Bradley Walker (2)		Third period	Ethan Wyttenbach (1) - 13:43; Ben Wilmott (1) - 19:46
Carter Casey (30 saves / 32 shots)		Goalie stats	Aiden Wright (34 saves / 39 shots)

April 22	Waterloo Black Hawks	6 – 5	2OT	Sioux Falls Stampede	Young Arena
No scoring		First period		Joseph McGraw (2) - 12:40; Bryce Ingles (1) - 19:41
2:54 - Dylan Compton (1); 13:42 - pp - Kaeden Hawkins (4)		Second period		Joseph McGraw (3) - 7:34; Joseph McGraw (4) - 18:43
9:13 - Chase Jette (3); 13:01 - Reid Morich (1); 19:01 - Reid Morich (2)		Third period		J.J. Monteiro (1) - 14:39
2:32 - Brendan McMorrow (5)		Second overtime period		No scoring
Carter Casey (44 saves / 49 shots)		Goalie stats		Aiden Wright (38 saves / 44 shots)

Waterloo wins series 3 – 1

== Conference Finals ==
=== Eastern Conference ===
==== (E2) Dubuque Fighting Saints vs. (E4) Muskegon Lumberjacks ====
April 25	Dubuque Fighting Saints	1 – 2	Muskegon Lumberjacks	Mystique Ice Center
No scoring		First period	Václav Nestrašil (2) - 19:26
No scoring		Second period	Chase Stefanek (3) - 6:20
8:04 - Josh Giuliani (2)		Third period	No scoring
Liam Beerman (30 saves / 32 shots)		Goalie stats	Shikhabutdin Gadzhiev (36 saves / 37 shots)

April 26	Dubuque Fighting Saints	4 – 7	Muskegon Lumberjacks	Mystique Ice Center
8:51 - pp - Josh Giuliani (3)		First period	Ivan Ryabkin (4) - pp - 11:37; Ivan Ryabkin (5) - pp - 12:44; Jack Galanek (3) - 17:38
		Second period	Xavier Veilleux (2) - 1:54; David Deputy (7) - 3:42; David Deputy (8) - 15:57
2:17 - Lucas Van Vliet (3); 8:18 - Jonathan Morello (2); 9:33 - James Mackey (1)		Third period	Ivan Ryabkin (6) - en - 19:22
Liam Beerman (13 saves / 19 shots); Kyle Ozgun (5 saves / 5 shots)		Goalie stats	Stephen Peck (14 saves / 18 shots); Shikhabutdin Gadzhiev (5 saves / 5 shots)

April 29	Muskegon Lumberjacks	3 – 1	Dubuque Fighting Saints	Trinity Health Arena
8:06 - Václav Nestrašil (3)		First period	No scoring
13:57 - Matthew Van Blaricom (1)		Second period	Lucas Van Vliet (4) - pp - 1:11
19:52 - en - Tynan Lawrence (6)		Third period	No scoring
Shikhabutdin Gadzhiev (30 saves / 31 shots)		Goalie stats	Liam Beerman (29 saves / 31 shots)

Muskegon wins series 3 – 0

=== Western Conference ===
==== (W1) Lincoln Stars vs. (W3) Waterloo Black Hawks ====
April 25	Lincoln Stars	4 – 6	Waterloo Black Hawks	Ice Box
3:17 - Kade Kohanski (1)		First period	Teddy Townsend (3) - 13:28
13:31 - Hunter Anderson (2)		Second period	Chase Jette (4) - 0:48; Hunter Ramos (2) - 1:15; Kaeden Hawkins (5) - 2:31; Reid Morich (3) - 17:35
10:19 - Alex Pelletier (2); 19:25 - Lefty Markonidis (1)		Third period	Brady Peddle (1) - 6:54
Yan Shostak (6 saves / 10 shots); William Prowse (11 saves / 13 shots)		Goalie stats	Carter Casey (29 saves / 33 shots)

April 26	Lincoln Stars	4 – 3	Waterloo Black Hawks	Ice Box
2:00 - Matt Maltais (2); 3:27 - Lefty Markonidis (2); 12:55 - Ethan Weber (1)		First period	No scoring
5:17 - Alex Pelletier (3)		Second period	Hunter Ramos (3) - 6:10
No scoring		Third period	Kaeden Hawkins (6) - 17:53; Brendan McMorrow (6) - 19:39
Yan Shostak (28 saves / 31 shots)		Goalie stats	Carter Casey (29 saves / 33 shots)

April 30	Waterloo Black Hawks	5 – 0	Lincoln Stars	Young Arena
4:54 - Teddy Townsend (3)		First period	No scoring
0:33 - Teddy Townsend (4); 2:31 - pp - Teddy Townsend (5); 11:47 - Kaeden Hawkins (7); 15:27 - Dylan Compton (2)		Second period	No scoring
No scoring		Third period	No scoring
Carter Casey (29 saves / 29 shots)		Goalie stats	Yan Shostak (9 saves / 14 shots); William Prowse (11 saves / 11 shots)

May 1	Waterloo Black Hawks	3 – 0	Lincoln Stars	Young Arena
16:19 - pp - Kaeden Hawkins (8)		First period	No scoring
11:28 - pp - Grady Deering (2)		Second period	No scoring
17:57 - en - Grady Deering (3)		Third period	No scoring
Carter Casey (27 saves / 27 shots)		Goalie stats	Yan Shostak (31 saves / 33 shots)

Waterloo wins series 3 – 1

== Clark Cup Finals ==
=== (W3) Waterloo Black Hawks vs. (E4) Muskegon Lumberjacks ===
May 9	Waterloo Black Hawks	8 – 5	Muskegon Lumberjacks	Young Arena
1:38 - Ty Mason (1); 9:04 - Teddy Townsend (7); 9:26 - Samuel Huck (1); 16:43 - Teddy Townsend (8)		First period	Finn McLaughlin (1) - 1:29
8:33 - Teddy Townsend (9)		Second period	Václav Nestrašil (5) - 11:59; Finn McLaughlin (2) - 17:14; Ivan Ryabkin (6) - 18:36
1:11 - Reid Morich (4); 15:14 - pp - Grady Deering (4); 19:10 - en - Reid Morich (5)		Third period	Chase Stefanek (4) - 16:25
Carter Casey (31 saves / 36 shots)		Goalie stats	Shikhabutdin Gadzhiev (1 save / 4 shots); Stephen Peck (25 saves / 29 shots)

May 10	Waterloo Black Hawks	1 – 4	Muskegon Lumberjacks	Young Arena
No scoring		First period	No scoring
1:44 - Reid Morich (6)		Second period	Tynan Lawrence (7) - 9:49; David Deputy (9) - 16:33
No scoring		Third period	David Deputy (10) - pp - 9:46; Václav Nestrašil 6) - en - 19:59
Carter Casey (25 saves / 28 shots)		Goalie stats	Shikhabutdin Gadzhiev (22 saves / 23 shots)

May 16	Muskegon Lumberjacks	2 – 1	2OT	Waterloo Black Hawks	Trinity Health Arena
14:28 - Václav Nestrašil (7)		First period		No scoring
No scoring		Second period		No scoring
No scoring		Third period		Reid Daavettila (2) - 5:59
8:22 - Ivan Ryabkin (7)		Second overtime period		No scoring
Shikhabutdin Gadzhiev (40 saves / 41 shots)		Goalie stats		Carter Casey (40 saves / 42 shots)

May 17	Muskegon Lumberjacks	2 – 3	OT	Waterloo Black Hawks	Trinity Health Arena
No scoring		First period		No scoring
No scoring		Second period		Easton Hewson (2) - pp - 15:25
18:55 - Teddy Spitznagel (3); 19:59 - pp - Xavier Veilleux (3)		Third period		Grady Deering (5) - 14:33
No scoring		First overtime period		Chase Jette (5) - 1:32
Shikhabutdin Gadzhiev (29 saves / 32 shots)		Goalie stats		Carter Casey (28 saves / 30 shots)

May 20	Waterloo Black Hawks	3 – 4	OT	Muskegon Lumberjacks	Young Arena
No scoring		First period		Tynan Lawrence (8) - 3:53; Jack Christ (3) - 14:03
4:03 - Brendan McMorrow (7); 16:11 - Reid Morich (7)		Second period		No scoring
11:30 - Hunter Ramos (4)		Third period		Jack Christ (4) - 1:54
No scoring		First overtime period		Jack Christ (5) - 6:01
Carter Casey (28 saves / 32 shots)		Goalie stats		Shikhabutdin Gadzhiev (34 saves / 37 shots)

Muskegon wins series 3 – 2

== Playoff scoring leaders ==
Note: GP = Games played; G = Goals; A = Assists; PTS = Points; PIM = Penalty minutes

Player	Team	GP	G	A	PTS	PIM
Tynan Lawrence	Muskegon Lumberjacks	14	8	10	18	2
Ivan Ryabkin	Muskegon Lumberjacks	14	7	9	16	30
Teddy Townsend	Waterloo Black Hawks	15	9	6	15	20
Reid Morich	Waterloo Black Hawks	15	7	8	15	6
David Deputy	Muskegon Lumberjacks	14	10	4	15	21
Brendan McMorrow	Waterloo Black Hawks	15	7	7	14	4
Jack Galanek	Muskegon Lumberjacks	14	3	11	14	6
Václav Nestrašil	Muskegon Lumberjacks	14	7	6	13	8
Chase Jette	Waterloo Black Hawks	15	5	8	13	20
Beckett Hendrickson	Waterloo Black Hawks	15	4	9	13	26
Dylan Compton	Waterloo Black Hawks	15	2	11	13	8

== Playoff leading goaltenders ==
Note: GP = Games played; MIN = Minutes played; W = Wins; L = Losses; SO = Shutouts; GA = Goals Allowed; GAA = Goals against average; SV% = Save percentage

Player	Team	GP	MIN	W	L	SO	GA	GAA	SV%
Shikhabutdin Gadzhiev	Muskegon Lumberjacks	11	592	8	1	0	20	2.09	0.935
Liam Beerman	Dubuque Fighting Saints	7	396	3	4	0	15	2.27	0.922
Samuel Urban	Sioux City Musketeers	5	296	2	3	1	12	2.43	0.908
Carter Casey	Waterloo Black Hawks	15	948	10	5	2	40	2.43	0.908
Owen Lepak	Youngstown Phantoms	2	87	0	1	0	4	2.77	0.852

== Postseason awards ==
=== USHL awards ===
Award	Name	Team
Player of the Year	Will Zellers	Green Bay Gamblers
Forward of the Year	Will Zellers	Green Bay Gamblers
Defenseman of the Year	Luke Osburn	Youngstown Phantoms
Rookie of the Year	Ryker Lee	Madison Capitols
Goaltender of the Year	Yan Shostak	Lincoln Stars
Coach of the Year	Rocky Russo	Lincoln Stars
Scholar-Athlete of the Year	Dryden Allen	Dubuque Fighting Saints
Curt Hammer Award	Coleson Hanrahan	Youngstown Phantoms
General Manager of the Year	Nick Fabrizio	Lincoln Stars
The Gaudreau Award	Ethan Wyttenbach	Sioux Falls Stampede

=== All-USHL First Team ===
Position	Name	Team
Goalie	Yan Shostak	Lincoln Stars
Defenseman	Sam Laurila	Fargo Force
Defenseman	Luke Osburn	Youngstown Phantoms
Forward	Giacomo Martino	Sioux City Musketeers
Forward	Ryker Lee	Madison Capitols
Forward	Will Zellers	Green Bay Gamblers

=== All-USHL Second Team ===
Position	Name	Team
Goalie	Melvin Strahl	Youngstown Phantoms
Defenceman	Xavier Veilleux	Muskegon Lumberjacks
Defenceman	Dylan Compton	Waterloo Black Hawks
Forward	Aidan Park	Green Bay Gamblers
Forward	Jack Pechar	Lincoln Stars
Forward	Adam Benák	Youngstown Phantoms

=== All-USHL Third Team ===
Position	Name	Team
Goalie	Jan Špunar	Dubuque Fighting Saints
Defenseman	Étienne Lessard	Lincoln Stars
Defenseman	Lukas Peterson	Green Bay Gamblers
Forward	Landen Gunderson	Sioux City Musketeers
Forward	Artemi Nizameyev	Tri-City Storm
Forward	Nolan Roed	Tri-City Storm

=== USHL All-Rookie Team ===
Position	Name	Team
Goalie	William Prowse	Lincoln Stars
Defenseman	Jet Kwajah	Madison Capitols
Defenseman	Luka Radivojevič	Muskegon Lumberjacks
Forward	Tynan Lawrence	Muskegon Lumberjacks
Forward	Ryker Lee	Madison Capitols
Forward	Adam Benák	Youngstown Phantoms

=== All-Rookie Second Team ===
Position	Name	Team
Goalie	Michal Pradel	Tri-City Storm
Defenseman	Anthony Allain-Samake	Sioux City Musketeers
Defenseman	Anthony Bongo	Sioux Falls Stampede
Forward	Olivers Mūrnieks	Sioux City Musketeers
Forward	Blake Zielinksi	Des Moines Buccaneers
Forward	Ethan Wyttenbach	Sioux Falls Stampede
