= 2025–26 USHL season =

47th season of the USHL

- League: United States Hockey League
- Sport: Ice hockey
- Duration: Regular season September 17, 2025 – April 4, 2026; Postseason; April 2026 – May 2026
- Games: 62
- Teams: 16

USHL Entry Draft
- Top draft pick: Thaddeus McMahon
- Picked by: Omaha Lancers

Regular season
- Anderson Cup: Youngstown Phantoms
- Season MVP: Alex Pelletier (Lincoln Stars)
- Top scorer: Alex Pelletier (Lincoln Stars)

Clark Cup Playoffs
- Clark Cup Playoffs MVP: Linards Feldbergs (Stampede)
- Finals champions: Sioux Falls Stampede
- Runners-up: Muskegon Lumberjacks

USHL seasons
- ← 2024–25 2026–27 →

The 2025–26 USHL season was the 47th season of the United States Hockey League (USHL) as an all-junior league. The regular season extended from September 17, 2025, to April 4, 2026, with each member club playing a 62-game schedule.

As has become tradition, all 16 teams opened their respective campaigns in Cranberry Township, Pennsylvania, at the UPMC Lemieux Sports Complex during the annual DICK'S Sporting Goods USHL Fall Classic. The season concluded with the Clark Cup playoffs, which culminated in a best-of-five finals rematch between the Sioux Falls Stampede and the defending champions, the Muskegon Lumberjacks.

== League changes and offseason ==
The league held its annual 2025 USHL Draft on May 5–6, 2025. In Phase I of the selection process, the Omaha Lancers held the first overall selection and utilized it to draft defenseman Thaddeus McMahon.

The Cedar Rapids RoughRiders acquired goaltender Ryan Cameron, who had previously been recognized as the USA Hockey Goaltender of the Year. Cedar Rapids also signed high-scoring youth forward Braiden Scuderi. Other major junior tender contracts signed ahead of the season included forwards Gunnar Conboy and Oliver McKinney with the Green Bay Gamblers, as well as Michael Tang and Stephen Cover with the Madison Capitols.

=== Inter-league showcase games ===
The 2025–26 schedule featured marquee neutral-site properties:

- The American Cup powered by Wegmans took place on December 4–5, 2025, in Rochester, New York, featuring a multi-game series between the Tri-City Storm and the Youngstown Phantoms.
- The Frosty Cup was hosted in Frisco, Texas, on January 22–23, 2026, matching the Des Moines Buccaneers against the Fargo Force.
- The annual Chipotle All-American Game showcased top NHL Draft-eligible prospects from the league in mid-season exhibition play.

== Regular season ==
The Youngstown Phantoms clinched the Anderson Cup as the USHL regular-season champions, pacing the overall league standings and locking up the top seed in the Eastern Conference. In the Western Conference, the Sioux Falls Stampede captured the regular-season conference crown, comfortably ahead of the second-place Fargo Force.

=== Eastern Conference ===
| Team | GP | W | L | OTL | SOL | Pts |
|---|---|---|---|---|---|---|
| z – Youngstown Phantoms | 62 | 43 | 14 | 3 | 2 | 91 |
| x – Dubuque Fighting Saints | 62 | 40 | 18 | 4 | 0 | 84 |
| x – Green Bay Gamblers | 62 | 38 | 18 | 4 | 2 | 82 |
| x – Cedar Rapids RoughRiders | 62 | 36 | 17 | 3 | 6 | 81 |
| x – Muskegon Lumberjacks | 62 | 36 | 24 | 1 | 1 | 74 |
| x – Madison Capitols | 62 | 32 | 27 | 0 | 3 | 67 |
| Chicago Steel | 62 | 27 | 27 | 6 | 2 | 62 |
| Team USA | 62 | 17 | 40 | 3 | 2 | 39 |

=== Western Conference ===
| Team | GP | W | L | OTL | SOL | Pts |
|---|---|---|---|---|---|---|
| y – Sioux Falls Stampede | 62 | 43 | 16 | 3 | 0 | 89 |
| x – Fargo Force | 62 | 38 | 19 | 3 | 2 | 81 |
| x – Sioux City Musketeers | 62 | 30 | 27 | 3 | 2 | 65 |
| x – Des Moines Buccaneers | 62 | 30 | 27 | 3 | 2 | 65 |
| x – Lincoln Stars | 62 | 27 | 27 | 4 | 4 | 61 |
| x – Tri-City Storm | 62 | 26 | 29 | 4 | 3 | 59 |
| Omaha Lancers | 62 | 19 | 38 | 3 | 2 | 43 |
| Waterloo Black Hawks | 62 | 16 | 42 | 2 | 2 | 36 |

Note: x = clinched playoff berth; y = clinched conference title; z = clinched regular season title

== Individual statistics ==
=== Scoring leaders ===
The following players led the league in regular season points at the completion of games played on April 4, 2026.

| Player | Team | GP | G | A | Pts | PIM |
|---|---|---|---|---|---|---|
| Alex Pelletier | Lincoln Stars | 59 | 48 | 37 | 85 | 39 |
| Cooper Simpson | Youngstown Phantoms | 61 | 34 | 40 | 74 | 68 |
| Layne Loomer | Lincoln Stars | 59 | 30 | 42 | 72 | 29 |
| Thomas Zocco | Sioux Falls Stampede | 60 | 22 | 37 | 68 | 50 |
| Ryan Seelinger | Des Moines Buccaneers | 61 | 31 | 37 | 68 | 26 |
| Michael Barron | Dubuque Fighting Saints | 62 | 18 | 50 | 68 | 20 |
| Logan Renkowski | Sioux Falls Stampede | 60 | 43 | 20 | 63 | 38 |
| Zach Wooten | Green Bay Gamblers | 61 | 35 | 27 | 62 | 86 |
| Ryan Rucinski | Youngstown Phantoms | 59 | 27 | 35 | 62 | 88 |
| Drew Stewart | Muskegon Lumberjacks | 56 | 30 | 31 | 61 | 33 |
| Evan Jardine | Youngstown Phantoms | 53 | 27 | 34 | 61 | 70 |
| Luke Garry | Sioux City Musketeers | 57 | 21 | 40 | 61 | 76 |

=== Leading goaltenders ===
These are the goaltenders that lead the league in GAA that have played at least 1380 minutes.

Note: GP = Games played; Mins = Minutes played; W = Wins; L = Losses; OTL = Overtime losses; SOL = Shootout losses; SO = Shutouts; GAA = Goals against average; SV% = Save percentage

| Player | Team | GP | Mins | W | L | OTL | SOL | SO | GAA | SV% |
| Tobias Trejbal | Youngstown Phantoms | 42 | 2512 | 30 | 9 | 3 | 0 | 3 | 2.12 | 0.916 |
| Leo Henriquez | Green Bay Gamblers | 37 | 2109 | 21 | 9 | 2 | 2 | 2 | 2.22 | 0.921 |
| Caleb Heil | Madison Capitols | 31 | 1755 | 24 | 13 | 0 | 3 | 3 | 2.34 | 0.905 |
| Alan Lenďák | Des Moines Buccaneers | 34 | 2441 | 21 | 11 | 1 | 0 | 3 | 2.41 | 0.909 |
| Ajay White | Fargo Force | 42 | 2541 | 26 | 12 | 3 | 1 | 2 | 2.48 | 0.905 |
| Carl Axelsson | Muskegon Lumberjacks | 44 | 2540 | 28 | 14 | 1 | 0 | 2 | 2.48 | 0.916 |

== Clark Cup playoffs ==
Following the completion of the regular season, the top six teams from each conference qualified for the postseason. The first round featured lower-seeded matchups in a best-of-three series, while subsequent conference rounds expanded to best-of-five series formats.

In the Eastern Conference, the No. 5 seed Muskegon Lumberjacks swept Cedar Rapids in the opening round, before overcoming the Dubuque Fighting Saints and the Madison Capitols in consecutive five-game series. In the Western Conference, the top-ranked Sioux Falls Stampede defeated the Lincoln Stars in five games, advancing to the Western Conference Final where they also defeated the Fargo Force in a full five-game series.

The resulting matchup set up a best-of-five showdown for the Clark Cup between Sioux Falls and Muskegon, a rematch of the 2015 championship series.

=== Finals summary ===
Game 1 of the Clark Cup Finals took place on May 15, 2026, at the Denny Sanford PREMIER Center in Sioux Falls. Drew Stewart opened the scoring with a shorthanded goal to give Muskegon a 1–0 advantage. Sioux Falls responded with two goals from Joey Macrina, followed by an empty-net tally from J.J. Monteiro to claim a 3–1 win and a 1–0 series advantage.

In Game 2, Stampede netminder Linards Feldbergs stopped all shots faced to secure a 3–0 shutout victory. Tobias Ohman scored the game-winner in the opening period, while Thomas Zocco and Logan Renkowski added insurance goals to give the Stampede a 2–0 series hold heading into Muskegon.

== First Round ==
=== Eastern Conference ===
==== (E3) Green Bay Gamblers vs. (E6) Madison Capitols ====
| April 10 | Green Bay Gamblers | 1 – 2 | Madison Capitols | Resch Center |
| 9:59 - pp - Zach Wooten (1) | | First period | Harper Frey (1) - 12:10 |
| No scoring | | Second period | Nolen Geerdes (1) - pp - 18:20 |
| No scoring | | Third period | No scoring |
| Leo Henriquez (11 saves / 13 shots) | | Goalie stats | Caleb Heil (36 saves / 37 shots) |

| April 11 | Green Bay Gamblers | 1 – 2 | OT | Madison Capitols | Resch Center |
| No scoring | | First period | | No scoring |
| 9:34 - Zach Wooten (2) | | Second period | | Nolen Geerdes (2) - 7:48 |
| No scoring | | Third period | | No scoring |
| No scoring | | First overtime period | | Caleb Pittsley (1) - 0:58 |
| Leo Henriquez (24 saves / 26 shots) | | Goalie stats | | Caleb Heil (25 saves / 26 shots) |

| Madison wins series 2 – 0 |

==== (E4) Cedar Rapids RoughRiders vs. (E5) Muskegon Lumberjacks ====
| April 10 | Cedar Rapids RoughRiders | 2 – 3 | Muskegon Lumberjacks | ImOn Ice Arena |
| 8:20 - Nick Romeo (1) | | First period | No scoring |
| 11:27 - Connor Davis (1) | | Second period | Melvin Novotny (1) - pp - 9:59; Carter Sanderson (1) - 18:41 |
| No scoring | | Third period | Melvin Novotny (2) - 4:49 |
| Ryan Cameron (25 saves / 28 shots) | | Goalie stats | Carl Axelsson (17 saves / 19 shots) |

| April 11 | Cedar Rapids RoughRiders | 2 – 5 | Muskegon Lumberjacks | ImOn Ice Arena |
| 1:20 - Nick Romeo (2) | | First period | No scoring |
| No scoring | | Second period | Drew Stewart (1) - sh - 9:25; Nathan Larioza (1) - 11:49; Max Cullen (1) - 15:37 |
| 9:09 - sh - Connor Davis (2) | | Third period | Chuck Blanchard (1) - en - 18:55; Viktor Nörringer (1) - en - 19:47 |
| Ryan Cameron (21 saves / 24 shots) | | Goalie stats | Carl Axelsson (20 saves / 22 shots) |

| Muskegon wins series 2 – 0 |

=== Western Conference ===
==== (W3) Sioux City Musketeers vs. (W6) Tri-City Storm ====
| April 10 | Sioux City Musketeers | 4 – 3 | OT | Tri-City Storm | IBP Ice Center |
| 1:04 - Daniil Butin (1); 15:31 - Gavin Garry (1) | | First period | | No scoring |
| 6:03 - Luke Garry (1) | | Second period | | Cam Springer (1) - 0:39; Bode Laylin (1) - 8:44 |
| No scoring | | Third period | | Brecken Smith (1) - 4:28 |
| 3:18 - Ashton Schultz (1) | | First overtime period | | No scoring |
| Jack Fichthorn (29 saves / 32 shots) | | Goalie stats | | Michal Pradel (10 saves / 13 shots); Owen Nelson (21 saves / 22 shots) |

| April 11 | Sioux City Musketeers | 6 – 2 | Tri-City Storm | IBP Ice Center |
| 11:38 - William Tomko (1); 18:15 - Shayne Gould (1) | | First period | No scoring |
| No scoring | | Second period | No scoring |
| 6:59 - Pavel Martinů (1); 8:46 - Trey Jefferis (1); 16:48 - en - Ashton Schultz (2); 17:45 - en - Pavel Martinů (2) | | Third period | Cooper Ernewein (1) - 9:54; Ashton Dahms (1) - 15:05 |
| Ryder Shea (25 saves / 27 shots) | | Goalie stats | Quinn Beumer (22 saves / 26 shots) |

| Sioux City wins series 2 – 0 |

==== (W4) Des Moines Buccaneers vs. (W5) Lincoln Stars ====
| April 9 | Des Moines Buccaneers | 3 – 2 | Lincoln Stars | The MidAmerican Energy Company RecPlex |
| 3:14 - Cade De St. Hubert (1); 5:46 - Rhys Wallin (1) | | First period | Griffin Brown (1) - 13:45 |
| 5:01 - Henry Major (1) | | Second period | No scoring |
| No scoring | | Third period | Layne Loomer (1) - 8:43 |
| Alan Lenďák (18 saves / 20 shots) | | Goalie stats | Charles Menard (29 saves / 32 shots) |

| April 10 | Des Moines Buccaneers | 4 – 8 | Lincoln Stars | The MidAmerican Energy Company RecPlex |
| 11:10 - pp - Ryan Seelinger (1); 17:03 - Blake Zielinski (1) | | First period | Nate Pederson (1) - pp - 6:38; Kade Kohanski (1) - 11:26; Layne Loomer (2) - 12:23 |
| No scoring | | Second period | John Hirschfeld (1) - 3:18; Cooper Williams (1) - 7:03 |
| 11:02 - Henry Major (2); 19:17 - Cade De St. Hubert (2) | | Third period | Josef Eichler (1) - pp - 9:27; Layne Loomer (3) - 14:50; Samuel Murin (1) - 18:00 |
| Andrei Nikolayev (17 saves / 25 shots) | | Goalie stats | William Prowse (27 saves / 31 shots) |

| April 11 | Des Moines Buccaneers | 3 – 6 | Lincoln Stars | The MidAmerican Energy Company RecPlex |
| No scoring | | First period | 6:06 - Casey Vandertop (1); 14:13 - Kade Kohanski (2) |
| Ryan Seelinger (2) - 3:58; Blake Zielinski (2) - 14:53 | | Second period | 3:00 - pp - Nikolas Young (1) |
| Luke Norcross (1) - 2:33 | | Third period | 3:32 - pp - Alex Pelletier (1); 15:55 - Alex Pelletier (2); 19:05 - en - Josef Eichler (2) |
| Alan Lenďák (19 saves / 24 shots) | | Goalie stats | William Prowse (31 saves / 34 shots) |

| Lincoln wins series 2 – 1 |

== Conference Semifinals ==
=== Eastern Conference ===
==== (E1) Youngstown Phantoms vs. (E6) Madison Capitols ====
| April 17 | Youngstown Phantoms | 1 – 2 | Madison Capitols | Covelli Centre |
| No scoring | | First period | Tyden Bergeson (1) - 6:24 |
| No scoring | | Second period | No scoring |
| 17:31 - Cooper Simpson (1) | | Third period | Tyden Bergeson (2) - 8:46 |
| Tobias Trejbal (15 saves / 17 shots) | | Goalie stats | Caleb Heil (32 saves / 33 shots) |

| April 18 | Youngstown Phantoms | 0 – 1 | OT | Madison Capitols | Covelli Centre |
| No scoring | | First period | | No scoring |
| No scoring | | Second period | | No scoring |
| No scoring | | Third period | | No scoring |
| No scoring | | First overtime period | | Eero Butella (1) - 17:06 |
| Tobias Trejbal (13 saves / 14 shots) | | Goalie stats | | Caleb Heil (40 saves / 40 shots) |

| April 24 | Madison Capitols | 2 – 4 | Youngstown Phantoms | Bob Suter's Capitol Ice Arena |
| No scoring | | First period | No scoring |
| 0:32 - John Stout (1); 18:53 - Jackson Nevers (1) | | Second period | Ryan Rucinski (1) - 0:59; Richard Žemlička (1) - 19:23 |
| No scoring | | Third period | Matouš Kucharčík (1) - 13:16; Jack Hextall (1) - en - 19:40 |
| Caleb Heil (31 saves / 34 shots) | | Goalie stats | Tobias Trejbal (21 saves / 23 shots) |

| April 25 | Madison Capitols | 2 – 1 | Youngstown Phantoms | Bob Suter's Capitol Ice Arena |
| 2:42 - pp - Eero Butella (2) | | First period | No scoring |
| 6:28 - Nolen Geerdes (3) | | Second period | Evan Jardine (1) - 2:29 |
| No scoring | | Third period | No scoring |
| Caleb Heil (37 saves / 38 shots) | | Goalie stats | Tobias Trejbal (11 saves / 13 shots) |

| Madison wins series 3 – 1 |

==== (E2) Dubuque Fighting Saints vs. (E5) Muskegon Lumberjacks ====
| April 17 | Dubuque Fighting Saints | 2 – 1 | Muskegon Lumberjacks | ImOn Arena |
| No scoring | | First period | No scoring |
| No scoring | | Second period | No scoring |
| 10:42 - Melvin Ekman (1); 18:09 - Xavier Lieb (1) | | Third period | Niles Benson (1) - 19:09 |
| Vojtěch Hambálek (25 saves / 26 shots) | | Goalie stats | Carl Axelsson (17 saves / 19 shots) |

| April 18 | Dubuque Fighting Saints | 2 – 6 | Muskegon Lumberjacks | ImOn Arena |
| 2:04 - pp - Michael Barron (1) | | First period | Anthony Thomas-Maroon (1) - 3:54; Max Cullen (2) - 13:10 |
| No scoring | | Second period | Ty Bergeron (1) - 0:46; Chuck Blanchard (2) - pp - 19:31 |
| 3:44 - Michael Barron (2) | | Third period | Jack Christ (1) - 11:45; Drew Stewart (2) - 13:44 |
| Vojtěch Hambálek (30 saves / 36 shots) | | Goalie stats | Carl Axelsson (15 saves / 17 shots) |

| April 24 | Muskegon Lumberjacks | 2 – 5 | Dubuque Fighting Saints | Trinity Health Arena |
| No scoring | | First period | Michael Barron (3) - 4:20 |
| 11:57 - Viktor Nörringer (2) | | Second period | Caden Dabrowski (1) - 10:14; Gavin Lock (1) - 19:43 |
| 15:02 - Jack Christ (2) | | Third period | Xavier Lieb (2) - 3:26; Masun Fleece (1) - en - 19:55 |
| Carl Axelsson (23 saves / 27 shots) | | Goalie stats | Vojtěch Hambálek (35 saves / 37 shots) |

| April 25 | Muskegon Lumberjacks | 4 – 2 | Dubuque Fighting Saints | Trinity Health Arena |
| No scoring | | First period | No scoring |
| 1:52 - Jack Christ (3); 7:59 - pp - Viktor Nörringer (3); 18:24 - Drew Stewart (3) | | Second period | No scoring |
| 2:04 - sh - Drew Stewart (4) | | Third period | Michael Barron (4) - pp - 4:10; Michael Barron (5) - 14:28 |
| Carl Axelsson (31 saves / 33 shots) | | Goalie stats | Vojtěch Hambálek (34 saves / 38 shots) |

| April 28 | Dubuque Fighting Saints | 1 – 6 | Muskegon Lumberjacks | ImOn Arena |
| 9:03 - Luke Brierley (1) | | First period | Carter Sanderson (2) - 10:22 |
| No scoring | | Second period | Adam Beluško (1) - 5:59; Melvin Novotny (3) - 16:51 |
| No scoring | | Third period | Rūdolfs Bērzkalns (1) - 3:26; Adam Beluško (2) - en - 16:15; Niles Benson (2) - 16:46 |
| Vojtěch Hambálek (25 saves / 30 shots) | | Goalie stats | Carl Axelsson (19 saves / 20 shots) |

| Muskegon wins series 3 – 2 |

=== Western Conference ===
==== (W2) Fargo Force vs. (W3) Sioux City Musketeers ====
| April 18 | Fargo Force | 4 – 1 | Sioux City Musketeers | Scheels Arena |
| 4:54 - Kolin Sisson (1); 14:32 - Cullen McCrate (1) | | First period | No scoring |
| 9:55 - Gavin Uhlenkamp (1) | | Second period | No scoring |
| 6:03 - pp - Graham Jones (1) | | Third period | Aidan Dyer (1) - 7:36 |
| Ajay White (30 saves / 31 shots) | | Goalie stats | Jack Fichthorn (42 saves / 46 shots) |

| April 19 | Fargo Force | 7 – 4 | Sioux City Musketeers | Scheels Arena |
| 12:29 - Kolin Sisson (2); 19:37 - pp - Gavin Uhlenkamp (2) | | First period | Daniil Butin (2) - 4:11; Dakotah Bailey (1) - 11:18; Ashton Schultz (3) - 19:58 |
| 6:02 - Jacob Sagadin (1); 15:02 - Brooks Cullen (1) | | Second period | Gavin Garry (2) - 15:48 |
| 9:46 - Nate Delladonna (1); 16:11 - pp - Gavin Uhlenkamp (3); 17:24 - en - Saxton Tess (1) | | Third period | No scoring |
| Ajay White (30 saves / 34 shots) | | Goalie stats | Ryder Shea (33 saves / 37 shots); Jack Fichthorn (13 saves / 15 shots) |

| April 23 | Sioux City Musketeers | 2 – 1 | OT | Fargo Force | Tyson Events Center |
| 5:33 - Dakotah Bailey (2) | | First period | | No scoring |
| No scoring | | Second period | | Gavin Uhlenkamp (4) - pp - 16:22 |
| No scoring | | Third period | | No scoring |
| Ashton Schultz (4) - 1:39 | | First overtime period | | No scoring |
| Jack Fichthorn (28 saves / 29 shots) | | Goalie stats | | Ajay White (20 saves / 22 shots) |

| April 25 | Sioux City Musketeers | 2 – 3 | 2OT | Fargo Force | Tyson Events Center |
| 3:57 - Gavin Garry (3) | | First period | | Saxton Tess (2) - 15:36 |
| 16:41 - William Tomko (2) | | Second period | | Nate Delladonna (2) - sh - 6:51 |
| No scoring | | Third period | | No scoring |
| No scoring | | Second overtime period | | Gavin Uhlenkamp (5) - 8:53 |
| Jack Fichthorn (31 saves / 34 shots) | | Goalie stats | | Ajay White (24 saves / 26 shots) |

| Fargo wins series 3 – 1 |

==== (W1) Sioux Falls Stampede vs. (W5) Lincoln Stars ====
| April 17 | Sioux Falls Stampede | 5 – 2 | Lincoln Stars | Denny Sanford Premier Center |
| 3:21 - Matthew Grimes (1); 14:55 - pp - Jake Prunty (1) | | First period | No scoring |
| 15:20 - Matthew Grimes (2) | | Second period | Kade Kohanski (3) - 13:11 |
| 7:46 - Anthony Bongo (1); 18:09 - en - J.J. Monteiro (1) | | Third period | Layne Loomer (4) - 11:14 |
| Linards Feldbergs (24 saves / 26 shots) | | Goalie stats | William Prowse (34 saves / 38 shots) |

| April 19 | Sioux Falls Stampede | 3 – 4 | OT | Lincoln Stars | Denny Sanford Premier Center |
| No scoring | | First period | | No scoring |
| 1:19 - pp - Logan Renkowski (1); 4:57 - J.J. Monteiro (2) | | Second period | | Cole Braunshausen (1) - 13:00; KJ Sauer (1) - pp - 14:01 |
| 7:40 - pp - Jack Brauti (1) | | Third period | | Kade Kohanski (4) - 14:35 |
| No scoring | | First overtime period | | Alex Pelletier (3) - 9:35 |
| Linards Feldbergs (30 saves / 34 shots) | | Goalie stats | | Charles Menard (41 saves / 44 shots) |

| April 24 | Lincoln Stars | 6 – 2 | Sioux Falls Stampede | Ice Box |
| 10:12 - pp - Cooper Williams (2); 17:51 - John Hirschfeld (2) | | First period | No scoring |
| 0:40 - pp - Kade Kohanski (5); 7:28 - pp - Kade Kohanski (6) | | Second period | Thomas Zocco (1) - pp - 15:03 |
| 7:12 - pp - Alex Pelletier (4); 12:12 - sh - en - Evan Malkhassian (1) | | Third period | Markus Jakobsen (1) - pp - 13:14 |
| Charles Menard (57 saves / 59 shots) | | Goalie stats | Linards Feldbergs (40 saves / 45 shots) |

| April 25 | Lincoln Stars | 1 – 5 | Sioux Falls Stampede | Ice Box |
| 14:38 - Layne Loomer (5) | | First period | Matthew Grimes (3) - 10:52; J.J. Monteiro (3) - pp - 16:40 |
| No scoring | | Second period | Logan Renkowski (2) - pp - 4:55; Brent Solomon (1) - pp - 17:27 |
| No scoring | | Third period | Logan Renkowski (3) - 15:37 |
| Charles Menard (26 saves / 31 shots) | | Goalie stats | Linards Feldbergs (25 saves / 26 shots) |

| April 28 | Sioux Falls Stampede | 2 – 0 | Lincoln Stars | Denny Sanford Premier Center |
| No scoring | | First period | No scoring |
| 3:26 - sh - Brent Solomon (2) | | Second period | No scoring |
| 5:42 - Brent Solomon (3) | | Third period | No scoring |
| Linards Feldbergs (24 saves / 24 shots) | | Goalie stats | Charles Menard (34 saves / 36 shots) |

| Sioux Falls wins series 3 – 2 |

== Conference Finals ==
=== Eastern Conference ===
==== (E5) Muskegon Lumberjacks vs. (E6) Madison Capitols ====
| May 1 | Muskegon Lumberjacks | 1 – 2 | Madison Capitols | Trinity Health Arena |
| No scoring | | First period | No scoring |
| 15:00 - Ty Bergeron (2) | | Second period | No scoring |
| No scoring | | Third period | Jackson Nevers (2) - 2:59; Tyden Bergeson (3) - 19:04 |
| Carl Axelsson (20 saves / 22 shots) | | Goalie stats | Caleb Heil (39 saves / 40 shots) |

| May 2 | Muskegon Lumberjacks | 5 – 3 | Madison Capitols | Trinity Health Arena |
| 4:52 - Carter Amico (1) | | First period | Stephen Cover (1) - 1:46 |
| 7:11 - Jack Christ (4); 16:25 - Drew Stewart (5) | | Second period | Michael Tang (1) - 18:14 |
| 16:08 - Carter Sanderson (3); 18:45 - en - Rūdolfs Bērzkalns (2) | | Third period | Lucas Prud'homme (1) - 12:04 |
| Carl Axelsson (19 saves / 22 shots) | | Goalie stats | Caleb Heil (41 saves / 45 shots) |

| May 8 | Madison Capitols | 4 – 1 | Muskegon Lumberjacks | Bob Suter's Capitol Ice Arena |
| No scoring | | First period | No scoring |
| No scoring | | Second period | No scoring |
| 11:20 - Nolen Geerdes (4); 17:42 - Caleb Pittsley (2); 18:09 - en - Tyden Bergeson (4); 18:29 - en - Sam Kappell (1) | | Third period | Niles Benson (3) - 16:46 |
| Caleb Heil (20 saves / 21 shots) | | Goalie stats | Carl Axelsson (18 saves / 20 shots) |

| May 9 | Madison Capitols | 1 – 4 | Muskegon Lumberjacks | Bob Suter's Capitol Ice Arena |
| No scoring | | First period | No scoring |
| No scoring | | Second period | Drew Stewart (6) - 7:51; Carter Amico (2) - 11:47; Carter Sanderson (4) - pp - 14:59 |
| 17:36 - Jackson Nevers (3) | | Third period | Nathan Larioza (2) - en - 18:29 |
| Caleb Heil (32 saves / 35 shots) | | Goalie stats | Carl Axelsson (20 saves / 21 shots) |

| May 11 | Muskegon Lumberjacks | 6 – 2 | Madison Capitols | Trinity Health Arena |
| 15:35 - Anthony Thomas-Maroon (2) | | First period | Harper Frey (2) - 5:49; Caleb Pittsley (3) - 8:36 |
| 2:22 - pp - Rūdolfs Bērzkalns (3); 7:38 - Louis Jonerheim (1); 18:03 - pp - Rūdolfs Bērzkalns (4) | | Second period | No scoring |
| 6:39 - pp - Niles Benson (4); 9:28 - pp - Drew Stewart (7) | | Third period | No scoring |
| Carl Axelsson (21 saves / 23 shots) | | Goalie stats | Caleb Heil (38 saves / 44 shots) |

| Muskegon wins series 3 – 2 |

=== Western Conference ===
==== (W1) Sioux Falls Stampede vs. (W2) Fargo Force ====
| May 1 | Sioux Falls Stampede | 6 – 2 | Fargo Force | Denny Sanford Premier Center |
| 3:57 - Brent Solomon (4); 7:57 - J.J. Monteiro (4); 8:27 - pp - Jake Prunty (2); 12:10 - pp - Brock Schultz (1) | | First period | No scoring |
| 15:19 - Anthony Bongo (2) | | Second period | Mason West (1) - 19:00 |
| 12:48 - J.J. Monteiro (5) | | Third period | Saxton Tess (3) - sh - 7:05 |
| Linards Feldbergs (22 saves / 24 shots) | | Goalie stats | Ajay White (37 saves / 43 shots) |

| May 2 | Sioux Falls Stampede | 1 – 2 | OT | Fargo Force | Denny Sanford Premier Center |
| 19:08 - Thomas Zocco (2) | | First period | | Kolin Sisson (3) - 11:57 |
| No scoring | | Second period | | No scoring |
| No scoring | | Third period | | No scoring |
| No scoring | | First overtime period | | Axel Löfgren (1) - 17:05 |
| Linards Feldbergs (18 saves / 20 shots) | | Goalie stats | | Ajay White (44 saves / 45 shots) |

| May 8 | Fargo Force | 4 – 3 | 3OT | Sioux Falls Stampede | Scheels Arena |
| 7:32 - Garrett Lindberg (1) | | First period | | Brock Schultz (2) - pp - 17:32 |
| 5:13 - Mason West (2) | | Second period | | Logan Renkowski (4) - 5:02; Logan Renkowski (5) - sh - 14:11 |
| 19:18 - Gavin Uhlenkamp (6) | | Third period | | No scoring |
| 5:17 - sh - Nate Delladonna (3) | | Third overtime period | | No scoring |
| Ajay White (65 saves / 68 shots) | | Goalie stats | | Linards Feldbergs (68 saves / 72 shots) |

| May 9 | Fargo Force | 1 – 2 | OT | Sioux Falls Stampede | Scheels Arena |
| 6:38 - Arseni Marchenko (1) | | First period | | No scoring |
| No scoring | | Second period | | Noah Mannausau (1) - 16:09 |
| No scoring | | Third period | | No scoring |
| No scoring | | First overtime period | | Thomas Zocco (3) - pp - 12:04 |
| Ajay White (51 saves / 53 shots) | | Goalie stats | | Linards Feldbergs (48 saves / 49 shots) |

| May 12 | Sioux Falls Stampede | 3 – 2 | Fargo Force | Denny Sanford Premier Center |
| No scoring | | First period | Axel Löfgren (2) - pp - 12:20 |
| 2:52 - pp - Logan Renkowski (6); 18:58 - Logan Renkowski (7) | | Second period | Graham Jones (2) - pp - 11:49 |
| 17:42 - Joey Macrina (1) | | Third period | No scoring |
| Linards Feldbergs (18 saves / 20 shots) | | Goalie stats | Ajay White (35 saves / 38 shots) |

| Sioux Falls wins series 3 – 2 |

== Clark Cup Finals ==
=== (W1) Sioux Falls Stampede vs. (E5) Muskegon Lumberjacks ===
| May 15 | Sioux Falls Stampede | 3 – 1 | Muskegon Lumberjacks | Denny Sanford Premier Center |
| No scoring | | First period | Drew Stewart (8) - 5:14 |
| 12:39 - Joey Macrina (2) | | Second period | No scoring |
| 12:07 - Joey Macrina (3); 18:04 - en - J.J. Monteiro (6) | | Third period | No scoring |
| Linards Feldbergs (27 saves / 28 shots) | | Goalie stats | Carl Axelsson (27 saves / 29 shots) |

| May 16 | Sioux Falls Stampede | 3 – 0 | Muskegon Lumberjacks | Denny Sanford Premier Center |
| 18:14 - Tobias Öhman (1) | | First period | No scoring |
| 16:13 - Thomas Zocco (4) | | Second period | No scoring |
| 16:12 - en - Logan Renkowski (8) | | Third period | No scoring |
| Linards Feldbergs (39 saves / 39 shots) | | Goalie stats | Carl Axelsson (31 saves / 33 shots) |

| May 22 | Muskegon Lumberjacks | 4 – 3 | 2OT | Sioux Falls Stampede | Trinity Health Arena |
| 19:40 - Niles Benson (5) | | First period | | Anthony Bongo (3) - 9:29 |
| No scoring | | Second period | | Thomas Zocco (5) - 1:48; Cooper Soller (1) - pp - 10:48 |
| 16:05 - Melvin Novotny (4); 17:29 - Carter Amico (3) | | Third period | | No scoring |
| 2:09 - Drew Stewart (9) | | Second overtime period | | No scoring |
| Carl Axelsson (32 saves / 35 shots) | | Goalie stats | | Linards Feldbergs (51 saves / 55 shots) |

| May 23 | Muskegon Lumberjacks | 3 – 4 | 2OT | Sioux Falls Stampede | Trinity Health Arena |
| 8:20 - Jack Christ (5) | | First period | | J.J. Monteiro (7) - pp - 10:37 |
| 17:20 - Louis Jonerheim (2) | | Second period | | Brent Solomon (5) - pp - 13:23 |
| 18:22 - Melvin Novotny (5) | | Third period | | J.J. Monteiro (8) - 3:35 |
| No scoring | | Second overtime period | | Joey Macrina (4) - 6:48 |
| Carl Axelsson (43 saves / 47 shots) | | Goalie stats | | Linards Feldbergs (41 saves / 44 shots) |

| Sioux Falls wins series 3 – 1 |

== Playoff scoring leaders ==
Note: GP = Games played; G = Goals; A = Assists; PTS = Points; PIM = Penalty minutes

| Player | Team | GP | G | A | PTS | PIM |
|---|---|---|---|---|---|---|
| Drew Stewart | Muskegon Lumberjacks | 16 | 9 | 7 | 16 | 12 |
| Melvin Novotny | Muskegon Lumberjacks | 16 | 5 | 10 | 15 | 10 |
| J.J. Monteiro | Sioux Falls Stampede | 14 | 8 | 6 | 14 | 22 |
| Thomas Zocco | Sioux Falls Stampede | 14 | 5 | 8 | 13 | 10 |
| Layne Loomer | Lincoln Stars | 8 | 5 | 7 | 12 | 8 |
| Viktor Nörringer | Muskegon Lumberjacks | 15 | 3 | 9 | 12 | 6 |
| Adam Beluško | Muskegon Lumberjacks | 16 | 2 | 9 | 11 | 10 |
| Kade Kohanski | Lincoln Stars | 8 | 6 | 4 | 10 | 4 |
| Jack Christ | Muskegon Lumberjacks | 16 | 5 | 5 | 10 | 2 |
| Nolen Geerdes | Madison Capitols | 11 | 4 | 6 | 10 | 12 |
| Rūdolfs Bērzkalns | Muskegon Lumberjacks | 16 | 4 | 6 | 10 | 4 |
| Graham Jones | Fargo Force | 9 | 2 | 8 | 10 | 10 |

== Playoff leading goaltenders ==
Note: GP = Games played; MIN = Minutes played; W = Wins; L = Losses; SO = Shutouts; GA = Goals Allowed; GAA = Goals against average; SV% = Save percentage

| Player | Team | GP | MIN | W | L | SO | GA | GAA | SV% |
|---|---|---|---|---|---|---|---|---|---|
| Tobias Trejbal | Youngstown Phantoms | 4 | 254 | 1 | 3 | 0 | 7 | 1.66 | 0.896 |
| Linards Feldbergs | Sioux Falls Stampede | 14 | 972 | 9 | 5 | 2 | 31 | 1.91 | 0.939 |
| Caleb Heil | Madison Capitols | 11 | 675 | 7 | 4 | 1 | 22 | 1.95 | 0.944 |
| Leo Henriquez | Green Bay Gamblers | 2 | 119 | 0 | 2 | 0 | 4 | 2.01 | 0.897 |
| Carl Axelsson | Muskegon Lumberjacks | 16 | 993 | 9 | 7 | 0 | 36 | 2.17 | 0.912 |

== League awards ==
The USHL announced its annual end-of-season awards following evaluations by member general managers.

=== All-USHL First Team ===
- Forward: Alex Pelletier (Lincoln Stars) – Led the league with 48 goals and 85 points in 59 appearances, tying for the second-most single-season goals in Tier-1 USHL history.
- Forward: Cooper Simpson (Youngstown Phantoms) – Generated 74 points, including 38 on the power play, aiding Youngstown's run to the Anderson Cup.
- Forward: Zach Wooten (Green Bay Gamblers) – Finished with 35 goals and 62 points in 61 games.
- Defenseman: Jack Willson (Youngstown Phantoms) – Finished second among defensemen with 47 points, including 27 power-play points.
- Defenseman: Hawke Huff (Cedar Rapids RoughRiders) – Recorded 39 points and led all team blueliners with a +17 rating.
- Goaltender: Tobias Trejbal (Youngstown Phantoms) – Posted a league-best 2.12 goals-against average alongside a 30–9–3 record.

=== Academic honors ===
- Scholar-Athlete of the Year: Ryan Poirier
