= Nestrašil =

Nestrašil (feminine: Nestrašilová) is a Czech surname. Notable people with the surname include:

- Andrej Nestrašil (born 1991), Czech ice hockey player
- Václav Nestrašil (born 2007), Czech ice hockey player
