= Charlie Coyle =

American ice hockey player (born 1992)

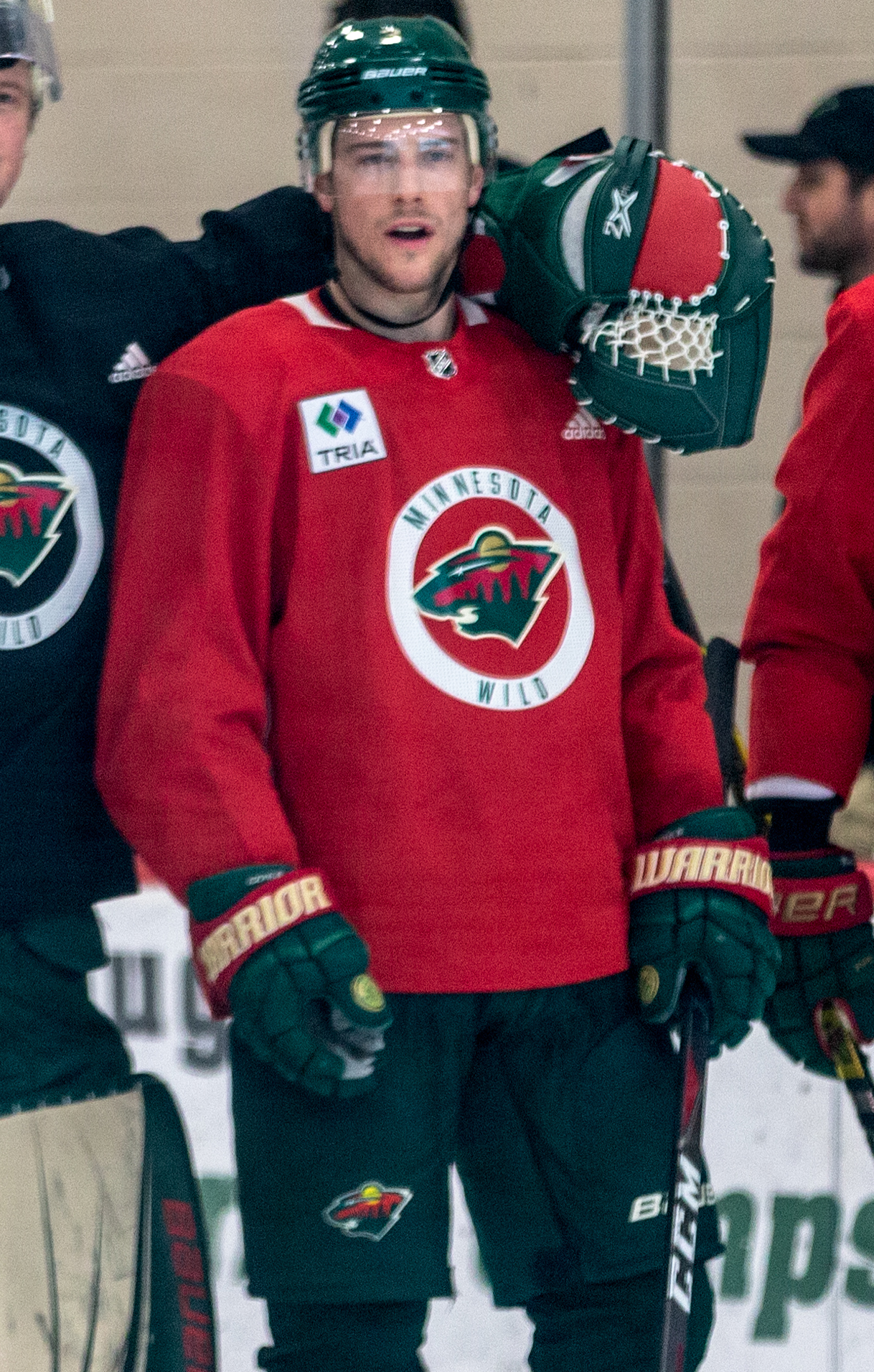
- Coyle with the Minnesota Wild in 2019
- Born: March 2, 1992 (age 34) Weymouth, Massachusetts, U.S.
- Height: 6 ft 3 in (191 cm)
- Weight: 220 lb (100 kg; 15 st 10 lb)
- Position: Forward
- Shoots: Right
- NHL team Former teams: Columbus Blue Jackets; Minnesota Wild; Boston Bruins; Colorado Avalanche
- National team: United States
- NHL draft: 28th overall, 2010; San Jose Sharks
- Playing career: 2012–present

Charles Robert Coyle (born March 2, 1992) is an American professional ice hockey player who is a forward and alternate captain for the Columbus Blue Jackets of the National Hockey League (NHL). He has also played for the Minnesota Wild, Boston Bruins, and the Colorado Avalanche.

Coyle played part of a single season with the Saint John Sea Dogs of the Quebec Major Junior Hockey League (QMJHL) in 2012. He played for Boston University's Terriers ice hockey team before he was drafted by the San Jose Sharks in the first round, 28th overall, of the 2010 NHL entry draft. In 2011, he was traded to the Wild, with whom he played the first six years of his professional career before he was traded to the Bruins in 2019.

== Playing career ==
=== Amateur ===
A native of Massachusetts, Coyle played for Weymouth High School, a public school, during his freshman year and helped the Wildcat varsity hockey team to their first-ever Super 8 finals appearance, in which they played at the TD Garden against Boston College High School, a private school. The Wildcats beat notable private schools during the playoffs during their stunning run, eliminating schools such as Malden Catholic High School, Austin Preparatory School and Central Catholic High School. He played for Thayer Academy in Braintree before finishing his senior season back with the Wildcats.

Coyle played Tier III Junior A ice hockey in the Eastern Junior Hockey League (EJHL) with the South Shore Kings, based in Foxboro. In the first and only season with South Shore, he finished fifth overall in scoring with 63 points in 42 games.

Coyle committed to play NCAA Division I college ice hockey with the Boston University Terriers of the Hockey East for the 2010–11 season. In his first game for the Terriers (an exhibition game against the University of Toronto), he scored two assists. He went on to record 26 points in 37 regular season games for the Terriers.

On December 16, 2011, Coyle made the decision to leave Boston University and sign with the Saint John Sea Dogs of the Quebec Major Junior Hockey League (QMJHL).

=== Professional ===
==== Minnesota Wild ====
Coyle was drafted by the San Jose Sharks in the first round of the 2010 NHL entry draft. On June 25, 2011, he was traded (along with Devin Setoguchi and a 2011 first-round pick) to the Minnesota Wild in exchange for Brent Burns and a 2012 second-round pick.

On March 1, 2012, Coyle signed a three-year, entry-level contract with the Wild, with the team keeping him in the QMJHL with the Saint John Sea Dogs until the end of the 2011–12 season.

Coyle made his NHL debut on February 4, 2013. Wearing number 63, Charlie skated 12:44, with two shots and a hit. Coyle scored his first NHL goal (and point) against Joey MacDonald of the Calgary Flames on February 23, 2013. Coyle scored a memorable goal against the Los Angeles Kings on March 30, 2013—while shooting a one-timer, Coyle got taken down to his knees, received his own rebound, then buried a backhand shot for his eighth goal of the season. Coyle also got into his first NHL fight against the Columbus Blue Jackets, taking on Brandon Dubinsky. He was given a match penalty for a hit on Artem Anisimov, which sparked the fight. After further review from the NHL, he was not given any additional discipline.

Coyle switched his jersey number from 63 to 3, the same number he wore in college and in the QMJHL.

Charlie made headlines after making a fan named Henry's dreams come true after waving to the boy during warm-ups. The gesture and Henry's reaction to the gesture were put on YouTube and it went viral. Charlie met Henry and his family a few weeks later, a day before a game between the Wild and the St. Louis Blues.

In the 2015–16 season, Coyle was second on the team in goals scored, behind veteran Zach Parise. He set personal bests in goals, assists and points, breaking the 20-goal plateau for the first time in his career.

Early in the 2017–18 season, Coyle was placed on long-term injury reserve after breaking his leg in a game against the Chicago Blackhawks. This ended his franchise-record game streak of 316 consecutive games. He returned to the Wild's lineup on November 20, 2017, after missing 16 games. In a game against the New York Rangers on February 13, 2018, a puck caught him high on the mouth, requiring stitches to close it. He required more stitches later on in the season against the Arizona Coyotes when a stick caught him in the mouth.

==== Boston Bruins ====
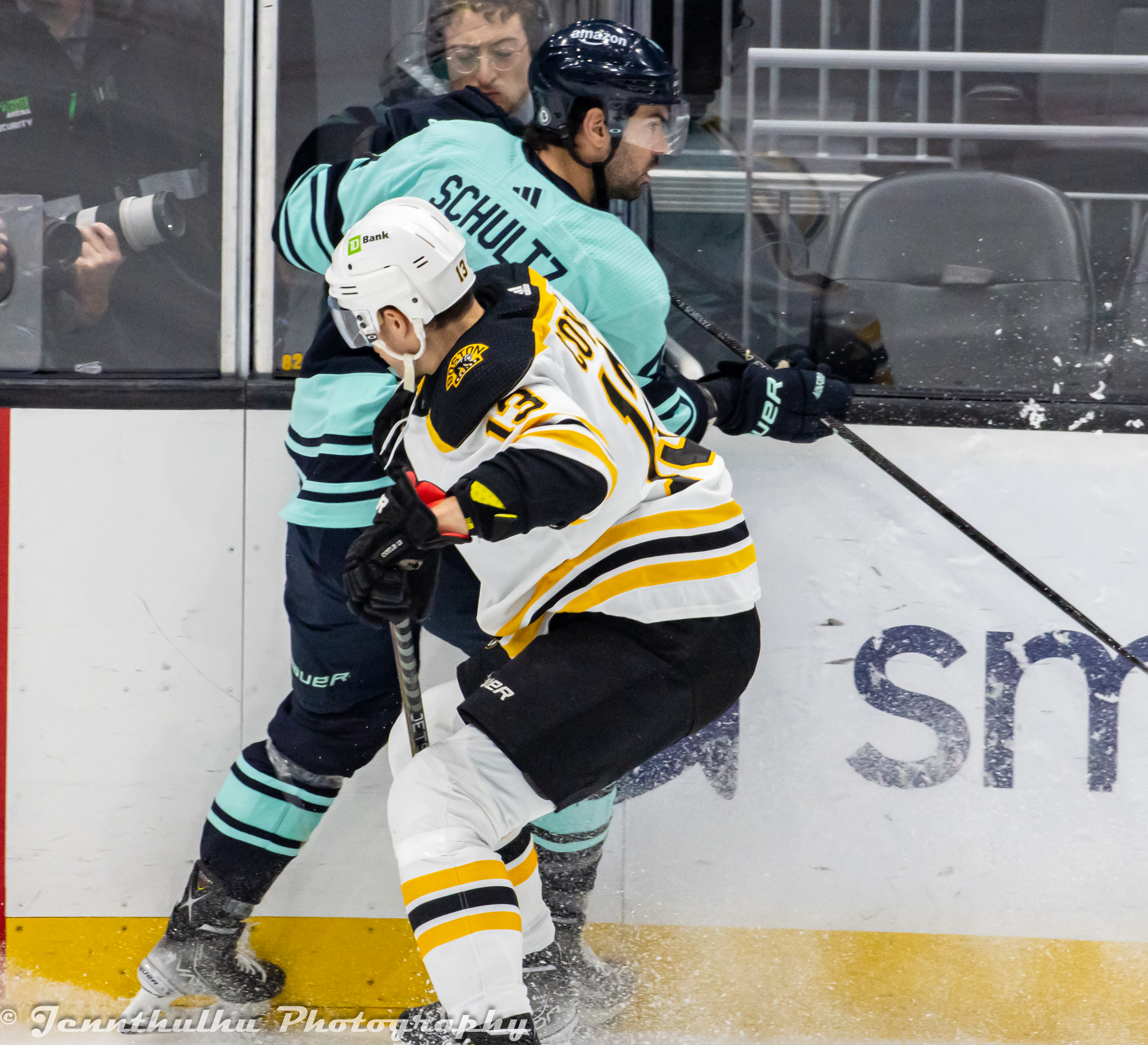
Coyle checking Seattle Kraken defenseman Justin Schultz during a game in 2023.

On February 20, 2019, Coyle was traded to the Boston Bruins in exchange for Ryan Donato and a 2019 fifth-round pick. Although Coyle initially struggled with the Bruins, totaling 2 goals and 4 assists playing 21 regular season games, he was able to find consistency in time for the 2019 playoffs, centering the Bruins' third line along with Marcus Johansson and Danton Heinen, scoring 9 goals and 16 points in 24 games. The Bruins would advance to the 2019 Stanley Cup Finals, ultimately losing to the St. Louis Blues in seven games. He finished the playoffs with nine goals and seven assists.

On February 1, 2020, in his return to Minnesota with the Bruins, Coyle was named one of the Alternate Captains of the Bruins. In late 2019, Coyle had signed a six year, $31.5 million contract extension with the Bruins through 2026.

After the retirement of longtime Bruins centers Patrice Bergeron and David Krejčí, Coyle was expected to take on a larger role on the Bruins roster as a top center. He handled this responsibility very well, having a career year with the team that saw him score a career high 25 goals as well as a career high 60 points. On November 9, 2023, Coyle recorded his first career NHL hat-trick in a 5-2 win over the New York Islanders.

Heading into 2024–25, Coyle was hoping to build off his career year, and become a threatening 1-2 center punch with new Bruins signing Elias Lindholm. However, Coyle, as well as the rest of the Bruins team, would struggle offensively, as he only scored one goal in his first 12 games of the season. Heading into December, he had only scored six goals and an assist. However, his production steadily improved in December. He scored two goals in the Bruins Centennial Game against the Montreal Canadiens, and scored five goals and two assists in the month, almost doubling his point total. However, although Coyle provided serviceable offense, the Bruins would struggle into the new year, making him a attractive trade piece.

==== Colorado Avalanche ====
On March 7, 2025, the Bruins traded Coyle and a 2026 fifth-round pick to the Colorado Avalanche in exchange for Casey Mittelstadt, Will Zellers and the Carolina Hurricanes' 2025 second-round pick. Coyle found offensive spark with the Avalanche, scoring two goals and eleven assists through 19 regular season games. Entering the postseason entrenched as the Avalanche's third-line center, Coyle scored one goal in game one of the first round of the Stanley Cup Playoffs in a seven game series defeat to the Dallas Stars.

==== Columbus Blue Jackets ====
With a year remaining on his contract, Coyle's brief tenure with the Avalanche ended just three months later approaching the 2025 NHL entry draft, as he was traded alongside Miles Wood to the Columbus Blue Jackets in exchange for prospect Gavin Brindley, a 2025 second round pick and a 2027 third-round selection on June 27, 2025. Charlie played in his 1,000th career NHL game on January 22, 2026 vs the Dallas Stars. He contributed 20 goals and 58 points; despite an resurgence in his production, his club missed the playoffs for the first time in his career.

On May 12, 2026, Coyle signed a six-year, $36 million extension with the Blue Jackets.

== Personal life ==
Coyle is the cousin of two former NHL players – Tony Amonte and Bobby Sheehan. He is close friends with former Minnesota Wild teammate Jason Zucker.

In August 2021, Coyle proposed to his long-time girlfriend Danielle Hooper, former 2013 Miss Minnesota USA, and they got married in August 2022.

== Career statistics ==
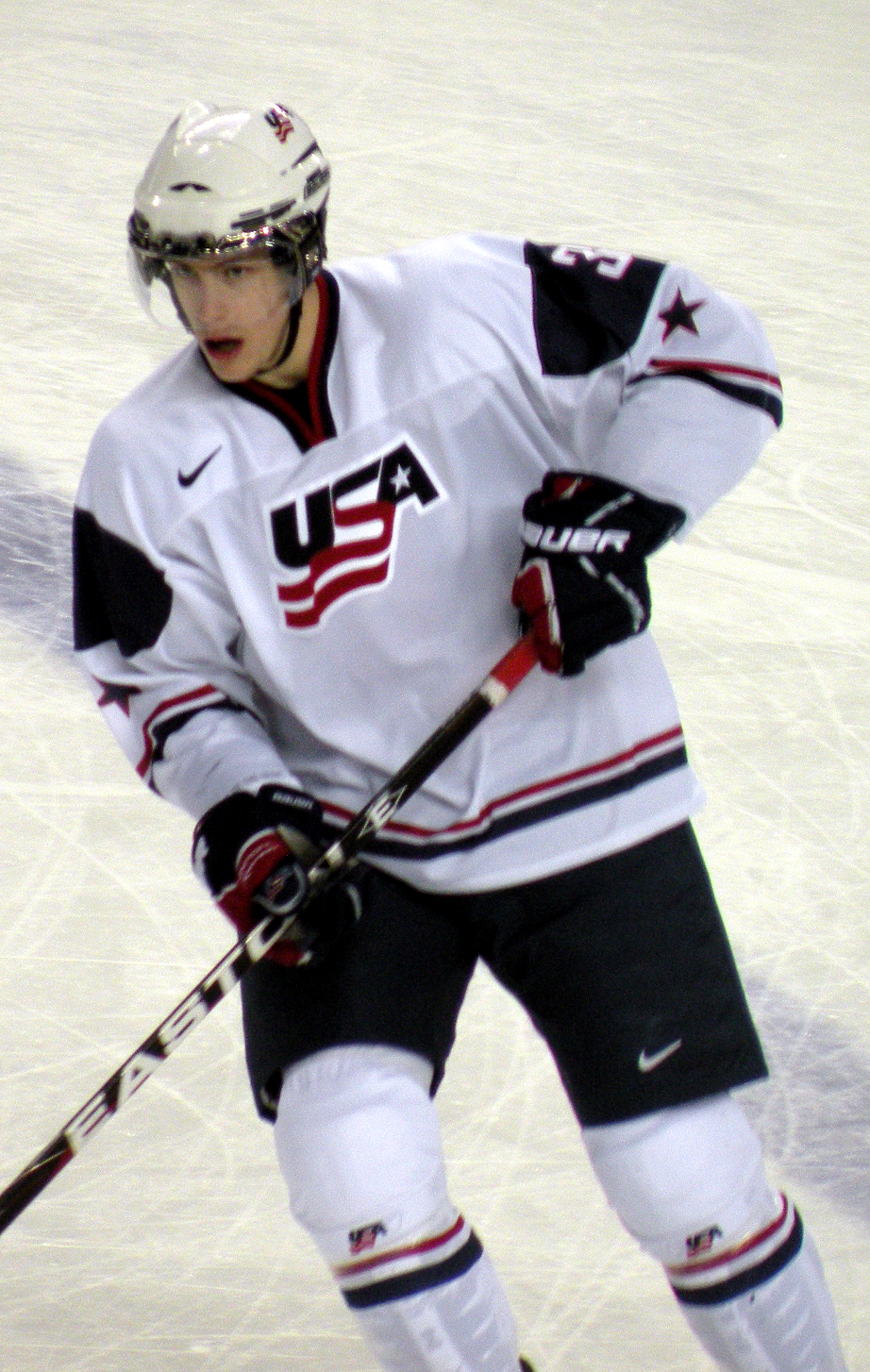

Medal record

Representing the United States

Men's ice hockey

World Championships
Bronze medal – third place	2015 Czech Republic	

World Junior Championships
Bronze medal – third place	2011 United States	

=== Regular season and playoffs ===
			Regular season					Playoffs
Season	Team	League	GP	G	A	Pts	PIM	GP	G	A	Pts	PIM
2007–08	Thayer Academy	HS-Prep	27	7	9	16	—	—	—	—	—	—
2008–09	Thayer Academy	HS-Prep	27	18	19	37	—	—	—	—	—	—
2009–10	U.S. NTDP U18	USDP	4	1	0	1	2	—	—	—	—	—
2009–10	South Shore Kings	EJHL	47	23	49	72	54	4	2	1	3	0
2010–11	Boston University	HE	37	7	19	26	34	—	—	—	—	—
2011–12	Boston University	HE	16	3	11	14	20	—	—	—	—	—
2011–12	Saint John Sea Dogs	QMJHL	23	15	23	38	8	17	15	19	34	8
2012–13	Houston Aeros	AHL	47	14	11	25	22	—	—	—	—	—
2012–13	Minnesota Wild	NHL	37	8	6	14	28	5	0	2	2	2
2013–14	Minnesota Wild	NHL	70	12	18	30	33	13	3	4	7	6
2014–15	Minnesota Wild	NHL	82	11	24	35	39	10	1	1	2	0
2015–16	Minnesota Wild	NHL	82	21	21	42	16	6	1	1	2	6
2016–17	Minnesota Wild	NHL	82	18	38	56	36	5	2	0	2	2
2017–18	Minnesota Wild	NHL	66	11	26	37	18	5	0	0	0	2
2018–19	Minnesota Wild	NHL	60	10	18	28	16	—	—	—	—	—
2018–19	Boston Bruins	NHL	21	2	4	6	4	24	9	7	16	12
2019–20	Boston Bruins	NHL	70	16	21	37	21	13	3	2	5	2
2020–21	Boston Bruins	NHL	51	6	10	16	20	11	2	1	3	6
2021–22	Boston Bruins	NHL	82	16	28	44	32	7	2	4	6	2
2022–23	Boston Bruins	NHL	82	16	29	45	30	7	1	1	2	4
2023–24	Boston Bruins	NHL	82	25	35	60	38	13	1	4	5	12
2024–25	Boston Bruins	NHL	64	15	7	22	18	—	—	—	—	—
2024–25	Colorado Avalanche	NHL	19	2	11	13	6	7	1	0	1	2
2025–26	Columbus Blue Jackets	NHL	82	20	38	58	14	—	—	—	—	—
NHL totals			1,032	209	334	543	369	126	26	27	53	58

=== International ===
Year	Team	Event	Result	GP	G	A	Pts	PIM
2011	United States	WJC	3rd place, bronze medalist(s)	6	2	4	6	4
2012	United States	WJC	7th	6	3	1	5	2
2015	United States	WC	3rd place, bronze medalist(s)	5	3	2	5	6
Junior totals				12	6	5	11	6
Senior totals				5	3	2	5	6

== Awards and honors ==
Award	Year	Ref
EJHL
Rookie of the Year	2010	
College
Hockey East Rookie of the Year	2011	
Hockey East All-Rookie Team	2011	
QMJHL
President's Cup champion	2012	
Guy Lafleur Trophy	2012	
International
World Junior Championship top 3 player on team	2011	
Boston Bruins
Seventh Player Award	2020	
John P. Bucyk Award	2021	
Eddie Shore Award	2023	

Awards and achievements
Preceded by Stéphane Da Costa	Hockey East Rookie of the Year; 2010–11	Succeeded by Scott Wilson
Preceded by Nick Petrecki	San Jose Sharks first-round draft pick 2010	Succeeded by Tomáš Hertl
