= Casey Mittelstadt =

American ice hockey player (born 1998)

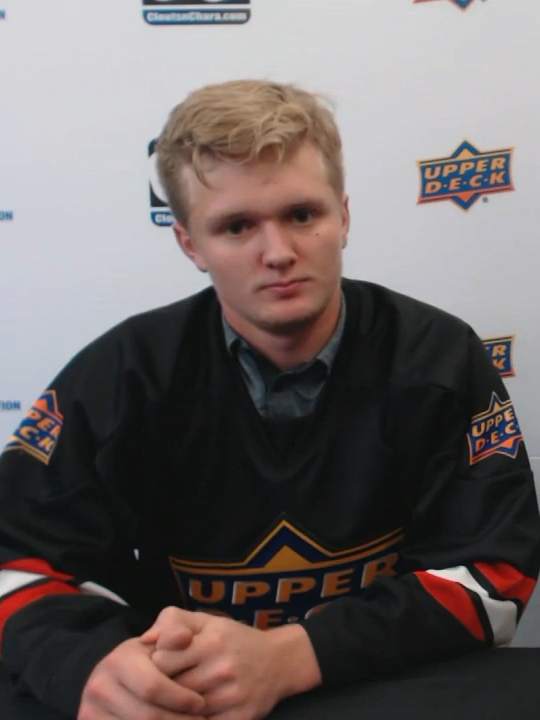
- Mittelstadt in 2018
- Born: November 22, 1998 (age 27) Edina, Minnesota, U.S.
- Height: 6 ft 1 in (185 cm)
- Weight: 205 lb (93 kg; 14 st 9 lb)
- Position: Center
- Shoots: Left
- NHL team Former teams: Boston Bruins; Buffalo Sabres; Colorado Avalanche
- NHL draft: 8th overall, 2017; Buffalo Sabres
- Playing career: 2018–present

Casey Mittelstadt (born November 22, 1998) is an American professional ice hockey player who is a center for the Boston Bruins of the National Hockey League (NHL). He was selected in the first round, eighth overall, by the Buffalo Sabres in the 2017 NHL entry draft.

== Playing career ==
=== Amateur ===
Mittelstadt was born in Edina, Minnesota, but grew up in nearby Eden Prairie. He attended Eden Prairie High School and was chosen as ALL-USA Boys Hockey Player of the Year in 2016 and 2017. He was likewise named Mr. Hockey, the best high school senior hockey player in the state of Minnesota, for 2017. He was drafted in the first round, eighth overall, by the Buffalo Sabres in the 2017 NHL entry draft.

=== Collegiate ===
Having committed to a collegiate career, Mittelstadt played as a freshman forward during the 2017–18 season for the Minnesota Golden Gophers of the National Collegiate Athletic Association (NCAA). After ranking second on the team, and seventh among all NCAA freshmen with 30 points, Mittelstadt was named to the Big Ten All-Freshman Team. He was also selected as a finalist for Freshman of the Year, along with Quinn Hughes and Mitchell Lewandowski, with the award ultimately going to Lewandowski.

=== Professional ===
==== Buffalo Sabres ====
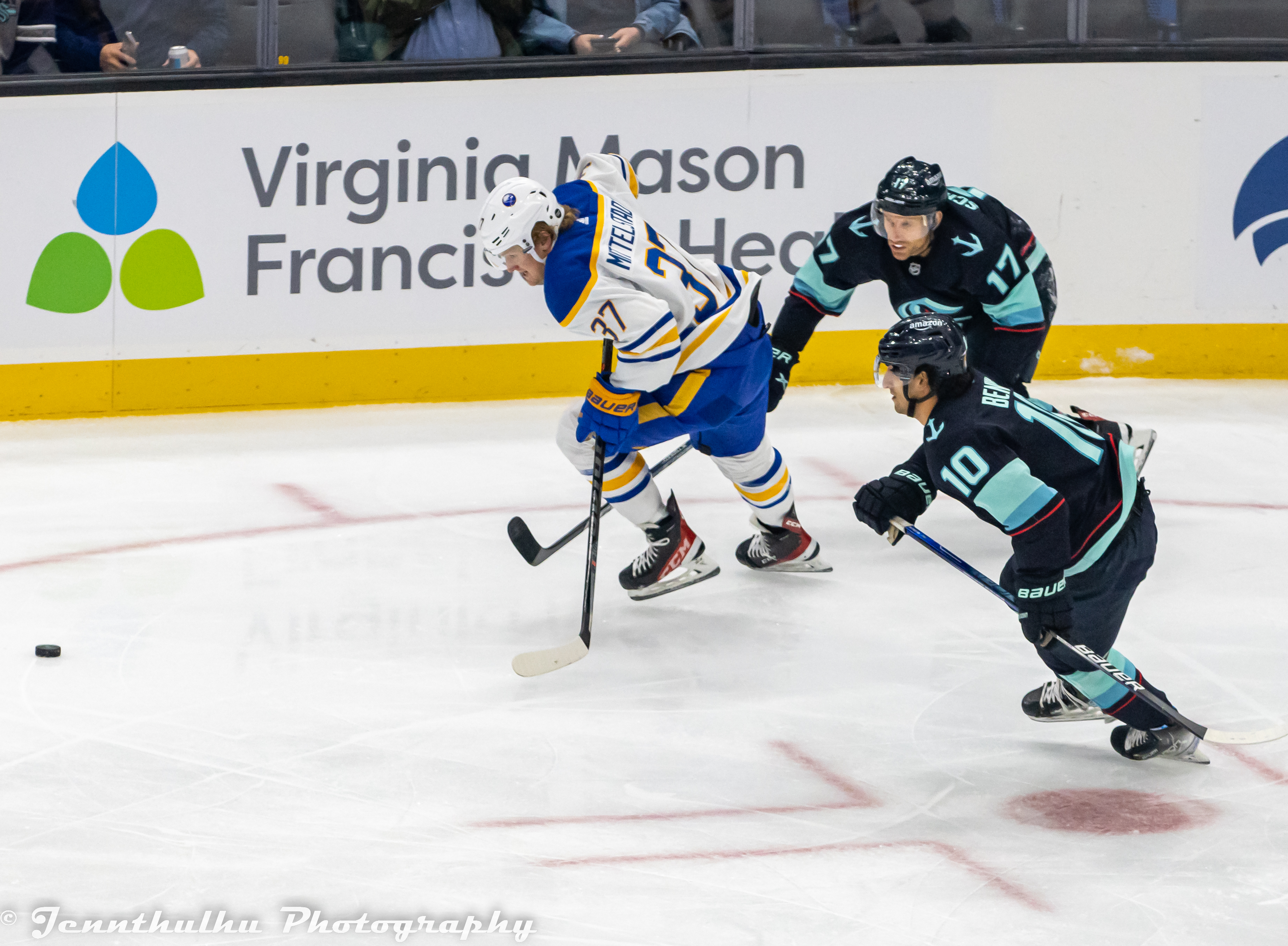
Mittelstadt going after the puck in a game against the Seattle Kraken in 2022.

On March 26, 2018, Mittelstadt opted to leave the college ranks and was signed to a three-year, entry-level contract by the Buffalo Sabres. He made his NHL debut on March 29, in a game against the Detroit Red Wings, recording an assist. He recorded his first career NHL goal on April 6, in a 7–5 loss to the Tampa Bay Lightning.

Rather than assign him to the American Hockey League (AHL), Buffalo management opted to have Mittelstadt play the entire 2018–19 season with the team. He struggled throughout the year, recording just 12 goals and 13 assists for 25 points in 77 games.

After struggling again to start the 2019–20 season, Mittelstadt was assigned to the Rochester Americans, the Sabres' AHL affiliate, on December 15, 2019.

On December 23, 2020, Mittelstadt signed a one-year contract with the Sabres.

On September 2, 2021, Mittelstadt signed a three-year, $7.5 million contract with the Sabres.

In the final year of his contract with the Sabres in the 2023–24 season, Mittelstadt was deployed as the Sabres top line two-way centre and responded in leading the club with in scoring with 33 assists and 47 points through 62 regular season games.

==== Colorado Avalanche ====
With the Sabres outside playoff contention, Mittelstadt's seven year tenure ended after he was traded to the Colorado Avalanche in exchange for defenseman Bowen Byram on March 6, 2024. Acquired to assume second-line center duties behind Nathan MacKinnon, he made his debut two days later for the Avalanche in a 2-1 overtime victory over the Minnesota Wild on March 8, 2024. He registered his first goal in the following game for the Avalanche in a 6–2 victory over the Calgary Flames on March 12, 2024. Adding needed depth to the Avalanche center position, Mittelstadt completed the regular season with 10 points through 18 games.

Qualifying for the Stanley Cup playoffs for the first time in his career, Mittelstadt made his post-season debut in the opening round game against the Winnipeg Jets and scored his first playoff goal in a high-scoring 7–6 defeat on April 21, 2024. In 11 Playoff games, Mittelstadt registered 9 points with all 9 of his playoff points coming at even-strength, to tying him with Mikko Rantanen for the team-lead in that category.

After the Avalanche's second-round defeat to the Dallas Stars, Mittelstadt as a restricted free agent was later re-signed by Colorado to a three-year, $17.25 million contract extension on June 26, 2024.

==== Boston Bruins ====
On March 7, 2025, Mittelstadt along with Will Zellers and the Carolina Hurricanes' second-round pick in the 2025 NHL entry draft were traded to the Boston Bruins in exchange for Charlie Coyle and a fifth-round pick in the 2026 NHL entry draft.

Playing a larger role on a struggling Bruins team, Mittelstadt immediately found the score sheet as a Bruin, scoring an assist in his first game against the Tampa Bay Lightning on March 8. He would follow up with three points in his first three games as a Bruin, including his first goal in the Black and Gold on March 13 against the Ottawa Senators. Mittelstadt would finish the season with 15 goals and 25 assists in 81 games split between the Avalanche and Bruins.

== International play ==
Medal record

Representing United States

Ice hockey

World Junior Championships
Bronze medal – third place	2018 United States	

IIHF World U18 Championship
Bronze medal – third place	2016 United States	

Mittelstadt played for the United States junior team in the 2018 World Junior Ice Hockey Championships. He helped lead the team to win bronze with a tournament-high 11 points, and was selected as the tournament's Best Forward. A fan favorite, Mittelstadt was named to the tournament all-star team, and received the title of Tournament MVP by media.

== Personal life ==
Mittelstadt has two younger brothers, John and Luke, who both play collegiately for the University of Minnesota of the National Collegiate Athletic Association (NCAA), with the latter being a seventh round selection of the Montreal Canadiens in the 2023 NHL entry draft.

== Career statistics ==
=== Regular season and playoffs ===
			Regular season					Playoffs
Season	Team	League	GP	G	A	Pts	PIM	GP	G	A	Pts	PIM
2014–15	Eden Prairie High School	LC	25	22	25	47	12	2	2	1	3	0
2015–16	Eden Prairie High School	LC	25	22	37	59	16	3	6	3	9	0
2015–16	U.S. National Development Team	USHL	2	2	0	2	2	—	—	—	—	—
2016–17	Eden Prairie High School	LC	25	21	43	64	8	2	1	4	5	0
2016–17	Green Bay Gamblers	USHL	24	13	17	30	2	—	—	—	—	—
2017–18	University of Minnesota	B1G	34	11	19	30	10	—	—	—	—	—
2017–18	Buffalo Sabres	NHL	6	1	4	5	2	—	—	—	—	—
2018–19	Buffalo Sabres	NHL	77	12	13	25	10	—	—	—	—	—
2019–20	Buffalo Sabres	NHL	31	4	5	9	2	—	—	—	—	—
2019–20	Rochester Americans	AHL	36	9	16	25	6	—	—	—	—	—
2020–21	Buffalo Sabres	NHL	41	10	12	22	10	—	—	—	—	—
2021–22	Buffalo Sabres	NHL	40	6	13	19	4	—	—	—	—	—
2022–23	Buffalo Sabres	NHL	82	15	44	59	22	—	—	—	—	—
2023–24	Buffalo Sabres	NHL	62	14	33	47	28	—	—	—	—	—
2023–24	Colorado Avalanche	NHL	18	4	6	10	4	11	3	6	9	2
2024–25	Colorado Avalanche	NHL	63	11	23	34	20	—	—	—	—	—
2024–25	Boston Bruins	NHL	18	4	2	6	4	—	—	—	—	—
2025–26	Boston Bruins	NHL	71	15	27	42	12	6	0	2	2	0
NHL totals			509	96	182	278	118	17	3	8	11	2

=== International ===
Year	Team	Event	Result	GP	G	A	Pts	PIM
2016	United States	WJC18	3rd place, bronze medalist(s)	7	4	5	9	2
2016	United States	IH18	2nd place, silver medalist(s)	4	3	4	7	4
2018	United States	WJC	3rd place, bronze medalist(s)	7	4	7	11	2
Junior totals				18	11	16	27	8

== Awards and honors ==
Award	Year	Ref
College
All-Big Ten Freshman Team	2018	
International
World Juniors Most Valuable Player	2018	
World Juniors Best Forward	2018	
World Juniors All-Star team	2018	

Awards and achievements
Preceded by Alexander Nylander	Buffalo Sabres first-round draft pick 2017	Succeeded by Rasmus Dahlin
