= Mason West =

American ice hockey player (born 2007)

- Born: August 3, 2007 (age 19) Edina, Minnesota, U.S.
- Height: 6 ft 6 in (198 cm)
- Weight: 215 lb (98 kg; 15 st 5 lb)
- Position: Center
- Shoots: Right
- NCAA team: Michigan State Spartans
- NHL draft: 29th overall, 2025; Chicago Blackhawks

Mason West (born August 3, 2007) is an American college ice hockey player who is a center for the Michigan State Spartans of the National Collegiate Athletic Association (NCAA). He was drafted 29th overall by the Chicago Blackhawks in the 2025 NHL entry draft.

== Playing career ==
West was a two-sport athlete, playing both football and ice hockey at Edina High School in Minnesota. During his junior year in 2024, he completed 178 of 244 passes for 2,592 yards, with 37 touchdowns and four interceptions. In his senior year, He led the Edina High School Football Team, the Hornets, to a 42–35 win over Moorhead in the Minnesota 6A state championship game in 2025. In three seasons of ice hockey, he recorded 51 goals and 63 assists in 91 games. He returned to high school and played football his senior year, leading the Hornets to their first state championship in over 50 years, but chose to forgo playing ice hockey for Edina.

During the 2024–25 season, in his draft-eligible year, West recorded one goal and eight assists in 10 games for the Fargo Force. On June 23, 2025, he committed to play college ice hockey at Michigan State. On June 27, he was drafted 29th overall by the Chicago Blackhawks in the 2025 NHL entry draft.

== Personal life ==
West was born on August 3, 2007, in Edina, Minnesota, to Mike and Julie West. He grew up in a supportive family environment alongside two older siblings, Mitchell and Maddie. His father, Mike, originally from Illinois, raised West as a fan of Chicago sports teams, including the Chicago Blackhawks and the Chicago Bears of the National Football League (NFL). During his youth, West was a multi-sport athlete, excelling in both ice hockey and football at Edina High School. Throughout his high school athletic career and decision to commit to ice hockey, West received mentorship from fellow Edina alumnus and NHL veteran Anders Lee.

== Career statistics ==
			Regular season					Playoffs
Season	Team	League	GP	G	A	Pts	PIM	GP	G	A	Pts	PIM
2022–23	Edina High School	LC	30	9	18	27	10	—	—	—	—	—
2023–24	Edina High School	LC	30	15	23	38	12	—	—	—	—	—
2024–25	Edina High School	LC	31	27	22	49	10	6	7	4	11	0
2024–25	Fargo Force	USHL	10	1	8	9	6	2	0	0	0	0
2025–26	Fargo Force	USHL	38	10	15	25	12	9	2	4	6	6
USHL totals			48	11	21	33	18	11	2	4	6	6

Awards and achievements
Preceded by Václav Nestrašil	Chicago Blackhawks first-round draft pick 2025	Succeeded by Incumbent
