= ImOn Communications =

American telecom company

- Type: Subsidiary
- Industry: Telecommunications
- Founded: March 9, 2007; 19 years ago, in Cedar Rapids, Iowa, U.S.
- Headquarters: Cedar Rapids, IA, United States
- Key people: Patrice Carroll (CEO)
- Products: Telephony
- Parent: Goldman Sachs Asset Management
- Website: www.imon.net

ImOn Communications is an American telecommunications company headquartered in Cedar Rapids, Iowa. The company operates high-speed fiber-to-the-premises Internet, telephone, and digital cable services to residential and business customers in several Iowa cities, with plans to expand into the Duluth–Superior metropolitan area of Minnesota and Wisconsin by the end of 2026.

== History ==
The company was founded in 2006 by Jeffrey Benjamin and Stephen Gray as JB and SG Communications, for the purpose of buying the ATS division of McLeodUSA as that company prepared for its initial public offering. The ATS division, at that time, consisted of a network providing cable television, telephone, and Internet services to residential customers in the area of Cedar Rapids and Marion, Iowa. JB and SG Communications announced on December 14, 2006, that it would operate under the trade name ImOn Communications, and its offer to purchase the McLeodUSA ATS division was approved by the Iowa Utilities Board a few days later. The sale was completed on March 9, 2007, which ImOn considers its date of founding.

During the 2008 Cedar River flood, much of ImOn's infrastructure was damaged or destroyed. The company assisted local businesses in restoring their service after the flood, thereby entering the business telecommunications market for the first time. In 2011, ImOn became the first company in the Cedar Rapids area to offer fiber-to-the-premises service.

In 2015, ImOn expanded into its first market outside the Cedar Rapids area, building a fiber network in Iowa City. Mediacom, which had signed an exclusive agreement to provide all cable services within Iowa City, sued ImOn and the city government for allegedly colluding to violate the terms of that agreement. The case was brought before the United States Court of Appeals for the Eighth Circuit, which ruled in ImOn's favor in 2018, on the grounds that fiber service was separate from cable service, and Mediacom still retained exclusive control of the latter.

ImOn Communications was acquired by the Infrastructure investing division of Goldman Sachs Asset Management in 2022, with ImOn CEO Patrice Carroll saying that Goldman Sachs "will be a great partner to help us implement our ambitious growth plans". ImOn retains its local headquarters and leadership in Cedar Rapids, but its continued expansion is financed by Goldman Sachs' resources.

In January 2023, ImOn acquired FiberComm of Sioux City, Iowa. The next month, ImOn purchased the fiber division of Dubuque-based Comelec Services, taking over that company's fiber services in Dubuque, Asbury, Peosta, Epworth, Farley, and Dyersville, Iowa.

In 2024, ImOn began construction of fiber networks in Marshalltown and the Clinton–Camanche area. In 2025, the company expanded its gigabit fiber services into the Southeast Iowa cities of Burlington–West Burlington, Keokuk, Fort Madison, and Mount Pleasant. In 2026, the company is installing its first fiber network outside Iowa, in Duluth, Minnesota, and Superior, Wisconsin.

The company owns the naming rights to two sports venues in Iowa, the ImOn Arena in Dubuque and the ImOn Ice Arena in Cedar Rapids.
