= Ivan Ryabkin =

Russian ice hockey player (born 2007)

- Born: 25 April 2007 (age 19) Balakovo, Russia
- Height: 5 ft 11 in (180 cm)
- Weight: 185 lb (84 kg; 13 st 3 lb)
- Position: Center
- Shoots: Left
- NHL team (P) Cur. team Former teams: Carolina Hurricanes; Chicago Wolves (AHL); Dynamo Moscow
- NHL draft: 62nd overall, 2025; Carolina Hurricanes
- Playing career: 2024–present

Ivan Ryabkin (born 25 April 2007) is a Russian junior ice hockey player who is a center for the Chicago Wolves of the American Hockey League (AHL) while under contract to the Carolina Hurricanes of the National Hockey League (NHL). He was drafted in the second round, 62nd overall, by the Hurricanes in the 2025 NHL entry draft.

== Playing career ==
In the 2023–24 season, Ryabkin played for MHC Dynamo Moscow in the Russian Junior Hockey League (MHL) as a 16-year-old. He recorded 24 goals and 58 points in 44 games over the course of the year, and added six points in five playoff games.

He made his professional debut in the Kontinental Hockey League to start the 2024–25 season with HC Dynamo Moscow, going scoreless through 2 appearances. In order to pursue his North American ambitions, Ryabkin joined junior club Muskegon Lumberjacks of the United States Hockey League (USHL) after terminating his contract with Dynamo Moscow. He received a three-game suspension for a slew-foot January 4, 2025. He completed the season, featuring amongst the Lumberjacks top scorers in posting a point-per-game pace with 19 goals and 30 points through 27 games.

Ryabkin was ranked and considered as one of the top Russian prospects eligible for the 2025 NHL entry draft. Following his selection in the second round by the Carolina Hurricanes, Ryabkin was later signed to a three-year, entry-level contract on 27 August 2025. Ryabkin started the 2025–26 season with the Chicago Wolves, the Hurricanes' AHL affiliate, before being loaned the Charlottetown Islanders of the QMJHL in January 2026; he was reassigned to the Chicago Wolves in April 2026.

== Career statistics ==
			Regular season					Playoffs
Season	Team	League	GP	G	A	Pts	PIM	GP	G	A	Pts	PIM
2023–24	MHC Dynamo Moscow	MHL	44	24	34	58	40	5	1	5	6	6
2024–25	MHC Dynamo Moscow	MHL	15	1	11	12	26	—	—	—	—	—
2024–25	Dynamo Moscow	KHL	2	0	0	0	0	—	—	—	—	—
2024–25	Dynamo St. Petersburg	VHL	8	0	2	2	6	—	—	—	—	—
2024–25	Muskegon Lumberjacks	USHL	27	19	11	30	70	14	7	9	16	30
2025–26	Charlottetown Islanders	QMJHL	20	13	29	42	44	6	4	5	9	20
2025–26	Chicago Wolves	AHL	31	1	9	10	60	21	4	5	9	10
KHL totals			2	0	0	0	0	—	—	—	—	—
