= Will Zellers =

American ice hockey player (born 2006)

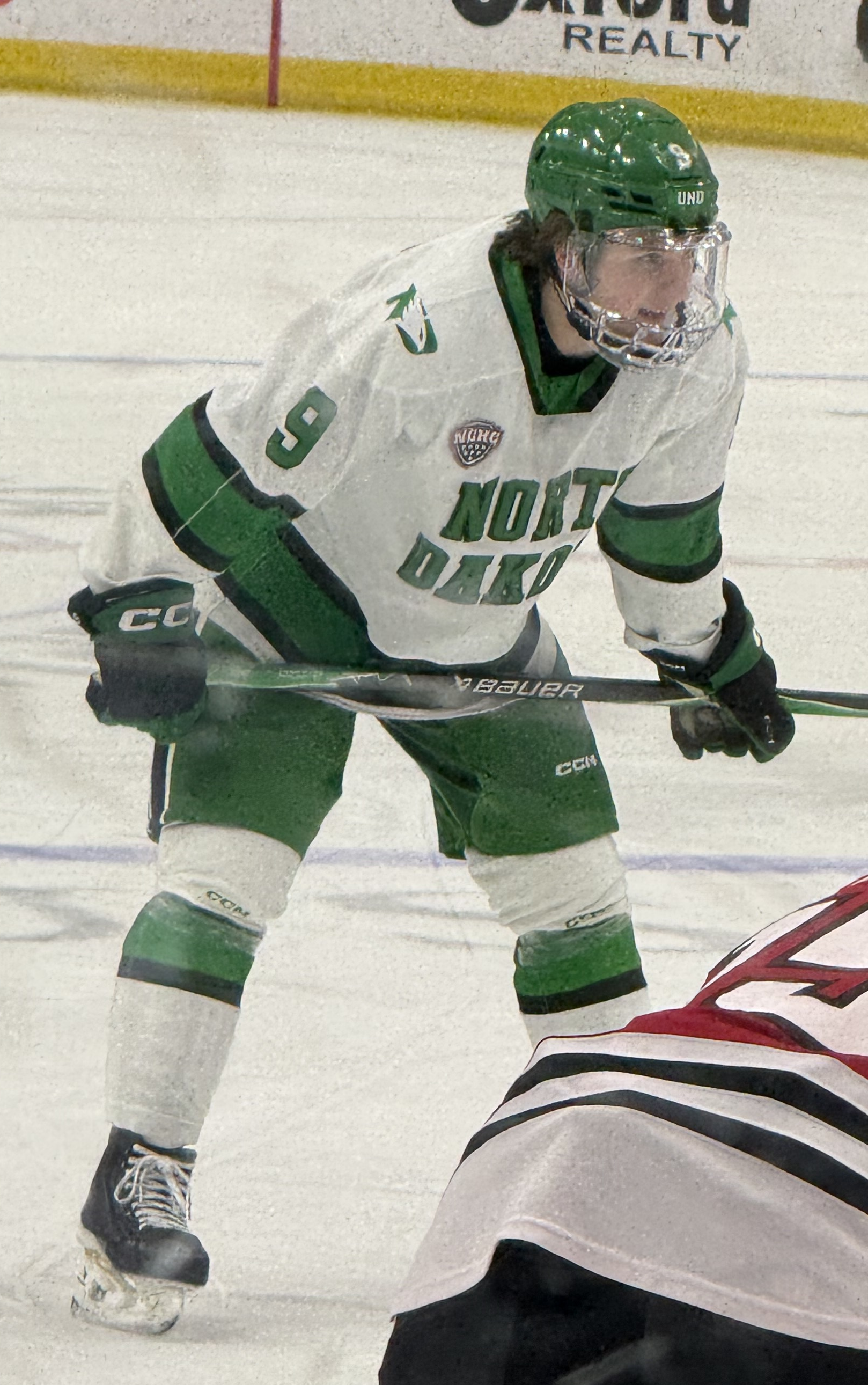
- Zellers with North Dakota in 2026
- Born: April 4, 2006 (age 20) Maple Grove, Minnesota, U.S.
- Height: 5 ft 10 in (178 cm)
- Weight: 176 lb (80 kg; 12 st 8 lb)
- Position: Forward
- Shoots: Left
- NCAA team: North Dakota
- NHL draft: 76th overall, 2024; Colorado Avalanche

William Zellers (born April 4, 2006) is an American college ice hockey forward for the University of North Dakota of the National Collegiate Athletic Association (NCAA). He was drafted 76th overall in the third round of the 2024 NHL entry draft by the Colorado Avalanche of the National Hockey League (NHL), and his signing rights currently belong to the Boston Bruins following a trade.

== Playing career ==
=== Amateur ===
After playing high school hockey at Shattuck-Saint Mary's, Zellers started playing for the Green Bay Gamblers of the United States Hockey League (USHL) full-time starting in 2024–25. Despite losing the beginning of the season due to injury, Zellers impressed in his first full season in the USHL, leading the league in goals, with 44, and being third in the league with 71 overall points. His 44 goals were also the most in a single season in the Gamblers franchise history. His efforts led him to being named the USHL Player of the Year and USHL Forward of the Year, as well as to the All-USHL First Team.

Before playing for the Gamblers, Zellers was drafted 76th overall, in the third round of the 2024 NHL entry draft by the Colorado Avalanche. On March 7, 2025, Zellers' signing rights were traded, along with Casey Mittelstadt and a second-round pick in the 2025 NHL entry draft, to the Boston Bruins in exchange for Charlie Coyle and a 2026 fifth-round pick.

=== Collegiate ===
Zellers committed to play college ice hockey at Boston University in 2023; however, he later reopened his recruitment and committed to University of North Dakota starting in the 2025–26 season.

Zellers continued to score in his freshman season, scoring 18 goals and 16 assists for 34 points in 38 games. His 18 goals were good for second-best on the team, and his 34 points were good for fourth-best on the team. This would help the Fighting Hawks to the #4 overall ranking in the NCAA and the top seed in the NCHC Tournament. Although Zellers wouldn't play Game 1 of a three-game series against Omaha in the first round, he returned in Game 2 and scored a goal and two assists to help North Dakota advance. Although Zellers and the Fighting Hawks would lose to Minnesota Duluth in the next round, they were given an at-large bid in the NCAA tournament. Zellers would help lead the Fighting Hawks to the Frozen Four, scoring two assists in both victories against Merrimack and Quinnipiac. However, Zellers' and North Dakota's season would end in there, as a 2-1 loss to Wisconsin would end their run.

In November 2026, it was reported that Zellers turned down a roster spot with the U.S. Collegiate Selects at the 2026 Spengler Cup to remain with North Dakota while the team will likely be missing a number of players to the 2027 World Junior Ice Hockey Championships.

== Personal life ==
Zellers grew up a fan of North Dakota, going to games there as a kid, influencing his decision to commit there after decommitting from Boston University. He cites former Fighting Hawks and NHLers Zach Parise and Brock Boeser as his idols.

Will's father, Kurt Zellers, is a former Minnesota politician who served as Speaker of the Minnesota House of Representatives from 2011 to 2013, and minority leader from 2009 to 2011.

== International play ==
Medal record

Ice hockey

Representing United States

Hlinka Gretzky Cup
Bronze medal – third place	2023 Czechia/Slovakia	

World Junior A Challenge
Gold medal – first place	2024 Camrose	

Zellers represents the United States at the international stage, and has had success, both personally and as a team, in multiple tournaments at the junior level. He helped the U.S. to a bronze medal at the 2023 Hlinka Gretzky Cup, scoring five goals and two assists in seven games, with the two assists coming in the bronze medal match. He also performed at a point per game level during the 2024 World Junior A Challenge, where he helped the U.S. win the tournament, scoring two goals and three assists in five games, including two goals in the gold medal game.

On December 24, 2025, Zellers was named to the United States men's national junior ice hockey team to compete at the 2026 World Junior Ice Hockey Championships. During the tournament he led the team in scoring with five goals and three assists in five games, and was eliminated in the quarterfinals by Finland.

== Career statistics ==
=== Regular season and playoffs ===
Bold indicates led league

			Regular season					Playoffs
Season	Team	League	GP	G	A	Pts	PIM	GP	G	A	Pts	PIM
2022–23	Green Bay Gamblers	USHL	1	0	0	0	0	—	—	—	—	—
2024–25	Green Bay Gamblers	USHL	52	**44**	27	71	59	2	1	2	3	2
2025–26	University of North Dakota	NCHC	38	18	16	34	29	—	—	—	—	—
NCAA totals			38	18	16	34	29	—	—	—	—	—

=== International ===
Year	Team	Event	Result	GP	G	A	Pts	PIM
2023	United States	HG18	3rd place, bronze medalist(s)	5	5	2	7	8
2024	United States	WJAC	1st place, gold medalist(s)	5	2	3	5	4
2026	United States	WJC	5th	5	5	3	8	2
Junior totals				15	12	8	20	14

== Awards and honors ==
Award	Year	Ref
USHL
USHL Player of the Year	2025	
USHL Forward of the Year	2025	
USHL First All-Star Team	2025	
College
NCHC All-Rookie Team	2026	
International
IIHF World Junior Championship Top 3 Player on Team	2026	
