= Ryker Lee =

American ice hockey player (born 2006)

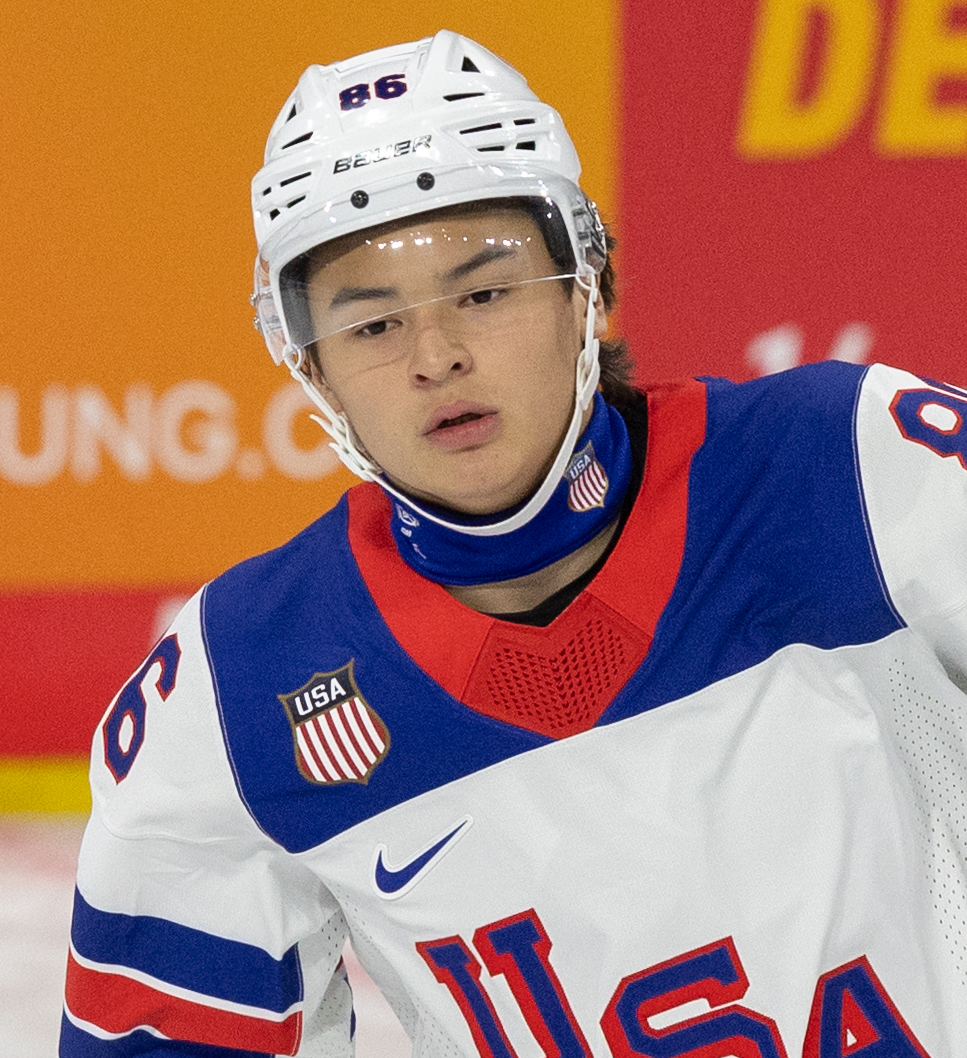
- Lee in 2026
- Born: November 8, 2006 (age 19) Wilmette, Illinois, U.S.
- Height: 6 ft 1 in (185 cm)
- Weight: 193 lb (88 kg; 13 st 11 lb)
- Position: Right wing
- Shoots: Right
- NCAA team: Michigan State University
- NHL draft: 26th overall, 2025; Nashville Predators

Ryker Lee (born November 8, 2006) is an American college ice hockey player for Michigan State University of the National Collegiate Athletic Association (NCAA). He was drafted 26th overall by the Nashville Predators in the first round of the 2025 NHL entry draft.

== Playing career ==
Lee attended high school and played four years for Shattuck-Saint Mary's. He then joined the Madison Capitols of the USHL, where he recorded one goal and one assist in two games during the 2023–24 season. During the 2024–25 season, in his draft eligible year, he led all rookies in scoring with 31 goals and 37 assists in 58 games, and he helped the Capitols reach the second round of the playoffs. Following the season he was named the USHL Rookie of the Year. Lee was also named MVP in the 2025 Chipotle All-American Game, which features the top 40 American draft-eligible prospects. On June 27, 2025, he was drafted 26th overall by the Nashville Predators in the first round of the 2025 NHL entry draft.

== International play ==
On December 24 2025, Lee was named to the United States men's national junior ice hockey team to compete at the 2026 World Junior Ice Hockey Championships. During the tournament he recorded two goals and one assist in five games, and was eliminated in the quarterfinals by Finland.

== Career statistics ==
=== Regular season and playoffs ===
			Regular season					Playoffs
Season	Team	League	GP	G	A	Pts	PIM	GP	G	A	Pts	PIM
2023–24	Madison Capitols	USHL	2	1	1	2	0	—	—	—	—	—
2024–25	Madison Capitols	USHL	58	31	37	68	18	—	—	—	—	—
2025–26	Michigan State University	B1G	35	15	15	30	26	—	—	—	—	—
NCAA totals			35	15	15	30	26	—	—	—	—	—

=== International ===
Year	Team	Event	Result	GP	G	A	Pts	PIM
2023	United States	IH18	2nd place, silver medalist(s)	5	0	1	1	2
2024	United States	WJAC	1st place, gold medalist(s)	3	0	1	1	2
2026	United States	WJC	5th	5	2	1	3	2
Junior totals				13	2	3	5	6

Awards and achievements
Preceded by Cameron Reid	Nashville Predators first-round draft pick 2025	Succeeded by Wyatt Cullen
