= Young Arena =

Multi-propose arena in Waterloo, Iowa, United States

Coordinates: 42°29′56″N 92°20′37″W

- Location within Iowa Location within the United States
- Location: 125 Commercial Street; Waterloo, IA 50701
- Owner: City of Waterloo
- Operator: City of Waterloo
- Capacity: 3,500 (ice hockey)
- Public transit: 6 7 MET Transit

Construction
- Opened: December 1994
- Cost: $4.3 million ($9.34 million in 2025 dollars)
- Architect: Thorson–Brom–Broshar–Snyder
- General contractor: Gardner Construction

Tenant
- Waterloo Black Hawks (USHL) (1994–present)

Young Arena is a 3,000-seat multi-purpose arena in Waterloo, Iowa, United States, and was built in 1994. It is home to the Waterloo Black Hawks of the United States Hockey League, the Waterloo Warriors of the Midwest High School Hockey League, the Waterloo Youth Hockey Association, the University of Northern Iowa Hockey Club, the Waterloo Adult Hockey Association and the Cedar Valley Figure Skating Club. Young Arena has also hosted the NCAA Division III wrestling championships, AAU and USA youth wrestling tournaments and a college basketball game in December 1997 between UNI and UMKC.
