= Václav Nestrašil =

Czech ice hockey player (born 2007)

- Born: 6 April 2007 (age 19) Prague, Czech Republic
- Height: 6 ft 5 in (196 cm)
- Weight: 187 lb (85 kg; 13 st 5 lb)
- Position: Right wing
- Shoots: Right
- NCAA team: UMass Minutemen
- NHL draft: 25th overall, 2025; Chicago Blackhawks

Václav Nestrašil (born 6 April 2007) is a Czech ice hockey player who is a right winger for the UMass Minutemen of the National Collegiate Athletic Association (NCAA). He was drafted 25th overall by the Chicago Blackhawks in the 2025 NHL entry draft.

== Playing career ==
During the 2024–25 season, in his draft-eligible year, Nestrašil recorded 19 goals and 23 assists in 61 regular season games. During the playoffs he recorded seven goals and six assists in 14 games to help the Muskegon Lumberjacks win their first Clark Cup in franchise history. On 27 June 27, 2025, Nestrašil was drafted 25th overall by the Chicago Blackhawks in the 2025 NHL entry draft.

He is committed to play college ice hockey at the University of Massachusetts Amherst.

== International play ==
Medal record

Men's ice hockey

Representing the Czech Republic

World Junior Championships
Silver medal – second place	2026 United States	

Nestrašil represented the Czech Republic junior team at the 2026 World Junior Championships where he recorded two goals and six assists in seven games and won a silver medal.

== Personal life ==
Nestrašil was born to Lucy and Vaclav Nestrašil, and has four brothers, Andrej, Viktor, Boris, and Dan. His older brothers, Andrej and Viktor, are both professional ice hockey player.

== Career statistics ==
			Regular season					Playoffs
Season	Team	League	GP	G	A	Pts	PIM	GP	G	A	Pts	PIM
2023–24	Muskegon Lumberjacks	USHL	11	0	0	0	4	—	—	—	—	—
2024–25	Muskegon Lumberjacks	USHL	61	19	23	42	51	14	7	6	13	8
2025–26	UMass-Amherst	HE	34	13	18	31	8	—	—	—	—	—
NCAA totals			34	13	18	31	8	—	—	—	—	—

=== International ===
Year	Team	Event	Result	GP	G	A	Pts	PIM
2023	Czechia	U17	4th	7	4	1	5	0
2026	Czechia	WJC	2nd place, silver medalist(s)	7	2	6	8	6
Junior totals				14	6	7	13	6

Awards and achievements
Preceded by Anton Frondell	Chicago Blackhawks first-round draft pick 2025	Succeeded by Mason West
