= ImOn Arena =

Ice arena in Dubuque, Iowa

- Location within Iowa Location within the United States
- Full name: ImOn Arena
- Location: Dubuque, Iowa
- Coordinates: 42.513°N 90.649°W
- Owner: City of Dubuque
- Operator: Q Casino (DICE)
- Capacity: 3200
- Surface: Ice
- Public transit: Pink The Jule

Construction
- Groundbreaking: November 2, 2009
- Opened: September 18, 2010
- Cost: $7.1 million ($10.5 million in 2025 dollars)
- Architects: Larrison & Associates

Tenants
- Dubuque Youth Hockey; Dubuque Saints HS Hockey; University of Wisconsin-Platteville Hockey (ACHA); Dubuque Fighting Saints (USHL); University of Dubuque Hockey

Website
- https://schmittisland.com/ice-arena

ImOn Arena, formerly known as the Mystique Ice Center and Dubuque Ice Arena, is a 3,200-seat, single-sheet ice rink and event space that serves the City of Dubuque and surrounding communities in Iowa, as well as nearby communities in Wisconsin and Illinois.

It is a top-loading facility with additional amenities including concessions on both the concourse and ground levels, luxury boxes on one side, three press boxes on the other, 8 restrooms, a lounge with full bar, conference room and lower level meeting room. Skates are available for rental for public skate sessions, there is a skate sharpener on site, and small skating accessories concession. Parking is available next to the building (125 spaces) and another 1500 spaces are across the street near the baseball fields. Additional parking is available at the Q Casino.

The arena is home to the 5-time Clark Cup Champion Dubuque Fighting Saints of the USHL. Owned by the City of Dubuque and operated by Schmitt Island Development Corp., the facility is Dubuque's first dedicated ice arena. The center plays host to youth and adult hockey, public skate, figure skating, and other ice activities. It is home to Dubuque Youth Hockey, the Dubuque Saints (High School Hockey), University of Dubuque men's and women's NCAA D3 hockey teams, and the University of Wisconsin-Platteville Hockey Team (ACHA).

In 2022 the arena underwent major renovations to fix foundation issues to the cost of about $6 million.

The naming rights to the arena are currently held by telecom provider ImOn Communications, which paid $500,000 for the rights in 2023, in an agreement currently set to run until 2028.
