= Waterloo Black Hawks =

American junior ice hockey team

- City: Waterloo, Iowa
- League: United States Hockey League
- Conference: Western
- Founded: 1962
- Home arena: Young Arena
- Colors: Black, red, white
- General manager: Vacant
- Head coach: Scott Gordon
- Media: KCNZ, Waterloo-Cedar Falls Courier, KWWL

Franchise history
- First Franchise
- 1962–1969: Waterloo Black Hawks
- 1969–1970: Iowa Stars
- 1970–1980: Waterloo Black Hawks
- 1980–2001: Dubuque Fighting Saints
- Second Franchise
- 1978–1979: Anoka Nordiques
- 1979–1980: Hennepin Nordiques
- 1980–present: Waterloo Black Hawks

Championships
- Regular season titles: 3 Anderson Cups (2007, 2014, 2018)
- Division titles: 3 (1980, 2003, 2008)
- Conference titles: 1 (2014)
- Playoff championships: 1 Clark Cup (2004)

The Waterloo Black Hawks are a junior ice hockey team playing in the Western Conference of the United States Hockey League (USHL). The Black Hawks' home ice is the Young Arena in Waterloo, Iowa.

== History ==
=== Early history ===
The Waterloo Black Hawks began as a semi-professional senior team in the United States Hockey League (USHL) in 1962. The league had been renamed prior to the season after beginning in 1948 as the American Amateur Hockey League. The team's home ice was the McElroy Auditorium. The team won the USHL championship consecutively between the seasons of 1964 and 1968 under "Player/Coach" Bud McRae. After the 1968–69 season, the Black Hawks went on a one-year hiatus to become the Minnesota North Stars' top farm team, the Iowa Stars. The Stars finished 35–26–11 in 1969–70, one point behind league champion Omaha (whom the Stars would later lose to in the Central Professional Hockey League final series).

=== Early junior history ===
After league titles in 1978, and 1979 in a hybrid junior-senior format, the Black Hawks converted to junior hockey with the rest of the USHL in 1979–80. They won the Southern Division title in 1979–80 before head coach Jack Barzee moved the team to Dubuque the next season, becoming the Fighting Saints in the process. The Hennepin Nordiques then moved to Waterloo before the 1980–81 campaign. The "new" Black Hawks retained the history, logos, and arena of the old team.

Following the retirement of head coach Scott Mikesch in 1980, the team went through eight different head coaches from 1980 to 1992. Five of them coached between 1980 and 1982. After the team's Southern Division title in 1980, the Black Hawks did not have a winning season again until 1993–94, winning 20 games (in a 48-game season) four times during that span.

=== 1990s ===
The Black Hawks turned out several future National Hockey League (NHL) players in the early 1990s. Twin leading forwards Chris Ferraro and Peter Ferraro came over from Dubuque midway through the 1991–92 season and scored a combined 200 points from their time that year in Waterloo and Dubuque. Two seasons later, Jason Blake had 50 goals and 50 assists, the first 50-goal, 50-assist player in the USHL since Thunder Bay's Terry Menard seven years prior.

In 1994, the Black Hawks moved out of the old McElroy Auditorium into the new Young Arena in downtown Waterloo. New owner Butch Johnson's purchased the team in 1997. The records did not improve, and the team failed to finish above .500 again until the 1999–2000 season. New head coach Scott Pionk in 1997–98 had a 25–29–2 record, but a 16–37–3 record the next season led to his departure. Scott Koberinski had a 28–26–4 record in 1999–2000, followed by a 25–29–2 record the next year, but a 21–38–2 record in 2001–02 led to another coaching change.

=== 2002–2020 ===
New coach P.K. O'Handley brought immediate changes to the Black Hawks in 2002–03 and Waterloo won their first division championship in 23 years with a 38–17–5 record and finishing two points behind the Lincoln Stars in the Anderson Cup standings. The next season brought the Hawks' first USHL Clark Cup championship win, and the first league title of any kind since 1979, despite finishing fourth in the Eastern Division. The Black Hawks also won the Anderson Cup regular season title in 2006–07, their first regular season title for the Black Hawks in the junior era. The team was one game away from winning the 2007 Clark Cup before they were beaten 3–0 by the Sioux Falls Stampede in the championship game. The made it to the 2008 Clark Cup Finals, but lost 4–3 to the Omaha Lancers in overtime in the final game of the series. Waterloo was also defeated in a five-game finals series by the Green Bay Gamblers in 2012 and once more in 2014 by the Indiana Ice. However, the Hawks did win additional Anderson Cups in 2013–14 and 2017–18.

Of the 31 Black Hawks alumni who have gone on to appear in the NHL, 22 played for O'Handley, including Joe Pavelski, Vinnie Hinostroza, and Brock Boeser. In the 2019 NHL entry draft, forwards Vladislav Firstov (42nd) and Matej Blumel (100th) were drafted to the Minnesota Wild and the Edmonton Oilers, respectively.

The Black Hawks won the USHL Organization of the Year award for the 2002–03, 2004–05, and 2006–07 seasons. At the time, the USHL said of the Black Hawks in 2007, "Once a franchise in a state of disarray, the Waterloo Black Hawks are now among the teams that sets the standard for how a team should be run." P.K. O'Handley also won Coach of the Year honors for the 2002–03, 2006–07, 2013–14, and 2017–18 seasons and the General Manager of Year award for the 2002–03, 2011–12, 2017–18 seasons.

=== 2021–present ===
P.K. O'Handley stepped down from his coaching position after the 2020–21 season to focus on the off-ice aspects of operating the team. The Black Hawks hired former NHL player Matt Smaby as head coach beginning with the 2021–22 season. As of 2024, O'Handley has entered a Senior Consultant role with the team. This leaves Joe Greene, who joined the team in June 2015 as Vice President and was promoted in March 2023, as sole President and Chief Operating Officer of the team. Under Greene's leadership the Black Hawks were awarded Business of the Year (1-50 employees) by Grow Cedar Valley also in March 2023. 2022–23 USHL General Manager of the Year Bryn Chyzyk left the team on March 8, 2025 to return to his alma mater, North Dakota, to serve as an assistant coach and general manager for their men's ice hockey program.

== Rivalries ==
The Black Hawks have ongoing rivalries with the Cedar Rapids RoughRiders, Des Moines Buccaneers. and the Dubuque Fighting Saints. In 2010, the USHL saw the renewal of the rivalry between Dubuque, Cedar Rapids, Des Moines, and Waterloo. Waterloo participates in a four team head-to-head regular season competition known as the Dupaco Cowbell Cup.

== Notable alumni ==
=== Former Black Hawks in professional hockey ===
Among the Black Hawks alumni in the National Hockey League:

- Andrew Alberts
- Mikey Anderson
- Jason Blake
- Brock Boeser
- J. T. Brown
- Mark Eaton
- Chris Ferraro
- Mark Friedman
- Eriah Hayes
- Vinnie Hinostroza
- Ian McCoshen
- Brandon Montour
- Joe Pavelski
- Cal Petersen
- Zach Sanford
- Craig Smith
- Patrick Wey
- Derek Whitmore

=== Former Black Hawks in other sports ===
- Michael Annett NASCAR (Most Improved Player and member of Championship team in 2004)
