= United States men's national junior ice hockey team =

United States
- Nickname: Team USA
- Association: USA Hockey
- General manager: John Vanbiesbrouck
- Head coach: Adam Nightingale
- Assistants: Dan Bylsma; Tom Ward; Jared DeMichiel
- Captain: Brodie Ziemer
- Top scorer: Jeremy Roenick (13)
- Most points: Jordan Schroeder & Trevor Zegras (27)
- Team colors
- IIHF code: USA
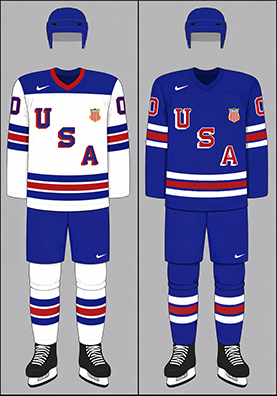

First international
- Canada 5–4 United States (Leningrad, Soviet Union; December 27, 1973)

Biggest win
- United States 19–1 Norway (Regina, Canada; January 1, 1991)

Biggest defeat
- Sweden 11–1 United States (Leningrad, Soviet Union; December 29, 1973); Soviet Union 15–5 United States (Banská Bystrica, Czechoslovakia; December 30, 1976); Czechoslovakia 11–1 United States (Moscow, Soviet Union; December 31, 1987)

IIHF World Junior Championship
- Appearances: 50 (first in 1977)
- Best result: Gold: 7 (2004, 2010, 2013, 2017, 2021, 2024, 2025)

International record (W–L–T)
- 183-141-11

Medal record

World Junior Championship
Gold medal – first place	2004 Finland	Team
Gold medal – first place	2010 Canada	Team
Gold medal – first place	2013 Russia	Team
Gold medal – first place	2017 Canada	Team
Gold medal – first place	2021 Canada	Team
Gold medal – first place	2024 Sweden	Team
Gold medal – first place	2025 Canada	Team
Silver medal – second place	1997 Switzerland	Team
Silver medal – second place	2019 Canada	Team
Bronze medal – third place	1986 Canada	Team
Bronze medal – third place	1992 Germany	Team
Bronze medal – third place	2007 Sweden	Team
Bronze medal – third place	2011 United States	Team
Bronze medal – third place	2016 Finland	Team
Bronze medal – third place	2018 United States	Team
Bronze medal – third place	2023 Canada	Team

The United States men's national junior ice hockey team represents the United States at the IIHF World Junior Championship.

The team has won the World Junior Championships seven times. (2004, 2010, 2013, 2017, 2021, 2024, 2025). Many NHL prospects, including John Carlson, Jack Eichel, Auston Matthews, Patrick Kane, Zach Parise, Adam Fox and Matthew Tkachuk, played on the national junior team.

== Competitive record ==
=== IIHF World Junior Championship ===
Record book data:

Note: 1974, 1975 and 1976 tournaments are considered unofficial. They are not included in the IIHF records.

Year	Result	Rank	GP	W	OTW	OTL	L	GF	GA	Pts
(Soviet Union) 1974	Round-robin	5th place	5	1	0	0	4	10	32	2
(Canada) / (United States) 1975	Round-robin	6th place	5	0	0	0	5	9	28	0
(Finland) 1976	Did not participate									
(Czechoslovakia) 1977	Round-robin	7th place	7	1	0	0	5	25	45	3
(Canada) 1978	Preliminary round	5th place	6	4	0	0	2	41	30	8
(Sweden) 1979	Preliminary round	6th place	5	2	0	0	3	21	23	4
(Finland) 1980	Preliminary round	7th place	5	1	0	0	3	21	26	3
(West Germany) 1981	Preliminary round	6th place	5	2	0	0	3	19	27	4
(United States) / (Canada) 1982	Round-robin	6th place	7	2	0	0	5	28	34	4
(Soviet Union) 1983	Round-robin	5th place	7	3	0	0	4	28	29	6
(Sweden) 1984	Round-robin	6th place	7	2	0	0	5	32	38	4
(Finland) 1985	Round-robin	6th place	7	2	0	0	5	23	37	4
(Canada) 1986	Third place	3rd place, bronze medalist(s)	7	4	0	0	3	35	26	8
(Czechoslovakia) 1987	Semifinals	4th place	7	4	0	0	3	42	30	8
(Soviet Union) 1988	Round-robin	6th place	7	1	0	0	6	28	46	2
(United States) 1989	Round-robin	5th place	7	3	0	0	3	41	25	7
(Finland) 1990	Round-robin	7th place	7	1	0	0	6	22	37	2
(Canada) 1991	Semifinals	4th place	7	4	0	0	2	45	19	9
(Germany) 1992	Third place	3rd place, bronze medalist(s)	7	5	0	0	2	30	22	10
(Sweden) 1993	Round-robin	4th place	7	4	0	0	3	32	23	8
(Czech Republic) 1994	Round-robin	6th place	7	1	0	0	5	20	33	3
(Canada) 1995	Round-robin	5th place	7	3	0	0	4	28	33	6
(United States) 1996	Quarterfinals	5th place	6	3	0	0	3	21	27	6
(Switzerland) 1997	Runner-up	2nd place, silver medalist(s)	6	4	0	0	1	23	9	9
(Finland) 1998	Quarterfinals	5th place	7	4	0	0	3	25	19	8
(Canada) 1999	Preliminary round	8th place	7	3	0	0	4	28	29	6
(Sweden) 2000	Semifinals	4th place	7	2	0	1	2	14	12	6
(Russia) 2001	Quarterfinals	5th place	7	5	0	0	2	29	12	10
(Czech Republic) 2002	Quarterfinals	5th place	7	3	1	0	1	22	20	10
(Canada) 2003	Semifinals	4th place	7	4	0	0	3	23	17	8
(Finland) 2004	Champions	1st place, gold medalist(s)	6	6	0	0	0	27	8	12
(United States) 2005	Semifinals	4th place	7	3	0	1	3	27	28	6
(Canada) 2006	Semifinals	4th place	7	3	0	0	3	26	22	7
(Sweden) 2007	Third place	3rd place, bronze medalist(s)	7	3	1	2	1	22	17	13
(Czech Republic) 2008	Semifinals	4th place	6	4	0	0	2	20	16	12
(Canada) 2009	Quarterfinals	5th place	5	3	0	0	2	31	17	9
(Canada) 2010	Champions	1st place, gold medalist(s)	7	5	1	1	0	43	18	18
(United States) 2011	Third place	3rd place, bronze medalist(s)	6	4	1	0	1	20	10	14
(Canada) 2012	Preliminary round	7th place	6	3	0	0	3	30	18	9
(Russia) 2013	Champions	1st place, gold medalist(s)	7	5	0	0	2	34	9	15
(Sweden) 2014	Quarterfinals	5th place	5	3	0	0	2	24	12	9
(Canada) 2015	Quarterfinals	5th place	5	2	1	0	2	16	9	8
(Finland) 2016	Third place	3rd place, bronze medalist(s)	7	5	0	0	2	34	10	15
(Canada) 2017	Champions	1st place, gold medalist(s)	7	5	2	0	0	29	15	19
(United States) 2018	Third place	3rd place, bronze medalist(s)	7	4	1	0	2	35	19	14
(Canada) 2019	Runner-up	2nd place, silver medalist(s)	7	5	0	1	1	25	14	16
(Czech Republic) 2020	Quarterfinals	6th place	5	2	1	0	2	17	14	8
(Canada) 2021	Champions	1st place, gold medalist(s)	7	6	0	0	1	36	10	18
(Canada) 2022	Quarterfinals	5th place	5	4	0	0	1	24	8	12
(Canada) 2023	Third place	3rd place, bronze medalist(s)	7	4	1	0	2	40	25	14
(Sweden) 2024	Champions	1st place, gold medalist(s)	7	6	1	0	0	45	15	20
(Canada) 2025	Champions	1st place, gold medalist(s)	7	5	1	1	0	37	16	18
(United States) 2026	Quarterfinals	5th place	5	3	0	1	1	20	19	10
Total	7 Titles	52/53	335	171	12	8	133	1427	1137	464

== Team ==
Roster for the 2026 World Junior Ice Hockey Championships.

Head coach: Bob Motzko

Pos.	No.	Name	Height	Weight	Birthdate	Hometown	2024–25 Team	NHL rights, if any
D	2	Luke Osburn	6 ft 1 in	189 lb	September 9, 2006	Plymouth, Michigan	(United States) University of Wisconsin (Big Ten)	Buffalo Sabres
F	4	Teddy Stiga — A	5 ft 11 in	178 lb	April 5, 2006	Sudbury, Massachusetts	(United States) Boston College (HEA)	Nashville Predators
D	5	Logan Hensler	6 ft 2 in	198 lb	October 14, 2006	Woodbury, Minnesota	(United States) University of Wisconsin (Big Ten)	Ottawa Senators
D	6	Adam Kleber	6 ft 5 in	210 lb	March 24, 2006	Chaska, Minnesota	(United States) University of Minnesota Duluth (NCHC)	Buffalo Sabres
D	7	Dakoda Rheaume-Mullen	6 ft 1 in	188 lb	December 18, 2006	Northville, Michigan	(United States) University of Michigan (Big Ten)	Undrafted
F	8	A. J. Spellacy	6 ft 3 in	205 lb	February 24, 2006	Westlake, Ohio	(Canada) Windsor Spitfires (OHL)	Chicago Blackhawks
F	10	James Hagens — A	5 ft 11 in	193 lb	November 3, 2006	(New York (state)) Hauppauge, New York	(United States) Boston College (HEA)	Boston Bruins
F	11	Cole McKinney	6 ft 1 in	198 lb	March 16, 2007	Lake Forest, Illinois	(United States) University of Michigan (Big Ten)	San Jose Sharks
F	12	Will Zellers	6 ft 0 in	180 lb	April 4, 2006	Maple Grove, Minnesota	(United States) University of North Dakota (NCHC)	Boston Bruins
D	14	Asher Barnett	6 ft 1 in	197 lb	May 16, 2007	Wilmette, Illinois	(United States) University of Michigan (Big Ten)	Edmonton Oilers
D	16	E. J. Emery	6 ft 3 in	185 lb	March 30, 2006	Compton, California	(United States) University of North Dakota (NCHC)	New York Rangers
F	17	Ryker Lee	6 ft 1 in	185 lb	November 8, 2006	Wilmette, Illinois	(United States) Michigan State University (Big Ten)	Nashville Predators
F	18	L. J. Mooney	5 ft 8 in	165 lb	March 2, 2007	West Mifflin, Pennsylvania	(United States) University of Minnesota (Big Ten)	Montreal Canadiens
F	22	Brendan McMorrow	5 ft 11 in	180 lb	March 27, 2006	Lakeville, Minnesota	(United States) University of Denver (NCHC)	Los Angeles Kings
F	23	Shane Vansaghi	6 ft 2 in	215 lb	October 11, 2006	St. Louis, Missouri	(United States) Michigan State University (Big Ten)	Philadelphia Flyers
F	24	Will Horcoff	6 ft 5 in	201 lb	January 23, 2007	Birmingham, Michigan	(United States) University of Michigan (Big Ten)	Pittsburgh Penguins
D	25	Chase Reid	6 ft 2 in	185 lb	December 30, 2007	Chesterfield Michigan	(Canada) Sault Ste. Marie Greyhounds (OHL)	2026 NHL Draft
F	26	Max Plante — A	5 ft 11 in	180 lb	February 20, 2006	Hermantown, Minnesota	(United States) University of Minnesota Duluth (NCHC)	Detroit Red Wings
G	30	Caleb Heil	6 ft 2 in	196 lb	June 19, 2006	Victoria, Minnesota	(United States) Madison Capitols (USHL)	Tampa Bay Lightning
G	31	Nicholas Kempf	6 ft 2 in	196 lb	March 1, 2006	Morton Grove, Illinois	(United States) University of Notre Dame (Big Ten)	Washington Capitals
F	34	Cole Eiserman	6 ft 0 in	189 lb	August 29, 2006	Newburyport, Massachusetts	(United States) Boston University (HEA)	New York Islanders
G	35	Brady Knowling	6 ft 5 in	203 lb	March 9, 2008	Chicago, Illinois	(United States) USA Hockey NTDP (USHL)	2026 NHL Draft
F	38	Kamil Bednarik	6 ft 1 in	185 lb	May 26, 2006	Elmhurst, Illinois	(United States) Boston University (HEA)	New York Islanders
D	44	Cole Hutson — A	5 ft 11 in	171 lb	June 28, 2006	North Barrington, Illinois	(United States) Boston University (HEA)	Washington Capitals
F	74	Brodie Ziemer — C	5 ft 11 in	195 lb	February 22, 2006	Hutchinson, Minnesota	(United States) University of Minnesota (Big Ten)	Buffalo Sabres
