= Brady Martin =

Canadian ice hockey player (born 2007)

- Born: March 16, 2007 (age 19) Elora, Ontario, Canada
- Height: 6 ft 0 in (183 cm)
- Weight: 185 lb (84 kg; 13 st 3 lb)
- Position: Centre
- Shoots: Right
- NHL team (P) Cur. team: Nashville Predators; Milwaukee Admirals (AHL)
- NHL draft: 5th overall, 2025; Nashville Predators
- Playing career: 2025–present

Brady Martin (born March 16, 2007) is a Canadian professional ice hockey centre for the Milwaukee Admirals of the American Hockey League (AHL) as a prospect for the Nashville Predators of the National Hockey League (NHL). He was selected fifth overall by the Predators in the 2025 NHL entry draft.

== Playing career ==
On April 21, 2023, Martin was drafted third overall by the Sault Ste. Marie Greyhounds in the 2023 OHL Priority Selection. On May 23, 2023, he signed with the Greyhounds. During the 2023–24 season, in his rookie season, he recorded ten goals and 18 assists in 52 regular season games. On September 27, 2024, he was named an alternate captain for the 2024–25 season. During his sophomore season, he recorded 33 goals and 39 assists in 57 regular season games. He was selected to compete in the CHL/USA Prospects Challenge and the inaugural Connor McDavid OHL Top Prospects Game.

As a top-10 rated prospect prior to the 2025 NHL entry draft, Martin became the Nashville Predators highest selection in over a decade when taken fifth overall. On August 20, 2025, Martin was signed by the Predators to a three-year, entry-level contract. On October 22, after three games in the NHL, the Predators returned Martin to the Greyhounds.

== International play ==
Medal record

Representing Canada

Ice hockey

World Junior Championships
Bronze medal – third place	2026 United States	

World U18 Championships
Gold medal – first place	2025 United States	

On October 23, 2023, he named to Canada Red's roster to compete at the 2023 World U-17 Hockey Challenge. During the tournament he recorded two goals and one assist in seven games. On July 31, 2024, he was selected to represent Canada at the 2024 Hlinka Gretzky Cup. During the tournament he recorded four assists in five games and won a gold medal.

In April 2025, he was selected to represent Canada at the 2025 IIHF World U18 Championships. During the tournament he ranked second on the team in scoring with three goals and eight assists in seven games. During the gold medal game against Sweden, he scored two goals, to help Canada win a gold medal. This marked the first time Canada has won consecutive gold medals at the IIHF World U18 Championship. He was subsequently named to the media all-star team.

In December 2025, he was selected to represent Canada at the 2026 World Junior Ice Hockey Championships. During the tournament he recorded four goals and four assists in six games and won a bronze medal.

== Personal life ==
Martin works on his family farm in Elmira, Ontario. Martin made headlines for not attending the 2025 NHL entry draft and instead having a draft party on the family farm.

== Career statistics ==
=== Regular season and playoffs ===
			Regular season					Playoffs
Season	Team	League	GP	G	A	Pts	PIM	GP	G	A	Pts	PIM
2023–24	Sault Ste. Marie Greyhounds	OHL	52	10	18	28	40	11	1	1	2	4
2024–25	Sault Ste. Marie Greyhounds	OHL	57	33	39	72	68	5	2	2	4	8
2025–26	Nashville Predators	NHL	3	0	1	1	0	—	—	—	—	—
2025–26	Sault Ste. Marie Greyhounds	OHL	24	8	16	24	37	10	3	7	10	10
2025–26	Milwaukee Admirals	AHL	—	—	—	—	—	3	1	0	1	4
NHL totals			3	0	1	1	0	—	—	—	—	—

=== International ===
Year	Team	Event	Result	GP	G	A	Pts	PIM
2023	Canada Red	U17	5th	7	2	1	3	4
2024	Canada	HG18	1st place, gold medalist(s)	5	0	4	4	2
2025	Canada	U18	1st place, gold medalist(s)	7	3	8	11	29
2026	Canada	WJC	3rd place, bronze medalist(s)	6	4	4	8	2
Junior totals				25	9	17	26	37

Awards and achievements
Preceded by Yegor Surin	Nashville Predators first-round draft pick 2025	Succeeded by Cameron Reid
