= Horcoff =

Horcoff is a surname. Notable people with the surname include:

- Shawn Horcoff (born 1978), Canadian ice hockey player
- Will Horcoff (born 2007), American ice hockey player
