= Ryan Roobroeck =

Canadian ice hockey player (born 2007)

- Born: September 25, 2007 (age 19) London, Ontario, Canada
- Height: 6 ft 3 in (191 cm)
- Weight: 209 lb (95 kg; 14 st 13 lb)
- Position: Left wing
- Shoots: Left
- OHL team Former teams: Guelph Storm; Niagara IceDogs
- NHL draft: 34th overall, 2026; Chicago Blackhawks

Ryan Roobroeck (born September 25, 2007) is a Canadian ice hockey winger for the Guelph Storm of the Ontario Hockey League (OHL). Roobroeck was selected 34th overall in the 2026 NHL entry draft by the Chicago Blackhawks.

== Playing career ==
Roobroeck was the second overall pick in the 2023 Ontario Hockey League (OHL) draft by the Niagara IceDogs. He had previously applied for exceptional player status in 2022. Roobroeck scored 28 goals and 51 points in his first season with the IceDogs. Roobroeck broke the record for most points by a rookie in IceDogs history, previously held by Akil Thomas. He was also named to the OHL first all-rookie team.

Roobroeck's strengths as a player include his size, his shot and his goal scoring ability. Areas that needed work coming into the OHL were his "compete level, skating, and engagement away from the puck."

== International play ==
Medal record

Representing Canada

Ice hockey

World U18 Championship
Gold medal – first place	2025 United States	

Roobroeck was a member of Canada's gold medal winning team at the 2025 IIHF World U18 Championships.

== Personal life ==
Roobroeck's older brother, Dylan, was selected by the IceDogs in the third round of the 2020 OHL draft. Dylan was later drafted by the New York Rangers in the sixth round of the 2023 NHL entry draft and currently plays for the Hartford Wolf Pack of the American Hockey League. They both attended Lord Dorchester Secondary School.

== Career statistics ==
=== Regular season and playoffs ===
			Regular season					Playoffs
Season	Team	League	GP	G	A	Pts	PIM	GP	G	A	Pts	PIM
2022–23	London Nationals	GOJHL	5	3	0	3	0	—	—	—	—	—
2023–24	Niagara IceDogs	OHL	63	28	23	51	14	—	—	—	—	—
2024–25	Niagara IceDogs	OHL	64	41	46	87	18	5	3	3	6	0
2025–26	Niagara IceDogs	OHL	49	30	28	58	26	—	—	—	—	—
OHL totals			176	99	97	196	58	5	3	3	6	0

=== International ===
Year	Team	Event	Result	GP	G	A	Pts	PIM
2023	Canada Red	U17	5th	7	3	1	4	10
2025	Canada	U18	1st place, gold medalist(s)	7	4	5	9	0
Junior totals				14	7	6	13	10
