= Cole Reschny =

Canadian ice hockey player (born 2007)

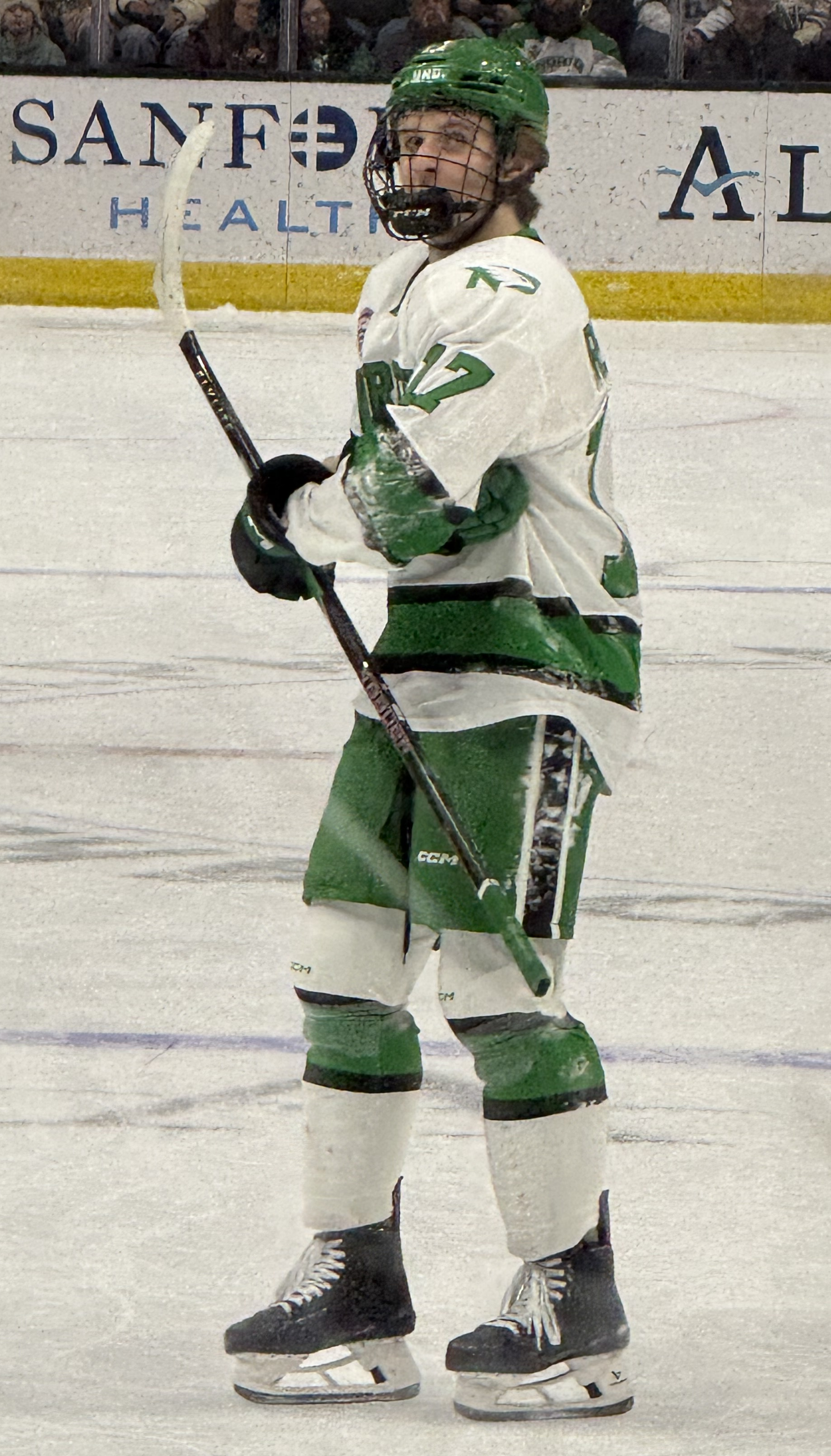
- Reschny with North Dakota in 2026
- Born: April 6, 2007 (age 19) Macklin, Saskatchewan, Canada
- Height: 5 ft 11 in (180 cm)
- Weight: 183 lb (83 kg; 13 st 1 lb)
- Position: Centre
- Shoots: Left
- NCHC team: North Dakota
- NHL draft: 18th overall, 2025; Calgary Flames

Cole Reschny (born April 6, 2007) is a Canadian college ice hockey centre and captain for the North Dakota Fighting Hawks of the National Collegiate Athletic Association (NCAA). He was drafted 18th overall by the Calgary Flames in the 2025 NHL entry draft.

== Playing career ==
Reschny was drafted third overall by the Victoria Royals in the 2022 WHL Prospects Draft. He played 4 games and scored 1 goal for the Royals in the 2022–23 season.

In his first full season in the WHL, Reschny played 61 games in 2023–24 for the Royals, scoring 21 goals and 38 assists. In the 2024-25 season, Reschny scored 26 goals and 66 assists in 62 games played in the regular season. In the playoffs, he tallied 9 goals and 16 assists in 11 games.

On May 30, 2025, Reschny verbally committed to play the 2025–26 season at the University of North Dakota alongside his Royals teammate Keaton Verhoeff.

On June 27, 2025, he was drafted 18th overall by the Calgary Flames in the 2025 NHL entry draft.

Reschny was named NCHC Rookie of the Year for the 2025–26 season on March 17, 2026.

On September 16, 2026, Reschny was voted captain of the North Dakota Fighting Hawks. He is the youngest captain in program history, and along with Dave Hakstol and Bob Murray is one of only three underclassmen to hold captaincy at UND.

== International play ==
Medal record

Representing Canada

Ice hockey

World Junior Championships
Bronze medal – third place	2026 United States	

World U18 Championships
Gold medal – first place	2025 United States	

Hlinka Gretzky Cup
Gold medal – first place	2024 Canada	

Reschny played for Canada Red at the 2023 World Under-17 Hockey Challenge, scoring three goals and five assists in seven games at the tournament.

He represented Canada at the 2024 Hlinka Gretzky Cup, where he scored three goals and four assists in five games and won a gold medal. He then won gold with Canada at the 2025 IIHF World U18 Championships.

In December 2025, he was selected to represent Canada at the 2026 World Junior Ice Hockey Championships. During the tournament he recorded four goals and one assist in seven games and won a bronze medal.

== Personal life ==
Reschny's older brother Austin played in the Alberta Junior Hockey League and now plays at the Southern Alberta Institute of Technology.

== Career statistics ==
=== Regular season and playoffs ===
			Regular season					Playoffs
Season	Team	League	GP	G	A	Pts	PIM	GP	G	A	Pts	PIM
2022–23	Victoria Royals	WHL	4	1	0	1	2	–	–	–	–	–
2023–24	Victoria Royals	WHL	61	21	38	59	14	4	1	1	2	6
2024–25	Victoria Royals	WHL	62	26	66	92	44	11	9	16	25	10
2025–26	University of North Dakota	NCHC	36	6	29	35	22	–	–	–	–	–
NCAA totals			36	6	29	35	22	–	–	–	–	–

=== International ===
Year	Team	Event	Result	GP	G	A	Pts	PIM
2023	Canada Red	U17	5th	7	3	5	8	4
2024	Canada	HG18	1st place, gold medalist(s)	5	3	4	7	4
2025	Canada	U18	1st place, gold medalist(s)	5	5	3	8	4
2026	Canada	WJC	3rd place, bronze medalist(s)	7	4	1	5	2
Junior totals				24	15	13	28	14

== Awards and honours ==
Award	Year
College
NCHC Rookie of the Year	2026
All-NCHC Rookie Team	2026

Awards and achievements
Preceded by Matvei Gridin	Calgary Flames first-round draft pick 2025	Succeeded by Cullen Potter
Preceded by Sacha Boisvert	NCHC Rookie of the Year; 2025–26	Succeeded by Incumbent
