= Braeden Cootes =

Canadian ice hockey player (born 2007)

- Born: February 9, 2007 (age 19) Sherwood Park, Alberta, Canada
- Height: 5 ft 11 in (180 cm)
- Weight: 183 lb (83 kg; 13 st 1 lb)
- Position: Centre
- Shoots: Right
- NHL team (P) Cur. team: Vancouver Canucks; Abbotsford Canucks (AHL)
- NHL draft: 15th overall, 2025; Vancouver Canucks
- Playing career: 2025–present

Braeden Cootes (born February 9, 2007) is a Canadian ice hockey player who is a centre for the Abbotsford Canucks of the American Hockey League (AHL) as a prospect to the Vancouver Canucks of the National Hockey League (NHL). He was drafted fifteenth overall by the Canucks in the 2025 NHL entry draft.

== Playing career ==
Cootes was captain of the Seattle Thunderbirds in 2024–25, the youngest captain in the Western Hockey League, and scored 26 goals and 37 assists in 60 games. It was speculated the Canucks would target Cootes leading up to the 2025 draft. He signed a three-year, entry-level contract with the Canucks on July 10, 2025.

On October 6, 2025, the Canucks announced that Cootes made their opening night roster. Cootes was the first 18-year old to earn a spot on Vancouver's opening night roster since Petr Nedvěd in 1990. He made his NHL debut on October 9, 2025, in a 5–1 victory over the Calgary Flames, logging 11 minutes and 14 seconds of ice time. After going pointless in three games, he was returned to the Seattle Thunderbirds on October 14, 2025. On January 6, 2026, he was traded to the Prince Albert Raiders.

== International play ==
Medal record

Representing Canada

Ice hockey

World Junior Championships
Bronze medal – third place	2026 United States	

World U18 Championships
Gold medal – first place	2025 United States	

Cootes captained Team Canada to a gold medal at the 2025 IIHF World U18 Championships, scoring six goals and 12 points in seven games.

In December 2025, he was selected to represent Canada at the 2026 World Junior Ice Hockey Championships. During the tournament he recorded two goals in seven games and won a bronze medal.

== Career statistics ==
=== Regular season and playoffs ===
			Regular season					Playoffs
Season	Team	League	GP	G	A	Pts	PIM	GP	G	A	Pts	PIM
2022–23	Seattle Thunderbirds	WHL	7	0	1	1	0	—	—	—	—	—
2023–24	Seattle Thunderbirds	WHL	64	14	21	35	16	—	—	—	—	—
2024–25	Seattle Thunderbirds	WHL	60	26	37	63	18	6	2	6	8	4
2025–26	Vancouver Canucks	NHL	3	0	0	0	0	—	—	—	—	—
2025–26	Seattle Thunderbirds	WHL	17	10	13	23	2	—	—	—	—	—
2025–26	Prince Albert Raiders	WHL	28	14	26	40	6	20	7	16	23	2
NHL totals			3	0	0	0	0	—	—	—	—	—

=== International ===
Year	Team	Event	Result	GP	G	A	Pts	PIM
2024	Canada	HG18	1st place, gold medalist(s)	3	0	1	1	27
2025	Canada	U18	1st place, gold medalist(s)	7	6	6	12	0
2026	Canada	WJC	3rd place, bronze medalist(s)	7	2	0	2	2
Junior totals				17	8	7	15	29

Awards and achievements
Preceded by Tom Willander	Vancouver Canucks first-round draft pick 2025	Succeeded by Caleb Malhotra
