= Milton Gästrin =

Swedish ice hockey player (born 2007)

- Born: 2 June 2007 (age 19) Örnsköldsvik, Sweden
- Height: 6 ft 1 in (185 cm)
- Weight: 185 lb (84 kg; 13 st 3 lb)
- Position: Centre
- Shoots: Left
- Allsvenskan team: Modo Hockey
- NHL draft: 37th overall, 2025; Washington Capitals

Milton Gästrin (born 2 June 2007) is a Swedish professional ice hockey player who is a centre for Modo Hockey of the HockeyAllsvenskan. He was selected by the Washington Capitals in the second round, 37th overall, of the 2025 NHL entry draft.

== Playing career ==
On 23 June 2026, Gästrin was traded to the St. Louis Blues along with Connor McMichael and a 2026 first-round pick in exchange for Jordan Kyrou.

== International play ==
Medal record

Men's ice hockey

Representing Sweden

World Junior Championships
Gold medal – first place	2026 United States	

World U18 Championships
Silver medal – second place	2025 United States	

Gästrin represented Sweden at the under-18 2024 Hlinka Gretzky Cup, where he won a bronze medal. Nine months later, he represented Sweden again, at the 2025 IIHF World U18 Championships, where he won the silver medal.

In December 2025, he was selected to represent Sweden at the 2026 World Junior Championships.

== Personal life ==
Gästrin's younger brother, Malcom, is also an ice hockey player. He was selected by the Edmonton Oilers in the third round of the 2026 NHL entry draft.

== Career statistics ==
=== Regular season and playoffs ===
			Regular season					Playoffs
Season	Team	League	GP	G	A	Pts	PIM	GP	G	A	Pts	PIM
2022–23	Modo Hockey	J18	17	9	14	23	2	—	—	—	—	—
2023–24	Modo Hockey	J18	4	2	4	6	0	—	—	—	—	—
2023–24	Modo Hockey	J20	41	7	9	16	8	2	0	1	1	0
2024–25	Modo Hockey	J20	40	18	24	42	18	—	—	—	—	—
2024–25	Modo Hockey	SHL	8	0	0	0	2	—	—	—	—	—
2025–26	Modo Hockey	Allsv	39	10	14	24	4	13	1	3	4	4
SHL totals			8	0	0	0	2	—	—	—	—	—
