= Radim Mrtka =

Czech ice hockey player (born 2007)

- Born: 9 June 2007 (age 19) Havlíčkův Brod, Czech Republic
- Height: 6 ft 6 in (198 cm)
- Weight: 218 lb (99 kg; 15 st 8 lb)
- Position: Defence
- Shoots: Right
- NHL team (P) Cur. team Former teams: Buffalo Sabres; Rochester Americans (AHL); Oceláři Třinec
- NHL draft: 9th overall, 2025; Buffalo Sabres
- Playing career: 2024–present

Radim Mrtka (born 9 June 2007) is a Czech professional ice hockey player who is a defenceman for the Rochester Americans of the American Hockey League (AHL) while under contract as a prospect to the Buffalo Sabres of the National Hockey League (NHL). He previously played for Oceláři Třinec of the Czech Extraliga (ELH). He was selected ninth overall by the Sabres in the 2025 NHL entry draft.

== Early life ==
Mrtka was born to Miloš and Helena in Havlíčkův Brod, Czech Republic.

== Playing career ==
Mrtka played with Oceláři Třinec of the Czech Extraliga (ELH) during the 2023–24 season. He recorded four goals and seven assists in 19 games with the under-20 team, and three goals and three assists in 17 games with the under-17 team. He was drafted 71st overall by the Seattle Thunderbirds in the 2024 CHL Import Draft.

He began the 2024–25 season with Oceláři Třinec, where he recorded one assist in 10 ELH games. On 27 November 2024, he signed with the Seattle Thunderbirds of the WHL. During the 2024–25 WHL season he recorded three goals and 32 assists in 43 regular season games for the Thunderbirds.

On 15 July 2025, Mrtka signed a three-year, entry-level contract with the Buffalo Sabres. Mrtka would spend the majority of his season once again in the WHL with the Thunderbirds. After the WHL season concluded, he joined the Sabres' American Hockey League (AHL) affiliate, the Rochester Americans, to end their season and join in their playoff run. Meanwhile, the Sabres morphed into a contending team; in March 2026, nearing the league's trade deadline, rumors surfaced that Mrtka would be part of a return package to the St. Louis Blues in order for the Sabres to acquire Colton Parayko. Parayko's contract held a clause which allowed him to block the trade, and Mrtka ultimately remained with Buffalo. Regarding the rumors, Thunderbirds head coach Matt O'Dette praised how he handled the publicity, describing him as "in a lot of ways, unflappable."

== International play ==
Medal record

Men's ice hockey

Representing the Czech Republic

World Junior Championships
Silver medal – second place	2026 United States	

In December 2025, he was selected to represent Czechia at the 2026 World Junior Championships. He was scoreless in five games and won a silver medal.

== Career statistics ==
=== Regular season and playoffs ===
			Regular season					Playoffs
Season	Team	League	GP	G	A	Pts	PIM	GP	G	A	Pts	PIM
2023–24	Oceláři Třinec	ELH	3	0	0	0	2	—	—	—	—	—
2024–25	Oceláři Třinec	ELH	10	0	1	1	0	—	—	—	—	—
2024–25	Seattle Thunderbirds	WHL	43	3	32	35	46	6	0	3	3	4
2025–26	Seattle Thunderbirds	WHL	43	1	33	34	38	5	0	3	3	2
2025–26	Rochester Americans	AHL	8	0	1	1	7	3	0	1	1	0
ELH totals			13	0	1	1	2	—	—	—	—	—

=== International ===
Year	Team	Event	Result	GP	G	A	Pts	PIM
2023	Czechia	U17	4th	8	2	2	4	2
2024	Czechia	U18	6th	5	0	0	0	31
2025	Czech Republic	U18	7th	5	1	3	4	4
2026	Czechia	WJC	2nd place, silver medalist(s)	5	0	0	0	2
Junior totals				23	3	5	8	39

Awards and achievements
Preceded by Konsta Helenius	Buffalo Sabres first-round draft pick 2025	Succeeded by Daxon Rudolph
