= Jakob Ihs-Wozniak =

Australian-Swedish ice hockey player (born 2007)

- Born: 1 February 2007 (age 19) Adelaide, Australia
- Height: 6 ft 2 in (188 cm)
- Weight: 184 lb (83 kg; 13 st 2 lb)
- Position: Centre
- Shoots: Right
- SHL team: Luleå HF
- NHL draft: 55th overall, 2025; Vegas Golden Knights
- Playing career: 2024–present

Jacob Ihs-Wozniak (born 1 February 2007) is an Australian-Swedish professional ice hockey centre for Luleå HF of the SHL. He was drafted by the Vegas Golden Knights in the second round of the 2025 NHL entry draft.

== Playing career ==
During the 2023–24 season, Ihs-Wozniak broke the record for most points by a U17 player in the J20 Nationell, scoring 50 points in 36 games.

He made his Swedish Hockey League (SHL) debut with Luleå HF in January 2024.

== International play ==
Medal record

Representing Sweden

Ice hockey

World U18 Championships
Silver medal – second place	2025 United States	
Bronze medal – third place	2024 Finland	

He represented Sweden at the 2025 IIHF World U18 Championships and won a silver medal.

== Career statistics ==
=== Regular season and playoffs ===
			Regular season					Playoffs
Season	Team	League	GP	G	A	Pts	PIM	GP	G	A	Pts	PIM
2022–23	Luleå HF	J20	1	0	0	0	0	—	—	—	—	—
2023–24	Luleå HF	J20	36	22	28	50	18	4	3	2	5	0
2023–24	Luleå HF	SHL	2	0	0	0	0	—	—	—	—	—
2024–25	Luleå HF	J20	40	23	34	57	18	3	3	1	4	2
2024–25	Luleå HF	SHL	13	1	1	2	0	2	0	0	0	0
SHL totals			15	1	1	2	0	2	0	0	0	0

=== International ===
Year	Team	Event	Result	GP	G	A	Pts	PIM
2023	Sweden	U17	3rd place, bronze medalist(s)	7	1	6	7	2
2024	Sweden	U18	3rd place, bronze medalist(s)	7	1	0	1	2
2024	Sweden	HG18	3rd place, bronze medalist(s)	5	4	0	4	2
2025	Sweden	U18	2nd place, silver medalist(s)	7	5	2	7	2
Junior totals				26	11	8	19	8

== Awards and honours ==
Award	Year
SHL
Le Mat Trophy (Luleå HF)	2025
