= William Moore (ice hockey) =

Canadian-American ice hockey player (born 2007)

- Born: March 24, 2007 (age 19) Mississauga, Ontario, Canada
- Height: 6 ft 2 in (188 cm)
- Weight: 175 lb (79 kg; 12 st 7 lb)
- Position: Center
- Shoots: Left
- NCAA team: Boston College
- NHL draft: 51st overall, 2025; Boston Bruins

William Moore (born March 24, 2007) is a Canadian-American college ice hockey player who is currently plays for the Boston College Eagles of the National Collegiate Athletic Association (NCAA). He is also a prospect of the Boston Bruins of the National Hockey League (NHL), having been selected by them 51st overall in the 2025 NHL entry draft.

== Playing career ==
=== Amateur ===
Having been born in Mississauga, Ontario, Moore spent his early amateur career playing in Canada, mainly with the Mississauga Senators of the Greater Toronto Hockey League, while also spending a season with the Toronto Marlboros in 2022-23. During this time, Moore was an offensive force, leading many to speculate he would be a top pick in the 2025 NHL entry draft once he was eligible.

Starting in the 2023-24 season, Moore would move his hockey career south of the border, joining the U.S. National Development Team despite being a first round pick of the London Knights in the 2023 Ontario Hockey League Priority Selection Draft. In 50 games with the team, Moore scored 23 goals and 20 assists. After the season, he announced that he was committing to Boston College to play college ice hockey starting in 2026-27.

=== Collegiate ===
Moore was selected by the Boston Bruins in the second round, 51st overall, of the 2025 NHL entry draft. Shortly after it was drafted, Moore announced in media availability that he planned to join Boston College a season early, starting in 2025-26.

Moore would score a goal and an assist in his first two games with the Eagles, but would struggle to find consistent offensive success thereafter. Moore would finish the season with four goals and six assists for ten points in 33 games, as the Eagles were knocked out in the semi-finals of the Hockey East tournament and failed to qualify for the NCAA tournament.

== International play ==
Medal record

Representing United States

Ice hockey

World U18 Championships
Bronze medal – third place	2025 United States	

World U-17 Hockey Challenge
Silver medal – second place	2023 Canada	

Moore led the 2023 World U-17 Hockey Challenge in scoring with five goals and seven assists, helping the U.S. to a silver medal in the tournament.

Moore also represent the U.S. at the 2025 IIHF World U18 Championships, where he led the team in scoring with three goals and eight assists, good for fifth in the tournament. His efforts would help the U.S. to a bronze medal, where he scored three assists in the bronze medal match against Slovakia.

== Personal ==
Moore holds dual Canadian-American citizenship due to his father being an American, and despite having been born in Mississauga and having played for their youth team, he grew up in Ithaca, New York.

Moore is an avid piano and violin player, and won the Little Mozart International Competition when he was just 10 years old, playing at Carnegie Hall. He played Chopin's Polonaise in G Minor.

== Career statistics ==
=== Regular season and playoffs ===
			Regular season					Playoffs
Season	Team	League	GP	G	A	Pts	PIM	GP	G	A	Pts	PIM
2023–24	U.S. National Development Team	USHL	35	14	11	25	18	—	—	—	—	—
2024–25	U.S. National Development Team	USHL	25	10	11	21	2	—	—	—	—	—
2025–26	Boston College	HE	33	4	6	10	0	—	—	—	—	—
NCAA totals			33	4	6	10	0	—	—	—	—	—

=== International ===
Bold indicates led tournament

Year	Team	Event	Result	GP	G	A	Pts	PIM
2023	United States	U17	2nd place, silver medalist(s)	7	5	**7**	**12**	2
2025	United States	U18	3rd place, bronze medalist(s)	7	3	8	11	2
Junior totals				14	8	15	23	4
