= Will Horcoff =

Canadian-American ice hockey player (born 2007)

- Horcoff with Michigan in January 2025
- Born: January 23, 2007 (age 19) Edmonton, Alberta, Canada
- Height: 6 ft 5 in (196 cm)
- Weight: 204 lb (93 kg; 14 st 8 lb)
- Position: Left wing
- Shoots: Left
- NCAA team: Michigan
- NHL draft: 24th overall, 2025; Pittsburgh Penguins

William Bulgar Horcoff (born January 23, 2007) is a Canadian-American college ice hockey player who is a left winger for the Michigan Wolverines of the National Collegiate Athletic Association (NCAA). He was drafted 24th overall by the Pittsburgh Penguins in the 2025 NHL entry draft.

== Playing career ==
=== Junior ===
Horcoff played for the USA Hockey National Team Development Program (NTDP) during the 2023–24 season, where he recorded 11 goals and eight assists in 54 games with the under-17 team. He also recorded five goals and five assists in 35 games for the NTDP in the United States Hockey League (USHL). During the 2024–25 season, he recorded four goals and four assists in 19 games with the under-18 team and two goals and one assist in seven games in the USHL. In November 2024, he was selected to the CHL/USA Prospects Challenge, however he missed the game due to injury. On December 24, 2024, he was named to the USA Hockey All-American Game.

=== College ===
On April 25, 2024, Horcoff committed to play college ice hockey at Michigan. On December 27, 2024, it was announced he would enroll early at Michigan and join the team as a mid-season addition at 17 years old. He made his collegiate debut on January 3, 2025, against Ohio State during the Frozen Confines at Wrigley Field. During the game he scored a goal and an assist, both on the power play. He finished the 2024–25 season with four goals and six assists in 18 games.

During the 2025–26 season, in his sophomore year, he recorded 25 goals and 14 assists in 40 games. He led the nation with seven game-winning goals. On November 28, 2025, during a game against Harvard, he scored two goals, and one assist, to extend his nation goal-scoring lead. The next day he again scored two goals, including the game-winning goal in overtime, to help Michigan sweep the weekend series. He was subsequently named the Big Ten First Star of the Week. During November 2025, he led the nation in goals with nine in nine games, while adding four assists for 14 points to average 1.44 points per game. Five of his nine goals were game-winning goals. He became the first Michigan player to have 18 goals in 18 games since Hobey Baker Award winner Kevin Porter during the 2007–08 season. He was named the Hockey Commissioners Association (HCA) Player of the Month.

== International play ==
Medal record

Representing United States

Ice hockey

World U18 Championships
| Bronze medal – third place | 2025 United States | |

Horcoff represented the United States at the 2023 World U-17 Hockey Challenge where he recorded one goal and two assists in seven games and won a silver medal.

On December 24 2025, Horcoff was named to the United States men's national junior ice hockey team to compete at the 2026 World Junior Ice Hockey Championships. During the tournament he recorded one goal and one assist in five games, and was eliminated in the quarterfinals by Finland.

== Personal life ==
Horcoff was born in Edmonton, while his father, Shawn Horcoff was a member of the NHL’s Edmonton Oilers. The elder Horcoff played over 1,000 games in the NHL, mostly with the Oilers.

Horcoff and his family settled in Birmingham, Michigan following the end of his father’s career.

== Career statistics ==
=== Regular season and playoffs ===
| | | | Regular season | | | | | Playoffs |
| Season | Team | League | GP | G | A | Pts | PIM | GP | G | A | Pts | PIM |
|---|---|---|---|---|---|---|---|---|---|---|---|---|
| 2023–24 | U.S. National Development Team | USHL | 35 | 5 | 5 | 10 | 16 | — | — | — | — | — |
| 2024–25 | U.S. National Development Team | USHL | 7 | 2 | 1 | 3 | 12 | — | — | — | — | — |
| 2024–25 | University of Michigan | B1G | 18 | 4 | 6 | 10 | 6 | — | — | — | — | — |
| 2025–26 | University of Michigan | B1G | 40 | 25 | 14 | 39 | 64 | — | — | — | — | — |
| NCAA totals | | | 58 | 29 | 20 | 49 | 70 | — | — | — | — | — |

=== International ===
| Year | Team | Event | Result | GP | G | A | Pts | PIM |
|---|---|---|---|---|---|---|---|---|
| 2023 | United States | U17 | 2nd place, silver medalist(s) | 7 | 1 | 2 | 3 | 8 |
| 2026 | United States | WJC | 5th | 5 | 1 | 1 | 2 | 0 |
| Junior totals | | | | 12 | 2 | 3 | 5 | 8 |

Awards and achievements
| Preceded by Bill Zonnon | Pittsburgh Penguins first-round draft pick 2025 | Succeeded by Liam Ruck |
