= Ivar Stenberg =

Swedish ice hockey player (born 2007)

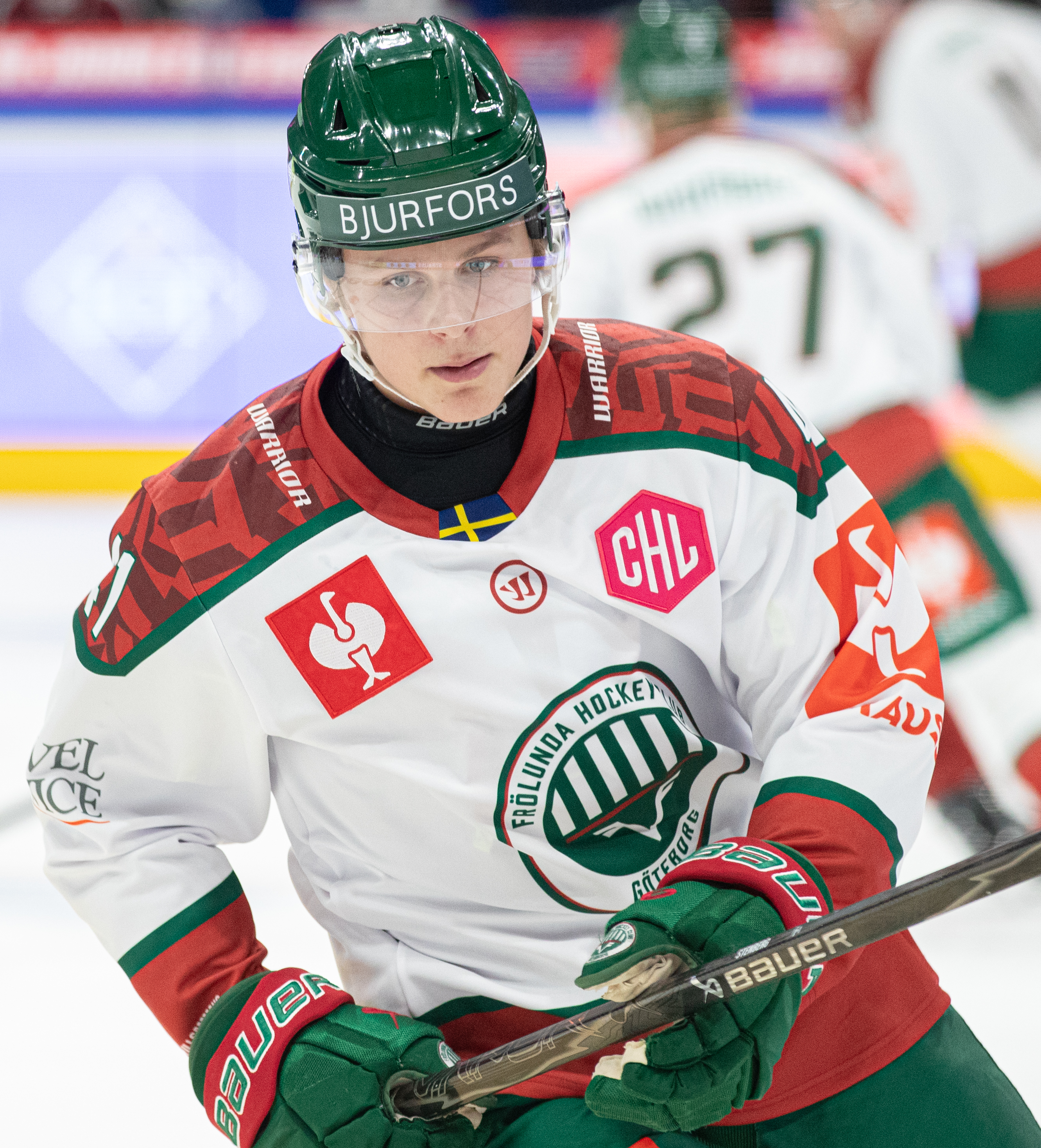
- Stenberg in 2025
- Born: 30 September 2007 (age 19) Stenungsund, Sweden
- Height: 5 ft 11 in (180 cm)
- Weight: 185 lb (84 kg; 13 st 3 lb)
- Position: Winger
- Shoots: Left
- NHL team Former teams: San Jose Sharks; Frölunda HC
- National team: Sweden
- NHL draft: 2nd overall, 2026; San Jose Sharks
- Playing career: 2024–present

Ivar Stenberg (born 30 September 2007) is a Swedish professional ice hockey player who is a winger for the San Jose Sharks of the National Hockey League (NHL). He was selected second overall by the Sharks in the 2026 NHL entry draft. He previously played for Frölunda HC of the Swedish Hockey League (SHL) and made his NHL debut at the start of the 2026–27 season. On October 27th he was promoted to the San Jose Sharks top line which makes him the youngest player in Sharks history to play a game on that line.

== Playing career ==
Stenberg started playing ice hockey for his hometown team Stenungsund Stingers when he was four years old. He played above his age group alongside his older brother Otto, during their youth careers, the brothers were part of Stenungsund's teams that won Göteborgs-Posten's annual youth tournament, the GP‑Pucken – one of Sweden's largest competitions for players aged nine to twelve – on all four occasions in which they participated.

At age 13 he represented Bohuslän/Dalsland in the 2021 TV-pucken – a Swedish national under-16 ice hockey tournament for district teams – recording one assist in five games. He followed in his older brother Otto's footsteps and joined Frölunda HC to play for their junior academy for the 2021–22 season. Playing for the under-16 team he recorded 11 goals and 21 assists for 32 points in 21 games, and five goals and one assist in six games of the under-16 Swedish championship.

He captained Gothenburg at the 2022 TV-pucken, recording four goals and four assists in eight games. He recorded nine goals and 23 assists for a total of 32 points in 12 games with Frölunda's under-16 team during the 2022–23 season, and one goal and four assists in two games of the qualifications for the under-16 Swedish championship, and one goal and two assists in three games of the championships. During the season he also made his debut with the under-18 team in the J18 Region, recording six goals and 11 assists in 12 games, and three goals and five assist in 14 games of the J18 Nationell – a continuation series of J18 Region with the five best teams from each division qualified. He recorded no points in five games of the under-18 Swedish championship playoffs.

Stenberg was named alternate captain of Frölunda's under-18 team for the 2023–24 season, he recorded five goals and 27 assists for a total of 32 points in 18 games of the J18 Region, and 18 goals and 12 assists for a total of 30 points in 13 games of the J18 Nationell. In the under-18 Swedish championships Stenberg recorded five goals and eight assists for a total of 13 points in five games. During the season he made his debut with the under-20 team, recording three goals and five assists in nine games of the J20 Nationell, and two assists in six games of the under-20 Swedish championships.

The following year Stenberg played three games in the J18 Region, recording one goal and seven assists, and only one game in J18 Nationell where he recorded one goal and five assists. During the autumn he spent the majority of the time in the J20 Nationell where he recorded 13 goals and 15 assists in 11 games, before making his professional debut for Frölunda HC in the Swedish Hockey League (SHL) at 17 years old on 12 October 2024, in a game against Linköping HC.

During the 2025–26 season, he recorded 11 goals and 22 assists in 43 games. His 33 points ranks fifth in SHL history among players 18 years old or younger. On 26 June 2026, he was drafted second overall by the San Jose Sharks in the 2026 NHL entry draft. Stenberg signed a three-year, entry-level contract with the Sharks six days later on 2 July, the final day of development camp.

Stenberg made his NHL debut in the 2026–27 season opener on 1 October, a 4–3 overtime win against the Florida Panthers. He recorded his first NHL point, an assist, in the following game on 3 October in a 5–4 overtime win against the Los Angeles Kings. On 13 October, Stenberg scored his first NHL goal, a power-play marker, and added an assist for his first multi-point game in a 6–3 loss to the Boston Bruins.

== International play ==
Medal record

Men's ice hockey

Representing Sweden

World Junior Championships
Gold medal – first place	2026 United States	

World U18 Championships
Silver medal – second place	2025 United States	

On 24 October 2023, Stenberg was named to Sweden's roster for the 2023 World U-17 Hockey Challenge. During the tournament he led the team in scoring with seven goals and three assists in seven games and won a bronze medal. His seven goals tied for the tournament lead. During a preliminary round game against Canada Red, he recorded four goals and one assist.

On 30 July 2024, Stenberg was named to Sweden's roster for the 2024 Hlinka Gretzky Cup. During a preliminary round game against Switzerland he scored four goals and three assists. He finished the tournament with four goals and six assists in five games and won a bronze medal.

Stenberg represented Sweden at the 2024 World Junior A Challenge where he led the tournament in scoring with seven goals and four assists in five games and won a silver medal.

In December 2025, he was selected to represent Sweden at the 2026 World Junior Championships. He led the team in scoring with four goals and six assists in seven games and won a gold medal. During the gold medal game against Czechia he scored one goal and two assists to help Sweden win their first gold medal at the World Junior Championship since 2012.

== Personal life ==
Stenberg's older brother, Otto, was drafted 25th overall by the St. Louis Blues in the 2023 NHL entry draft. His younger brother, Knut, also plays ice hockey. Stenberg lives with former San Jose Sharks captain, Joe Thornton.

== Career statistics ==
=== Regular season and playoffs ===
			Regular season					Playoffs
Season	Team	League	GP	G	A	Pts	PIM	GP	G	A	Pts	PIM
2022–23	Frölunda HC	J18	14	3	5	8	4	5	0	0	0	2
2023–24	Frölunda HC	J18	13	18	12	30	10	5	5	8	13	8
2023–24	Frölunda HC	J20	9	3	5	8	4	6	0	2	2	0
2024–25	Frölunda HC	J18	1	1	5	6	0	—	—	—	—	—
2024–25	Frölunda HC	J20	27	26	27	53	36	—	—	—	—	—
2024–25	Frölunda HC	SHL	25	1	2	3	4	12	3	3	6	2
2025–26	Frölunda HC	SHL	43	11	22	33	6	6	0	4	4	4
SHL totals			68	12	24	36	10	18	3	7	10	6

=== International ===
Year	Team	Event	Result	GP	G	A	Pts	PIM
2023	Sweden	U17	3rd place, bronze medalist(s)	7	7	3	10	2
2024	Sweden	HG18	3rd place, bronze medalist(s)	5	4	6	10	4
2025	Sweden	U18	2nd place, silver medalist(s)	7	8	5	13	4
2026	Sweden	WJC	1st place, gold medalist(s)	7	4	6	10	6
2026	Sweden	WC	7th	8	4	4	8	6
Junior totals				26	23	20	43	16
Senior totals				8	4	4	8	6

Awards and achievements
Preceded by Joshua Ravensbergen	San Jose Sharks first-round draft pick 2026	Succeeded by Keaton Verhoeff
