= Filip Ekberg =

Swedish ice hockey player (born 2005)

- Born: 14 April 2007 (age 19) Uppsala, Sweden
- Height: 5 ft 10 in (178 cm)
- Weight: 168 lb (76 kg; 12 st 0 lb)
- Position: Winger
- Shoots: Left
- OHL team: Ottawa 67's
- NHL draft: 221st overall, 2025; Carolina Hurricanes
- Playing career: 2022–present

Filip Ekberg (born 14 April 2007) is a Swedish ice hockey winger for the Ottawa 67's of the Ontario Hockey League (OHL) as a prospect of the Carolina Hurricanes of the National Hockey League (NHL). He previously played for Almtuna IS of the HockeyAllsvenskan.

== Playing career ==
Ekberg made his professional debut for Almtuna IS of the HockeyAllsvenskan during the 2022–23 season. He scored a hat-trick in his first career game with Almtuna, and became the youngest player to ever score in the HockeyAllsvenskan at 15 years, 328 days. He spent the majority of the season with Almtuna IS' under-20 team, where he recorded nine goals and six assists in 20 games. During the 2023–24 season he recorded two assists in 19 games. He also recorded 12 goals and 17 assists in 33 games with the under-20 team.

On 3 July 2024, he was drafted 33rd overall by the Ottawa 67's in the 2024 CHL Import Draft. On 26 August 2024, he signed with Ottawa. During the 2024–25 season, he recorded 16 goals and 29 assists in 53 games. In March 2025, he recorded four goals and 11 assists in ten games and was subsequently named OHL Rookie of the Month.

== International play ==
Medal record

Representing Sweden

Ice hockey

World U18 Championships
Silver medal – second place	2025 United States	

On 23 October 2023, Ekberg was named to Sweden's roster for the 2023 World U-17 Hockey Challenge. During the tournament he ranked second on the team in scoring with two goals and six assists in seven games and won a bronze medal.

On 23 April 2025, he was selected to represent Sweden at the 2025 IIHF World U18 Championships. During the first preliminary round game against Switzerland he scored four goals and one assist. He led the tournament in scoring with ten goals and eight assists in seven games and won a silver medal. His 18 points set a single-tournament Swedish record, surpassing the previous record of 16 points held by William Nylander and Otto Stenberg. He was subsequently named tournament MVP, and was also named to the media all-star team and was named best forward by the IIHF Directorate.

== Career statistics ==
=== Regular season and playoffs ===
			Regular season					Playoffs
Season	Team	League	GP	G	A	Pts	PIM	GP	G	A	Pts	PIM
2021–22	Almtuna IS	J18	18	5	8	13	2	2	0	0	0	0
2022–23	Almtuna IS	J18	3	4	4	8	2	2	1	1	2	0
2022–23	Almtuna IS	J20	20	9	6	15	6	7	1	5	6	2
2022–23	Almtuna IS	Allsv	1	3	0	3	0	—	—	—	—	—
2023–24	Almtuna IS	J18	—	—	—	—	—	2	0	2	2	0
2023–24	Almtuna IS	J20	33	12	17	29	24	—	—	—	—	—
2023–24	Almtuna IS	Allsv	19	0	2	2	2	2	0	0	0	2
2024–25	Ottawa 67's	OHL	53	16	29	45	8	—	—	—	—	—
2025–26	Ottawa 67's	OHL	59	24	22	46	14	9	3	5	8	6
Allsv totals			20	3	2	5	2	2	0	0	0	2

=== International ===
Year	Team	Event	Result	GP	G	A	Pts	PIM
2023	Sweden	U17	3rd place, bronze medalist(s)	7	2	6	8	2
2024	Sweden	HG18	3rd place, bronze medalist(s)	3	2	1	3	0
2025	Sweden	U18	2nd place, silver medalist(s)	7	10	8	18	6
Junior totals				17	14	15	29	8

== Awards and honors ==
Honors	Year	Ref
International
IIHF World U18 Championship Best Forward	2025	
IIHF World U18 Championship Most Valuable Player	2025	
IIHF World U18 Championship Media All-Star team	2025	
