= Matthew Schaefer =

Canadian ice hockey player (born 2007)

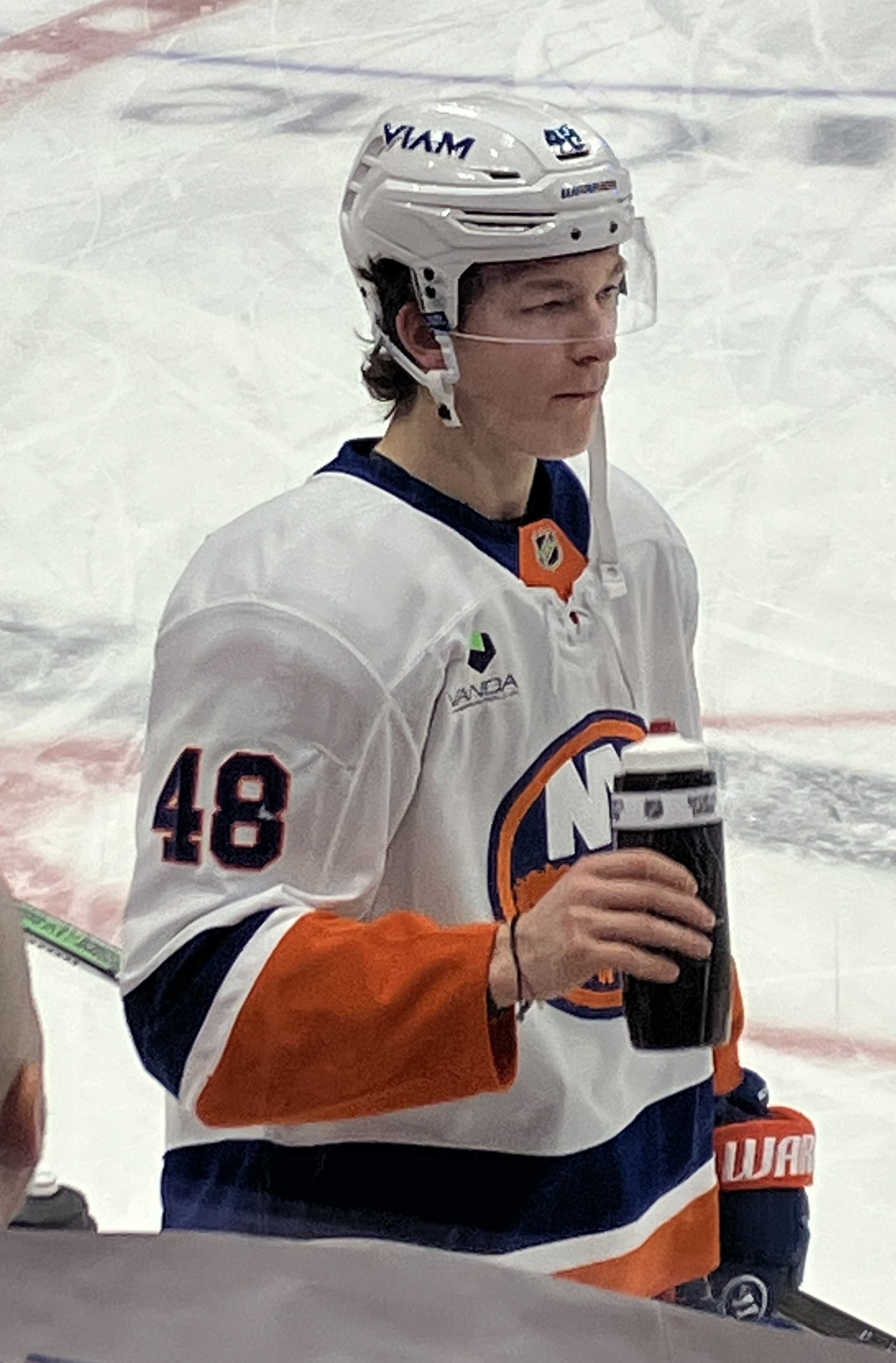
- Schaefer with the New York Islanders in 2026
- Born: September 5, 2007 (age 19) Hamilton, Ontario, Canada
- Height: 6 ft 2 in (188 cm)
- Weight: 186 lb (84 kg; 13 st 4 lb)
- Position: Defence
- Shoots: Left
- NHL team: New York Islanders
- NHL draft: 1st overall, 2025; New York Islanders
- Playing career: 2025–present

Matthew Schaefer (born September 5, 2007) is a Canadian professional ice hockey player who is a defenceman and alternate captain for the New York Islanders of the National Hockey League (NHL). He was selected first overall by the Islanders in the 2025 NHL entry draft, and won the Calder Memorial Trophy as the NHL's best rookie in 2025–26.

== Playing career ==
=== Junior ===
Playing at the under-16 level for the Halton Hurricanes of the South-Central Triple A Hockey League in 2022–23, Schaefer recorded 12 goals and 32 points in 25 games, earning player of the year honours. Following the season, he was selected first overall in the 2023 Ontario Hockey League (OHL) draft by the Erie Otters. He became the third first overall pick in Otters history, after Ryan O'Reilly and Connor McDavid. In May 2023, he signed a contract with the Otters, committing to play for the team beginning that fall.

Early in his rookie OHL season, the 2023–24 season, Schaefer scored his first goal on October 12, 2023, a power play goal against the Niagara IceDogs. As the backbone of an Otters defence group that The Hockey News described as "bleak," Schaefer was leaned upon heavily but managed the transition from minor hockey to the OHL smoothly. He would finish the year with three goals and 17 points in 56 games, earning first team all-rookie honors. His impressive rookie season came in the face of significant personal struggles, as both his mother and his billet mother died during the season.

Schaefer began the 2024–25 season sick with mononucleosis, missing nine games before getting clearance to play. In January 2025, not long after sustaining a broken collarbone at the 2025 World Junior Championships, he was named the top North American skater on NHL Central Scouting Bureau's midterm rankings. Despite missing the remainder of the season, Schaefer received the CHL Top Draft Prospect Award in advance of the 2025 NHL entry draft, having recorded seven goals and 15 assists in 17 games played.

=== Professional ===
On June 27, 2025, Schaefer was selected first overall by the New York Islanders in the 2025 NHL entry draft. He signed a three-year, entry-level contract with the Islanders on August 4. Schaefer made his NHL debut with the team on October 9, against the Pittsburgh Penguins, and recorded his first NHL point by assisting on a first-period goal by Jonathan Drouin. Two days later, on October 11, Schaefer scored his first NHL goal against the Washington Capitals as the Islanders lost the game 4–2. He became the second-youngest defenceman in NHL history to score his first NHL goal at 18 years, 36 days. On October 21, Schaefer recorded his first NHL multi-point game with one goal and one assist in New York's 4–3 win over the San Jose Sharks, also becoming the second rookie defenceman in NHL history to record a point in his first six career games. In recognition of his efforts, Schaefer was named the NHL's Rookie of the Month for October. On November 2, Schaefer became the youngest defenceman in NHL history to record a multi-goal game. On November 14, he became the youngest NHL player to score an overtime goal when he scored the game-winner against the Utah Mammoth. By late November, he was the league website's consensus favourite for the Calder Memorial Trophy as the league's best rookie.

On February 26, 2026, Schaefer registered 17th and 18th goals of the season in a 4–3 overtime win over the Montreal Canadiens, tying and surpassing Phil Housley for the most goals scored by an 18-year-old defenceman. He also tied and surpassed Denis Potvin for the most goals scored by a rookie defenceman in Islanders history. On March 1, he recorded his fourth multi-goal game of the season and his first three-point performance with two goals and an assist in a 5–4 win against the Florida Panthers. With the second goal, he became the first defenceman in NHL history to be the fastest rookie to 20 goals in a season. He also became just the second Islanders' defenceman and first since Potvin in 1985–86 to reach the 20-goal mark.

On March 19, Schaefer recorded his 50th point of the season, with a goal against the Ottawa Senators. He became the youngest defenceman in NHL history to reach 50 career points at 18 years and 195 days. On March 31, Schaefer recorded his 57th point of the season, surpassing Stefan Persson for the most points by a rookie defenceman in Islanders history. On April 4, Schaefer recorded 58th point of the season and passed Housley for most points by an 18-year-old defenceman in league history. On April 9, Schaefer scored his 23rd goal of the season, tying Brian Leetch's single-season record for most goals scored by a rookie defenceman. He finished the season with 59 points in 82 games, and tied Beckett Sennecke for the rookie goal-scoring lead. In recognition of his achievements, he was voted a finalist for the Calder Memorial Trophy. On May 13, Schaefer unanimously won the Calder Trophy, with his father and brother presenting him with the trophy during an appearance on GMA3. He became the sixth player in Islanders history and the first since Mathew Barzal in 2017–18 to win the award, as well as being the first unanimous winner since Teemu Selänne in 1992–93. Schaefer was also named to the NHL All-Rookie Team.

Before the start of the 2026–27 season, Schaefer was named alternate captain of the Islanders on September 29, 2026. On October 27, Schaefer became the first player in NHL history to play an entire five-minute overtime without leaving the ice. On November 17, Schaefer recorded his first career hat trick in a 5–1 win over the Columbus Blue Jackets. He became the third defenceman in Islanders history and the first since Denis Potvin in 1982 to register a hat trick, as well the second youngest NHL defenceman to record one after Phil Housley.

== International play ==
Medal record

Men's ice hockey

Representing Canada

World U18 Championship
Gold medal – first place	2024 Finland	

Hlinka Gretzky Cup
Gold medal – first place	2024 Canada	

Representing Ontario at the 2023 Canada Winter Games, Schaefer, as the team's captain, scored a game-winning goal in overtime of the finals to secure a 3–2 victory over Saskatchewan and a gold medal. Later that year, he would win gold with the Canadian under-17 team at the 2023 World U-17 Hockey Challenge, again as captain.

At the 2024 World U18 Championships, Schaefer and Canada went undefeated to a gold medal finish. Although overshadowed by fellow underage player Gavin McKenna and his 20 points at the event, Schaefer was also a standout, averaging just under 18 minutes a night including power play and penalty kill deployment and scoring one goal and five points in seven games.

Schaefer was the Canadian captain at the 2024 Hlinka Gretzky Cup, where his standout play was a driving force behind the Canadians claiming the gold medal. He opened the tournament with two goals in a 10–0 victory against Switzerland, adding four assists over the rest of the event to finish with six points.

After scoring a goal and an assist in the first game of the 2025 World Junior Championships, Schaefer suffered a broken collarbone in the following match, a 3–2 upset loss to Latvia.

== Personal life ==
Matthew Schaefer is the younger son of Todd and Jennifer Schaefer. His older brother Johnny, like him, played in the Ontario Hockey League (OHL). His mother died of breast cancer in February 2024, less than three months after his billet mother Emily Matson was struck and killed by a train in an apparent suicide.

Schaefer lived with New York Islanders veteran Matt Martin and his family during his first NHL season in 2025–26.

== Career statistics ==
=== Regular season and playoffs ===
			Regular season					Playoffs
Season	Team	League	GP	G	A	Pts	PIM	GP	G	A	Pts	PIM
2023–24	Erie Otters	OHL	56	3	14	17	16	6	0	3	3	2
2024–25	Erie Otters	OHL	17	7	15	22	8	—	—	—	—	—
2025–26	New York Islanders	NHL	82	23	36	59	38	—	—	—	—	—
NHL totals			82	23	36	59	38	—	—	—	—	—

=== International ===
Year	Team	Event	Result	GP	G	A	Pts	PIM
2023	Canada White	U17	1st place, gold medalist(s)	8	1	3	4	6
2024	Canada	U18	1st place, gold medalist(s)	7	1	4	5	2
2024	Canada	HG18	1st place, gold medalist(s)	5	2	4	6	0
2025	Canada	WJC	5th	2	1	1	2	0
Junior totals				22	5	12	17	8

== Awards and honours ==
Award	Year	Ref
CHL
CHL Top Draft Prospect Award	2025	
OHL
First All-Rookie Team	2024	
NHL
Rookie of the Month	October 2025	
Calder Memorial Trophy	2026	
NHL All-Rookie Team	2026	

== Records ==
=== NHL ===
- Most goals by a rookie defenseman (23, tied with Brian Leetch)

=== New York Islanders ===
- Most points by a rookie defenseman (59)

Awards and achievements
Preceded by Macklin Celebrini	NHL first overall draft pick 2025	Succeeded by Gavin McKenna
Preceded by Cole Eiserman	New York Islanders first round pick 2025	Succeeded by Victor Eklund
Preceded by Lane Hutson	Calder Memorial Trophy; 2026	Succeeded by Incumbent
