= Emily Matson =

American journalist (1981–2023)

- Born: Emily Eileen Matson; February 21, 1981; Erie, Pennsylvania, U.S.
- Died: December 11, 2023 (aged 42); Fairview, Pennsylvania, U.S.
- Education: University of Pittsburgh
- Occupations: producer, reporter, presenter
- Known for: Erie News Now
- Spouse: Ryan Onderko
- Children: 2
- Awards: Outstanding News Award

Emily Matson (February 21, 1981 – December 11, 2023) also known as Emily Eileen Onderko, was an American journalist, producer, reporter and presenter.

== Early life and education ==
Matson was born and raised in Erie, Pennsylvania to Patricia and Thomas Matson. As a teenager, she and her parents traveled extensively.

She attended Mercyhurst Preparatory High School. She completed her bachelor's degree in communications and media technology at the University of Pittsburgh. She graduated from La Roche University.

== Career ==
She was an intern at WJET-TV in 2000 and then joined the team at WICU-TV television channel affiliated with NBC, where she worked for 19 years. She hosted the television program: “Erie News Now.”

Matson was twice awarded the Featured News Award by the Pennsylvania Association of Broadcasters.

Her journalistic style was described as transparent and outspoken.

Matson was an active volunteer for youth with an interest in journalism. She volunteered in the journalism program of Edinboro University of Pennsylvania (PennWest).

== Personal life ==
She married Ryan Onderko and was the mother of Kyle and Emily Onderko. At the time of her death, she was the billet host for ice hockey player Matthew Schaefer.

== Death ==
Matson died on December 11, 2023, at age 42; the coroner determined that the cause of death was suicide. Matson died when she stepped in front of a train in Fairview, Pennsylvania.
