= CHL USA Prospects Challenge =

Annual Canadian Hockey League event

- Country: Canada
- Inaugurated: 2024
- Major events: Ice hockey
- Organiser: Canadian Hockey League

The CHL USA Prospects Challenge is an annual junior ice hockey series between the Canadian Hockey League (CHL) and the USA Hockey National Team Development Program. The two-game series showcases the talents of top prospects for the upcoming entry draft of the National Hockey League (NHL), in a collaborative effort with the NHL Central Scouting Bureau to select the participants.

== Format ==
The CHL USA Prospects Challenge is an annual two-game series featuring the top NHL entry draft prospects from the CHL versus those from the USA Hockey National Team Development Program. CHL players for the game are chosen by the NHL Central Scouting Bureau in consultation with NHL teams.

A game after regulation time would see a five-minute 3-on-3 overtime period then a shootout if necessary. If the series is tied on points after two games, the teams would play 3-on-3 20-minute period(s) to determine the winner. CHL president Dan MacKenzie felt that the new event would "[serve] as a best-on-best showcase [to] provide our top draft-eligible players from across the CHL with a great opportunity to demonstrate their elite talent and world-class skill set as they work towards hearing their name called at the NHL draft".

== 2024 Kubota CHL USA Prospects Challenge ==
In the 2024 game, head coaches were Kris Mallette for the CHL, and Greg Moore for the USA. Porter Martone was selected as the CHL captain; with Blake Fiddler, Matthew Schaefer, and Caleb Desnoyers as alternate captains. This was the first head-to-head matchup between Canada and the USA since the Hlinka Gretzky Cup.

The CHL team included three players expected to be top five picks in the 2025 NHL entry draft, and won both games of the series. ESPN opined that, "this was a dominant showing from Team CHL and shows the caliber of team they could send to the under-18 World Championships if every player was available for selection". The CHL's top line of Martone, Desnoyers, and Michael Misa, led the scoring, with all three expected as top-10 draft picks. Jack Murtagh scored two of the three USA goals, and goaltender Harrison Boettiger was credited by ESPN for keeping the scores close.

2024 Kubota CHL USA Prospects Challenge
Dates and location	Game 1: November 26, Canada Life Place (London, Ontario) Game 2: November 27, Tribute Communities Centre (Oshawa, Ontario)	
Game report	Home	Away
Team	Canadian Hockey League	USA Hockey National Team Development Program
Coaches	Kris Mallette, Gordie Dwyer, Ryan Oulahen	Greg Moore, Chad Kolarik, Ryan Hayes
Game 1 score	6	1
Game 2 score	3	2

== 2025 CHL USA Prospects Challenge ==
2025 CHL USA Prospects Challenge
Dates and location	Game 1: November 25, Scotiabank Saddledome (Calgary, Alberta) Game 2: November 26, VisitLethbridge.com Arena (Lethbridge, Alberta)	
Game report	Home	Away
Team	Canadian Hockey League	USA Hockey National Team Development Program
Coaches	Willie Desjardins, Sylvain Favreau	Jay McKee, Mike Johnston
Game 1 score	2	4
Game 2 score	4	3
Super Overtime	0	1

== See also ==
- CHL/NHL Top Prospects Game, held until 2024
