= Jack Ivankovic =

Canadian ice hockey player (born 2007)

- Born: May 22, 2007 (age 19) Mississauga, Ontario, Canada
- Height: 6 ft 0 in (183 cm)
- Weight: 178 lb (81 kg; 12 st 10 lb)
- Position: Goaltender
- Catches: Left
- NCAA team: Michigan
- NHL draft: 58th overall, 2025; Nashville Predators

Jack Ivankovic (born May 22, 2007) is a Canadian college ice hockey goaltender for the Michigan Wolverines of the National Collegiate Athletic Association (NCAA). He was drafted 58th overall by the Nashville Predators in the 2025 NHL entry draft.

== Playing career ==
On March 29, 2023, Ivankovic was drafted in the first round, seventh overall, by the Mississauga Steelheads in the 2023 OHL Priority Selection. He was the first goaltender selected in the draft. On May 2, 2023, he signed with the Steelheads. During the 2023–24 season, in his rookie season, he appeared in 25 games, and posted a 14–5–4 record, with a 2.72 goals against average (GAA) and a .915 save percentage. Following the season he won the F. W. "Dinty" Moore Trophy and was named to the OHL Second All-Rookie team.

During the 2024–25 season, he appeared in 43 games and posted a 25–12–5 record, with a 3.05 GAA and a .903 save percentage during the regular season. He was drafted in the second round, 58th overall, by the Nashville Predators in the 2025 NHL entry draft.

On June 1, 2025, Ivankovic committed to play college ice hockey at Michigan. During the 2025–26 season, in his freshman year, he appeared in 35 games and posted a 25–8–1 record, with a 2.15 GAA and a .921 save percentage. He became the first Michigan goaltender to start 7–0 since Paul Fricker in 1979. During December he led the Big Ten with a 1.02 GAA and .964 save percentage, including a 23-save shutout against No. 3 Michigan State on December 5, 2025. He was subsequently named the Hockey Commissioners Association (HCA) National Goalie of the Month. Following the season he was named to the All-Big Ten Freshman Team and All-Big Ten Second Team. He was also named a semifinalist for the Mike Richter Award.

== International play ==
Medal record

Representing Canada

Ice hockey

World Junior Championships
Bronze medal – third place	2026 United States	

World U18 Championships
Gold medal – first place	2024 Finland	
Gold medal – first place	2025 United States	

Ivankovic represented Canada at the 2024 IIHF World U18 Championships and won a gold medal. On December 14, 2024, he was selected to represent Canada at the 2025 World Junior Ice Hockey Championships. During the tournament he appeared in one game against Latvia.

On April 12, 2025, he was again selected to represent Canada at the 2025 IIHF World U18 Championships. During the tournament he posted a 6–0–0 record, with a 1.05 GAA, a .961 save percentage, and won a gold medal. During the gold medal game against Sweden, he stopped all 28 shots, for his second consecutive shutout of the tournament. This marked the first time Canada has won consecutive gold medals at the IIHF World U18 Championship. He was subsequently named to the media all-star team and was named best goaltender by the IIHF Directorate.

In December 2025, he was selected to represent Canada at the 2026 World Junior Ice Hockey Championships. He led the tournament with a 2.34 GAA and won a bronze medal.

== Personal life ==
Ivankovic's father, Frank, was drafted in the ninth round, 232nd overall, by the Pittsburgh Penguins in the 1995 NHL entry draft.

== Career statistics ==
=== Regular season and playoffs ===
			Regular season									Playoffs
Season	Team	League	GP	W	L	OTL	MIN	GA	SO	GAA	SV%	GP	W	L	MIN	GA	SO	GAA	SV%
2023–24	Mississauga Steelheads	OHL	25	14	5	4	1,412	64	1	2.72	.915	—	—	—	—	—	—	—	—
2024–25	Brampton Steelheads	OHL	43	25	12	5	2,477	126	2	3.05	.903	5	1	3	210	17	0	4.87	.877
2025–26	University of Michigan	B1G	35	25	8	1	2,093	75	3	2.15	.921	—	—	—	—	—	—	—	—
NCAA totals			35	25	8	1	2,093	75	3	2.15	.921	—	—	—	—	—	—	—	—

=== International ===
Year	Team	Event	Result	GP	W	L	T	MIN	GA	SO	GAA	SV%
2023	Canada White	U17	1st place, gold medalist(s)	8	5	3	0	430	18	0	2.51	.923
2024	Canada	HG18	1st place, gold medalist(s)	4	4	0	0	240	3	1	0.75	.967
2025	Canada	WJC	5th	1	0	0	1	65	2	0	1.85	.923
2025	Canada	U18	1st place, gold medalist(s)	6	6	0	0	343	6	0	1.05	.961
2026	Canada	WJC	3rd place, bronze medalist(s)	3	2	1	0	180	7	0	2.33	.918
Junior totals				22	17	4	1	1258	36	1	1.72	.939

== Awards and honours ==
Honours	Year	Ref
College
All-Big Ten Second Team	2026	
All-Big Ten Freshman Team	2026	
Big Ten All-Tournament Team	2026	
OHL
Second All-Rookie Team	2024	
F. W. "Dinty" Moore Trophy	2024	
International
IIHF World U18 Championship Best Goaltender	2025	
IIHF World U18 Championship Media All-Star team	2025	
