= Eric Nilson =

Swedish ice hockey player (born 2007)

- Born: 11 May 2007 (age 19) Calgary, Alberta, Canada
- Height: 6 ft 0 in (183 cm)
- Weight: 165 lb (75 kg; 11 st 11 lb)
- Position: Centre
- Shoots: Right
- NCAA team: Michigan State University
- NHL draft: 45th overall, 2025; Anaheim Ducks

Eric Nilson (born 11 May 2007) is a Swedish-Canadian college ice hockey center for Michigan State University of the National Collegiate Athletic Association (NCAA). He was drafted 45th overall by the Anaheim Ducks in the 2025 NHL entry draft.

== Playing career ==
Initially ranked as a fourth or fifth round prospect by NHL Central Scouting Bureau ahead of the 2025 NHL entry draft, Nilson rose to the sixth-ranked European skater in their midterm rankings.

Nilson played the 2024–25 season with Djurgårdens IF of the HockeyAllsvenskan. He joined the Michigan State Spartans for the 2025–26 season.

== International play ==
Medal record

Representing Sweden

Ice hockey

World Junior Championships
Gold medal – first place	2026 United States	

World U18 Championships
Silver medal – second place	2025 United States	

Nilson represented Sweden at the 2024 Hlinka Gretzky Cup. Entering the bronze medal match pointless at the event, he recorded an assist and a hat-trick to help Sweden secure bronze.

In December 2025, he was selected to represent Sweden at the 2026 World Junior Ice Hockey Championships. He recorded one goal and two assists in seven games and won a gold medal. This was Sweden's first gold medal at the IIHF World Junior Championship since 2012.

== Personal life ==
Nilson is the son of former NHL player Marcus Nilson and has a sister, Alice (born 2009), playing junior hockey in the Brynäs IF system.

== Career statistics ==
=== International ===
Year	Team	Event	Result	GP	G	A	Pts	PIM
2024	Sweden	HG18	3rd place, bronze medalist(s)	5	3	1	4	2
2026	Sweden	WJC	1st place, gold medalist(s)	7	1	2	3	6
Junior totals				12	4	3	7	8
