= Cole McKinney =

American ice hockey player (born 2007)

- Born: March 16, 2007 (age 19) Lake Forest, Illinois, U.S.
- Height: 6 ft 1 in (185 cm)
- Weight: 203 lb (92 kg; 14 st 7 lb)
- Position: Center
- Shoots: Right
- NCAA team: Michigan
- NHL draft: 53rd overall, 2025; San Jose Sharks

Cole McKinney (born March 16, 2007) is an American college ice hockey center for the Michigan Wolverines of the National Collegiate Athletic Association (NCAA). He was drafted 53rd overall by the San Jose Sharks in the 2025 NHL entry draft.

== Playing career ==
McKinney played two years with the U.S. National Development Team (NTDP). During the 2024–25 season, in his draft-eligible year, he led the team in scoring with 61 points. He recorded 27 goals and 34 assists in 60 games with the under-18 team, and added 15 goals and 11 assists in 23 games with the NTDP in the USHL. He was drafted in the second round, 53rd overall, by the San Jose Sharks in the 2025 NHL entry draft.

On August 9, 2023, he committed to play college ice hockey at Michigan. During the 2025–26 season, in his freshman year, he recorded eight goals and 12 assists in 40 games. He recorded his first career goal and assist in the season opener against Mercyhurst on October 3, 2025.

== International play ==
Medal record

Representing United States

Ice hockey

World U18 Championships
Bronze medal – third place	2025 United States	

McKinney represented the United States at the 2025 IIHF World U18 Championships, where he ranked third on the team in scoring with three goals and two assists in seven games and won a bronze medal.

On December 24 2025, McKinney was named to the United States men's national junior ice hockey team to compete at the 2026 World Junior Ice Hockey Championships. During the tournament he recorded one assist in five games, and was eliminated in the quarterfinals by Finland.

== Career statistics ==
=== Regular season and playoffs ===
			Regular season					Playoffs
Season	Team	League	GP	G	A	Pts	PIM	GP	G	A	Pts	PIM
2023–24	U.S. National Development Team	USHL	34	6	5	11	16	—	—	—	—	—
2024–25	U.S. National Development Team	USHL	23	15	11	26	18	—	—	—	—	—
2025–26	University of Michigan	B1G	40	8	12	20	28	—	—	—	—	—
NCAA totals			40	8	12	20	28	—	—	—	—	—

=== International ===
Year	Team	Event	Result	GP	G	A	Pts	PIM
2025	United States	U18	3rd place, bronze medalist(s)	7	3	2	5	2
2026	United States	WJC	5th	5	0	1	1	2
Junior totals				12	3	3	6	4
