= Blake Fiddler =

American - Canadian ice hockey player (born 2007)

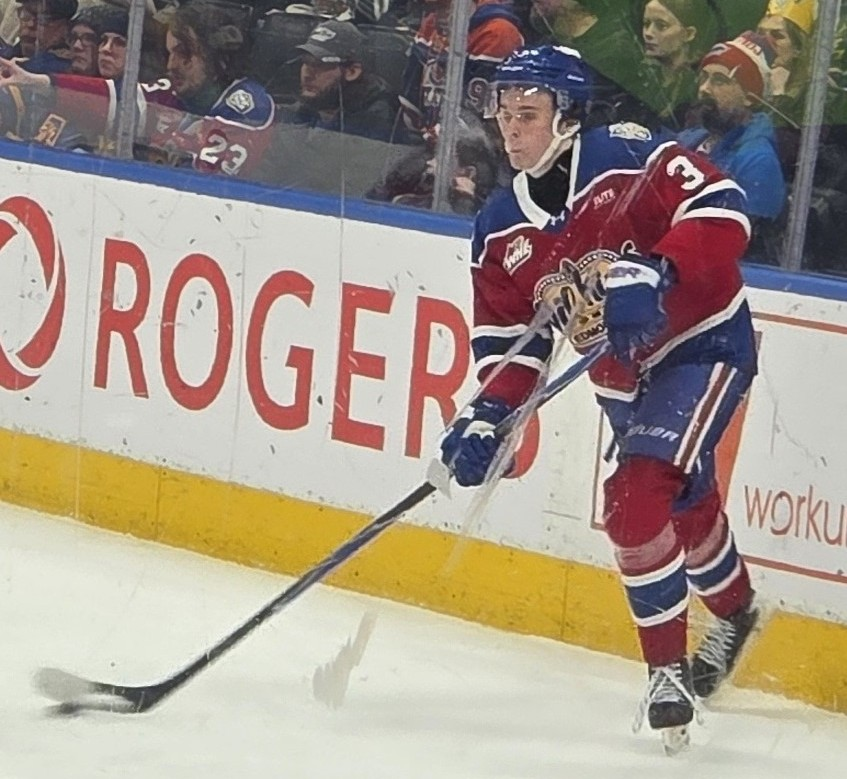
- Fiddler in 2026
- Born: July 9, 2007 (age 19) Nashville, Tennessee, U.S.
- Height: 6 ft 4 in (193 cm)
- Weight: 218 lb (99 kg; 15 st 8 lb)
- Position: Defence
- Shoots: Right
- WHL team: Edmonton Oil Kings
- NHL draft: 36th overall, 2025; Seattle Kraken

Blake Fiddler (born July 9, 2007) is an American-Canadian junior ice hockey defenseman for the Edmonton Oil Kings of the Western Hockey League (WHL). He was drafted 36th overall by the Seattle Kraken in the 2025 NHL entry draft.

== Early life ==
Fiddler was born in Nashville, Tennessee, while his father, Vernon, was playing for the Nashville Predators of the National Hockey League (NHL).

== Playing career ==
During the 2023–24 season, Fiddler recorded five goals and ten assists in 63 games for the Edmonton Oil Kings. During the 2024–25 season, in his draft eligible year, he improved his performance, scoring ten goals and 23 assists in 64 regular season games, along with one assist in seven playoff games.

Fiddler was drafted in the second round, 36th overall, by the Seattle Kraken in the 2025 NHL entry draft by the Seattle Kraken.

== International play ==
Medal record

Representing United States

Ice hockey

World U18 Championships
Bronze medal – third place	2025 United States	

Fiddler possesses dual-citizenship with Canada and the United States. He made his international debut for Canada White at the 2023 World U-17 Hockey Challenge where he recorded one goal in eight games and won a gold medal.

Fiddler captained the United States team at the 2024 Hlinka Gretzky Cup, where he recorded one goal and three assists in five games. He then represented the United States at the 2025 IIHF World U18 Championships, where he recorded two goals and one assist in seven games, and won a bronze medal.

== Career statistics ==
=== Regular season and playoffs ===
			Regular season					Playoffs
Season	Team	League	GP	G	A	Pts	PIM	GP	G	A	Pts	PIM
2023–24	Edmonton Oil Kings	WHL	63	5	10	15	12	—	—	—	—	—
2024–25	Edmonton Oil Kings	WHL	64	10	23	33	36	7	0	1	1	0
WHL totals			127	15	33	48	48	7	0	1	1	0

=== International ===
Year	Team	Event	Result	GP	G	A	Pts	PIM
2023	Canada White	U17	1st place, gold medalist(s)	8	1	0	1	0
2024	United States	HG18	4th	5	1	3	4	0
2025	United States	U18	3rd place, bronze medalist(s)	7	2	1	3	0
Junior totals				20	4	4	8	0
