= Jordan Kyrou =

Canadian ice hockey player (born 1998)

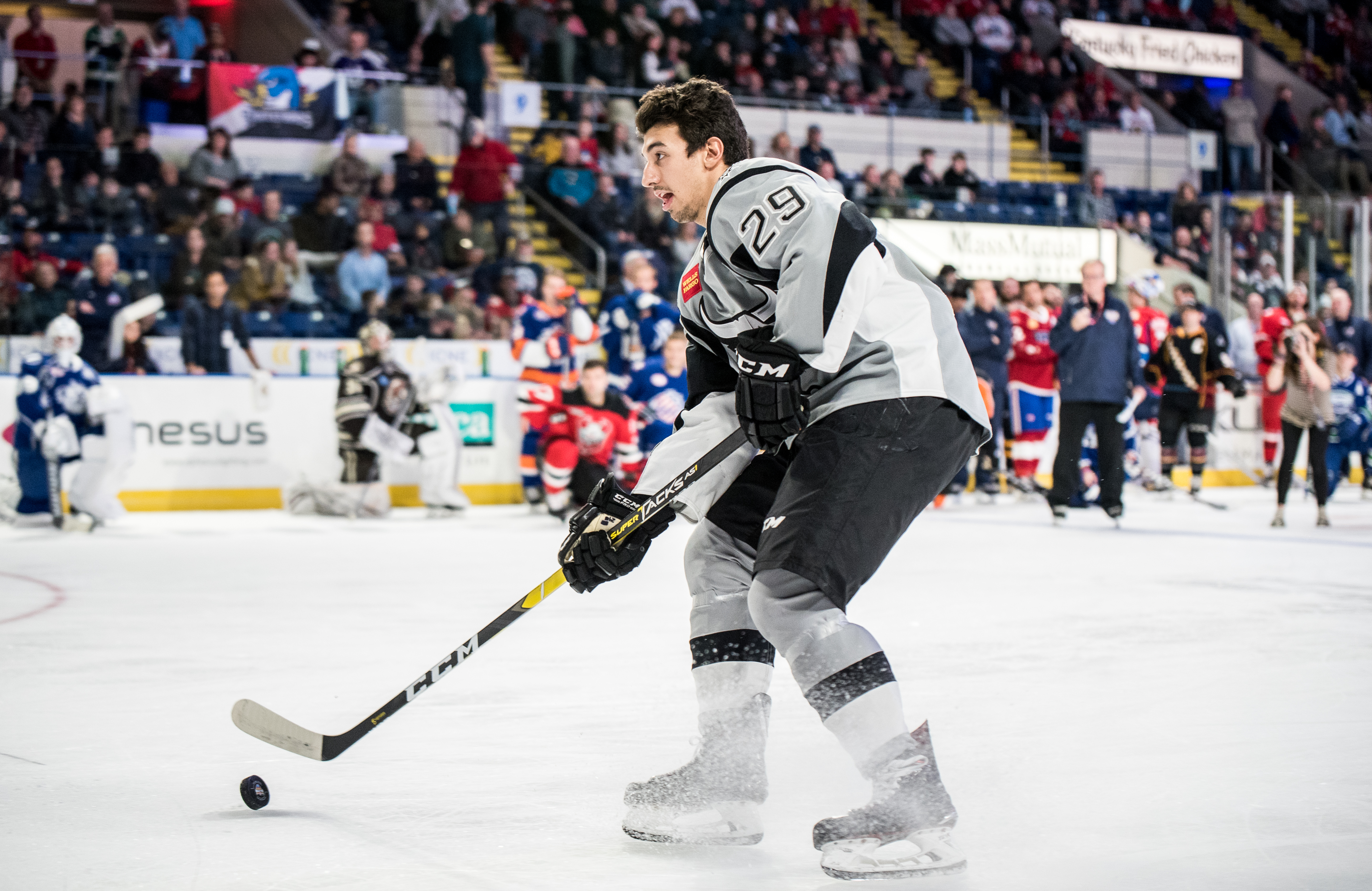
- Kyrou with the San Antonio Rampage in 2019
- Born: May 5, 1998 (age 28) Toronto, Ontario, Canada
- Height: 6 ft 1 in (185 cm)
- Weight: 189 lb (86 kg; 13 st 7 lb)
- Position: Forward
- Shoots: Right
- NHL team Former teams: Washington Capitals; St. Louis Blues
- NHL draft: 35th overall, 2016; St. Louis Blues
- Playing career: 2017–present

Jordan Kyrou (born May 5, 1998) is a Canadian professional ice hockey player who is a forward for the Washington Capitals of the National Hockey League (NHL). Kyrou was selected 35th overall in the 2016 NHL entry draft by the St. Louis Blues.

== Playing career ==
Kyrou first played junior hockey as a youth after moving to Mississauga, Ontario. Whilst playing for the Mississauga AAA Senators, Kyrou was selected with the 38th overall pick in the 2014 OHL Priority Selection draft by the Sarnia Sting. He was signed to a standard players contract with the Sting on July 7, 2014. Kyrou completed the 2014–15 season in making his OHL debut with the Sarnia Sting, featuring in 63 games and accumulating 36 points.

At the completion of his second full major junior season with Sarnia in the 2015–16 season, Kyrou was selected in the second-round, 35th overall, of the 2016 NHL entry draft by the St. Louis Blues. On July 27, 2016, Kyrou was signed by the Blues to a three-year, entry-level contract. Before the 2017–18 season, and his fourth season with the Sarnia Sting, Kyrou was named captain of the Stings. At the end of the 2017–18 season Kyrou was awarded the Jim Mahon Memorial Trophy as the OHL's top scoring right winger after he led all right wingers with 109 points.

Kyrou made the Blues opening night roster for the 2018–19 season after attending training camp, and subsequently made his NHL debut on October 4 against the Winnipeg Jets. He recorded his first NHL point, an assist, on October 12 in 5–3 win over the Calgary Flames and his first career NHL goal on December 9, 2018, in a loss to the Vancouver Canucks.

Kyrou began the 2019–20 season on the injured list and was sent down to the San Antonio Rampage (AHL) upon recovery. He was recalled to the St. Louis Blues on December 9, 2019, and scored his first goal of the season on December 16, 2019, in a 5–2 win over the Colorado Avalanche.

On August 3, 2021, the Blues re-signed Kyrou to a two-year, $5.6 million contract.

Kyrou was selected to play in the 2022 All-Star Game and competed in the Fastest Skater competition, which he won.

On September 13, 2022, Kyrou signed an eight-year, $65 million extension with the Blues.

On June 23, 2026, Kyrou was traded to the Washington Capitals in exchange for Milton Gästrin, Connor McMichael and a 2026 first-round pick.

== International play ==
Medal record

Men's ice hockey

Representing Canada

World Junior Championships
Gold medal – first place	2018 United States	

Kyrou played for Canada's gold medal-winning team at the 2018 World Junior Championships.

== Personal life ==
Kyrou is of Greek descent, with his paternal grandparents, Iordanis "Jordan", and Maria, "Mary" (née Broumas) being Greek immigrants. His parents are Aki and Roula (née Economou), and he has two younger siblings, Matina and Christian. His brother Christian also plays ice hockey and was selected by the Dallas Stars in the 2022 NHL entry draft.

During the pause in play due to COVID-19, Kyrou competed in a league-wide Fortnite tournament for charity with teammates Robert Thomas and Vince Dunn. Together, they finished in first place and donated $50,000 to the St. Louis Children's Hospital, $25,000 to the St. Louis Area Foodbank, and $25,000 to muscular dystrophy research.

== Career statistics ==
=== Regular season and playoffs ===
			Regular season					Playoffs
Season	Team	League	GP	G	A	Pts	PIM	GP	G	A	Pts	PIM
2014–15	Sarnia Sting	OHL	63	13	23	36	12	5	1	5	6	0
2015–16	Sarnia Sting	OHL	65	17	34	51	14	7	1	6	7	2
2016–17	Sarnia Sting	OHL	66	30	64	94	36	4	1	2	3	0
2016–17	Chicago Wolves	AHL	1	0	0	0	0	—	—	—	—	—
2017–18	Sarnia Sting	OHL	56	39	70	109	22	12	3	1	4	10
2018–19	St. Louis Blues	NHL	16	1	2	3	4	—	—	—	—	—
2018–19	San Antonio Rampage	AHL	47	16	27	43	10	—	—	—	—	—
2019–20	San Antonio Rampage	AHL	16	9	6	15	10	—	—	—	—	—
2019–20	St. Louis Blues	NHL	28	4	5	9	8	5	0	0	0	0
2020–21	St. Louis Blues	NHL	55	14	21	35	12	4	1	0	1	0
2021–22	St. Louis Blues	NHL	74	27	48	75	20	12	7	2	9	4
2022–23	St. Louis Blues	NHL	79	37	36	73	22	—	—	—	—	—
2023–24	St. Louis Blues	NHL	82	31	36	67	22	—	—	—	—	—
2024–25	St. Louis Blues	NHL	82	36	34	70	20	7	3	0	3	0
2025–26	St. Louis Blues	NHL	72	18	28	46	8	—	—	—	—	—
NHL totals			488	168	210	378	116	28	11	2	13	4

=== International ===
Year	Team	Event	Result	GP	G	A	Pts	PIM
2014	Canada White	U17	5th	5	0	4	4	0
2016	Canada	IH18	5th	4	1	1	2	4
2018	Canada	WJC	1st place, gold medalist(s)	7	3	7	10	0
Junior totals				16	4	12	16	6

== Awards and honours ==
Award	Year	Ref
OHL
CHL Top Prospects Game	2016	
First All-Star Team	2018	
Jim Mahon Memorial Trophy	2018	
NHL
All-Star Game	2022	
