= 2025 IIHF World U18 Championships =

Under-18 men's ice hockey tournament

2025 IIHF U18 World Championship

Tournament details
- Host country: United States
- Cities: Frisco; Allen
- Venues: 2 (in 2 host cities)
- Dates: April 23 – May 3, 2025
- Teams: 10

Final positions
- Champions: Canada (6th title)
- Runners-up: Sweden
- Third place: United States
- Fourth place: Slovakia

Tournament statistics
- Games played: 29
- Goals scored: 226 (7.79 per game)
- Attendance: 23,291 (803 per game)
- Scoring leader: (Sweden) Filip Ekberg (18 points)

Awards
- MVP: (Sweden) Filip Ekberg

Official website
- www.iihf.com

The 2025 IIHF U18 World Championship was the 26th such event organized by the International Ice Hockey Federation. Teams participated at several levels of competition. These tournaments also served as qualifications for the 2026 competition.

== Top Division ==
The Top Division tournament was played in the Dallas-Fort Worth Metroplex in the state of Texas, specifically in Frisco and Allen, United States, from April 23 to May 3, 2025.

=== Preliminary round ===
All times are local (Central Daylight Time; UTC-5).

==== Group A ====
Pos	Team	Pld	W	OTW	OTL	L	GF	GA	GD	Pts	Qualification
1	Canada	4	4	0	0	0	29	5	+24	12	Quarterfinals
2	Slovakia	4	2	1	0	1	17	10	+7	8	Quarterfinals
3	Finland	4	2	0	1	1	18	9	+9	7	Quarterfinals
4	Latvia	4	0	1	0	3	5	23	−18	2	Quarterfinals
5	Norway	4	0	0	1	3	4	26	−22	1	Relegation round

Source: IIHF

April 23, 2025; 12:00	Slovakia	1–0 GWS (0–0, 0–0, 0–0); OT: (0–0); SO: (1–0)	Finland	Credit Union of Texas Event Center, Allen; Attendance: 500

Game reference
Michal Prádel	Goalies	Patrik Kerkola	Referees: (Latvia) Emīls Druseiks (Czech Republic) Jiří Ondráček; Linesmen: (Czech Republic) Lukáš Rampír (Switzerland) Aurélien Urfer
Svrček; Chovan (miss); Tomík (miss); Mišiak	Shootout	(miss) Westergård; (miss) Vanhanen; (miss) Boelius; (miss) Somervuori	Referees: (Latvia) Emīls Druseiks (Czech Republic) Jiří Ondráček; Linesmen: (Czech Republic) Lukáš Rampír (Switzerland) Aurélien Urfer
4 min	Penalties	6 min	Referees: (Latvia) Emīls Druseiks (Czech Republic) Jiří Ondráček; Linesmen: (Czech Republic) Lukáš Rampír (Switzerland) Aurélien Urfer
26	Shots	34	Referees: (Latvia) Emīls Druseiks (Czech Republic) Jiří Ondráček; Linesmen: (Czech Republic) Lukáš Rampír (Switzerland) Aurélien Urfer

April 23, 2025; 16:00	Norway	1–2 GWS (1–1, 0–0, 0–0); OT: (0–0); SO: (0–1)	Latvia	Credit Union of Texas Event Center, Allen; Attendance: 435

Game reference
Felix Timraz-Westin	Goalies	Ivans Kufterins	Referees: (Switzerland) Cedric Borga (Germany) Seedo Janssen; Linesmen: (Canada) Nicholas Albinati (United States) Bryan Gorcoff
/ 0–1 / 01:43 – Klaucāns (Naudiņš) (SH); Kihl (Kionig, J. Pettersen) (PP) – 11:46 / 1–1			Referees: (Switzerland) Cedric Borga (Germany) Seedo Janssen; Linesmen: (Canada) Nicholas Albinati (United States) Bryan Gorcoff
Aaram-Olsen (miss); Eriksen (miss); Koblar (miss); Hyldmo (miss)	Shootout	Saperins; (miss) Mūrnieks; Serkins	Referees: (Switzerland) Cedric Borga (Germany) Seedo Janssen; Linesmen: (Canada) Nicholas Albinati (United States) Bryan Gorcoff
2 min	Penalties	8 min	Referees: (Switzerland) Cedric Borga (Germany) Seedo Janssen; Linesmen: (Canada) Nicholas Albinati (United States) Bryan Gorcoff
22	Shots	41	Referees: (Switzerland) Cedric Borga (Germany) Seedo Janssen; Linesmen: (Canada) Nicholas Albinati (United States) Bryan Gorcoff

April 24, 2025; 12:00	Finland	7–1 (1–0, 3–1, 3–0)	Norway	Credit Union of Texas Event Center, Allen; Attendance: 502

Game reference

Patrik Kerkola
Goalies
Olivers Freimanis
Maximillian Aas
Referees:
(Canada) Tanner Doiron
(Slovakia) Marek Žák
Linesmen:
(Canada) Brian Birkhoff
(Sweden) Mathias Naperotti

Vanhanen (Vanninen, Somervuori) – 08:15	1–0
Pakarinen (Orpana) – 25:52	2–0
Westergård (Kotajarvi, Saari) – 29:08	3–0
	3–1	29:51 – Määttänen (A. Pettersen)
Orpana (Pakarinen, Somervuori) – 34:59	4–1
Pakarinen (Westergård) – 42:47	5–1
Piiparinen – 51:28	6–1
Boelius (Vanhanen, Somervuori) (PP) – 54:27	7–1

8 min
Penalties
6 min
36
Shots
18

April 24, 2025; 16:00	Canada	9–2 (5–0, 1–1, 3–1)	Slovakia	Credit Union of Texas Event Center, Allen; Attendance: 525

Game reference

Jack Ivankovic
Goalies
Michal Prádel
Samuel Hrenák
Referees:
(Switzerland) Cedric Borga
(Finland) Janne Wuorenheimo
Linesmen:
(Finland) Luka Mäkinen
(Norway) Njaal Søstumoen

Schmidt (Katzin, Cootes) (PP) – 12:34	1–0
Katzin (Cootes, Martin) (PP) – 16:15	2–0
Smith (Schmidt, Roobroeck) – 17:11	3–0
Gard (Huang, Czata) (PP) – 18:12	4–0
Lin (Cootes, Martin) – 19:46	5–0
Schmidt (Huang, Czata) (PP) – 37:06	6–0
	6–1	38:10 – Chrenko (Nemec, Straka)
	6–2	44:48 – Chrenko (Kalman)
Beauchesne (Villeneuve, Sawchyn) – 45:31	7–2
Cootes (Martin) – 46:01	8–2
Cootes – 47:26	9–2

2 min
Penalties
8 min
40
Shots
24

April 25, 2025; 19:00	Latvia	1–7 (0–2, 0–3, 1–2)	Canada	Credit Union of Texas Event Center, Allen; Attendance: 1,237

Game reference

Ivans Kufterins
Regnārs Capars
Goalies
Lucas Beckman
Referees:
(United States) Logan Gruhl
(Sweden) Richard Magnusson
Linesmen:
(Sweden) Mathias Naperotti
(Sweden) Rasmus Strömberg

	0–1	09:03 – Smith (Martin, Nesbitt)
	0–2	16:04 – Villeneuve (Gard, Di Iorio)
	0–3	25:04 – Roobroeck (Beauchesne)
	0–4	34:42 – Carels (Cootes, Lin)
	0–5	37:05 – Di Iorio (SH)
Serkins (Šmits, Mūrnieks) (PP2) – 44:55	1–5
	1–6	48:56 – Katzin (Gard)
	1–7	50:44 – Roobroeck (Katzin, Villeneuve) (PP)

31 min
Penalties
10 min
17
Shots
28

April 26, 2025; 12:00	Norway	1–9 (0–2, 1–4, 0–3)	Slovakia	Credit Union of Texas Event Center, Allen; Attendance: 548

Game reference

Felix Timraz-Westin
Maximillian Aas
Goalies
Michal Prádel
Referees:
(Austria) Andreas Huber
(Finland) Janne Wuorenheimo
Linesmen:
(Germany) Tobias Schwenk
(Sweden) Rasmus Strömberg

	0–1	02:07 – Chovan (Radivojevič, Tomík) (PP)
	0–2	19:28 – Chrenko (Radivojevič) (PP)
	0–3	21:53 – Chrenko (Lisý) (PP)
	0–4	26:24 – Tomík (Kalis, Dúbravík)
	0–5	31:34 – Chrenko (Mišiak, Radivojevič) (PP2)
	0–6	39:12 – Chovan (Mišiak, Svrček)
Aaram-Olsen – 39:52	1–6
	1–7	54:26 – Straka (Chrenko, Nemec)
	1–8	56:11 – Chovan (Straka, Tomík) (PP)
	1–9	57:27 – Kalis

37 min
Penalties
8 min
23
Shots
37

April 26, 2025; 16:00	Latvia	2–10 (2–6, 0–2, 0–2)	Finland	Credit Union of Texas Event Center, Allen; Attendance: 482

Game reference

Regnārs Capars
Ivars Kufterins
Goalies
Patrik Kerkola
Referees:
(United States) Logan Gruhl
(Slovakia) Marek Zak
Linesmen:
(Czech Republic) David Thuma
(Switzerland) Aurelien Urfer

	0–1	02:53 — Orpana (Westergard, Sippola)
Klaucans (Gasuns, Auziņš — 04:57	1–1
	1–2	05:40 — Pakarinen (Westergard, Saari)
Auziņš (Polis, Serkins) — 06:44	2–2
	2–3	08:16 — Westergard (Orpana)
	2–4	08:33 — Pakarinen (Orpana, Piiparinen)
	2–5	11:53 — Vanninen (Boelius, Vanhanen) (PP)
	2–6	14:33 — Mensonen (Orpana, Boelius)
	2–7	34:22 — Somervuori (Vanninen, Saari)
	2–8	39:22 — Kamarainen (Sippola, Ruotsalainen)
	2–9	56:18 — Kotajarvi (Mensonen, Boelius)
	2–10	59:41 — Parssinen (Westergard)

4 min
Penalties
6 min
14
Shots
44

April 27, 2025; 16:00	Finland	1–5 (0–1, 0–3, 1–1)	Canada	Credit Union of Texas Event Center, Allen; Attendance: 842

Game reference

Patrik Kerkola
Goalies
Jack Ivankovic
Referees:
(Switzerland) Cedric Borga
(United States) Logan Gruhl
Linesmen:
(United States) Bryan Gorcoff
(Germany) Tobias Schwenk

	0–1	03:19 — Kindel (Roobroeck, Katzin) (PP)
	0–2	26:04 — Cootes (Katzin, Martin)
	0–3	26:31 — Villeneuve (Czata)
	0–4	29:39 — Reschny (Kindel, Villeneuve) (PP)
Somervuori (Boelius, Vanninen) (PP) — 44:40	1–4
	1–5	59:49 — Martin (EN)

3 min
Penalties
6 min
40
Shots
20

April 28, 2025; 12:00	Slovakia	5–0 (1–0, 1–0, 3–0)	Latvia	Credit Union of Texas Event Center, Allen; Attendance: 429

Game reference

Michal Prádel
Goalies
Ivans Kufterins
Patriks Plūmiņš
Referees:
(Canada) Taylor Burzminski
(Austria) Andreas Huber
Linesmen:
(Canada) Brian Birkhoff
(Germany) Tobias Schwenk

Nemec (Chrenko, Straka) – 03:53	1–0
Kalis (Kalman, Dúbravík) – 38:09	2–0
Nemec (Chrenko) – 40:58	3–0
Čapoš (Dúbravík, Murín) – 52:19	4–0
Tomík (EN) – 52:57	5–0

2 min
Penalties
4 min
30
Shots
18

April 28, 2025; 16:00	Canada	8–1 (2–1, 3–0, 3–0)	Norway	Credit Union of Texas Event Center, Allen; Attendance: 641

Game reference

Jack Ivankovic
Lucas Beckman
Goalies
Felix Timrad-Westin
Olivers Freimanis
Referees:
(Sweden) Richard Magnusson
(United States) Jack Young
Linesmen:
(Sweden) Mathias Naperotti
(Czech Republic) David Thuma

Roobroeck (Nesbitt Gard) — 00:39	1–0
Cootes (Roobroeck, Martin) — 04:24	2–0
	2–1	15:35 — Eriksen (Trygg)
Di Iorio (Cootes, Roobroeck) — 36:53	3–1
Katzin (Smith) — 37:36	4–1
Cootes (Roobroeck) — 39:45	5–1
Katzin (Martin, Reschny — 40:36	6–1
Reschny (Kindel, Beauchesne (SH) — 50:14	7–1
Verhoeff (Reschny, Kindel) (PP) — 55:20	8–1

10 min
Penalties
10 min
64
Shots
18

==== Group B ====
Pos	Team	Pld	W	OTW	OTL	L	GF	GA	GD	Pts	Qualification
1	United States (H)	4	4	0	0	0	25	8	+17	12	Quarterfinals
2	Sweden	4	3	0	0	1	29	16	+13	9	Quarterfinals
3	Germany	4	1	1	0	2	16	21	−5	5	Quarterfinals
4	Czechia	4	1	0	1	2	12	17	−5	4	Quarterfinals
5	Switzerland	4	0	0	0	4	9	29	−20	0	Relegation round

Source: IIHF
(H) Host

April 23, 2025; 14:00	Sweden	10–3 (2–0, 4–1, 4–2)	Switzerland	Comerica Center, Frisco; Attendance: 850

Game reference

Love Härenstam
Goalies
Matia Birchler
Referees:
(Canada) Taylor Burzminski
(United States) Jack Young
Linesmen:
(Canada) Brian Birkhoff
(Germany) Tobias Schwenk

Ekberg (Gästrin, Boumedienne) – 11:21	1–0
Nilson (Genborg, Wahlund) – 11:30	2–0
	2–1	24:08 – Schenk (Aeschlimann, Neuenschwander) (PP)
Ekberg (Klingsell, Boumedienne) (PP) – 30:33	3–1
Boumedienne (Ihs-Wozniak, Ekberg) – 32:14	4–1
Gästrin (Boumedienne, Klingsell) (PP) – 33:15	5–1
Ihs-Wozniak (Björck) (PP) – 37:08	6–1
	6–2	40:47 – Schenk (Van der Kaaij, Neuenschwander) (PP2)
Gästrin (Novotny, Boumedienne) – 42:07	7–2
Ekberg (Boumedienne) – 47:41	8–2
	8–3	52:24 – Troxler
Stenberg (Klingsell) – 53:25	9–3
Ekberg (Ihs-Wozniak) – 57:56	10–3

12 min
Penalties
20 min
47
Shots
26

April 23, 2025; 19:00	Czechia	2–4 (0–1, 1–0, 1–3)	United States	Comerica Center, Frisco; Attendance: 2,367

Game reference

Michal Oršulák
Goalies
Patrick Quinlan
Referees:
(Sweden) Richard Magnusson
(Finland) Janne Wuorenheimo
Linesmen:
(Finland) Luka Mäkinen
(Sweden) Rasmus Strömberg

	0–1	08:03 – Berchild (Mooney, Schock)
Mrtka (Oršulák) (PP) – 20:26	1–1
Záhejský (Černý) (SH) – 43:33	2–1
	2–2	55:47 – Fiddler (Mooney, Berchild)
	2–3	57:43 – Horcoff (Moore, Fiddler)
	2–4	59:53 – Kvasnicka (Murtagh) (EN)

10 min
Penalties
10 min
22
Shots
36

April 24, 2025; 14:00	Czechia	3–4 OT (2–1, 1–2, 0–0); OT: (0–1)	Germany	Comerica Center, Frisco; Attendance: 500

Game reference

Tobias Trejbal
Goalies
Lukas Stuhrmann
Referees:
(United States) Logan Gruhl
(Austria) Andreas Huber
Linesmen:
(United States) Bryan Gorcoff
(Switzerland) Aurélien Urfer

	0–1	05:22 – Schäfer (Schneider, Lewandowski)
Novotný (Benák, Malinek) – 09:31	1–1
Záhejský (Benák, Novotný) (PP2) – 16:03	2–1
	2–2	22:40 – Späth Mariscal (Ziergiebel, Zwickl)
	2–3	26:24 – Penkin (Ziergiebel) (SH)
Poletín (Benák, Novotný) (PP) – 32:47	3–3
	3–4	62:16 – Schäfer (Schneider)

8 min
Penalties
10 min
39
Shots
29

April 24, 2025; 19:00	Switzerland	0–10 (0–3, 0–6, 0–1)	United States	Comerica Center, Frisco; Attendance: 1,000

Game reference

Matia Birchler
Jovin Trachsel
Goalies
Joey Slavick
Referees:
(Germany) Seedo Janssen
(Czech Republic) Jiří Ondráček
Linesmen:
(Czech Republic) Lukáš Rampír
(Czech Republic) David Thuma

0–1	01:13 – Murtagh (Mooney, Barnett) (EA)
0–2	04:23 – Berchild (Mooney)
0–3	08:53 – McKinney (Gallant, Murtagh)
0–4	21:48 – Moore (McKinney, Bracco)
0–5	22:25 – Kevan
0–6	24:46 – Gallant (Horcoff, Potter) (PP)
0–7	26:19 – Mooney (Trethewey, Kuehne)
0–8	33:14 – McKinney (Murtagh, Barnett)
0–9	37:59 – Moore (Schock)
0–10	48:23 – Gallant (SH)

10 min
Penalties
8 min
26
Shots
50

April 25, 2025; 16:00	Germany	4–9 (0–2, 2–6, 2–1)	Sweden	Comerica Center, Frisco; Attendance: 700

Game reference

Bartholomäus Oswald
Aaron Kaiser
Goalies
Måns Goos
Referees:
(Canada) Tanner Doiron
(United States) Jack Young
Linesmen:
(Canada) Nicholas Albinati
(Czech Republic) David Thuma

	0–1	05:23 – Ihs-Wozniak (Stockselius, Wahlund)
	0–2	13:35 – Stenberg (Klingsell, Wahlund) (PP)
	0–3	22:10 – Ihs-Wozniak (Ekberg, Stockselius)
	0–4	22:38 – Gästrin (Stenberg, Boumedienne) (PP)
	0–5	23:41 – Björck (Genborg, Sjöström)
Schäfer (Schneider, T. Kose) (PP, EA) – 24:37	1–5
Willhoft (G. Griva, Späth Mariscal) (PP2) – 25:48	2–5
	2–6	31:38 – Stockselius (Ekberg)
	2–7	31:55 – Anderberg (Jennersjö, Novotny)
	2–8	37:10 – Klingsell (Ekberg, Gästrin) (PP)
	2–9	40:16 – Björck (Nilson, Genborg)
Warnecke (Willhoft) – 48:12	3–9
Schneider (Lewandowski, Händel) (PP) – 58:35	4–9

8 min
Penalties
12 min
24
Shots
57

April 26, 2025; 14:00	Switzerland	2–4 (0–0, 1–2, 1–2)	Czechia	Comerica Center, Frisco; Attendance: 750

Game reference

Jovin Trachsel
Goalies
Michal Oršulák
Referees:
(Canada) Tanner Doiron
(Latvia) Emils Druseiks
Linesmen:
(Sweden) Mathias Naperotti
(Norway) Njaal Sostumoen

	0–1	20:55 — Čihař (Pekar, Malinek)
	0–2	30:34 — Benák (Mrtka, Záhejský) (PP)
Aeschlimann — 38:41	1–2
Mundy (Aebli, Bichsel) — 40:54	2–2
	2–3	43:45 — Záhejský (Čihař, Pekar)
	2–4	59:35 — Novotný (Benák, Mrtka)

8 min
Penalties
4 min
10
Shots
38

April 26, 2025; 19:00	United States	6–3 (1–2, 3–1, 2–0)	Sweden	Comerica Center, Frisco; Attendance: 2,671

Game reference

Patrick Quinlan
Goalies
Love Härenstam
Referees:
(Canada) Taylor Burzminski
(Czech Republic) Jiří Ondráček
Linesmen:
(Canada) Nicholas Albinati
(Czech Republic) Lukáš Rampír

	0–1	07:47 — Ekberg (Nilson)
	0–2	12:15 — Stenberg (Boumedienne, Sjostrom)
Moore (Bracco, Horcoff) — 15:35	1–2
Kvasnicka (Mikey Berchild, Schock) — 22:04	2–2
	2–3	27:22 — Stenberg
Berchild (Kvasnicka, Mooney) — 38:23	3–3
Potter (Moore) — 39:06	4–3
Schock (Kvasnicka, Mooney) — 47:28	5–3
Mutryn (Mooney) (EN) — 59:58	6–3

4 min
Penalties
4 min
42
Shots
28

April 27, 2025; 12:00	Germany	5–4 (2–1, 2–1, 1–2)	Switzerland	Comerica Center, Frisco; Attendance: 572

Game reference

Lukas Stuhrmann
Goalies
Jovin Trachsel
Referees:
(Sweden) Richard Magnusson
(Slovakia) Marek Zak
Linesmen:
(Finland) Luka Mäkinen
(Norway) Njaal Sostumoen

	0–1	12:13 — Nappiot (van der Kaaij, Mundy) (PP)
Handel (G. Griva) — 17:36	1–1
Handel (PP) — 17:55	2–1
Lewandowski (Schneider, Handel) (PP) — 28:42	3–1
	3–2	30:00 — Aeschlimann (Neuenschwander)
Willhoft (PS) — 35:51	4–2
	4–3	46:37 — Franzina (Mundy, Pedrotti)
	4–4	51:14 — Schenk (Pedrotti, Neuenschwander) (PP)
Späth-Mariscal (Penkin, Ziergiebel) — 56:43	5–4

4 min
Penalties
4 min
32
Shots
42

April 28, 2025; 14:00	Sweden	7–3 (3–1, 2–1, 2–1)	Czechia	Comerica Center, Frisco; Attendance: 537

Game reference

Måns Goos
Goalies
Michal Oršulák
František Poletín
Referees:
(Germany) Seedo Janssen
(Finland) Janne Wuorenheimo
Linesmen:
(United States) Bryan Gorcoff
(Finland) Luka Mäkinen

Ekberg (Björck, Gästrin) — 04:05	1–0
Klingsell (Ekberg, Boumedienne) (PP) — 06:39	2–0
Ekberg (Klingsell, Boumedienne) (PP) — 08:45	3–0
	3–1	16:03 — Matejovský (Mikeš, Rozsíval)
	3–2	29:28 — Záhejský (Benák, Novotný) (PP)
Nilson (Stockselius, Hallquisth) — 31:59	4–2
Ihs-Wozniak (Frondell, Stenberg) — 38:10	5–2
Frondell (Stenberg, Boumedienne) — 40:30	6–2
	6–3	43:28 — T. Poletín (Pekar, Čihař)
Stenberg (Ekberg, Boumedienne) (PP) — 52:45	7–3

18 min
Penalties
36 min
38
Shots
37

April 28, 2025; 19:00	United States	5–3 (1–1, 3–2, 1–0)	Germany	Comerica Center, Frisco; Attendance: 825

Game reference

Patrick Quinlan
Goalies
Aaron Kaiser
Referees:
(Switzerland) Cedric Borga
(Latvia) Emils Druseiks
Linesmen:
(Canada) Nicholas Albinati
(Switzerland) Aurélein Urfer

	0–1	08:22 — Willhoft (G. Griva, Bleicher)
Barnett (Mutryn, Kevan) — 11:03	1–1
	1–2	23:16 — Schneider (Kruger, Brandt
Berchild (Schock, Potter) (PP) — 25:23	2–2
	2–3	28:42 — G. Griva (Willhoft, R. Griva)
Horcoff (Moore, Potter) — 35:22	3–3
Gallant (SH) — 36:32	4–3
Gallant (EN) — 59:58	5–3

4 min
Penalties
4 min
37
Shots
25

=== Relegation round ===
April 30, 2025; 20:00	Norway	5–4 GWS (2–1, 1–2, 1–1); OT: (0–0); SO: (1–0)	Switzerland	Credit Union of Texas Event Center, Allen; Attendance: 301

Game reference

Felix Timraz-Westin
Goalies
Matia Birchler
Referees:
(United States) Logan Gruhl
(Finland) Janne Wuorenheimo
Linesmen:
(Finland) Luka Mäkinen
(Sweden) Mathias Naperotti

Eriksen (Aaram-Olsen, Määttänen) (PP) – 04:46	1–0
Aaram-Olsen (Eriksen, Trygg) – 15:37	2–0
	2–1	17:44 – Franzina (Aebli, Mundy)
Aaram-Olsen (Hjelmås, Koblar) (PP) – 23:43	3–1
	3–2	27:25 – Schenk (Peter, Aeschlimann)
	3–3	32:04 – Peter (Schenk, N. Lehmann)
	3–4	43:08 – Aeschlimann (Moret, Troxler)
Kionig (Eriksen, Aaram-Olsen) – 51:16	4–4

Aaram-Olsen (miss)
Eriksen (miss)
J. Pettersen (miss)
Koblar (miss)
Trygg
Trygg
Shootout
(miss) Schenk
(miss) Franzina
(miss) Mundy
Peter
(miss) Aeschlimann
(miss) Peter
4 min
Penalties
6 min
39
Shots
38

=== Playoff round ===
Winning teams in the quarterfinals will be reseeded according to their ranking:

1. higher position in the group
2. higher number of points
3. better goal difference
4. higher number of goals scored for
5. better seeding coming into the tournament (final placement at the 2024 IIHF World U18 Championships).

Rank	Team	Group	Pos	Pts	GD	GF	Seed
1	Canada	A	1	12	+24	29	1
2	United States	B	1	12	+17	25	2
3	Sweden	B	2	9	+13	29	3
4	Slovakia	A	2	8	+7	17	4
5	Finland	A	3	6	+9	18	5
6	Germany	B	3	5	−5	16	10
7	Czechia	B	4	4	−5	12	6
8	Latvia	A	4	2	−18	5	8

==== Bracket ====
Quarter-finals
April 30 – Frisco
1B United States	6
4A Latvia	3
April 30 – Allen
2A Slovakia	3
3B Germany	2
April 30 – Allen
1A Canada (OT)	3
4B Czechia	2
April 30 – Frisco
2B Sweden	7
3A Finland	2

Semi-finals
May 2 – Frisco
1 Canada	4
4 Slovakia	0
May 2 – Frisco
2 United States	3
3 Sweden	4

Final
May 3 – Frisco
1 Canada	7
3 Sweden	0
Third place
May 3 – Frisco
2 United States (OT)	4
4 Slovakia	3

==== Quarterfinals ====
April 30, 2025; 12:00	Slovakia	3–2 (0–0, 1–0, 2–2)	Germany	Credit Union of Texas Event Center, Allen; Attendance: 641

Game reference

Michal Prádel
Goalies
Lukas Stuhrmann
Referees:
(Switzerland) Cedric Borga
(Latvia) Emīls Druseiks
Linesmen:
(Canada) Nicholas Albinati
(Switzerland) Aurélien Urfer

Chovan (Mišiak, Radivojevič) – 36:19	1–0
Tomka (Tomík, Rusznyák) – 46:12	2–0
Radivojevič (Svrček, Chovan) (PP) – 47:00	3–0
	3–1	53:29 – Bleicher (Späth Mariscal, Grin)
	3–2	59:22 – Penkin (G. Griva, Späth Mariscal) (EA)

4 min
Penalties
4 min
36
Shots
23

April 30, 2025; 14:00	Sweden	7–2 (2–1, 2–0, 3–1)	Finland	Comerica Center, Frisco; Attendance: 521

Game reference

Love Härenstam
Goalies
Patrik Kerkola
Jooa Sammalniemi
Referees:
(Canada) Taylor Burzminski
(Czech Republic) Jiří Ondráček
Linesmen:
(Canada) Brian Birkhoff
(Czech Republic) Lukáš Rampír

Ihs-Wozniak (Stenberg, Frondell) – 00:26	1–0
Björck (Ekberg, Boumedienne) – 04:31	2–0
	2–1	07:13 – Vanhanen (Somervuori)
Ekberg (Stenberg, Boumedienne) (PP) – 24:51	3–1
Stenberg – 35:44	4–1
Brøngel-Larsson (Stockselius, Klingsell) – 43:00	5–1
Ekberg (Gästrin) – 49:31	6–1
	6–2	54:12 – Vanninen (Vanhanen, Boelius) (PP, EA)
Stenberg (Jennersjö) (EN) – 58:24	7–2

22 min
Penalties
4 min
30
Shots
30

April 30, 2025; 16:00	Canada	3–2 OT (1–1, 1–1, 0–0); OT: (1–0)	Czechia	Credit Union of Texas Event Center, Allen; Attendance: 482

Game reference

Jack Ivankovic
Goalies
František Poletín
Referees:
(Austria) Andreas Huber
(Sweden) Richard Magnusson
Linesmen:
(United States) Bryan Gorcoff
(Sweden) Rasmus Strömberg

	0–1	06:06 – Rozsíval (Mrtka, Kucharčík)
Smith – 19:40	1–1
	1–2	35:07 – Benák (Novotný)
Reschny (Martin, Huang) – 35:52	2–2
Reschny (Verhoeff) – 62:41	3–2

8 min
Penalties
6 min
40
Shots
24

April 30, 2025; 19:00	United States	6–3 (2–0, 2–2, 2–1)	Latvia	Comerica Center, Frisco; Attendance: 711

Game reference

Joey Slavick
Goalies
Ivans Kufterins
Referees:
(Canada) Tanner Doiron
(Slovakia) Marek Žák
Linesmen:
(Norway) Njaal Søstumoen
(Czech Republic) David Thuma

Potter (Lindberg, Barnett) – 05:37	1–0
Gallant (McKinney, Murtagh) – 08:19	2–0
Murtagh (Mooney) – 27:23	3–0
	3–1	32:15 – Serkins (Šmits, Flugins) (PP)
	3–2	33:04 – Šmits (Serkins, Mūrnieks) (PP)
Barnett (Moore) – 35:53	4–2
Mooney (Berchild) – 52:25	5–2
	5–3	55:41 – Flugins (Laugalis, Serkins)
Potter (Mooney) (EN) – 58:41	6–3

8 min
Penalties
6 min
39
Shots
22

==== Semifinals ====
May 2, 2025; 15:00	Canada	4–0 (0–0, 1–0, 3–0)	Slovakia	Comerica Center, Frisco; Attendance: 617

Game reference

Jack Ivankovic
Goalies
Michal Prádel
Referees:
(Sweden) Richard Magnusson
(Finland) Janne Wuorenheimo
Linesmen:
(Finland) Luka Mäkinen
(Sweden) Rasmus Strömberg

Villeneuve (Czata) – 21:52	1–0
Reschny (Cootes, Verhoeff) (PP) – 41:34	2–0
Nesbitt (Kindel, Katzin) (PP) – 46:19	3–0
Roobroeck (Verhoeff, Villeneuve) (PP) – 58:00	4–0

31 min
Penalties
26 min
39
Shots
24

May 2, 2025; 19:00	United States	3–4 (0–0, 2–2, 1–2)	Sweden	Comerica Center, Frisco; Attendance: 1,103

Game reference

Patrick Quinlan
Goalies
Love Härenstam
Referees:
(Canada) Taylor Burzminski
(Czech Republic) Jiří Ondráček
Linesmen:
(Canada) Brian Birkhoff
(Czech Republic) Lukáš Rampír

Lindberg (Schock, Potter) – 25:14	1–0
	1–1	28:25 – Ekberg (Björck, Gästrin)
	1–2	30:13 – Stenberg
Schock – 34:53	2–2
	2–3	47:27 – Björck (Ekberg, Gästrin)
	2–4	53:22 – Jennersjö (Björck, Nilson)
Potter (Lindberg, Moore) – 55:36	3–4

0 min
Penalties
4 min
41
Shots
23

==== Bronze medal game ====
May 3, 2025; 14:30	United States	4–3 OT (1–0, 0–2, 2–1); OT: (1–0)	Slovakia	Comerica Center, Frisco; Attendance: 671

Game reference

Patrick Quinlan
Goalies
Michal Prádel
Referees:
(Sweden) Richard Magnusson
(Finland) Janne Wuorenheimo
Linesmen:
(Finland) Luka Mäkinen
(Sweden) Rasmus Strömberg

Fiddler (Barnett, Moore) – 11:53	1–0
	1–1	35:38 – Svrček (Chovan, Radivojevič)
	1–2	37:29 – Svrček (Kazda, Chovan)
Kvasnicka (Moore) – 41:13	2–2
McKinney (Moore, Bracco) (PP) – 52:34	3–2
	3–3	53:13 – Chovan (Lisý, Kazda)
Kevan (Mikey Berchild, Lindberg) – 65:37	4–3

6 min
Penalties
4 min
33
Shots
26

==== Gold medal game ====
May 3, 2025; 19:00	Canada	7–0 (2–0, 3–0, 2–0)	Sweden	Comerica Center, Frisco; Attendance: 1,331

Game reference

Jack Ivankovic
Goalies
Love Härenstam
Måns Goos
Referees:
(Canada) Taylor Burzminski
(Czech Republic) Jiří Ondráček
Linesmen:
(Canada) Brian Birkhoff
(Czech Republic) Lukáš Rampír

Villeneuve – 04:06	1–0
Martin (Reschny, Beauchesne) – 12:31	2–0
Smith (Katzin) – 24:56	3–0
Czata (Kindel) – 29:35	4–0
Martin (Nesbitt, Verhoeff) – 32:54	5–0
Cootes (Hopkins, Schmidt) – 41:12	6–0
Nesbitt (Kindel, Huang) (PP) – 52:33	7–0

8 min
Penalties
14 min
42
Shots
28

=== Final standings ===
Pos	Grp	Team	Pld	W	OTW	OTL	L	GF	GA	GD	Pts	Final Result
1	A	Canada	7	6	1	0	0	43	7	+36	20	Champions
2	B	Sweden	7	4	1	0	2	40	28	+12	14	Runners-up
3	B	United States (H)	7	5	1	0	1	38	18	+20	17	Third place
4	A	Slovakia	7	3	1	1	2	23	20	+3	12	Fourth place
5	A	Finland	5	2	0	1	2	20	16	+4	7	Eliminated in Quarterfinals
6	B	Germany	5	1	1	0	3	18	24	−6	5	Eliminated in Quarterfinals
7	B	Czechia	5	1	0	2	2	14	20	−6	5	Eliminated in Quarterfinals
8	A	Latvia	5	0	1	0	4	8	29	−21	2	Eliminated in Quarterfinals
9	A	Norway	5	0	1	1	3	9	30	−21	3	Avoided relegation
10	B	Switzerland	5	0	0	1	4	13	34	−21	1	Relegated to the 2026 Division I A

Source: IIHF
(H) Host

=== Awards and statistics ===
==== Awards ====
- Best players selected by the directorate:
  - Best Goaltender: (Canada) Jack Ivankovic
  - Best Defenceman: (Sweden) Sascha Boumedienne
  - Best Forward: (Sweden) Filip Ekberg
- Media All-Stars:
  - MVP: (Sweden) Filip Ekberg
  - Goaltender: (Canada) Jack Ivankovic
  - Defencemen: (Sweden) Sascha Boumedienne / (United States) Drew Schock
  - Forwards: (Sweden) Filip Ekberg / (Sweden) Ivar Stenberg / (Canada) Brady Martin

==== Scoring leaders ====
Pos	Player	Country	GP	G	A	Pts	+/−	PIM
1	Filip Ekberg	Sweden	7	10	8	18	+6	6
2	Sascha Boumedienne	Sweden	7	1	13	14	+5	2
3	Ivar Stenberg	Sweden	7	8	5	13	+0	4
4	Braeden Cootes	Canada	7	6	6	12	+7	0
5	Brady Martin	Canada	7	3	8	11	+15	29
5	Will Moore	United States	7	3	8	11	+9	2
7	L.J. Mooney	United States	7	2	9	11	+10	4
8	Lev Katzin	Canada	7	4	6	10	+13	2
9	Milton Gästrin	Sweden	7	3	7	10	-1	2
10	Ryan Roobroeck	Canada	7	4	5	9	+7	0

GP = Games played; G = Goals; A = Assists; Pts = Points; +/− = Plus–minus; PIM = Penalties In Minutes
Source: IIHF

==== Goaltending leaders ====
(minimum 40% team's total ice time)

Pos	Player	Country	TOI	GA	GAA	SA	Sv%	SO
1	Jack Ivankovic	Canada	342:41	6	1.05	153	96.08	2
2	Michal Prádel	Slovakia	390:03	16	2.46	186	91.40	2
3	Lukas Stuhrmann	Germany	180:55	10	3.32	116	91.38	0
4	Love Härenstam	Sweden	277:52	18	3.89	150	89.29	0
5	Felix Timraz-Westin	Norway	215:00	16	4.47	149	89.26	0

TOI = Time on ice (minutes:seconds); GA = Goals against; GAA = Goals against average; SA = Shots against; Sv% = Save percentage; SO = Shutouts
Source: IIHF

== Division I ==
=== Group A ===
The Division I Group A tournament was played in Székesfehérvár, Hungary from 20 to 26 April 2025.

Pos	Team	Pld	W	OTW	OTL	L	GF	GA	GD	Pts	Promotion or relegation
1	Denmark	5	5	0	0	0	24	10	+14	15	Promoted to the 2026 Top Division
2	Ukraine	5	4	0	0	1	24	12	+12	12	
3	Kazakhstan	5	2	0	1	2	14	13	+1	7	
4	Slovenia	5	1	1	0	3	8	17	−9	5	
5	Hungary (H)	5	1	0	0	4	8	21	−13	3 (Note: Austria 3–4 Hungary)	
6	Austria	5	1	0	0	4	15	20	−5	3	Relegated to the 2026 Division I B

Source: IIHF
Rules for classification: 1) points; 2) head-to-head points; 3) head-to-head goal difference; 4) head-to-head number of goals scored; 5) result against closest best-ranked team outside tied teams; 6) result against second-best ranked team outside tied teams; 7) seeding before tournament.
(H) Host

=== Group B ===
The Division I Group B tournament was played in Kaunas, Lithuania from 13 to 19 April 2025.

Pos	Team	Pld	W	OTW	OTL	L	GF	GA	GD	Pts	Promotion or relegation
1	Poland	5	3	1	0	1	19	12	+7	11	Promoted to the 2026 Division I A
2	Lithuania (H)	5	3	0	0	2	21	14	+7	9 (Note: Lithuania 7–4 South Korea)	
3	South Korea	5	3	0	0	2	21	16	+5	9	
4	France	5	2	0	1	2	12	12	0	7	
5	Estonia	5	1	1	0	3	8	20	−12	5	
6	Japan	5	1	0	1	3	11	18	−7	4	Relegated to the 2026 Division II A

Source: IIHF
Rules for classification: 1) points; 2) head-to-head points; 3) head-to-head goal difference; 4) head-to-head number of goals scored; 5) result against closest best-ranked team outside tied teams; 6) result against second-best ranked team outside tied teams; 7) seeding before tournament.
(H) Host

== Division II ==
=== Group A ===
The Division II Group A tournament was played in Asiago, Italy from 13 to 19 April 2025 as a test event of the 2026 Winter Olympics.

Pos	Team	Pld	W	OTW	OTL	L	GF	GA	GD	Pts	Promotion or relegation
1	Italy (H)	5	5	0	0	0	23	7	+16	15	Promoted to the 2026 Division I B
2	Great Britain	5	4	0	0	1	12	4	+8	12	
3	China	5	2	0	1	2	13	14	−1	7	
4	Croatia	5	1	1	1	2	14	14	0	6	
5	Romania	5	1	1	0	3	10	17	−7	5	
6	Netherlands	5	0	0	0	5	7	23	−16	0	Relegated to the 2026 Division II B

Source: IIHF
Rules for classification: 1) points; 2) head-to-head points; 3) head-to-head goal difference; 4) head-to-head number of goals scored; 5) result against closest best-ranked team outside tied teams; 6) result against second-best ranked team outside tied teams; 7) seeding before tournament.
(H) Host

=== Group B ===
The Division II Group B tournament was played in Sofia, Bulgaria from 17 to 23 March 2025.

Pos	Team	Pld	W	OTW	OTL	L	GF	GA	GD	Pts	Promotion or relegation
1	Spain	5	4	1	0	0	21	7	+14	14	Promoted to the 2026 Division II A
2	Australia	5	2	1	1	1	21	19	+2	9	
3	Chinese Taipei	5	1	1	2	1	16	19	−3	7 (Note: Chinese Taipei 6–5 (OT) Belgium)	
4	Belgium	5	2	0	1	2	25	18	+7	7	
5	Serbia	5	2	0	0	3	15	16	−1	6	
6	Bulgaria (H)	5	0	1	0	4	8	27	−19	2	Relegated to the 2026 Division III A

Source: IIHF
Rules for classification: 1) points; 2) head-to-head points; 3) head-to-head goal difference; 4) head-to-head number of goals scored; 5) result against closest best-ranked team outside tied teams; 6) result against second-best ranked team outside tied teams; 7) seeding before tournament.
(H) Host

== Division III ==
=== Group A ===
The Division III Group A tournament was played in Mexico City, Mexico from 2 to 8 March 2025.

Pos	Team	Pld	W	OTW	OTL	L	GF	GA	GD	Pts	Promotion or relegation
1	Mexico (H)	5	5	0	0	0	33	12	+21	15	Promoted to the 2026 Division II B
2	Turkey	5	3	0	0	2	25	24	+1	9	
3	Israel	5	2	1	0	2	31	27	+4	8	
4	Hong Kong	5	2	0	1	2	34	18	+16	7	
5	New Zealand	5	1	0	0	4	18	41	−23	3 (Note: Iceland 2–6 New Zealand)	
6	Iceland	5	1	0	0	4	13	32	−19	3	Relegated to the 2026 Division III B

Source: IIHF
Rules for classification: 1) points; 2) head-to-head points; 3) head-to-head goal difference; 4) head-to-head number of goals scored; 5) result against closest best-ranked team outside tied teams; 6) result against second-best ranked team outside tied teams; 7) seeding before tournament.
(H) Host

=== Group B ===
The Division III Group B tournament was played in Bangkok, Thailand from 28 February to 6 March 2025.

Pos	Team	Pld	W	OTW	OTL	L	GF	GA	GD	Pts	Promotion
1	Uzbekistan	5	5	0	0	0	46	8	+38	15	Promoted to the 2026 Division III A
2	Thailand (H)	5	4	0	0	1	40	6	+34	12	
3	Turkmenistan	5	3	0	0	2	36	23	+13	9	
4	Bosnia and Herzegovina	5	1	1	0	3	14	39	−25	5	
5	South Africa	5	1	0	0	4	18	47	−29	3	
6	Luxembourg	5	0	0	1	4	12	43	−31	1	

Source: IIHF
Rules for classification: 1) points; 2) head-to-head points; 3) head-to-head goal difference; 4) head-to-head number of goals scored; 5) result against closest best-ranked team outside tied teams; 6) result against second-best ranked team outside tied teams; 7) seeding before tournament.
(H) Host
