= 2024 Hlinka Gretzky Cup =

U18 international ice hockey tournament

Tournament details
- Host country: Canada
- Venues: 2 (in 1 host city)
- Dates: August 5–10
- Teams: 8

Final positions
- Champions: Canada (25th title)
- Runners-up: Czech Republic
- Third place: Sweden
- Fourth place: United States

Tournament statistics
- Games played: 18
- Goals scored: 122 (6.78 per game)
- Scoring leader: (Sweden) Viktor Klingsell (12 points)

Official website
- hlinkagretzkycup.ca

The 2024 Hlinka Gretzky Cup was an under-18 international ice hockey tournament that was held from August 5 to August 10, 2024 at Rogers Place and Downtown Community Arena in Edmonton, Alberta.

== Preliminary round ==
All times are local (Mountain Daylight Time – UTC-6).

=== Group A ===
| Pos | Team | Pld | W | OTW | OTL | L | GF | GA | GD | Pts | Qualification |
|---|---|---|---|---|---|---|---|---|---|---|---|
| 1 | Canada (H) | 3 | 3 | 0 | 0 | 0 | 17 | 2 | +15 | 9 | Semifinals |
| 2 | Sweden | 3 | 1 | 1 | 0 | 1 | 17 | 6 | +11 | 5 | Semifinals |
| 3 | Slovakia | 3 | 0 | 1 | 1 | 1 | 7 | 11 | −4 | 3 | Fifth place game |
| 4 | Switzerland | 3 | 0 | 0 | 1 | 2 | 3 | 25 | −22 | 1 | Seventh place game |

Source: hlinkagretzkycup.ca
(H) Host

| August 5, 2024; 12:00 | Slovakia | 3–4 OT (0–1, 1–2, 2–0); OT: (0–1) | Sweden | Rogers Place, Edmonton |

Game reference
| Michal Prádel | Goalies | Love Härenstam |
| 16 min | Penalties | 14 min |
| 29 | Shots | 46 |

| August 5, 2024; 19:30 | Switzerland | 0–10 (0–3, 0–4, 0–3) | Canada | Rogers Place, Edmonton |

Game reference
| Matia Birchler | Goalies | Jack Ivankovic |
| 6 min | Penalties | 6 min |
| 20 | Shots | 50 |

| August 6, 2024; 17:30 | Sweden | 12–1 (4–0, 4–0, 4–1) | Switzerland | Downtown Community Arena, Edmonton |

Game reference
| Love Harenstam | Goalies | Jovin Trachsel |
| 4 min | Penalties | 12 min |
| 55 | Shots | 19 |

| August 6, 2024; 19:30 | Canada | 5–1 (2–0, 1–1, 2–0) | Slovakia | Rogers Place, Edmonton |

Game reference
| Lucas Beckman | Goalies | Michal Pradel, Roberto Leonardo Henriquez |
| 35 min | Penalties | 12 min |
| 44 | Shots | 28 |

| August 7, 2024; 17:30 | Switzerland | 2–3 OT (0–2, 0–0, 2–0); OT: (0–1) | Slovakia | Downtown Community Arena, Edmonton |

Game reference
| Matia Birchler | Goalies | Roberto Leonardo Henriquez |
| 10 min | Penalties | 6 min |
| 29 | Shots | 44 |

| August 7, 2024; 19:30 | Sweden | 1–2 (0–1, 0–0, 1–1) | Canada | Rogers Place, Edmonton |

Game reference
| Isak Sorqvist | Goalies | Jack Ivankovic |
| 8 min | Penalties | 8 min |
| 24 | Shots | 30 |

=== Group B ===
| Pos | Team | Pld | W | OTW | OTL | L | GF | GA | GD | Pts | Qualification |
|---|---|---|---|---|---|---|---|---|---|---|---|
| 1 | Czech Republic | 3 | 3 | 0 | 0 | 0 | 13 | 5 | +8 | 9 | Semifinals |
| 2 | United States | 3 | 2 | 0 | 0 | 1 | 16 | 6 | +10 | 6 | Semifinals |
| 3 | Germany | 3 | 0 | 1 | 0 | 2 | 8 | 20 | −12 | 2 | Fifth place game |
| 4 | Finland | 3 | 0 | 0 | 1 | 2 | 3 | 9 | −6 | 1 | Seventh place game |

Source: hlinkagretzkycup.ca

| August 5, 2024; 13:00 | Germany | 2–1 OT (0–0, 0–1, 1–0); OT: (1–0) | Finland | Downtown Community Arena, Edmonton |

Game reference
| Lukas Stuhrmann | Goalies | Patrik Kerkola |
| 6 min | Penalties | 8 min |
| 27 | Shots | 35 |

| August 5, 2024; 15:30 | United States | 1–2 (1–0, 0–1, 0–1) | Czech Republic | Rogers Place, Edmonton |

Game reference
| Ryan Cameron | Goalies | Ondrej Stebetak |
| 12 min | Penalties | 8 min |
| 31 | Shots | 21 |

| August 6, 2024; 12:00 | Germany | 3–7 (1–3, 1–3, 1–1) | Czech Republic | Rogers Place, Edmonton |

Game reference
| Aaron Kaiser | Goalies | Michal Orsulak |
| 10 min | Penalties | 10 min |
| 22 | Shots | 47 |

| August 6, 2024; 15:30 | Finland | 1–3 (0–2, 1–0, 0–1) | United States | Rogers Place, Edmonton |

Game reference
| Patrik Kerkola | Goalies | Ryan Cameron |
| 14 min | Penalties | 10 min |
| 14 | Shots | 29 |

| August 7, 2024; 12:00 | Czech Republic | 4–1 (0–0, 2–0, 2–1) | Finland | Rogers Place, Edmonton |

Game reference
| Ondrej Stebetak | Goalies | Jooa Sammalniemi |
| 8 min | Penalties | 6 min |
| 23 | Shots | 18 |

| August 7, 2024; 15:30 | United States | 12–3 (2–0, 6–0, 4–3) | Germany | Rogers Place, Edmonton |

Game reference
| Charles Menard, Carter Casey | Goalies | Aaron Kaiser, Lukas Stuhrmann |
| 10 min | Penalties | 14 min |
| 54 | Shots | 15 |

== Final round ==
=== Bracket ===
Semifinals
9 August
A1 Canada | 5
B2 United States | 1
9 August
B1 Czech Republic | 5
A2 Sweden | 1

Final
10 August
W1 Canada | 2
W2 Czech Republic | 1
Third place game
10 August
L1 United States | 3
L2 Sweden | 6

=== Seventh place game ===
| August 9, 2024; 13:00 | Switzerland | 2–5 (1–1, 1–1, 0–3) | Finland | Downtown Community Arena, Edmonton |

Game reference
| Jovin Trachsel | Goalies | Patrik Kerkola |
| 6 min | Penalties | 2 min |
| 24 | Shots | 40 |

=== Fifth place game ===
| August 9, 2024; 12:00 | Slovakia | 5–2 (0–0, 1–0, 4–2) | Germany | Rogers Place, Edmonton |

Game reference
| Michal Pradel | Goalies | Lukas Stuhrmann |
| 2 min | Penalties | 2 min |
| 24 | Shots | 18 |

=== Semifinals ===
| August 9, 2024; 15:30 | Sweden | 1–5 (1–0, 0–3, 0–2) | Czech Republic | Rogers Place, Edmonton |

Game reference
| Love Harenstam | Goalies | Ondrej Stebetak |
| 14 min | Penalties | 8 min |
| 19 | Shots | 28 |

| August 9, 2024; 19:30 | United States | 1–5 (0–1, 1–2, 0–2) | Canada | Rogers Place, Edmonton |

Game reference
| Ryan Cameron | Goalies | Jack Ivankovic |
| 6 min | Penalties | 8 min |
| 29 | Shots | 35 |

=== Bronze medal game ===
| August 10, 2024; 13:30 | Sweden | 6–3 (2–1, 1–1, 3–1) | United States | Rogers Place, Edmonton |

Game reference

Love Harenstam
Goalies
Ryan Cameron, Charles Menard

| | 0–1 | 01:08 – Lansing (Murphy, Rombach) |
| Novotny (Nilson, Klingsell) – 11:53 | 1–1 |
| Ihs-Wozniak (Vass, Björck) – 16:15 | 2–1 |
| Nilson (Genborg, Bröngel-Larsson) – 21:44 | 3–1 |
| | 3–2 | 24:51 – Lansing (Hayes, Mutryn) |
| Nilson (Drott) – 46:35 | 4–2 |
| Novotny (Genborg, Sjöström) – 48:53 | 5–2 |
| Nilson (EN) – 58:45 | 6–2 |
| | 6–3 | 59:52 – Orlowsky (Fiddler, Moe) (PP) |

10 min
Penalties
6 min
30
Shots
37

=== Final ===
| August 10, 2024; 18:00 | Czech Republic | 1–2 (0–2, 0–0, 1–0) | Canada | Rogers Place, Edmonton |

Game reference

Ondrej Stebetak
Goalies
Jack Ivankovic

| | 0–1 | 06:29 – Kilfoil (Martin, Reid) |
| | 0–2 | 19:08 – Desnoyers (Schmidt, Guité) |
| Poletin (Pavlik, Benák) (PP) – 59:51 | 1–2 |

6 min
Penalties
12 min
19
Shots
26

== Final standings ==
| Rank | Team |
|---|---|
| 1st place, gold medalist(s) | Canada |
| 2nd place, silver medalist(s) | Czech Republic |
| 3rd place, bronze medalist(s) | Sweden |
| 4 | United States |
| 5 | Slovakia |
| 6 | Germany |
| 7 | Finland |
| 8 | Switzerland |
