= 2023 World U-17 Hockey Challenge =

Tournament details
- Host country: Canada
- Venue(s): 2 (in 2 host cities)
- Dates: November 2–11, 2023
- Teams: 6

Final positions
- Champions: Canada White
- Runners-up: United States
- Third place: Sweden
- Fourth place: Czech Republic

Tournament statistics
- Games played: 22
- Goals scored: 157 (7.14 per game)
- Scoring leader(s): (United States) Will Moore (12 points)

The 2023 World Under-17 Hockey Challenge was an ice hockey tournament that was held in Charlottetown and Summerside, Prince Edward Island, Canada from November 2 to 11, 2023. It was the 30th edition of the tournament.

== Venues ==
Charlottetown and Summerside, Prince Edward Island were the tournament hosts.

Charlottetown	2023 World U-17 Hockey Challenge is located in Canada	Summerside
Eastlink Centre Capacity: 3,717	2023 World U-17 Hockey Challenge is located in Canada	Credit Union Place Capacity: 4,228

== Teams ==
Unlike prior tournaments, there were two Canadian teams (Canada White and Canada Red) as opposed to three. Russia was not allowed to participate in the tournament due to the invasion of Ukraine.

== Preliminary round ==
All listed times are local (UTC-5).

Pos	Team	Pld	W	OTW	OTL	L	GF	GA	GD	Pts	Qualification
1	United States	5	3	0	2	0	29	15	+14	11	Advance to Semifinals
2	Sweden	5	3	0	1	1	21	19	+2	10	Advance to Semifinals
3	Canada Red (H)	5	1	2	0	2	16	20	−4	7	Advance to Quarterfinals
4	Finland	5	2	0	1	2	15	19	−4	7	Advance to Quarterfinals
5	Czech Republic	5	1	1	0	3	15	21	−6	5	Advance to Quarterfinals
6	Canada White (H)	5	0	2	1	2	17	19	−2	5	Advance to Quarterfinals

Source: Hockey Canada
(H) Host

November 2, 2023; 12:00	Czech Republic	4–3 GWS (1–1, 0–2, 2–0); OT: (0–0); SO: (1–0)	Canada White	Credit Union Place, Summerside

Game reference
8 min	Penalties	8 min
34	Shots	29

November 2, 2023; 19:00	Finland	2–3 GWS (1–1, 0–1, 1–0); OT: (0–0); SO: (0–1)	Canada Red	Eastlink Centre, Charlottetown; Attendance: 1540

Game reference
6 min	Penalties	10 min
26	Shots	35

November 2, 2023; 19:00	Sweden	2–5 (1–1, 1–1, 0–3)	United States	Credit Union Place, Summerside

Game reference
6 min	Penalties	4 min
21	Shots	22

November 3, 2023; 15:00	United States	10–2 (3–1, 7–0, 0–1)	Czech Republic	Credit Union Place, Summerside

Game reference
16 min	Penalties	10 min
36	Shots	21

November 3, 2023; 19:00	Sweden	3–2 (1–1, 2–1, 0–0)	Finland	Eastlink Centre, Charlottetown

Game reference
25 min	Penalties	4 min
30	Shots	23

November 3, 2023; 19:00	Canada Red	4–3 (1–2, 1–0, 2–1)	Canada White	Credit Union Place, Summerside

Game reference
6 min	Penalties	18 min
27	Shots	24

November 4, 2023; 15:00	Czech Republic	4–0 (1–0, 0–0, 3–0)	Canada Red	Eastlink Centre, Charlottetown

Game reference

November 4, 2023; 19:00	Finland	3–8 (2–3, 1–3, 0–2)	United States	Credit Union Place, Summerside

Game reference
18 min	Penalties	26 min
31	Shots	44

November 4, 2023; 19:00	Canada White	4–3 OT (1–0, 1–3, 1–0); OT: (1–0)	Sweden	Eastlink Centre, Charlottetown

Game reference
4 min	Penalties	10 min
29	Shots	27

November 6, 2023; 12:00	Czech Republic	2–3 (0–1, 1–2, 1–0)	Finland	Eastlink Centre, Charlottetown

Game reference
6 min	Penalties	14 min
33	Shots	19

November 6, 2023; 19:00	Canada White	4–3 GWS (1–1, 0–2, 2–0); OT: (0–0); SO: (1–0)	United States	Credit Union Place, Summerside

Game reference
4 min	Penalties	12 min
42	Shots	33

November 6, 2023; 12:00	Canada Red	5–8 (1–5, 2–3, 2–0)	Sweden	Eastlink Centre, Charlottetown

Game reference
5 min	Penalties	8 min
41	Shots	35

November 7, 2023; 15:00	Sweden	5–3 (4–1, 0–2, 1–0)	Czech Republic	Credit Union Place, Summerside

Game reference
12 min	Penalties	4 min
35	Shots	21

November 7, 2023; 19:00	United States	3–4 OT (2–0, 0–2, 1–1); OT: (0–1)	Canada Red	Eastlink Centre, Charlottetown

Game reference
8 min	Penalties	8 min
27	Shots	42

November 7, 2023; 19:00	Finland	5–3 (2–0, 1–0, 2–3)	Canada White	Credit Union Place, Summerside

Game reference
12 min	Penalties	6 min
32	Shots	41

== Playoff round ==
=== Bracket ===
Quarterfinals
November 9 – Summerside
4 Finland	0
3 Czech Republic	2
November 9 – Charlottetown
3 Canada Red	2
6 Canada White (OT)	3

Semifinals
November 10 – Charlottetown
1 United States (OT)	5
5 Czech Republic	4
November 10 – Summerside
2 Sweden	1
6 Canada White	6

Gold Medal Game
November 11 – Charlottetown
1 United States	1
6 Canada White (OT)	2
Bronze Medal Game
November 11 – Charlottetown
2 Czech Republic	3
5 Sweden	6

=== Quarterfinals ===
November 9, 2023; 19:00	Czech Republic	2–0 (0–0, 0–0, 2–0)	Finland	Credit Union Place, Summerside

Game reference
2 min	Penalties	10 min
24	Shots	15

November 9, 2023; 19:00	Canada White	3–2 OT (1–0, 0–2, 1–0); OT: (1–0)	Canada Red	Eastlink Centre, Charlottetown

Game reference
6 min	Penalties	4 min
30	Shots	33

=== Semifinals ===
November 10, 2023; 19:00	Canada White	6–1 (2–0, 4–1, 0–0)	Sweden	Credit Union Place, Summerside

Game reference
4 min	Penalties	8 min
35	Shots	38

November 10, 2023; 19:00	Czech Republic	4–5 OT (1–2, 2–0, 1–2); OT: (0–1)	United States	Eastlink Centre, Charlottetown

Game reference
4 min	Penalties	6 min
25	Shots	37

=== Fifth place game ===
November 10, 2023; 13:00	Finland	4–5 OT (2–2, 0–1, 2–1); OT: (0–1)	Canada Red	Eastlink Centre, Charlottetown

Game reference
4 min	Penalties	10 min
35	Shots	36

=== Bronze-medal game ===
November 11, 2023; 12:00	Czech Republic	3–6 (1–0, 0–3, 2–3)	Sweden	Eastlink Centre, Charlottetown

Game reference
4 min	Penalties	6 min
23	Shots	30

=== Gold-medal game ===
November 10, 2023; 19:00	Canada White	2–1 OT (1–0, 0–0, 0–1); OT: (1–0)	United States	Eastlink Centre, Charlottetown

Game reference
8 min	Penalties	4 min
27	Shots	35

== Statistics ==
=== Scoring leaders ===
Pos	Player	Country	GP	G	A	Pts	PIM
1	Will Moore	United States	7	5	7	12	2
2	Émile Guité	Canada White	8	7	3	10	10
3	Ivar Stenberg	Sweden	7	7	3	10	2
4	Charlie Tretheway	United States	7	4	6	10	2
5	Matej Pekar	Czech Republic	8	3	7	10	4
6	Gavin McKenna	Canada Red	7	5	3	8	0
7	Cole Reschny	Canada Red	7	3	5	8	4
8	Tomas Poletin	Czech Republic	8	3	5	8	4
9	Adam Benak	Czech Republic	8	3	5	8	0
10	Filip Ekberg	Sweden	7	2	6	8	2

GP = Games played; G = Goals; A = Assists; Pts = Points; PIM = Penalties In Minutes
Source: Hockey Canada

=== Goaltending leaders ===
(minimum 40% team's total ice time)

Pos	Player	Country	TOI	GA	GAA	SA	Sv%	SO
1	Jack Ivankovic	Canada White	430:00	18	2.51	234	.923	0
2	Patrik Kerkola	Finland	245:00	13	3.18	135	.904	0
3	Harrison Boettiger	United States	246:00	12	2.93	119	.899	0
4	Jooa Sammalniemi	Finland	183:00	11	3.61	107	.897	0
5	Ondrej Stebetak	Czech Republic	422:00	21	2.99	195	.892	2

TOI = Time on ice (minutes:seconds); GA = Goals against; GAA = Goals against average; SA = Shots against; Sv% = Save percentage; SO = Shutouts
Source: Hockey Canada

=== Final standings ===
Pos	Team	Pld	W	OTW	OTL	L	GF	GA	GD	Pts	Final Result
1	Canada White (H)	8	1	4	1	2	28	23	+5	12	Champions
2	United States	7	3	1	3	0	35	21	+14	14	Runners-up
3	Sweden	7	4	0	1	2	28	28	0	13	Third place
4	Czech Republic	8	2	1	1	4	24	32	−8	9	Fourth place
5	Canada Red (H)	7	1	3	1	2	23	27	−4	10	Fifth place game
6	Finland	7	2	0	2	3	19	26	−7	8	Fifth place game

Source: Hockey Canada
(H) Host
