= Chinakhov =

Chinakhov is a surname. Notable people with the surname include:

- Egor Chinakhov (born 2001), Russian ice hockey player
- Ruslan Chinakhov (born 1992), Russian nine-ball pool player
