= 2025 NHL entry draft =

2025 North American ice hockey draft

General information
- Date: June 27–28, 2025
- Location: Peacock Theater; Los Angeles, California, U.S.
- Networks: Sportsnet, TVA Sports (Canada); ESPN, ESPN+, NHL Network (United States)

Overview
- 224 total selections in 7 rounds
- First selection: (Canada) Matthew Schaefer (New York Islanders)

The 2025 NHL entry draft was the 63rd draft for the National Hockey League. The draft was held on June 27–28, 2025, and it took place at the Peacock Theater in Los Angeles. The first three selections were Matthew Schaefer by the New York Islanders, Michael Misa by the San Jose Sharks, and Anton Frondell by the Chicago Blackhawks.

== Eligibility ==
Ice hockey players born between January 1, 2005, and September 15, 2007, were eligible for selection in the 2025 NHL entry draft. Additionally, undrafted non-North American players born in 2004 (who had not previously played a complete draft season in North America) were eligible for the draft; and those players who were drafted in the 2023 NHL entry draft, but not signed by an NHL team and who were born after June 30, 2005, were also eligible to re-enter the draft.

== Draft lottery ==
External videos
- Islanders Win NHL Draft Lottery for Pick 1, NHL's official YouTube channel. May 5, 2025.
- Sharks Receive No. 2 Overall Pick In 2025 NHL Draft After Live Draw, Sportsnet's official YouTube channel. May 5, 2025.

Since the 2012–13 NHL season all teams not qualifying for the Stanley Cup playoffs have a "weighted" chance at winning the first overall selection. Beginning with the 2014–15 NHL season the NHL changed the weighting system that was used in previous years. Under the new system the odds of winning the draft lottery for the four lowest finishing teams in the league decreased, while the odds for the other non-playoff teams increased. As the league reduced the number of lottery drawings before the 2021–22 season, this resulted in two lotteries being held instead of three and since the 2022 draft lottery, the teams winning one of the two drawings are allowed to move up a maximum of ten spots in the draft order and a team is only allowed to win the lottery by moving up the order twice in a five-year period.

The New York Islanders and Utah Mammoth won the two lotteries that were held on May 5, 2025, giving them the first and fourth picks overall. The Islanders moved up nine spots to receive the first pick, while Utah moved up the maximum of ten spots to secure the fourth pick. San Jose, Chicago, the New York Rangers, Detroit and Columbus each dropped one spot, while Nashville, Philadelphia, Boston, Seattle, Buffalo, Anaheim and Pittsburgh each dropped two spots. This was the first time that the league broadcast the results of the lottery live.

Indicates team won first lottery
Indicates team won second lottery
Indicates teams that did not win a lottery

Complete draft position odds
Team	1st	2nd	3rd	4th	5th	6th	7th	8th	9th	10th	11th	12th	13th	14th	15th	16th
San Jose	25.5%	18.8%	55.7%													
Chicago	13.5%	14.1%	30.7%	41.7%												
Nashville	11.5%	11.2%	7.8%	39.7%	29.8%											
Philadelphia	9.5%	9.5%	0.3%	15.4%	44.6%	20.8%										
Boston	8.5%	8.6%	0.3%		24.5%	44.0%	14.2%									
Seattle	7.5%	7.7%	0.2%			34.1%	41.4%	9.1%								
Buffalo	6.5%	6.7%	0.2%				44.4%	36.5%	5.6%							
Anaheim	6.0%	6.2%	0.2%					54.4%	30.0%	3.2%						
Pittsburgh	5.0%	5.2%	0.2%						64.4%	23.5%	1.7%					
NY Islanders	3.5%	3.7%	0.1%							73.3%	18.4%	0.9%				
NY Rangers	3.0%	3.2%	0.1%								79.9%	13.4%	0.5%			
Detroit		5.3%										85.7%	8.9%	0.2%		
Columbus			4.3%										90.7%	5.1%	>0.0%	
Utah				3.1%										94.7%	2.1%	>0.0%
Vancouver					1.1%										97.9%	1.1%
Calgary						1.0%										98.9%

== Top prospects ==
Source: NHL Central Scouting (April 15, 2025) ranking.

Ranking	North American skaters	European skaters
1	(Canada) Matthew Schaefer (D)	(Sweden) Anton Frondell (C)
2	(Canada) Michael Misa (C)	(Sweden) Victor Eklund (RW)
3	(United States) James Hagens (C)	(Sweden) Milton Gastrin (C)
4	(Canada) Jake O'Brien (C)	(Czech Republic) Vojtech Cihar (LW)
5	(Czech Republic) Radim Mrtka (D)	(Russia) Alexander Zharovsky (RW)
6	(Canada) Porter Martone (RW)	(Sweden) Eddie Genborg (RW)
7	(Canada) Caleb Desnoyers (C)	(Sweden) Eric Nilson (C)
8	(Canada) Roger McQueen (C)	(Sweden) Jakob Ihs-Wozniak (C)
9	(Canada) Kashawn Aitcheson (D)	(Russia) Kurban Limatov (D)
10	(Canada) Carter Bear (LW)	(Sweden) Theodor Hallquisth (D)

Ranking	North American goalies	European goalies
1	(Canada) Joshua Ravensbergen	(Russia) Pyotr Andreyanov
2	(Canada) Lucas Beckman	(Russia) Semyon Frolov
3	(Slovakia) Michal Pradel	(Switzerland) Elijah Neuenschwander

== Selections by round ==
The order of the 2025 entry draft is listed below.

=== Round one ===
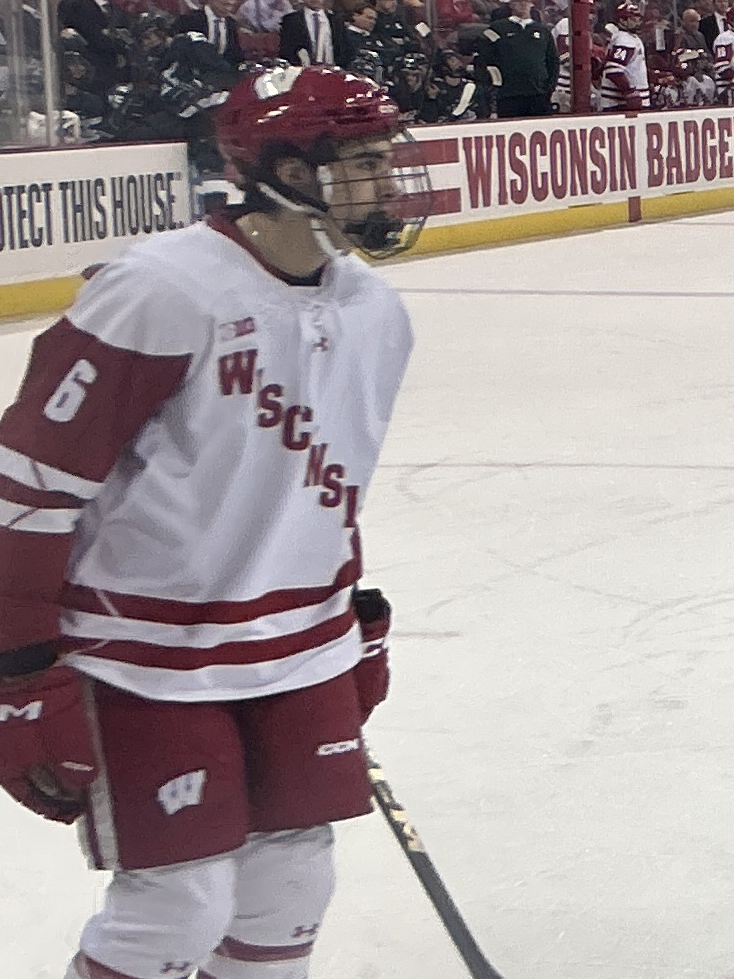
Logan Hensler was selected 23rd overall by the Ottawa Senators.

Will Horcoff was selected 24th overall by the Pittsburgh Penguins.

= NHL All-Star team ·	= NHL All-Star (Note: Players are identified as an All-Star if they were selected for the All-Star game at any time in their career.) ·	= NHL All-Star and NHL All-Star team ·

#	Player	Nationality	NHL team	College/junior/club team
1	Matthew Schaefer (D)	Canada	New York Islanders	Erie Otters (OHL)
2	Michael Misa (C)	Canada	San Jose Sharks	Saginaw Spirit (OHL)
3	Anton Frondell (C)	Sweden	Chicago Blackhawks	Djurgardens IF (HockeyAllsvenskan)
4	Caleb Desnoyers (C)	Canada	Utah Mammoth	Moncton Wildcats (QMJHL)
5	Brady Martin (C)	Canada	Nashville Predators	Sault Ste. Marie Greyhounds (OHL)
6	Porter Martone (RW)	Canada	Philadelphia Flyers	Brampton Steelheads (OHL)
7	James Hagens (C)	United States	Boston Bruins	Boston College Eagles (Hockey East)
8	Jake O'Brien (C)	Canada	Seattle Kraken	Brantford Bulldogs (OHL)
9	Radim Mrtka (D)	Czech Republic	Buffalo Sabres	Seattle Thunderbirds (WHL)
10	Roger McQueen (C)	Canada	Anaheim Ducks	Brandon Wheat Kings (WHL)
11	Ben Kindel (C)	Canada	Pittsburgh Penguins	Calgary Hitmen (WHL)
12	Jack Nesbitt (C)	Canada	Philadelphia Flyers (from NY Rangers via Vancouver and Pittsburgh)^{1}	Windsor Spitfires (OHL)
13	Carter Bear (LW)	Canada	Detroit Red Wings	Everett Silvertips (WHL)
14	Jackson Smith (D)	Canada	Columbus Blue Jackets	Tri-City Americans (WHL)
15	Braeden Cootes (C)	Canada	Vancouver Canucks	Seattle Thunderbirds (WHL)
16	Victor Eklund (RW)	Sweden	New York Islanders (from Calgary via Montreal)^{2}	Djurgardens IF (HockeyAllsvenskan)
17	Kashawn Aitcheson (D)	Canada	New York Islanders (from Montreal)^{3}	Barrie Colts (OHL)
18	Cole Reschny (C)	Canada	Calgary Flames (from New Jersey)^{4}	Victoria Royals (WHL)
19	Justin Carbonneau (RW)	Canada	St. Louis Blues	Blainville-Boisbriand Armada (QMJHL)
20	Pyotr Andreyanov (G)	Russia	Columbus Blue Jackets (from Minnesota)^{5}	Krasnaya Armiya (MHL)
21	Cameron Reid (D)	Canada	Nashville Predators (from Ottawa)^{6}	Kitchener Rangers (OHL)
22	Bill Zonnon (RW)	Canada	Pittsburgh Penguins (from Colorado via Philadelphia)^{7}	Rouyn-Noranda Huskies (QMJHL)
23	Logan Hensler (D)	United States	Ottawa Senators (from Tampa Bay via Nashville)^{8}	Wisconsin Badgers (B1G)
24	Will Horcoff (C)	United States	Pittsburgh Penguins (from Los Angeles)^{9}	Michigan Wolverines (B1G)
25	Vaclav Nestrasil (RW)	Czech Republic	Chicago Blackhawks (from Toronto)^{10}	Muskegon Lumberjacks (USHL)
26	Ryker Lee (RW)	United States	Nashville Predators (from Vegas via San Jose)^{11}	Madison Capitols (USHL)
27	Lynden Lakovic (RW)	Canada	Washington Capitals	Moose Jaw Warriors (WHL)
28	Sascha Boumedienne (D)	Sweden	Winnipeg Jets	Boston University Terriers (Hockey East)
29	Mason West (C)	United States	Chicago Blackhawks (from Carolina)^{12}	Edina Hornets (USHS-MN)
30	Joshua Ravensbergen (G)	Canada	San Jose Sharks (from Dallas)^{13}	Prince George Cougars (WHL)
31	Henry Brzustewicz (D)	United States	Los Angeles Kings (from Edmonton via Philadelphia and Pittsburgh)^{14}	London Knights (OHL)
32	Cullen Potter (C)	United States	Calgary Flames (from Florida)^{15}	Arizona State Sun Devils (NCHC)

Notes

1. The New York Rangers' first-round pick went to the Philadelphia Flyers as the result of a trade on June 27, 2025, that sent Colorado and Edmonton's first-round picks both in 2025 (22nd and 31st overall) to Pittsburgh in exchange for this pick.
  Pittsburgh previously acquired this pick as the result of a trade on January 31, 2025, that sent Drew O'Connor and Marcus Pettersson to Vancouver in exchange for Vincent Desharnais, Melvin Fernstrom, Danton Heinen and this pick. The condition – Pittsburgh will receive a first-round pick in 2025 if the Rangers' first-round pick in 2025 is inside of the top thirteen selections, at the Rangers' choice. – was converted when the Rangers elected to send their first-round pick in 2025 to Pittsburgh on June 24, 2025.
  Vancouver previously acquired this pick as the result of a trade on January 31, 2025, that sent J.T. Miller, Erik Brannstrom and Jackson Dorrington to New York in exchange for Filip Chytil, Victor Mancini and this conditional pick.
2. The Calgary Flames' first-round pick went to the New York Islanders as the result of a trade on June 27, 2025, that sent Noah Dobson to Montreal in exchange for Emil Heineman, a first-round pick in 2025 (17th overall) and this pick.
  Montreal previously acquired this pick as the result of a trade on August 18, 2022, that sent future considerations to Calgary in exchange for Sean Monahan and this pick (being conditional at the time of the trade). The condition – Montreal will receive a first-round pick in 2025 if Calgary's first-round pick in 2024 is inside of the top nineteen selections, Calgary acquires Florida's first-round pick in 2025 and both selections are outside of the top ten, then Montreal will receive the higher of Calgary's or Florida's first-round picks in 2025 – was converted when the Flames did not win either draw in the 2025 NHL entry draft lottery draw on May 5, 2025.
3. The Montreal Canadiens' first-round pick went to the New York Islanders as the result of a trade on June 27, 2025, that sent Noah Dobson to Montreal in exchange for Emil Heineman, Calgary's first-round pick in 2025 (16th overall) and this pick.
4. The New Jersey Devils' first-round pick went to the Calgary Flames as the result of a trade on June 19, 2024, that sent Jacob Markstrom to New Jersey in exchange for Kevin Bahl and this pick (being conditional at the time of the trade). The condition – Calgary will receive a first-round pick in 2025 if New Jersey's first-round pick in 2025 is outside of the top ten selections – was converted when the Devils qualified for the 2025 Stanley Cup playoffs on April 9, 2025.
5. The Minnesota Wild's first-round pick went to the Columbus Blue Jackets as the result of a trade on November 30, 2024, that sent David Jiricek and a fifth-round pick in 2025 to Minnesota in exchange for Daemon Hunt a third and fourth-round pick in 2026, a second-round pick in 2027 and this pick (being conditional at the time of the trade). The condition – Columbus will receive a first-round pick in 2025 if Minnesota's first-round pick in 2025 is outside of the top five selections – was converted when the Wild qualified for the 2025 Stanley Cup playoffs on April 15, 2025.
6. The Ottawa Senators' first-round pick went to the Nashville Predators as the result of a trade on June 27, 2025, that sent Tampa Bay's first-round pick and a third-round pick both in 2025 (23rd and 67th overall) to Ottawa in exchange for this pick.
7. The Colorado Avalanche's first-round pick went to the Pittsburgh Penguins as the result of a trade on June 27, 2025, that sent the Rangers' first-round pick in 2025 (12th overall) to Philadelphia in exchange for Edmonton's first-round pick in 2025 (31st overall) and this pick.
  Philadelphia previously acquired this pick as the result of a trade on March 6, 2024, that sent Sean Walker and a fifth-round pick in 2026 to Colorado in exchange for Ryan Johansen and this pick (being conditional at the time of the trade). The condition – Philadelphia will receive a first-round pick in 2025 if Colorado's first-round pick in 2025 is outside of the top ten selections – was converted when the Avalanche qualified for the 2025 Stanley Cup playoffs on April 3, 2025.
8. The Tampa Bay Lightning's first-round pick went to the Ottawa Senators as the result of a trade on June 27, 2025, that sent a first-round pick in 2025 (21st overall) to Nashville in exchange for a third-round pick in 2025 (67th overall) and this pick.
  Nashville previously acquired this pick as the result of a trade on February 26, 2023, that sent Tanner Jeannot to Tampa Bay in exchange for Cal Foote, a second-round pick in 2024, a third, fourth and fifth-round pick all in 2023 and this pick (being conditional at the time of the trade). The condition – Nashville will receive a first-round pick in 2025 if Tampa Bay's first-round pick in 2025 is outside of the top ten selections – was converted when the Lightning qualified for the 2025 Stanley Cup playoffs on April 5, 2025.
9. The Los Angeles Kings' first-round pick went to the Pittsburgh Penguins as the result of a trade on June 27, 2025, that sent Edmonton's first-round pick and Washington's second-round pick both in 2025 (31st and 59th overall) to Los Angeles in exchange for this pick.
10. The Toronto Maple Leafs' first-round pick went to the Chicago Blackhawks as the result of a trade on February 27, 2023, that sent Sam Lafferty, Jake McCabe, a conditional fifth-round pick in 2024 and 2025 to Toronto in exchange for Joey Anderson, Pavel Gogolev, a second-round pick in 2026 and this pick (being conditional at the time of the trade). The condition – Chicago will receive a first-round pick in 2025 if Toronto's first-round pick in 2025 is outside of the top ten selections – was converted when the Maple Leafs qualified for the 2025 Stanley Cup playoffs on April 2, 2025.
11. The Vegas Golden Knights' first-round pick went to the Nashville Predators as the result of a trade on August 23, 2024, that sent Yaroslav Askarov, Nolan Burke and a third-round pick in 2025 to San Jose in exchange for Magnus Chrona, David Edstrom and this pick (being conditional at the time of the trade). The condition – Nashville will receive a first-round pick in 2025 if the Golden Knights' first-round in 2025 is outside of the top ten selections – was converted when Vegas qualified for the 2025 Stanley Cup playoffs on April 1, 2025.
  San Jose previously acquired this pick in a trade on March 8, 2024, that sent Tomas Hertl and third-round picks in 2025 and 2027 to Vegas in exchange for David Edstrom and this pick.
12. The Carolina Hurricanes' first-round pick went to the Chicago Blackhawks as the result of a trade on June 27, 2025, that sent a second-round pick 2025 (34th overall), Dallas's second-round pick in 2025 (62nd overall) and a fifth-round pick in 2027 to Carolina in exchange for this pick.
13. The Dallas Stars' first-round pick went to the San Jose Sharks as the result of a trade on February 1, 2025, that sent Cody Ceci and Mikael Granlund to Dallas in exchange for a conditional third-round pick in 2025 and this pick.
14. The Edmonton Oilers' first-round pick went to the Los Angeles Kings as the result of a trade on June 27, 2025, that sent a first-round pick in 2025 (24th overall) to Pittsburgh in exchange for Washington's second-round pick in 2025 (59th overall) and this pick.
  Pittsburgh previously acquired this pick as the result of a trade on June 27, 2025, that sent the Rangers' first-round pick in 2025 (12th overall) to Philadelphia in exchange for Colorado's first-round pick in 2025 (22nd overall) and this pick.
  Philadelphia previously acquired this pick as the result of a trade on June 28, 2024 that sent Florida's first-round pick in 2024 to Edmonton in exchange for this pick (being conditional at the time of the trade). The condition – Philadelphia will receive a first-round in 2025 if Edmonton's first-round pick in 2025 is outside of the top twelve selections – was converted when the Oilers qualified for the 2025 Stanley Cup playoffs on April 11, 2025.
15. The Florida Panthers' first-round pick went to the Calgary Flames as the result of a trade on July 22, 2022, that sent Matthew Tkachuk and a conditional fourth-round pick in 2025 to Florida in exchange for Jonathan Huberdeau, Cole Schwindt, MacKenzie Weegar and this pick (being conditional at the time of the trade). The condition – Calgary will receive a first-round pick in 2025 if Florida's first-round pick in 2025 is outside of the top ten selections – was converted when the Panthers qualified for the 2025 Stanley Cup playoffs on April 5, 2025.

=== Round two ===
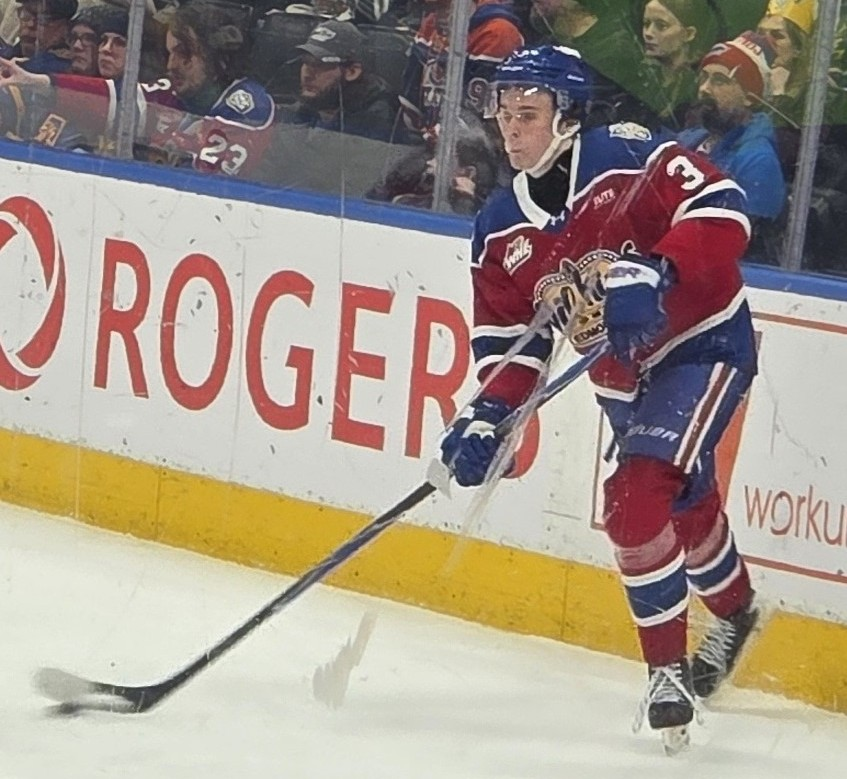
Blake Fiddler was selected 36th overall by the Seattle Kraken.

#	Player	Nationality	NHL team	College/junior/club team
33	Haoxi Wang (D)	China	San Jose Sharks	Oshawa Generals (OHL)
34	Alexander Zharovsky (RW)	Russia	Montreal Canadiens (from Chicago via Carolina)^{1}	Tolpar Ufa (MHL)
35	Jacob Rombach (D)	United States	Nashville Predators	Lincoln Stars (USHL)
36	Blake Fiddler (D)	United States	Seattle Kraken (from Philadelphia)^{2}	Edmonton Oil Kings (WHL)
37	Milton Gastrin (C)	Sweden	Washington Capitals (from Boston)^{3}	Modo Hockey (SHL)
38	Carter Amico (D)	United States	Philadelphia Flyers (from Seattle)^{4}	U.S. NTDP (USHL)
39	Peyton Kettles (D)	Canada	Pittsburgh Penguins (from Buffalo)^{5}	Swift Current Broncos (WHL)
40	Jack Murtagh (LW)	United States	Philadelphia Flyers (from Anaheim)^{6}	U.S. NTDP (USHL)
41	Semyon Frolov (G)	Russia	Carolina Hurricanes (from Pittsburgh via Montreal)^{7}	JHC Spartak (MHL)
42	Daniil Prokhorov (RW)	Russia	New York Islanders	HC Dinamo Saint Petersburg (MHL)
43	Malcolm Spence (LW)	Canada	New York Rangers (from NY Rangers via Utah and Colorado)^{8}	Erie Otters (OHL)
44	Eddie Genborg (RW)	Sweden	Detroit Red Wings	Linkoping HC (SHL)
45	Eric Nilson (C)	Sweden	Anaheim Ducks (from Columbus via Philadelphia)^{9}	Djurgardens IF J20 (J20 Nationell)
46	Max Psenicka (D)	Czech Republic	Utah Mammoth	Portland Winterhawks (WHL)
47	Alexei Medvedev (G)	Russia	Vancouver Canucks	London Knights (OHL)
48	Shane Vansaghi (RW)	United States	Philadelphia Flyers (from Calgary)^{10}	Michigan State Spartans (B1G)
49	Charlie Cerrato (C)	United States	Carolina Hurricanes (from Montreal)^{11}	Penn State Nittany Lions (B1G)
50	Conrad Fondrk (C)	United States	New Jersey Devils	U.S. NTDP (USHL)
51	William Moore (C)	United States	Boston Bruins (from St. Louis via Pittsburgh, St. Louis and Edmonton)^{12}	U.S. NTDP (USHL)
52	Theodor Hallquisth (D)	Sweden	Minnesota Wild	Orebro HK J20 (J20 Nationell)
53	Cole McKinney (C)	United States	San Jose Sharks (from Ottawa)^{13}	U.S. NTDP (USHL)
54	Theo Stockselius (C)	Sweden	Calgary Flames (from Colorado via Washington)^{14}	Djurgardens IF J20 (J20 Nationell)
55	Jakob Ihs-Wozniak (C)	Sweden	Vegas Golden Knights (from Tampa Bay and Nashville)^{15}	Lulea HF J20 (J20 Nationell)
56	Ethan Czata (C)	Canada	Tampa Bay Lightning (from Los Angeles)^{16}	Niagara IceDogs (OHL)
57	Matthew Gard (C)	Canada	Philadelphia Flyers (from Toronto via Utah, Tampa Bay and Seattle)^{17}	Red Deer Rebels (WHL)
58	Jack Ivankovic (G)	Canada	Nashville Predators (from Vegas)^{18}	Brampton Steelheads (OHL)
59	Vojtech Cihar (LW)	Czech Republic	Los Angeles Kings (from Washington via Pittsburgh)^{19}	HC Energie Karlovy Vary (Czech Extraliga)
60	Lasse Boelius (D)	Finland	Anaheim Ducks (from Winnipeg via New Jersey)^{20}	HC Assat Pori (Liiga)
61	Liam Pettersson (D)	Sweden	Boston Bruins (from Carolina via Colorado)^{21}	Vaxjo Lakers HC J20 (J20 Nationell)
62	Ivan Ryabkin (C)	Russia	Carolina Hurricanes (from Dallas via Chicago)^{22}	Muskegon Lumberjacks (USHL)
63	Ben Kevan (RW)	United States	New Jersey Devils (from Edmonton via Utah)^{23}	Des Moines Buccaneers (USHL)
64	Tinus Luc Koblar (C)	Norway	Toronto Maple Leafs (from Florida)^{24}	Leksands IF J20 (J20 Nationell)

Notes

1. The Chicago Blackhawks' second-round pick went to the Montreal Canadiens as the result of a trade on June 28, 2025, that sent Pittsburgh's second-round pick in 2025 (41st overall), a second-round pick in 2025 (49th overall) to Carolina in exchange for a sixth-round pick in 2025 (189th overall) and this pick.
  Carolina previously acquired this pick as the result of a trade on June 27, 2025, that sent a first-round pick in 2025 (29th overall) to Chicago in exchange for Dallas's second-round pick in 2025 (62nd overall), a fifth-round pick in 2027 and this pick.
2. The Philadelphia Flyers' second-round pick went to the Seattle Kraken as the result of a trade on June 28, 2025, that sent a second-round pick in 2025 (38th overall) and Toronto's second-round pick in 2025 (57th overall) to Philadelphia in exchange for a third-round pick in 2025 (68th overall) and this pick.
3. The Boston Bruins' second-round pick went to the Washington Capitals as the result of a trade on February 23, 2023, that sent Garnet Hathaway and Dmitry Orlov to Boston in exchange for Craig Smith, a first-round pick in 2023, a third-round pick in 2024 and this pick.
4. The Seattle Kraken's second-round pick went to the Philadelphia Flyers as the result of a trade on June 28, 2025, that sent a second and third-round pick both in 2025 (36th and 68th overall) to Seattle in exchange for Toronto's second-round pick in 2025 (57th overall) and this pick.
5. The Buffalo Sabres' second-round pick went to the Pittsburgh Penguins as the result of a trade on June 28, 2025, that sent Conor Timmins and Isaac Belliveau to Buffalo in exchange for Connor Clifton and this pick.
6. The Anaheim Ducks' second-round pick went to the Philadelphia Flyers as the result of a trade on January 8, 2024 that sent Cutter Gauthier to Anaheim in exchange for Jamie Drysdale and this pick.
7. The Pittsburgh Penguins' second-round pick went to the Carolina Hurricanes as the result of a trade on June 28, 2025, that sent Chicago's second-round pick in 2025 (34th overall) and a sixth-round pick in 2025 (189th overall) to Montreal in exchange for a second-round pick in 2025 (49th overall) and this pick.
  Montreal previously acquired this pick as the result of a trade on August 6, 2023, that sent Mike Hoffman and Rem Pitlick to Pittsburgh in exchange for Casey DeSmith, Nathan Legare, Jeff Petry and this pick.
8. The New York Rangers re-acquired their second-round pick as the result of a trade on March 1, 2024, that sent Hank Kempf, Ryan Lindgren and Jimmy Vesey to Colorado in exchange for Calvin de Haan, Juuso Parssinen, a conditional fourth-round pick in 2025 and this pick (being conditional at the time of the trade). The condition – New York will receive the earlier of Carolina‘s or their own second-round pick in 2025 – was converted when the Rangers failed to qualify for the 2025 Stanley Cup playoffs on April 12, 2025.
  Colorado previously acquired this pick as the result of a trade on June 28, 2024, that sent a first-round pick in 2024 to Utah in exchange for a second and third-round pick both in 2024 and this pick.
  Utah previously acquired this pick as the result of a trade on July 13, 2022, that sent Ty Emberson to New York in exchange for Patrik Nemeth, a conditional second-round pick in 2026 and this pick.
9. The Columbus Blue Jackets' second-round pick went to the Anaheim Ducks as the result of a trade on June 23, 2025, that sent Trevor Zegras to Philadelphia in exchange for Ryan Poehling, a fourth-round pick in 2026 and this pick.
  Philadelphia previously acquired this pick as the result of a trade on June 6, 2023, that sent Kevin Connauton to Columbus in exchange for Los Angeles' first-round pick in 2023 and this pick (being conditional at the time of the trade). The condition – Philadelphia will receive a second-round pick in 2024 or 2025, at the Blue Jackets' choice – was converted on June 29, 2024, when Columbus elected to keep their second-round pick in 2024.
10. The Calgary Flames' second-round pick went to the Philadelphia Flyers as the result of a trade on January 30, 2025, that sent Joel Farabee and Morgan Frost to Calgary in exchange for Andrei Kuzmenko, Jakob Pelletier, a seventh-round pick in 2028 and this pick.
11. The Montreal Canadiens' second-round pick went to the Carolina Hurricanes as the result of a trade on June 28, 2025, that sent Chicago's second-round pick in 2025 (34th overall) and a sixth-round pick in 2025 (189th overall) to Montreal in exchange for Pittsburgh's second-round pick in 2025 (41st overall) and this pick.
12. The St. Louis Blues' second-round pick went to the Boston Bruins as the result of a trade on March 4, 2025, that sent Petr Hauser and Max Jones to Edmonton in exchange for Max Wanner, a fourth-round pick in 2026 and this pick in a three-team deal in which Edmonton acquired Trent Frederic.
  Edmonton previously acquired this pick as compensation for not matching an offer sheet from St. Louis to restricted free agent Philip Broberg on August 20, 2024.
  St. Louis previously re-acquired this pick as the result of a trade on August 13, 2024, that sent Ottawa's third-round pick in 2025 and a second-round pick in 2026 to Pittsburgh in exchange for a fifth-round pick in 2026 and this pick.
  Pittsburgh previously acquired this pick as the result of a trade on June 29, 2024, that sent future considerations to St. Louis in exchange for Kevin Hayes and this pick.
13. The Ottawa Senators' second-round pick went to the San Jose Sharks as the result of a trade on March 7, 2025, that sent Tristen Robins, Fabian Zetterlund and a fourth-round pick in 2025 to Ottawa in exchange for Noah Gregor, Zack Ostapchuk and this pick.
14. The Colorado Avalanche's second-round pick went to the Calgary Flames as the result of a trade on June 27, 2024, that sent Andrew Mangiapane to Washington in exchange for this pick.
  Washington previously acquired this pick as the result of a trade on February 23, 2023, that sent Lars Eller to Colorado in exchange for this pick.
15. The Tampa Bay Lightning's second-round pick went to the Vegas Golden Knights as the result of a trade on June 28, 2025, that sent a second and fifth-round pick both in 2025 (58th and 122nd overall) to Nashville in exchange for this pick.
  Nashville previously acquired this pick as the result of a trade on May 21, 2024, that sent Ryan McDonagh and Edmonton's fourth-round pick in 2024 to Tampa Bay in exchange for a seventh-round pick in 2024 and this pick.
16. The Los Angeles Kings' second-round pick went to the Tampa Bay Lightning as the result of a trade on June 29, 2024, that sent Tanner Jeannot to Los Angeles in exchange for a fourth-round pick in 2024 and this pick.
17. The Toronto Maple Leafs' second-round pick went to the Philadelphia Flyers as the result of a trade on June 28, 2025, that sent a second and third-round pick both in 2025 (36th and 68th overall) to Seattle in exchange for a second-round pick in 2025 (38th overall) and this pick.
  Seattle previously acquired this pick as the result of a trade on March 5, 2025, that sent Kyle Aucoin, Oliver Bjorkstrand and a fifth-round pick in 2026 to Tampa Bay in exchange for Mikey Eyssimont, conditional first-round picks in 2026 and 2027 and this pick.
  Tampa Bay previously acquired this pick as the result of a trade on June 29, 2024, that sent Mikhail Sergachev to Utah in exchange for Conor Geekie, J.J. Moser, a seventh-round pick in 2024 and this pick.
  Utah previously acquired this pick as the result of a trade on February 19, 2022, that sent Ryan Dzingel and Ilya Lyubushkin to Toronto in exchange for Nick Ritchie and this pick (being conditional at the time of the trade). The condition – Arizona (Note: As per their April 2024 agreement, all draft rights held by the Arizona Coyotes were transferred to the Utah Mammoth.) will receive a second-round pick in 2025 or a third-round pick in 2023, at Arizona's choice – was converted on February 24, 2023, when Arizona elected not to take Toronto's third-round pick in 2023.
18. The Vegas Golden Knights' second-round pick went to the Nashville Predators as the result of a trade on June 28, 2025, that sent Tampa Bay's second-round pick in 2025 (55th overall) to Vegas in exchange for a fourth-round pick in 2025 (122nd overall) and this pick.
19. The Washington Capitals' second-round pick went to the Los Angeles Kings as the result of a trade on June 27, 2025, that sent a first-round pick in 2025 (24th overall) to Pittsburgh in exchange for a first-round pick in 2025 (31st overall) and this pick.
  Pittsburgh previously acquired this pick as the result of a trade on March 7, 2025, that sent Anthony Beauvillier to Washington in exchange for this pick.
20. The Winnipeg Jets' second-round pick went to the Anaheim Ducks as a result of a trade on March 6, 2025, that sent Brian Dumoulin to New Jersey in exchange for Herman Traff and this pick (being conditional at the time of the trade). The condition – Anaheim will receive the higher of Edmonton or Winnipeg's second-round picks in 2025 – was converted when Winnipeg was eliminated from the 2025 Stanley Cup playoffs on May 17, 2025.
  New Jersey previously acquired this pick as the result of a trade on March 8, 2024, that sent Tyler Toffoli to Winnipeg in exchange for a third-round pick in 2024 and this pick.
21. The Carolina Hurricanes' second-round pick went to the Boston Bruins as the result of a trade on March 7, 2025, that sent Charlie Coyle and a fifth-round pick in 2026 to Colorado in exchange for Casey Mittelstadt, Will Zellers and this pick (being conditional at the time of the trade). The condition – Boston will receive the later of Carolina or the Rangers' second-round picks in 2025 – was converted when the Rangers failed to qualify for the 2025 Stanley Cup playoffs on April 12, 2025.
  Colorado previously acquired this pick as the result of a trade on January 24, 2025, that sent Mikko Rantanen to Carolina in exchange for Jack Drury, Martin Necas, a fourth-round pick in 2026 and this pick.
22. The Dallas Stars' second-round pick went to the Carolina Hurricanes as the result of a trade on June 27, 2025, that sent a first-round pick 2025 (29th overall) to Chicago in exchange for a second-round pick in 2025 (34th overall), a fifth-round pick in 2027 and this pick.
  Chicago previously acquired this pick as the result of a trade on March 2, 2023, that sent Max Domi and Dylan Wells to Dallas in exchange for Anton Khudobin and this pick.
23. The Edmonton Oilers' second-round pick went to the New Jersey Devils as the result of a trade on June 29, 2024, that sent John Marino and Colorado's fifth-round pick in 2024 to Utah in exchange for Washington's second-round pick in 2024 and this pick.
  Utah previously acquired this pick as the result of a trade on July 7, 2022, that sent Colorado's first-round pick in 2022 to Edmonton in exchange for Zack Kassian, a first-round pick in 2022 and a third-round pick in 2024 and this pick.
24. The Florida Panthers' second-round pick went to the Toronto Maple Leafs as the result of a trade on June 29, 2024, that sent Boston's second-round pick in 2024 to Florida in exchange for a seventh-round pick in 2024 and this pick.

=== Round three ===
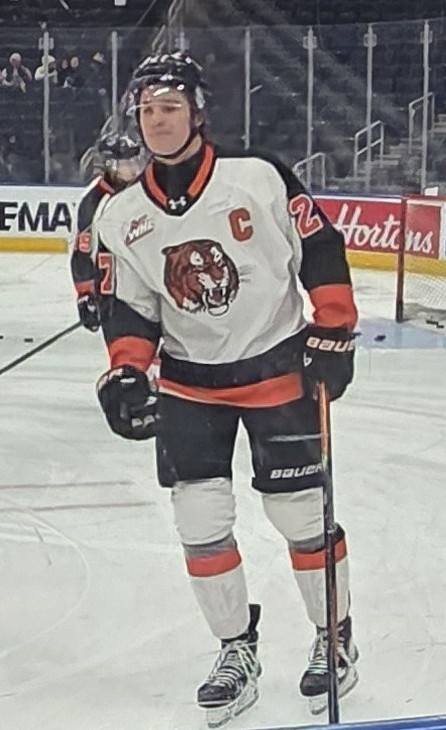
Bryce Pickford was selected 81st overall by the Montreal Canadiens.

#	Player	Nationality	NHL team	College/junior/club team
65	Kieren Dervin (C)	Canada	Vancouver Canucks (from San Jose via Vegas and NY Rangers)^{1}	St. Andrew's Saints (CISAA)
66	Nathan Behm (RW)	Canada	Chicago Blackhawks (from Chicago via Carolina)^{2}	Kamloops Blazers (WHL)
67	Kurban Limatov (D)	Russia	Carolina Hurricanes (from Nashville via Ottawa and Los Angeles)^{3}	MHC Dynamo Moscow (MHL)
68	Will Reynolds (D)	Canada	Seattle Kraken (from Philadelphia)^{4}	Acadie–Bathurst Titan (QMJHL)
69	Hayden Paupanekis (C)	Canada	Montreal Canadiens (from Boston)^{5}	Kelowna Rockets (WHL)
70	Sean Barnhill (D)	United States	New York Rangers (from Seattle)^{6}	Dubuque Fighting Saints (USHL)
71	David Bedkowski (D)	Canada	Buffalo Sabres	Owen Sound Attack (OHL)
72	Noah Read (C)	Canada	Anaheim Ducks	London Knights (OHL)
73	Charlie Trethewey (D)	United States	Pittsburgh Penguins	U.S. NTDP (USHL)
74	Luca Romano (C)	Canada	New York Islanders	Kitchener Rangers (OHL)
75	Michal Pradel (G)	Slovakia	Detroit Red Wings (from NY Rangers via Utah)^{7}	Tri-City Storm (USHL)
76	Malte Vass (D)	Sweden	Columbus Blue Jackets (from Detroit)^{8}	Farjestad BK J20 (J20 Nationell)
77	Francesco Dell'Elce (D)	Canada	Colorado Avalanche (from Columbus)^{9}	UMass Minutemen (Hockey East)
78	Stepan Hoch (LW)	Czech Republic	Utah Mammoth	Motor Ceske Budejovice (Czech Extraliga)
79	Cooper Simpson (LW)	United States	Boston Bruins (from Vancouver via Montreal)^{10}	Tri-City Storm (USHL)
80	Mace'o Phillips (D)	United States	Calgary Flames	U.S. NTDP (USHL)
81	Bryce Pickford (D)	Canada	Montreal Canadiens	Medicine Hat Tigers (WHL)
82	Arseni Radkov (G)	Belarus	Montreal Canadiens (from New Jersey)^{11}	Tyumensky Legion (MHL)
83	Tommy Lafreniere (RW)	Canada	Edmonton Oilers (from St. Louis)^{12}	Kamloops Blazers (WHL)
84	Gabriel D'Aigle (G)	Canada	Pittsburgh Penguins (from Minnesota via Philadelphia and Nashville)^{13}	Victoriaville Tigres (QMJHL)
85	Mateo Nobert (C)	Canada	Vegas Golden Knights (from Ottawa via St. Louis and Pittsburgh)^{14}	Blainville-Boisbriand Armada (QMJHL)
86	Tyler Hopkins (C)	Canada	Toronto Maple Leafs (from Colorado via Nashville and San Jose)^{15}	Kingston Frontenacs (OHL)
87	Roman Bausov (D)	Russia	Carolina Hurricanes (from Tampa Bay)^{16}	HC Dinamo Saint Petersburg U20 (MHL)
88	Kristian Epperson (LW)	United States	Los Angeles Kings	Saginaw Spirit (OHL)
89	Artyom Gonchar (D)	Russia	New York Rangers (from Toronto via Anaheim)^{17}	Magnitogorsk Stalnye Lisy (MHL)
90	Mason Moe (C)	United States	New Jersey Devils (from Vegas)^{18}	Madison Capitols (USHL)
91	Brady Peddle (D)	Canada	Pittsburgh Penguins (from Washington via Vegas)^{19}	Waterloo Black Hawks (USHL)
92	Owen Martin (C)	Canada	Winnipeg Jets	Spokane Chiefs (WHL)
93	Blake Vanek (RW)	United States	Ottawa Senators (from Carolina via Washington)^{20}	Stillwater Ponies (USHS-MN)
94	Cameron Schmidt (RW)	Canada	Dallas Stars	Vancouver Giants (WHL)
95	Teddy Mutryn (C)	United States	San Jose Sharks (from Edmonton)^{21}	Chicago Steel (USHL)
96	Maxim Schafer (LW)	Germany	Washington Capitals (from Florida via Ottawa)^{22}	Eisbaren Berlin (DEL)

Notes

1. The San Jose Sharks' third-round pick went to the Vancouver Canucks as the result of a trade on March 6, 2025, that sent Carson Soucy to New York in exchange for this pick.
  The Rangers previously acquired this pick as the result of a trade on March 6, 2025, that sent Reilly Smith to Vegas in exchange for Brendan Brisson and this pick.
  Vegas previously acquired this pick as the result of a trade on March 8, 2024, that sent David Edstrom and a first-round pick in 2025 to San Jose in exchange for Tomas Hertl, a third-round pick in 2027 and this pick.
2. The Chicago Blackhawks' re-acquired their third-round pick as the result of a trade on January 24, 2025, that sent Taylor Hall and Mikko Rantanen to Carolina in exchange for this pick.
  Carolina previously acquired this pick as the result of a trade on June 29, 2024, that sent a 3rd-round pick in 2024 to Chicago in exchange for this pick.
3. The Nashville Predators' third-round pick went to the Carolina Hurricanes as the result of a trade on June 28, 2025, that sent a fourth-round pick in 2025 (125th overall) and Dallas's third-round pick in 2026 to Los Angeles in exchange for this pick.
  Los Angeles previously acquired this pick as the result of a trade on June 28, 2025, that sent Jordan Spence to Ottawa in exchange for Colorado's sixth-round pick in 2026 and this pick.
  Ottawa previously acquired this pick as the result of a trade on June 27, 2025, that sent a first-round pick in 2025 (21st overall) to Nashville in exchange for Tampa Bay's first-round pick in 2025 (23rd overall) and this pick.
4. The Philadelphia Flyers' third-round pick went to the Seattle Kraken as the result of a trade on June 28, 2025, that sent a second-round pick in 2025 (38th overall) and Toronto's second-round pick in 2025 (57th overall) to Philadelphia in exchange for a second-round pick in 2025 (36th overall) and this pick.
5. The Boston Bruins' third-round pick went to the Montreal Canadiens as a result of a trade on June 28, 2025, that sent Vancouver's third-round pick and Detroit's fourth-round pick both in 2025 (79th and 108th overall) to Boston in exchange for this pick.
6. The Seattle Kraken's third-round pick went to the New York Rangers as a result of a trade on December 18, 2024, that sent Kaapo Kakko to Seattle in exchange for Will Borgen, a sixth-round pick in 2025 and this pick.
7. The New York Rangers' third-round pick went to the Detroit Red Wings as the result of a trade on October 29, 2024, that sent Olli Maatta to Utah in exchange for this pick.
  Utah previously acquired this pick as the result of a trade on February 28, 2023, that sent Patrick Kane to New York in exchange for this pick (being conditional at the time of the trade). The condition – Utah will receive the higher of Dallas or New York's third-round picks in 2025 if the Rangers acquire the Stars' third-round pick in 2025 – was converted when New York traded Dallas's conditional third-round pick in 2025 to Seattle for Alexander Wennberg on March 6, 2024.
8. The Detroit Red Wings' third-round pick went to the Columbus Blue Jackets as the result of a trade on June 28, 2025, that sent a fourth-round pick in 2025 (109th overall) and 2026 to Detroit in exchange for this pick.
9. The Columbus Blue Jackets' third-round pick went to the Colorado Avalanche as the result of a trade on June 27, 2025, that sent Charlie Coyle and Miles Wood to Columbus in exchange for Gavin Brindley, a conditional second-round pick in 2027 and this pick.
10. The Vancouver Canucks' third-round pick went to the Boston Bruins as the result of a trade on June 28, 2025, that sent a third-round pick in 2025 (69th overall) to Montreal in exchange for Detroit's fourth-round pick in 2025 (108th overall) and this pick.
  Montreal previously acquired this pick as the result of a trade on September 19, 2023, that sent Casey DeSmith to Vancouver in exchange for Tanner Pearson and this pick.
11. The New Jersey Devils' third-round pick went to the Montreal Canadiens as the result of a trade on March 8, 2024, that sent Jake Allen to New Jersey in exchange for this pick (being conditional at the time of the trade). The condition – Montreal will receive a third-round pick in 2025 if Allen plays in less than 40 games during the 2024–25 NHL season – was converted when it became impossible for Allen to play in 40 games during the 2024–25 NHL season on March 15, 2025.
12. The St. Louis Blues' third-round pick went to the Edmonton Oilers as compensation for not matching an offer sheet from St. Louis to restricted free agent Dylan Holloway on August 20, 2024.
13. The Minnesota Wild's third-round pick went to the Pittsburgh Penguins as the result of a trade on August 13, 2024, that sent Jordan Frasca to Nashville in exchange for Cody Glass, a sixth-round pick in 2026 and this pick.
  Nashville previously acquired this pick as the result of a trade on June 28, 2024, that sent a second-round pick in 2024 to Philadelphia in exchange for a third-round pick in 2024 and this pick.
  Philadelphia previously acquired this pick as the result of a trade on June 28, 2024, that sent a first-round pick in 2024 to Minnesota in exchange for a first-round pick in 2024 and this pick.
14. The Ottawa Senators' third-round pick went to the Vegas Golden Knights as the result of a trade on June 28, 2025, that sent Washington's third-round pick in 2025 (91st overall) and a fifth-round pick in 2025 (154th overall) to Pittsburgh in exchange for this pick.
  Pittsburgh previously acquired this pick as the result of a trade on August 13, 2024, that sent St. Louis' second-round pick in 2025 and a fifth-round pick in 2026 to St. Louis in exchange for a second-round pick in 2026 and this pick.
  St. Louis previously acquired this pick as the result of a trade on July 2, 2024, that sent future considerations to Ottawa in exchange for Mathieu Joseph and this pick.
15. The Colorado Avalanche's third-round pick went to the Toronto Maple Leafs as the result of a trade on October 30, 2024, that sent Timothy Liljegren to San Jose in exchange for Matt Benning, a sixth-round pick in 2026 and this pick (being conditional at the time of the trade). The condition – Toronto will receive the higher of Colorado or Edmonton's third round picks in 2025 – was converted when the Oilers advanced to the 2025 Western Conference final.
  San Jose previously acquired this pick as a result of the a trade on August 23, 2024, that sent Magnus Chrona, David Edstrom and a conditional first-round pick in 2025 to Nashville in exchange for Yaroslav Askarov, Nolan Burke and this pick.
  Nashville previously acquired this pick as the result of a trade on March 7, 2024, that sent Graham Sward and Yakov Trenin to Colorado in exchange for Jeremy Hanzel and this pick.
16. The Tampa Bay Lightning's third-round pick went to the Carolina Hurricanes as the result of a trade on June 30, 2024, that sent Jake Guentzel to Tampa Bay in exchange for this pick.
17. The Toronto Maple Leafs' third-round pick went to the New York Rangers as the result of a trade on June 12, 2025, that sent Chris Kreider and a fourth-round pick in 2025 to Anaheim in exchange for Carey Terrance and this pick.
  Anaheim previously acquired this pick as the result of a trade on February 29, 2024, that sent Kirill Slepets to Toronto in exchange for this pick.
18. The Vegas Golden Knights' third-round pick went to the New Jersey Devils as the result of a trade on June 29, 2024, that sent Alexander Holtz and Akira Schmid to Vegas in exchange for Paul Cotter and this pick.
19. The Washington Capitals' third-round pick went to the Pittsburgh Penguins as the result of a trade on June 28, 2025, that sent Ottawa's third-round pick in 2025 (85th overall) to Vegas in exchange for a fifth-round pick in 2025 (154th overall) and this pick.
  Vegas previously acquired this pick as the result of a trade on June 29, 2024, that sent Logan Thompson to Washington in exchange for the Islanders' third-round pick in 2024 and this pick.
20. The Carolina Hurricanesꞌ third-round pick went to the Ottawa Senators as the result of a trade on June 28, 2025, that sent Florida's third-round pick in 2025 (96th overall) and a seventh-round pick in 2027 to Washington in exchange for this pick.
  Washington previously acquired this pick as the result of a trade on March 8, 2024, that sent Evgeny Kuznetsov to Carolina in exchange for this pick.
21. The Edmonton Oilers' third-round pick went to the San Jose Sharks as the result of a trade on August 18, 2024, that sent Ty Emberson to Edmonton in exchange for Cody Ceci and this pick.
22. The Florida Panthers' third-round pick went to the Washington Capitals as the result of a trade on June 28, 2025, that sent Carolina's third-round pick in 2025 (93rd overall) to Ottawa in exchange for a seventh-round pick in 2027 and this pick.
  Ottawa previously acquired this pick as the result of a trade on March 6, 2024, that sent Vladimir Tarasenko to Florida in exchange for a conditional fourth-round pick in 2024 and this pick.

=== Round four ===
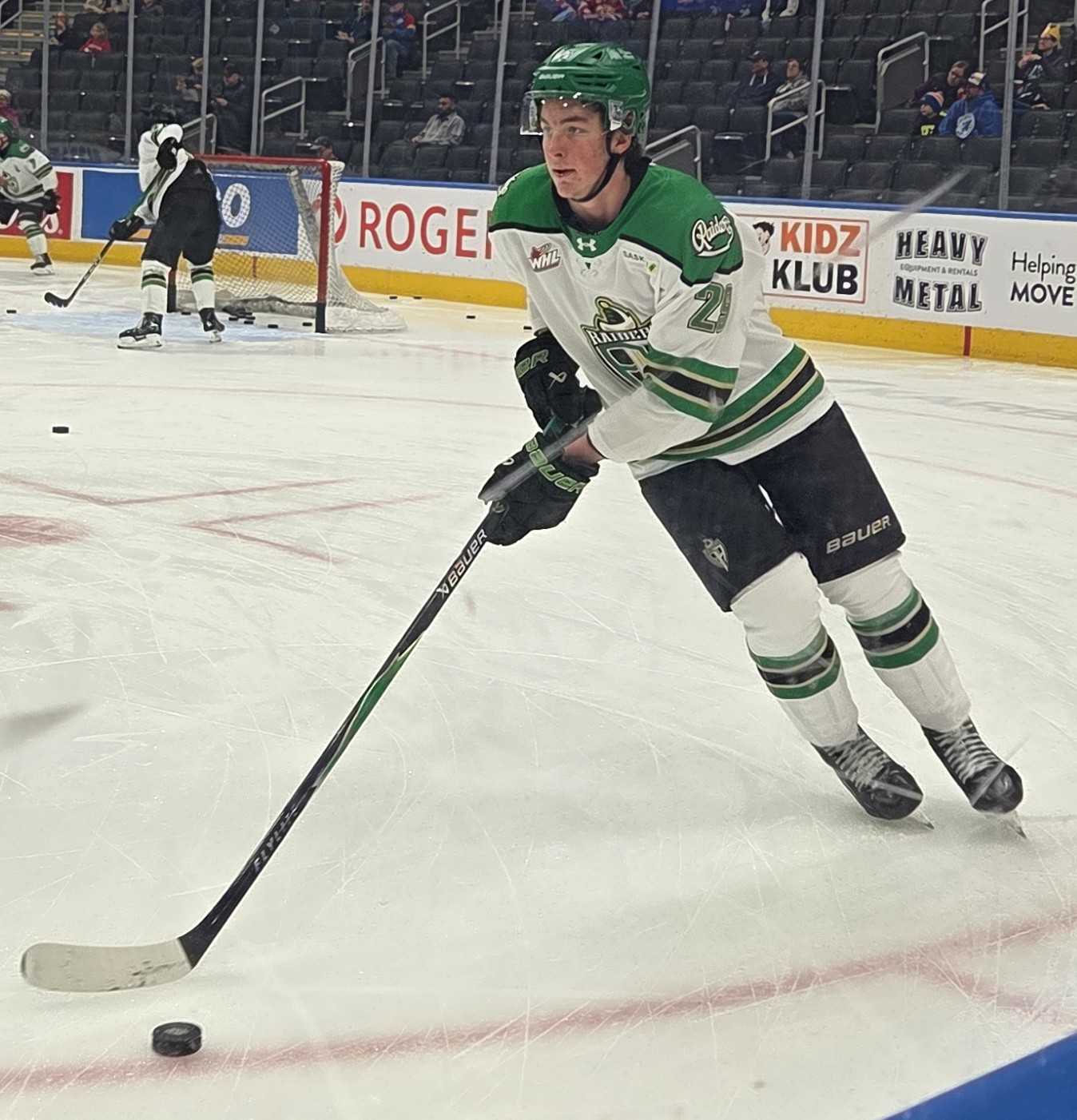
Brandon Gorzynski was selected 126th overall by the Dallas Stars.

#	Player	Nationality	NHL team	College/junior/club team
97	Lucas Beckman (G)	Canada	Ottawa Senators (from San Jose)^{1}	Baie-Comeau Drakkar (QMJHL)
98	Julius Sumpf (C)	Germany	Chicago Blackhawks	Moncton Wildcats (QMJHL)
99	Trenten Bennett (G)	Canada	New Jersey Devils (from Nashville)^{2}	Kemptville 73's (CCHL)
100	Vashek Blanar (D)	Czech Republic	Boston Bruins (from Philadelphia via Toronto)^{3}	IF Troja-Ljungby (J18 Regional)
101	Drew Schock (D)	United States	Anaheim Ducks (from Boston via Detroit)^{4}	U.S. NTDP (USHL)
102	Adam Benak (C)	Czech Republic	Minnesota Wild (from Seattle)^{5}	Youngstown Phantoms (USHL)
103	Matous Kucharcik (C)	Czech Republic	Buffalo Sabres	HC Slavia Praha U20 (Czechia U20)
104	Elijah Neuenschwander (G)	Switzerland	Anaheim Ducks (from Anaheim via New York Rangers)^{6}	HC Fribourg-Gotteron U20 (U20-Elit)
105	Travis Hayes (RW)	United States	Pittsburgh Penguins	Sault Ste. Marie Greyhounds (OHL)
106	Tomas Poletin (LW)	Czech Republic	New York Islanders	Lahti Pelicans (Liiga)
107	Parker Holmes (LW)	Canada	Chicago Blackhawks (from NY Rangers)^{7}	Brantford Bulldogs (OHL)
108	Benjamin Rautiainen (C)	Finland	Tampa Bay Lightning (from Detroit via Montreal and Boston)^{8}	Tappara (Liiga)
109	Brent Solomon (RW)	United States	Detroit Red Wings (from Columbus)^{9}	Sioux Falls Stampede (USHL)
110	Yegor Borikov (RW)	Belarus	Utah Mammoth	Dinamo Minsk (KHL)
111	Mikkel Eriksen (C)	Norway	New York Rangers (from Vancouver via Colorado)^{10}	Farjestad BK J20 (J20 Nationell)
112	Mads Kongsbak Klyvo (LW)	Denmark	Florida Panthers (from Calgary)^{11}	Frolunda HC J20 (J20 Nationell)
113	L.J. Mooney (C)	United States	Montreal Canadiens	U.S. NTDP (USHL)
114	Gustav Hillstrom (C)	Sweden	New Jersey Devils	Brynas IF (SHL)
115	Ilyas Magomedsultanov (D)	Russia	San Jose Sharks (from St. Louis via Columbus)^{12}	Lokomotiv Yaroslavl (KHL)
116	Samuel Meloche (G)	Canada	Buffalo Sabres (from Minnesota via Anaheim)^{13}	Rouyn-Noranda Huskies (QMJHL)
117	David Lewandowski (LW)	Germany	Edmonton Oilers (from Ottawa via Edmonton and Vancouver)^{14}	Saskatoon Blades (WHL)
118	Linus Funck (D)	Sweden	Colorado Avalanche	Lulea HF J20 (J20 Nationell)
119	Michal Svrcek (LW)	Slovakia	Detroit Red Wings (from Tampa Bay)^{15}	Brynas IF (SHL)
120	Caeden Herrington (D)	United States	Los Angeles Kings	Lincoln Stars (USHL)
121	Lirim Amidovski (RW)	Canada	Minnesota Wild (from Toronto)^{16}	North Bay Battalion (OHL)
122	Alex Huang (D)	Canada	Nashville Predators (from Vegas)^{17}	Chicoutimi Sagueneens (QMJHL)
123	Carter Klippenstein (C)	Canada	Minnesota Wild (from Washington)^{18}	Brandon Wheat Kings (WHL)
124	Zack Sharp (D)	United States	San Jose Sharks (from Winnipeg via San Jose and Dallas)^{19}	Western Michigan Broncos (NCHC)
125	Jimmy Lombardi (C)	Canada	Los Angeles Kings (from Carolina)^{20}	Flint Firebirds (OHL)
126	Brandon Gorzynski (C)	United States	Dallas Stars (from Dallas via NY Rangers and Seattle)^{21}	Calgary Hitmen (WHL)
127	Aiden Foster (C)	Canada	Tampa Bay Lightning (from Edmonton)^{22}	Prince George Cougars (WHL)
128	Shea Busch (LW)	Canada	Florida Panthers	Everett Silvertips (WHL)

Notes

1. The San Jose Sharks' fourth-round pick went to the Ottawa Senators as the result of a trade on March 7, 2025, that sent Noah Gregor, Zack Ostapchuk and a second-round pick in 2025 to San Jose in exchange for Tristen Robins, Fabian Zetterlund and this pick.
2. The Nashville Predators' fourth-round pick went to the New Jersey Devils as the result of a trade on June 18, 2025, that sent Erik Haula to Nashville in exchange for Jeremy Hanzel and this pick.
3. The Philadelphia Flyers' fourth-round pick went to the Boston Bruins as the result of a trade on March 7, 2025, that sent Brandon Carlo to Toronto in exchange for Fraser Minten, a conditional first-round pick in 2026 and this pick.
  Toronto previously acquired this pick as the result of a trade on March 7, 2025, that sent Nikita Grebenkin and a conditional first-round pick in 2027 to Philadelphia in exchange for Scott Laughton, a sixth-round pick in 2027 and this pick.
4. The Boston Bruins' fourth-round pick went to the Anaheim Ducks as the result of a trade on July 3, 2024, that sent Gage Alexander to Detroit in exchange for Robby Fabbri and this pick (being conditional at the time of the trade). The condition – Anaheim will receive the higher of Boston or Detroit's fourth-round picks in 2025 – was converted when Boston could no longer finish better than Detroit on April 10, 2025.
  Detroit previously acquired this pick as the result of a trade on March 2, 2023, that sent Tyler Bertuzzi to Boston in exchange for a conditional first-round pick in 2024 and this pick.
5. The Seattle Kraken's fourth-round pick went to the Minnesota Wild as the result of a trade on June 26, 2025, that sent Frederick Gaudreau to Seattle in exchange for this pick.
6. The Anaheim Ducks' re-acquired their fourth-round pick as the result of a trade on June 12, 2025, that sent Carey Terrance and a third-round pick in 2025 to New York in exchange for Chris Kreider and this pick.
  New York previously acquired this pick as the result of a trade on December 6, 2024, that sent Jacob Trouba to Anaheim in exchange for Urho Vaakanainen and this pick (being conditional at the time of the trade). The condition – New York will receive the lower of Anaheim or Detroit's fourth-round pick in 2025 – was converted when Boston could no longer finish better than Anaheim and Detroit on April 10, 2025.
7. The New York Rangers' fourth-round pick went to the Chicago Blackhawks as the result of a three-team trade on February 28, 2023, that sent Patrick Kane and Cooper Zech to New York in exchange for Andy Welinski, a conditional second-round pick in 2023 and this pick.
8. The Detroit Red Wings' fourth-round pick went to the Tampa Bay Lightning as the result of a trade on June 28, 2025, that sent a fourth-round pick in 2026 to Boston in exchange for this pick.
  Boston previously acquired this pick as the result of a trade on June 28, 2025, that sent a third-round pick in 2025 (69th overall) to Montreal in exchange for Vancouver's third-round pick in 2025 (79th overall) and this pick.
  Montreal previously acquired this pick as the result of a trade on August 15, 2023, that sent Jeff Petry to Detroit in exchange for Gustav Lindstrom and this pick (being conditional at the time of the trade). The condition – Montreal will receive the lower of Boston or Detroit's fourth-round picks in 2025 – was converted when Boston could no longer finish better than Detroit on April 10, 2025.
9. The Columbus Blue Jackets' fourth-round pick went to the Detroit Red Wings as the result of a trade on June 28, 2025, that sent a third-round pick in 2025 (76th overall) to Columbus in exchange for a fourth-round pick in 2026 and this pick.
10. The Vancouver Canucks' fourth-round pick went to the New York Rangers as the result of a trade on March 1, 2024, that sent Hank Kempf, Ryan Lindgren and Jimmy Vesey to Colorado in exchange for Calvin de Haan, Juuso Parssinen, a conditional second-round pick in 2025 and this pick (being conditional at the time of the trade). The condition – New York will receive the higher of Colorado or Vancouver's fourth-round picks in 2025 – was converted when Vancouver failed to qualify for the 2025 Stanley Cup playoffs on April 9, 2025.
  Colorado previously acquired this pick as the result of a trade on October 6, 2024, that sent Erik Brannstrom to Vancouver in exchange for Tucker Poolman and this pick.
11. The Calgary Flames' fourth-round pick went to the Florida Panthers as the result of a trade on July 22, 2022, that sent Jonathan Huberdeau, Cole Schwindt, MacKenzie Weegar and a conditional first-round pick in 2025 to Calgary in exchange for Matthew Tkachuk and this pick (being conditional at the time of the trade). The condition – Florida will receive a fourth-round pick in 2025 if Calgary receives Florida's first-round pick in 2025 – was converted when the Panthers qualified for the 2025 Stanley Cup playoffs on April 5, 2025.
12. The St. Louis Blues' fourth-round pick went to the San Jose Sharks as the result of a trade on March 7, 2025, that sent Luke Kunin to Columbus in exchange for this pick.
  Columbus previously acquired this pick as the result of a trade on June 28, 2024, that sent Alexandre Texier to St. Louis in exchange for this pick.
13. The Minnesota Wild's fourth-round pick went to the Buffalo Sabres as the result of a trade on August 18, 2023, that sent Ilya Lyubushkin to Anaheim in exchange for this pick.
  Anaheim previously acquired this pick as the result of a trade on March 3, 2023, that sent John Klingberg to Minnesota in exchange for Nikita Nesterenko, Andrej Sustr and this pick.
14. The Ottawa Senators' fourth-round pick went to the Edmonton Oilers as the result of a trade on June 25, 2025, that sent Evander Kane to Vancouver in exchange for this pick.
  Vancouver previously acquired this pick as the result of a trade on August 18, 2024, that sent Vasily Podkolzin to Edmonton in exchange for this pick.
  Edmonton previously acquired this pick as the result of a trade on July 15, 2024, that sent Xavier Bourgault and Jake Chiasson to Ottawa in exchange for Roby Jarventie and this pick.
15. The Tampa Bay Lightning's fourth-round pick went to the Detroit Red Wings as the result of a trade on March 5, 2025, that sent Yanni Gourde to Tampa Bay in exchange for this pick (being conditional at the time). The condition – Detroit will receive the higher of Edmonton or Tampa Bay's fourth-round picks in 2025 – was converted when the Edmonton advanced to the Western Conference finals on May 14, 2025.
16. The Toronto Maple Leafs' fifth-round pick went to the Minnesota Wild as the result of a trade on February 18, 2023, that sent Ryan O'Reilly to Toronto in exchange for this pick.
17. The Vegas Golden Knights' fourth-round pick went to the Nashville Predators as the result of a trade on June 28, 2025, that sent Tampa Bay's second-round pick in 2025 (55th overall) to Vegas in exchange for a second-round pick in 2025 (58th overall) and this pick.
18. The Washington Capitals' fourth-round pick went to the Minnesota Wild as the result of a trade on June 28, 2025, that sent Declan Chisholm and a sixth-round pick in 2025 (180th overall) to Washington in exchange for Chase Priskie and this pick.
19. The Winnipeg Jets' fourth-round pick went to the San Jose Sharks as the result of a trade on February 1, 2025 that sent Cody Ceci and Mikael Granlund to Dallas in exchange for a first-round pick in 2025 and this pick (being conditional at the time of the trade). The condition – San Jose will receive Winnipeg's fourth-round pick in 2025 if Dallas fails to qualify for the 2025 Stanley Cup Final – was converted when Dallas was eliminated from the 2025 Stanley Cup playoffs on May 29, 2025.
  Dallas previously acquired this pick as the result of a trade on June 19, 2024, that sent Ty Dellandrea to San Jose in exchange for this pick.
  San Jose previously acquired this pick as the result of a trade on March 3, 2023, that sent Vladislav Namestnikov to Winnipeg in exchange for this pick.
20. The Carolina Hurricanes' fourth-round pick went to the Los Angeles Kings as the result of a trade on June 28, 2025, that sent Nashville's third-round pick in 2025 (67th overall) to Carolina in exchange for Dallas's third-round pick in 2026 and this pick.
21. The Dallas Stars re-acquired their fourth-round pick as the result of a trade on June 19, 2025, that sent Mason Marchment to Seattle in exchange for a third-round pick in 2026 and this pick.
  Seattle previously acquired this pick as the result of a trade on March 6, 2024, that sent Alexander Wennberg to New York in exchange for a second-round pick in 2024 and this pick (being conditional at the time of the trade). The condition – Seattle will receive a fourth-round pick in 2025 if Lundkvist does not score a combined 55 points in the 2022–23 NHL season and 2023–24 NHL season – was converted on April 17, 2024.
  The Rangers previously acquired this pick as the result of a trade on September 20, 2022, that sent Nils Lundkvist to Dallas in exchange for a conditional first-round pick in 2023 and this conditional pick.
22. The Edmonton Oilers' fourth-round pick went to the Tampa Bay Lightning as the result of a trade on March 6, 2024, that sent Adam Henrique to Edmonton in exchange for this pick (being conditional at the time of the trade). The condition – Tampa Bay will receive a fourth-round pick in 2025 if Edmonton does not win the Stanley Cup in 2024 – was converted when the Oilers lost the 2024 Stanley Cup Final on June 24, 2024.

=== Round five ===
#	Player	Nationality	NHL team	College/junior/club team
129	Shamar Moses (RW)	Canada	Florida Panthers (from San Jose)^{1}	North Bay Battalion (OHL)
130	Ryan Miller (C)	Canada	Pittsburgh Penguins (from Chicago via Toronto and Washington)^{2}	Portland Winterhawks (WHL)
131	Asher Barnett (D)	United States	Edmonton Oilers (from Nashville)^{3}	U.S. NTDP (USHL)
132	Max Westergard (LW)	Finland	Philadelphia Flyers	Frolunda HC J20 (J20 Nationell)
133	Cole Chandler (C)	Canada	Boston Bruins	Shawinigan Cataractes (QMJHL)
134	Maxim Agafonov (D)	Russia	Seattle Kraken	Ufa Tolpar (MHL)
135	Noah Laberge (D)	Canada	Buffalo Sabres	Acadie–Bathurst Titan (QMJHL)
136	Alexis Mathieu (D)	Canada	Anaheim Ducks	Baie-Comeau Drakkar (QMJHL)
137	William Belle (RW)	United States	Toronto Maple Leafs (from Pittsburgh)^{4}	U.S. NTDP (USHL)
138	Sam Laurila (D)	United States	New York Islanders	Fargo Force (USHL)
139	Zeb Lindgren (D)	Sweden	New York Rangers	Skelleftea AIK J20 (J20 Nationell)
140	Nikita Tyurin (D)	Russia	Detroit Red Wings	JHC Spartak (MHL)
141	Justin Kipkie (D)	Canada	Minnesota Wild (from Columbus)^{5}	Victoria Royals (WHL)
142	Ivan Tkach-Tkachenko (G)	Russia	Utah Mammoth	Ufa Tolpar (MHL)
143	Wilson Bjorck (C)	Sweden	Vancouver Canucks	Djurgardens IF (HockeyAllsvenskan)
144	Ethan Wyttenbach (LW)	United States	Calgary Flames	Sioux Falls Stampede (USHL)
145	Alexis Cournoyer (G)	Canada	Montreal Canadiens	Cape Breton Eagles (QMJHL)
146	Atte Joki (C)	Finland	Dallas Stars (from New Jersey)^{6}	Lukko U20 (U20 SM-sarja)
147	Mikhail Fyodorov (RW)	Russia	St. Louis Blues	Stalnye Lisy (MHL)
148	Quinn Beauchesne (D)	Canada	Pittsburgh Penguins (from Minnesota via NY Rangers)^{7}	Guelph Storm (OHL)
149	Dmitri Isayev (LW)	Russia	Ottawa Senators	JHC Avto (MHL)
150	Max Heise (C)	Canada	San Jose Sharks (from Colorado)^{8}	Penticton Vees (BCHL)
151	Everett Baldwin (D)	United States	Tampa Bay Lightning	St. George's Dragons (USHS-Prep)
152	Petteri Rimpinen (G)	Finland	Los Angeles Kings	Kiekko-Espoo (Liiga)
153	Harry Nansi (RW)	Canada	Toronto Maple Leafs	Owen Sound Attack (OHL)
154	Jordan Charron (RW)	Canada	Pittsburgh Penguins (from Vegas)^{9}	Sault Ste. Marie Greyhounds (OHL)
155	Jackson Crowder (C)	United States	Washington Capitals	Chicago Steel (USHL)
156	Viktor Klingsell (RW)	Sweden	Winnipeg Jets	Skelleftea AIK J20 (J20 Nationell)
157	Luke Vlooswyk (D)	Canada	Philadelphia Flyers (from Carolina)^{10}	Red Deer Rebels (WHL)
158	Mans Goos (G)	Sweden	Dallas Stars	Farjestad BK J20 (J20 Nationell)
159	Emile Guite (LW)	Canada	Anaheim Ducks (from Edmonton)^{11}	Chicoutimi Sagueneens (QMJHL)
160	Owen Griffin (C)	Canada	Columbus Blue Jackets (from Florida)^{12}	Oshawa Generals (OHL)

Notes

1. The San Jose Sharks' fifth-round pick went to the Florida Panthers as the result of a trade on July 1, 2023, that sent Anthony Duclair to San Jose in exchange for Steven Lorentz and this pick.
2. The Chicago Blackhawks' fifth-round pick went to the Pittsburgh Penguins as the result of a trade on November 12, 2024, that sent Lars Eller to Washington in exchange for a third-round pick in 2027 and this pick.
  Washington previously acquired this pick as the result of a trade on March 7, 2024, that sent Joel Edmundson to Toronto in exchange for a third-round pick in 2024 and this pick.
  Toronto previously acquired this pick as the result of a trade on February 27, 2023, that sent Joey Anderson, Pavel Gogolev, a conditional first-round pick in 2025 and a second-round pick in 2026 to Chicago in exchange for Sam Lafferty, Jake McCabe, a conditional fifth-round pick in 2024 and this pick (being conditional at the time of the trade). The condition – Toronto will receive a fifth-round pick in 2025 if McCabe plays in at least 50% of Toronto's games during the 2023 Stanley Cup playoffs and at least 25% of Toronto's games during the 2023–24 NHL season – was converted when McCabe played his 21st game of the season on December 14, 2023.
3. The Nashville Predators' fifth-round pick went to the Edmonton Oilers as the result of a trade on June 28, 2025, that sent a fifth-round pick in 2026 to Nashville in exchange for this pick.
4. The Pittsburgh Penguins' fifth-round pick went to the Toronto Maple Leafs as the result of a trade on March 7, 2025, that sent Connor Dewar and Conor Timmins to Pittsburgh in exchange for this pick.
5. The Columbus Blue Jackets' fifth-round pick went to the Minnesota Wild as the result of a trade on November 30, 2024, that sent Daemon Hunt, a conditional first-round pick in 2025, a third and fourth-round pick in 2026 and a second-round pick in 2027 to Columbus in exchange for David Jiricek and this pick.
6. The New Jersey Devils' fifth-round pick went to the Dallas Stars as the result of a trade on July 1, 2023, that sent Colin Miller to New Jersey in exchange for this pick.
7. The Minnesota Wild's fifth-round pick went to the Pittsburgh Penguins as the result of a trade on July 1, 2024, that sent Reilly Smith to New York in exchange for a second-round pick in 2027 and this pick (being conditional at the time of the trade). The condition – Pittsburgh will receive the lower of New York or Minnesota's fifth-round picks in 2025 – was converted when Minnesota clinched a playoff spot in the 2025 Stanley Cup playoffs on April 15, 2025.
  The Rangers previously acquired this pick as the result of a trade on November 25, 2022, that sent Ryan Reaves to Minnesota in exchange for this pick.
8. The Colorado Avalanche's fifth-round pick went to the San Jose Sharks as the result of a trade on December 9, 2024, that sent Mackenzie Blackwood, Givani Smith and a fifth-round pick in 2027 to Colorado in exchange for Alexandar Georgiev, Nikolai Kovalenko, a second-round pick in 2026 and this pick.
9. The Vegas Golden Knights' fifth-round pick went to the Pittsburgh Penguins as the result of a trade on June 28, 2025, that sent Ottawa's third-round pick in 2025 (85th overall) to Vegas in exchange for Washington's third-round pick in 2025 (91st overall) and this pick.
10. The Carolina Hurricanes' fifth-round pick went to the Philadelphia Flyers as the result of a trade on August 9, 2023, that sent David Kase to Carolina in exchange for Massimo Rizzo and this pick.
11. The Edmonton Oilers' fifth-round pick went to the Anaheim Ducks as the result of a trade on March 6, 2024, that sent Sam Carrick, Ty Taylor and a seventh-round pick in 2024 to Edmonton in exchange for a first-round pick in 2024 and this pick (being conditional at the time of the trade). The condition – Anaheim will receive a fifth-round pick in 2025 if Edmonton does not win the Stanley Cup in 2024 – was converted when the Oilers lost the 2024 Stanley Cup Final on June 24, 2024.
12. The Florida Panthers' fifth-round pick went to the Columbus Blue Jackets as the result of a trade on June 26, 2025, that sent Daniil Tarasov to Florida in exchange for this pick.

=== Round six ===
#	Player	Nationality	NHL team	College/junior/club team
161	David Rozsival (RW)	Czech Republic	New Jersey Devils (from San Jose)^{1}	Bili Tygri Liberec U20 (Czechia U20)
162	Ashton Cumby (D)	Canada	Chicago Blackhawks	Seattle Thunderbirds (WHL)
163	Daniel Nieminen (D)	Finland	Nashville Predators	Lahti Pelicans (Liiga)
164	Nathan Quinn (C)	Canada	Philadelphia Flyers	Quebec Remparts (QMJHL)
165	Kirill Yemelyanov (C)	Russia	Boston Bruins	Loko Yaroslavl (MHL)
166	Samuel Jung (RW)	Czech Republic	New York Rangers (from Seattle)^{2}	Karpat U20 (U20 SM-sarja)
167	Ashton Schultz (C)	United States	Buffalo Sabres	Chicago Steel (USHL)
168	Anthony Allain-Samake (D)	Canada	Anaheim Ducks	Sioux City Musketeers (USHL)
169	Carter Sanderson (LW)	United States	Pittsburgh Penguins	Muskegon Lumberjacks (USHL)
170	Burke Hood (G)	Canada	New York Islanders	Vancouver Giants (WHL)
171	Evan Passmore (D)	Canada	New York Rangers	Barrie Colts (OHL)
172	Will Murphy (D)	Canada	Detroit Red Wings	Cape Breton Eagles (QMJHL)
173	Victor Hedin Raftheim (D)	Sweden	Columbus Blue Jackets	Brynas J20 (J20 Nationell)
174	Ludvig Johnson (D)	Switzerland	Utah Mammoth	Zug U20 (U20-Elit)
175	Gabriel Chiarot (RW)	Canada	Vancouver Canucks	Brampton Steelheads (OHL)
176	Aidan Lane (RW)	Canada	Calgary Flames	St. Andrew's Saints (CISAA)
177	Carlos Handel (D)	Germany	Montreal Canadiens	Halifax Mooseheads (QMJHL)
178	Sigge Holmgren (D)	Sweden	New Jersey Devils	Brynas J20 (J20 Nationell)
179	Love Harenstam (G)	Sweden	St. Louis Blues	Skelleftea J20 (J20 Nationell)
180	Aron Dahlqvist (D)	Sweden	Washington Capitals (from Minnesota)^{3}	Brynas J20 (J20 Nationell)
181	Bruno Idzan (LW)	Croatia	Ottawa Senators	Lincoln Stars (USHL)
182	Reko Alanko (D)	Finland	Utah Mammoth (from Colorado via Nashville)^{4}	Jokerit U20 (U20 SM-sarja)
183	Viggo Nordlund (LW)	Sweden	Carolina Hurricanes (from Tampa Bay)^{5}	Skelleftea J20 (J20 Nationell)
184	Jan Chovan (C)	Slovakia	Los Angeles Kings	Tappara U20 (U20 SM-sarja)
185	Rylan Fellinger (D)	Canada	Toronto Maple Leafs	Flint Firebirds (OHL)
186	Alexander Weiermair (C)	United States	Vegas Golden Knights	Portland Winterhawks (WHL)
187	Gustav Sjoqvist (D)	Sweden	Vegas Golden Knights (from Washington)^{6}	AIK (HockeyAllsvenskan)
188	Edison Engle (D)	United States	Winnipeg Jets	Dubuque Fighting Saints (USHL)
189	Andrew MacNiel (D)	Canada	Montreal Canadiens (from Carolina)^{7}	Kitchener Rangers (OHL)
190	Dawson Sharkey (RW)	Canada	Dallas Stars	Acadie–Bathurst Titan (QMJHL)
191	Daniel Salonen (G)	Finland	Edmonton Oilers	Lukko U20 (U20 SM-sarja)
192	Arvid Drott (RW)	Sweden	Florida Panthers	Djurgardens IF J20 (J20 Nationell)

Notes

1. The San Jose Sharks' sixth-round pick went to the New Jersey Devils as the result of a trade on June 29, 2024, that sent Washington's third-round pick in 2024 to San Jose in exchange for Tampa Bay's third-round pick in 2024 and this pick.
2. The Seattle Kraken's sixth-round pick went to the New York Rangers as a result of a trade on December 18, 2024, that sent Kaapo Kakko to Seattle in exchange for Will Borgen, a third-round pick in 2025 and this pick.
3. The Minnesota Wild's sixth-round pick went to the Washington Capitals as the result of a trade on June 28, 2025, that sent Chase Priskie and a fourth-round pick in 2025 (123rd overall) to Washington in exchange for Declan Chisholm and this pick.
4. The Colorado Avalanche's sixth-round pick went to the Utah Mammoth as the result of a trade on June 28, 2025, that sent a sixth-round pick in 2026 to Nashville in exchange for this pick.
  Nashville previously acquired this pick as the result of a trade on November 30, 2024, that sent Scott Wedgewood to Colorado in exchange for Justus Annunen and this pick.
5. The Tampa Bay Lightning's sixth-round pick went to the Carolina Hurricanes as the result of a trade on March 30, 2025, that sent Lucas Mercuri to Tampa Bay in exchange for this pick.
6. The Washington Capitals' sixth-round pick went to the Vegas Golden Knights as the result of a trade on June 29, 2024, that sent a seventh-round pick in 2024 to Washington in exchange for this pick.
7. The Carolina Hurricanes' sixth-round pick went to the Montreal Canadiens as the result of a trade on June 28, 2025, that sent Pittsburgh's second-round pick in 2025 (41st overall) and a second-round pick in 2025 (49th overall) to Carolina in exchange for Chicago's second-round pick in 2025 (34th overall) and this pick.

=== Round seven ===
#	Player	Nationality	NHL team	College/junior/club team
193	Caleb Heil (G)	United States	Tampa Bay Lightning (from San Jose)^{1}	Madison Capitols (USHL)
194	Ilya Kanarsky (G)	Russia	Chicago Blackhawks	AKM Tula (MHL)
195	Melvin Novotny (LW)	Sweden	Buffalo Sabres (from Nashville)^{2}	Muskegon Lumberjacks (USHL)
196	Brendan McMorrow (C)	United States	Los Angeles Kings (from Philadelphia)^{3}	Waterloo Black Hawks (USHL)
197	Brendan Dunphy (D)	United States	Florida Panthers (from Boston via Chicago)^{4}	Wenatchee Wild (WHL)
198	Jeremy Loranger (C)	Canada	Columbus Blue Jackets (from Seattle)^{5}	Sherwood Park Crusaders (BCHL)
199	Yevgeni Prokhorov (G)	Belarus	Buffalo Sabres	Dinamo-Shinnik Bobruysk (MHL)
200	Brady Turko (RW)	Canada	Anaheim Ducks	Brandon Wheat Kings (WHL)
201	Kale Dach (C)	Canada	Pittsburgh Penguins	Sherwood Park Crusaders (BCHL)
202	Jacob Kvasnicka (RW)	United States	New York Islanders	U.S. NTDP (USHL)
203	Felix Farhammar (D)	Sweden	New York Rangers	Orebro HK (SHL)
204	Grayden Robertson-Palmer (C)	Canada	Detroit Red Wings	Phillips Andover Big Blue (USHS-Prep)
205	Karl Annborn (D)	Sweden	Seattle Kraken (from Columbus)^{6}	HV71 (SHL)
206	Roman Luttsev (C)	Russia	Tampa Bay Lightning (from Utah)^{7}	Loko Yaroslavl (KHL)
207	Matthew Lansing (C)	United States	Vancouver Canucks	Fargo Force (USHL)
208	Jakob Leander (D)	Sweden	Calgary Flames	HV71 J20 (J20 Nationell)
209	Maxon Vig (D)	United States	Montreal Canadiens	Cedar Rapids RoughRiders (USHL)
210	Richard Gallant (LW)	United States	San Jose Sharks (from New Jersey)^{8}	U.S. NTDP (USHL)
211	Yan Matveiko (LW)	Russia	Calgary Flames (from St. Louis via Detroit)^{9}	Krasnaya Armiya Moskva (MHL)
212	Grant Spada (D)	Canada	Tampa Bay Lightning (from Minnesota)^{10}	Guelph Storm (OHL)
213	Andrei Trofimov (G)	Russia	Ottawa Senators	Stalnye Lisy Magnitogorsk (MHL)
214	Nolan Roed (C)	United States	Colorado Avalanche	Tri-City Storm (OHL)
215	Marco Mignosa (RW)	Canada	Tampa Bay Lightning	Soo Greyhounds (OHL)
216	William Sharpe (D)	Canada	Los Angeles Kings	Kelowna Rockets (WHL)
217	Matthew Hlacar (LW)	Canada	Toronto Maple Leafs	Kitchener Rangers (OHL)
218	Loke Krantz (RW)	Sweden	Seattle Kraken (from Vegas via Columbus)^{11}	Linkoping HC J20 (J20 Nationell)
219	Ryan Rucinski (C)	United States	Buffalo Sabres (from Washington via San Jose)^{12}	Youngstown Phantoms (USHL)
220	Jacob Cloutier (RW)	Canada	Winnipeg Jets	Saginaw Spirit (OHL)
221	Filip Ekberg (RW)	Sweden	Carolina Hurricanes	Ottawa 67's (OHL)
222	Charlie Paquette (RW)	Canada	Dallas Stars	Guelph Storm (OHL)
223	Aidan Park (C)	United States	Edmonton Oilers	Green Bay Gamblers (USHL)
224	Yegor Midlak (G)	Russia	Florida Panthers	JHC Spartak (MHL)

Notes

1. The San Jose Sharksꞌ seventh-round pick went to the Tampa Bay Lightning as the result of a trade on March 7, 2024, that sent Jack Thompson and a third-round pick in 2024 to San Jose in exchange for Anthony Duclair and this pick.
2. The Nashville Predators' seventh-round pick went to the Buffalo Sabres as the result of a trade on March 3, 2023, that sent Rasmus Asplund to Nashville in exchange for this pick.
3. The Philadelphia Flyers' seventh-round pick went to the Los Angeles Kings as the result of a trade on March 7, 2025, that sent a third-round pick in 2027 to Philadelphia in exchange for Andrei Kuzmenko and this pick.
4. The Boston Bruins' seventh-round pick went to the Florida Panthers as the result of a trade on June 28, 2025, that sent a sixth-round pick in 2026 to Chicago in exchange for this pick.
  Chicago previously acquired this pick as the result of trade on June 13, 2025, that sent Victor Söderström to Boston in exchange for Ryan Mast and this pick.
5. The Seattle Kraken's seventh-round pick went to the Columbus Blue Jackets as the result of a trade on June 28, 2025, that sent a seventh-round pick in 2025 (205th overall) and Vegas's seventh-round pick in 2025 (218th overall) to Seattle in exchange for this pick.
6. The Columbus Blue Jackets' seventh-round pick went to the Seattle Kraken as the result of a trade on June 28, 2025, that sent a seventh-round pick in 2025 (198th overall) to Columbus in exchange for Vegas's seventh-round pick in 2025 (218th overall) and this pick.
7. The Utah Mammothꞌs seventh-round pick went to the Tampa Bay Lightning as the result of a trade on March 8, 2024, that sent a fifth-round pick in 2027 to the Arizona Coyotes in exchange for Matt Dumba and this pick.
8. The New Jersey Devils' seventh-round pick went to the San Jose Sharks as the result of a trade on March 8, 2024, that sent Kaapo Kahkonen to New Jersey in exchange for Vitek Vanecek and this pick.
9. The St. Louis Blues' seventh-round pick went to the Calgary Flames as the result of a trade on June 28, 2025, that sent a seventh-round pick in 2026 to Detroit in exchange for this pick.
  Detroit previously acquired this pick as the result of a trade on March 3, 2023, that sent Jakub Vrana to St. Louis in exchange for Dylan McLaughlin and this pick.
10. The Minnesota Wild's seventh-round pick went to the Tampa Bay Lightning as the result of a trade on November 8, 2023, that sent Zach Bogosian to Minnesota in exchange for this pick.
11. The Vegas Golden Knights' seventh-round pick went to the Seattle Kraken as the result of a trade on June 28, 2025, that sent a seventh-round pick in 2025 (198th overall) to Columbus in exchange for a seventh-round pick in 2025 (205th overall) and this pick.
  Columbus previously acquired this pick as the result of a trade on March 2, 2023, that sent Jonathan Quick to Vegas in exchange for Michael Hutchinson and this pick.
12. The Washington Capitals' seventh-round pick went to the Buffalo Sabres as the result of a trade on March 8, 2024, that sent Devin Cooley to San Jose in exchange for this pick.
  San Jose previously acquired his pick as the result of a trade on June 29, 2023, that sent Pittsburgh's seventh-round pick in 2023 to Washington in exchange for this pick.

== Draftees based on nationality ==
Rank	Country	Selections	Percent	Top selection
	North America	137	61.2%	
1	Canada	85	37.9%	Matthew Schaefer, 1st
2	USA	52	23.2%	James Hagens, 7th
	Eurasia	87	38.8%	
3	Sweden	30	13.4%	Anton Frondell, 3rd
4	Russia	21	9.4%	Pyotr Andreyanov, 20th
5	Czech Republic	11	4.9%	Radim Mrtka, 9th
6	Finland	8	3.6%	Lasse Boelius, 60th
7	Germany	4	1.8%	Maxim Schafer, 96th
8	Slovakia	3	1.3%	Michal Pradel, 75th
8	Belarus	3	1.3%	Arseni Radkov, 82nd
10	Norway	2	0.9%	Tinus Luc Koblar, 64th
10	Switzerland	2	0.9%	Elijah Neuenschwander, 104th
12	China	1	0.4%	Haoxi Wang, 33rd
12	Denmark	1	0.4%	Mads Kongsbak Klyvo, 112th
12	Croatia	1	0.4%	Bruno Idzan, 181st

=== North American draftees by state/province ===
Rank	State/province	Selections	Percent	Top selection
1	Ontario	37	16.5%	Matthew Schaefer, 1st
2	Quebec	17	7.6%	Caleb Desnoyers, 4th
2	Minnesota	17	7.6%	Logan Hensler, 23rd
4	Alberta	11	4.9%	Jackson Smith, 14th
5	British Columbia	7	3.1%	Benjamin Kindel, 11th
5	Manitoba	7	3.1%	Carter Bear, 13th
7	Illinois	5	2.2%	Ryker Lee, 26th
8	New York	4	1.8%	James Hagens, 7th
8	California	4	1.8%	Benjamin Kevan, 63rd
10	Michigan	3	1.3%	Will Horcoff, 24th
11	Saskatchewan	2	0.9%	Roger McQueen, 10th
11	Texas	2	0.9%	Blake Fiddler, 36th
11	Maryland	2	0.9%	Charlie Cerrato, 49th
11	Arizona	2	0.9%	Sean Barnhill, 70th
11	Wisconsin	2	0.9%	Kristian Epperson, 88th
11	Nova Scotia	2	0.9%	Brady Peddle, 91st
11	Massachusetts	2	0.9%	Teddy Mutryn, 95th
11	Prince Edward Island	2	0.9%	Will Murphy, 172nd
19	Maine	1	0.4%	Carter Amico, 38th
19	Missouri	1	0.4%	Shane Vansaghi, 48th
19	New Brunswick	1	0.4%	Will Reynolds, 68th
19	Pennsylvania	1	0.4%	L.J. Mooney, 113th
19	Vermont	1	0.4%	Caeden Herrington, 120th
19	Rhode Island	1	0.4%	Everett Baldwin, 151st
19	South Dakota	1	0.4%	Carter Sanderson, 169th
19	North Dakota	1	0.4%	Maxon Vig, 209th
19	Ohio	1	0.4%	Ryan Rucinski, 219th

== Draftees based on league ==
Rank	League	Selections	Percent	Top selection
	Canadian Hockey League (OHL, WHL, QMJHL)	91	40.6%	
	USHL + U.S. NTDP	42	18.8%	
	National Collegiate Athletics Association (B1G, NCHC, Hockey East)	9	4.0%	
1	Ontario Hockey League	39	17.4%	Matthew Schaefer, 1st
2	Western Hockey League	33	14.7%	Radim Mrtka, 9th
3	United States Hockey League	29	12.9%	Vaclav Nestrasil, 25th
4	J20 Nationell (Sweden-U20 Junior A)	22	9.8%	Theodor Hallquisth, 52nd
5	Quebec Maritimes Junior Hockey League	19	8.5%	Caleb Desnoyers, 4th
5	Molodezhnaya Hokkeinaya Liga (Russia-Junior)	19	8.5%	Pyotr Andreyanov, 20th
7	USA Hockey National Team Development Program	13	5.8%	Carter Amico, 38th
8	Swedish Hockey League	6	2.7%	Milton Gastrin, 37th
9	Liiga	5	2.2%	Lasse Boelius, 60th
9	U20 SM-sarja (Finland-Junior)	5	2.2%	Atte Joki, 146th
11	HockeyAllsvenskan (Sweden-2)	4	1.8%	Anton Frondell, 3rd
11	Big Ten Conference	4	1.8%	Logan Hensler, 23rd
11	U.S. High School	4	1.8%	Mason West, 29th
14	Hockey East Association	3	1.3%	James Hagens, 7th
14	Kontinental Hockey League	3	1.3%	Yegor Borikov, 110th
14	British Columbia Hockey League	3	1.3%	Max Heise, 150th
17	National Collegiate Hockey Conference	2	0.9%	Cullen Potter, 32nd
17	Czech Extraliga	2	0.9%	Vojtech Cihar, 59th
17	Conference of Independent Schools of Ontario Athletic Association	2	0.9%	Kieren Dervin, 65th
17	DHL Extraliga junioru (Czechia-Junior)	2	0.9%	Matous Kucharcik, 103rd
17	U20-Elit (Switzerland-Junior)	2	0.9%	Elijah Neuenschwander, 104th
22	Central Canada Hockey League	1	0.4%	Trenten Bennett, 99th
22	J18 Regional (Sweden-U18 Junior B)	1	0.4%	Vashek Richards, 100th

== Superlatives ==
Attribute	Value	Position	Player	Nationality	Draft position	Drafting team
Tallest	6 feet 8 inches (203 cm)	Goalie	Trenten Bennett	Canada	4th round (99th)	New Jersey Devils
Shortest	5 feet 7 inches (170 cm)	Centre	L.J. Mooney	USA	4th round (113th)	Montreal Canadiens
Heaviest	228 pounds (103 kg)	Defenceman	Mace'o Phillips	USA	3rd round (80th)	Calgary Flames
Lightest	148 pounds (67 kg)	Left Wing	Dmitri Isayev	Russia	5th round (149th)	Ottawa Senators
Youngest on draft day	17 years, 289 days	Centre	Mikkel Eriksen	Norway	4th round (111th)	New York Rangers
Oldest on draft day	20 years, 204 days	Goalie	Ilya Kanarsky	Russia	7th round (194th)	Chicago Blackhawks

== See also ==
- 2022–23 NHL transactions
- 2023–24 NHL transactions
- 2024–25 NHL transactions
- 2025–26 NHL transactions
- 2025–26 NHL season
- List of first overall NHL draft picks
- List of NHL players
