= Grebenkin =

Grebenkin (Russian: Гребёнкин; masculine) or Grebenkina (Russian: Гребёнкина; feminine) is a Russian surname. Notable people with the surname include:

- Alexander Grebenkin, Russian cosmonaut
- Anastasia Grebenkina, Russian ice dancer
- Nikita Grebenkin, Russian ice hockey player
