= Alexander Zharovsky =

Russian ice hockey player

- Born: 22 February 2007 (age 19) Klin, Russia
- Height: 6 ft 2 in (188 cm)
- Weight: 176 lb (80 kg; 12 st 8 lb)
- Position: Right wing
- Shoots: Left
- KHL team: Salavat Yulaev Ufa
- NHL draft: 34th overall, 2025; Montreal Canadiens

Alexander Sergeevich Zharovsky (Russian: Александр Сергеевич Жаровский; born 22 February 2007) is a Russian professional ice hockey player who is a right winger for Salavat Yulaev Ufa of the Kontinental Hockey League (KHL). He was selected in the second round, 34th overall, by the Montreal Canadiens in the 2025 NHL entry draft.

== Playing career ==
=== Russia ===
During the course of the 2024–25 Junior Hockey League (MHL) season, Zharovsky played for Tolpar Ufa where he finished as their top scorer and was named as the MHL's Best Rookie. He then made his Kontinental Hockey League (KHL) debut with Salavat Yulaev Ufa amidst the Gagarin Cup playoffs on 21 April 2025. That June, Zharovsky was selected 34th overall in the 2025 NHL entry draft by the Montreal Canadiens.

Graduating to the KHL ranks full-time for the 2025–26 season, his exceptional play was rewarded with selection to the annual league All-Star Game along with Alexei Cherepanov Award honours as Rookie of the Year. Zharovsky's 42 points (16 goals, 26 assists) established a new scoring record by an under-19 skater, surpassing the previous mark set by Eeli Tolvanen (36) in 2017–18.

== Personal life ==
Zharovsky was born in Klin and has been friends with fellow Canadiens draftee Ivan Demidov since childhood.

== Career statistics ==
			Regular season					Playoffs
Season	Team	League	GP	G	A	Pts	PIM	GP	G	A	Pts	PIM
2024–25	Tolpar Ufa	MHL	45	24	26	50	30	–	–	–	–	–
2024–25	Salavat Yulaev Ufa	KHL	–	–	–	–	–	7	0	1	1	2
2025–26	Salavat Yulaev Ufa	KHL	59	16	26	42	38	10	0	2	2	2
KHL totals			59	16	26	42	38	17	0	3	3	4

== Awards and honours ==
Award	Year	Ref
MHL
Best Rookie	2025	
KHL
All-Star Game	2026	
Alexei Cherepanov Award	2026	

== Records ==
Kontinental Hockey League:

- Most points by an under-19 player in a single season: 42 (2025–26)

Awards and achievements
Preceded by Ivan Demidov	Alexei Cherepanov Award; 2026	Succeeded by Incumbent
