= Valeri Nichushkin =

Russian ice hockey player (born 1995)

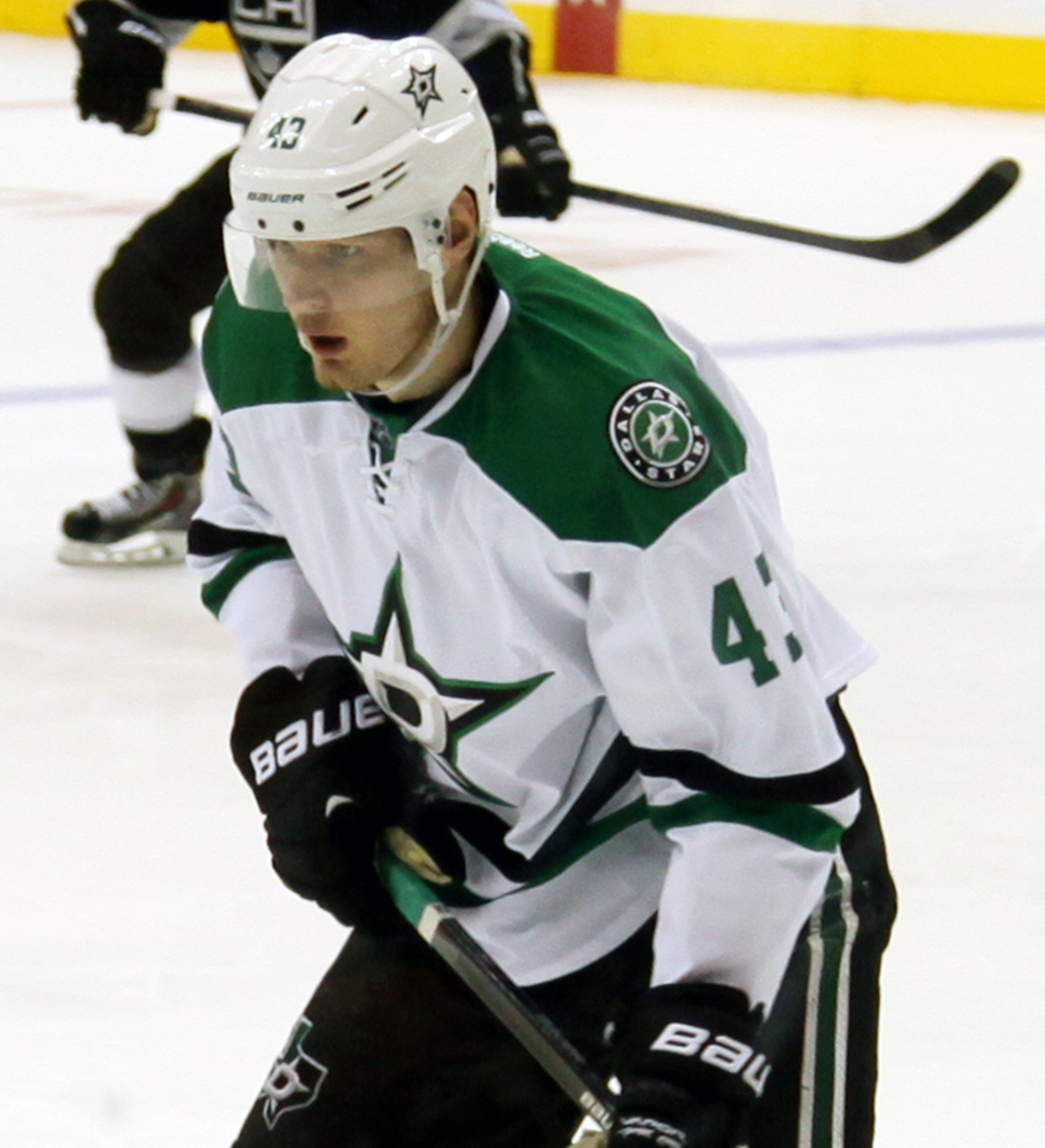
- Born: March 4, 1995 (age 31) Chelyabinsk, Russia
- Height: 6 ft 4 in (193 cm)
- Weight: 209 lb (95 kg; 14 st 13 lb)
- Position: Right wing
- Shoots: Left
- NHL team Former teams: Columbus Blue Jackets; Traktor Chelyabinsk; Dallas Stars; CSKA Moscow; Colorado Avalanche
- National team: Russia
- NHL draft: 10th overall, 2013; Dallas Stars
- Playing career: 2012–present

Valeri Ivanovich Nichushkin (Russian: Валерий Иванович Ничушкин; born March 4, 1995) is a Russian professional ice hockey player who is a right winger for the Columbus Blue Jackets of the National Hockey League (NHL). He was selected by the Dallas Stars in the first round, 10th overall, of the 2013 NHL entry draft. Nichushkin won the Stanley Cup with the Colorado Avalanche in 2022.

== Playing career ==
=== Early career ===
After one season in the Kontinental Hockey League (KHL), Nichushkin transferred from Traktor Chelyabinsk to Dynamo Moscow on May 1, 2013. He then signed a two-year contract with Dynamo. However, the deal was terminated conditionally, allowing Nichushkin to play in the NHL, or return to Dynamo if he failed to make the NHL team.

=== NHL and KHL ===
==== Dallas Stars ====
Nichushkin played his first regular season NHL game on October 3, 2013, against the Florida Panthers. He scored his first career NHL goal on November 3, against Craig Anderson of the Ottawa Senators.

Following a strong rookie season, registering 14 goals and 20 assists, Nichushkin suffered from hip and groin soreness in the beginning of his sophomore campaign in 2014–15. Five games into the season, Nichushkin opted for hip surgery, which was performed on November 18, 2014. He rehabbed in New Jersey and re-joined the team in March 2015, practicing in a red no-contact jersey.

==== CSKA Moscow ====
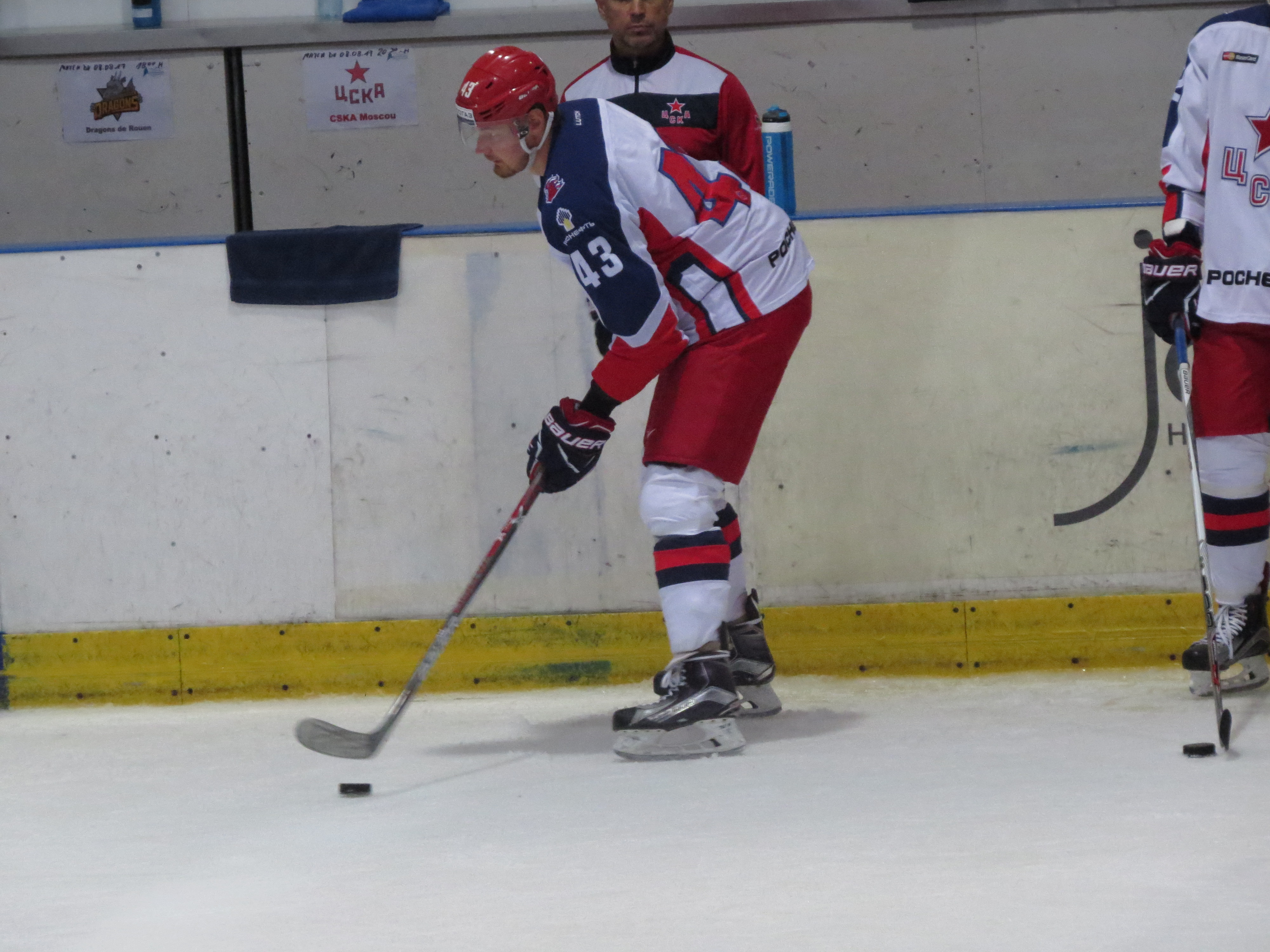
Nichushkin with CSKA in 2017.

As a restricted free agent following the conclusion of his entry-level deal in the 2015–16 season, Nichushkin and the Stars failed to agree to common grounds in contract negotiations. Unhappy with his role within the Stars lineup, his KHL rights were traded from Dynamo Moscow to CSKA Moscow on September 20, 2016. He subsequently signed a two-year contract to return to the KHL with CSKA, with his NHL rights to be kept by the Stars.

==== Return to Dallas ====
After two seasons with CSKA, Nichushkin returned to the Stars organization, in agreeing to a two-year, $5.9 million contract on July 1, 2018. In his return to the Stars in the 2018–19 season, Nichushkin recorded 10 assists in 54 regular season games, averaging 11:55 time on ice per game. He skated in one game during the playoffs with the Stars and failed to record a point.

After a disappointing 2018-19 campaign, failing to score a goal through 57 games, Nichushkin was placed on unconditional waivers by the Stars and subsequently bought out from the remaining year of his contract with the team on 30 June 2019.

==== Colorado Avalanche ====
Nichushkin signed a one-year, $850k contract with the Colorado Avalanche on August 19, 2019. Nichushkin scored his first goal in two years on November 23. In his first season with the Avalanche, generally perceived to be a successful one, Nichushkin especially received high praise from many hockey analytics proponents for his high rankings in many metrics, especially defensive metrics. Nichushkin finished the 2019–20 season with 13 goals and 27 points while leading all forwards in the NHL in defensive goals above replacement. Such strong defensive play helped Nichushkin to receive votes for the Frank J. Selke Trophy, the award given to the best defensive forward in the NHL, finishing eighth in voting.

On October 10, 2020, the Avalanche re-signed Nichushkin, who was a restricted free agent, to a two-year, $5 million contract extension.

In his third season with the Avalanche, Nichushkin was elevated to a top-six forward role, scoring a career-best 52 points in 62 games and adding 15 points in 20 playoff games. He placed third on the team with nine playoff goals to help the Avalanche claim their first Stanley Cup in 21 years. During the 2022 Stanley Cup Final, his four goals tied Joe Sakic and Alex Tanguay (2001) for the Avalanche record of most in a championship series.

On July 11, 2022, Nichushkin signed an eight-year, $49 million extension to stay with the Avalanche. The following season, Nichushkin continued his strong play with the Avalanche, recording 47 points in 53 games as Colorado won the division and matched up in the opening round of the playoffs against the expansion Seattle Kraken, who were making their post-season debut as a franchise. Nichushkin played in two games, recording one goal in game two. Shortly after, Nichushkin abruptly stepped away from the team for "personal reasons" amid an incident at a Seattle hotel. Nichushkin was reportedly found with an Eastern European woman suffering from severe alcohol intoxication; the woman was reported to be either a prostitute or victim of human trafficking. Despite the nature of the incident, the NHL and Seattle Police reported that Nichushkin would not face criminal charges and Nichushkin would have played if the Avalanche had moved on to the second round. Ultimately, the Kraken would claim an upset series victory, defeating the Avalanche in seven games.

On January 15, 2024, it was announced that Nichushkin had entered the NHL/NHLPA Assistance Program and would be unavailable for the team for an indefinite period while he received care from the Player Assistance Program. After completing the program, Nichushkin returned to the Avalanche lineup on March 8, in a game against the Minnesota Wild where he scored the overtime game winning goal. On April 28, Nichushkin recorded his first career NHL hat-trick in a 5–1 win over the Winnipeg Jets in game four of the first round of the 2024 Stanley Cup playoffs. The Avalanche would defeat the Jets in five games, but during the series against the Stars two weeks later, Nichushkin's season ended when he was given a six month suspension for having violated the terms set forth by the Player Assistance Program, and again entered the program, this time undergoing Stage 3.

On March 8, 2025, Nichuskin recorded his 1st hat trick in the regular season, with a 7–4 win over the Toronto Maple Leafs.

Nichuskin was involved in a car wreck on January 19, 2026, while traveling to Ball Arena and was ruled out for the Avalanche's game that day against the Washington Capitals.

==== Columbus Blue Jackets ====
On June 25, 2026, Nichushkin was traded from the Avalanche to the Columbus Blue Jackets in exchange for a 2026 second-round pick, a 2027 third-round pick, and a 2028 fifth-round pick.

== Career statistics ==
=== Regular season and playoffs ===
			Regular season					Playoffs
Season	Team	League	GP	G	A	Pts	PIM	GP	G	A	Pts	PIM
2011–12	Belye Medvedi Chelyabinsk	MHL	38	4	6	10	6	—	—	—	—	—
2012–13	Belye Medvedi Chelyabinsk	MHL	9	4	4	8	0	—	—	—	—	—
2012–13	Chelmet Chelyabinsk	VHL	15	8	2	10	4	—	—	—	—	—
2012–13	Traktor Chelyabinsk	KHL	18	4	2	6	0	25	6	3	9	0
2013–14	Dallas Stars	NHL	79	14	20	34	8	6	1	1	2	2
2014–15	Dallas Stars	NHL	8	0	1	1	2	—	—	—	—	—
2014–15	Texas Stars	AHL	5	0	4	4	12	—	—	—	—	—
2015–16	Dallas Stars	NHL	79	9	20	29	12	10	0	1	1	2
2016–17	CSKA Moscow	KHL	36	11	13	24	9	9	1	4	5	4
2017–18	CSKA Moscow	KHL	50	16	11	27	14	19	3	6	9	4
2018–19	Dallas Stars	NHL	57	0	10	10	0	1	0	0	0	0
2019–20	Colorado Avalanche	NHL	65	13	14	27	14	15	2	1	3	2
2020–21	Colorado Avalanche	NHL	55	10	11	21	4	10	1	2	3	10
2021–22	Colorado Avalanche	NHL	62	25	27	52	14	20	9	6	15	8
2022–23	Colorado Avalanche	NHL	53	17	30	47	2	2	1	0	1	0
2023–24	Colorado Avalanche	NHL	54	28	25	53	22	8	9	1	10	2
2024–25	Colorado Avalanche	NHL	43	21	13	34	8	7	3	1	4	0
2025–26	Colorado Avalanche	NHL	72	17	32	49	26	12	2	2	4	0
KHL totals			104	31	26	57	23	53	10	13	23	8
NHL totals			627	154	203	357	112	91	28	15	43	26

=== International ===
Medal record

Men's Ice hockey

Representing Russia

World Championships
Bronze medal – third place	2017 Germany/France	

World Junior Championships
Bronze medal – third place	2013 Russia	

Year	Team	Event	Place	GP	G	A	Pts	PIM
2012	Russia	U17	1st place, gold medalist(s)	5	3	3	6	0
2012	Russia	WJC18	5th	6	2	0	2	0
2013	Russia	WJC	3rd place, bronze medalist(s)	6	1	1	2	25
2013	Russia	WJC18	4th	6	4	3	7	0
2014	Russia	OG	5th	5	1	0	1	0
2017	Russia	WC	3rd place, bronze medalist(s)	6	0	3	3	0
Junior totals				23	10	7	17	25
Senior totals				11	1	3	4	0

== Awards and honours ==
Award	Year	Ref
KHL
Alexei Cherepanov Award	2013	
NHL
Stanley Cup champion	2022	

Awards and achievements
Preceded by Radek Faksa	Dallas Stars first-round draft pick 2013	Succeeded by Jason Dickinson
