= Alexei Cherepanov Award =

Annual award to a Kontinental Hockey League player

KHL Rookie of the Year Award
- Sport: Ice hockey
- Awarded for: Annually to the top rookie in the Kontinental Hockey League

History
- First award: 2009
- Most recent: Alexander Zharovsky

The Alexei Cherepanov Award is given out annually to the top rookie in the Kontinental Hockey League (KHL). It is named after Alexei Cherepanov who died on 13 October 2008 after collapsing during the third period of a KHL game, in the league's inaugural season. The award is determined by a vote among all KHL head coaches.

== Winners ==
Positions key
C	Centre
LW	Left wing
RW	Right wing
D	Defence
G	Goaltender

Player is still active in the KHL

Alexei Cherepanov Award winners
Season	Winner	Team	Position	Age (Note: Player's age at the time of award win)	Ref
2008–09	Ilya Proskuryakov	Metallurg Magnitogorsk	G	22	
2009–10	Anatoli Nikontsev	Avtomobilist Yekaterinburg	RW	19	
2010–11	Pavel Zdunov	Metallurg Magnitogorsk	LW	19	
2011–12	Dmitri Lugin	Amur Khabarovsk	RW	22	
2012–13	Valeri Nichushkin	Amur Khabarovsk	RW	18	
2013–14	Andrei Vasilevskiy	Salavat Yulaev Ufa	G	19	
2014–15	Maxim Mamin	HC CSKA Moscow	LW	20	
2015–16	Artyom Alyayev	Torpedo Nizhny Novgorod	D	21	
2016–17	Vladimir Tkachev	Admiral Vladivostok	LW	21	
2017–18	Vitali Kravtsov	Traktor Chelyabinsk	RW	18	
2018–19	Ilya Konovalov	Lokomotiv Yaroslavl	G	20	
2019–20	Artyom Galimov	Ak Bars Kazan	C	20	
2020–21	Egor Chinakhov	Avangard Omsk	RW	20	
2021–22	Arseni Gritsyuk	Avangard Omsk	LW	21	
2022–23	Nikita Grebenkin	Metallurg Magnitogorsk	LW	20	
2023–24	Ilya Nabokov	Metallurg Magnitogorsk	G	20	
2024–25	Ivan Demidov	SKA Saint Petersburg	RW	19	
2025–26	Alexander Zharovsky	Salavat Yulaev Ufa	RW	19	
