= Zeb Lindgren =

Swedish ice hockey player (born 2007)

- Born: 14 April 2007 (age 19) Umeå, Sweden
- Height: 6 ft 1 in (185 cm)
- Weight: 196 lb (89 kg; 14 st 0 lb)
- Position: Defenceman
- Shoots: Left
- SHL team: Skellefteå AIK
- NHL draft: 139th overall, 2025; New York Rangers
- Playing career: 2024–present

Zeb Lindgren (born 14 April 2007) is a Swedish professional ice hockey defenceman currently playing for Skellefteå AIK of the Swedish Hockey League (SHL). He was selected in the fifth round, 139th overall, by the New York Rangers in the 2025 NHL Entry Draft.

== Early life ==
Lindgren was born on 14 April 2007 in Umeå, Sweden. He began his youth hockey development playing within his hometown club, IF Björklöven, appearing for their U16 division 1 squad during the 2020–21 season. He later moved into the competitive junior pipeline of SHL organization Skellefteå AIK.

== Playing career ==
=== Junior ===
Lindgren advanced to Skellefteå AIK's under-20 program, becoming a regular top-pairing blue-liner on their J20 Nationell roster. During the 2024–25 season, he recorded four goals and 15 assists for 19 points across 38 regular-season games. His structural play caught the attention of regional talent evaluators; independent tracking metrics highlighted him as one of the most positionally sound defensive prospects in the J20 league, noting that he averaged 1.35 blocked shots per game and 0.86 loose-puck recoveries following shots.

=== Professional ===
Heading into the 2025 NHL Entry Draft, the NHL Central Scouting Bureau listed Lindgren ranked 20th overall among all European skaters. On 28 June 2025, he was selected in the fifth round, 139th overall, by the New York Rangers. Following his draft year, Lindgren integrated further into Skellefteå AIK's senior professional operations, receiving call-ups to the premier SHL level and appearing in 5 games for the senior team during the 2024–25 league calendar.

== Player profile ==
Scouting profiles define Lindgren as a highly mobile, high-IQ defensive defenseman who prioritizes low-risk puck distribution. Independent analysis highlights his skating posture and the power generated from his strides as his definitive developmental calling card. Analysts praise his excellent gap control, rush containment, and strength along the boards, identifying him as a potential bottom-four NHL asset built for penalty-kill situations. Because of his positional discipline and sound coverage within his own zone, initial draft evaluations compared his play style to former longtime NHL and Rangers defenseman Anton Strålman.

== Career statistics ==
=== Regular season and playoffs ===
			Regular season					Playoffs
Season	Team	League	GP	G	A	Pts	PIM	GP	G	A	Pts	PIM
2023–24	Skellefteå AIK	J20	22	2	2	4	8	8	0	1	1	0
2024–25	Skellefteå AIK	J20	38	4	15	19	76	9	0	1	1	8
2024–25	Skellefteå AIK	SHL	5	0	0	0	0	—	—	—	—	—
2025–26	Skellefteå AIK	J20	36	6	13	19	26	—	—	—	—	—
2025–26	Skellefteå AIK	SHL	2	0	0	0	0	—	—	—	—	—
SHL totals			7	0	0	0	0	—	—	—	—	—

=== International ===
Year	Team	Event	Result	GP	G	A	Pts	PIM
2024	Sweden	HG18	3rd place, bronze medalist(s)	5	0	1	1	6
Junior totals				5	0	1	1	6
