= Egor Chinakhov =

Russian ice hockey player (born 2001)

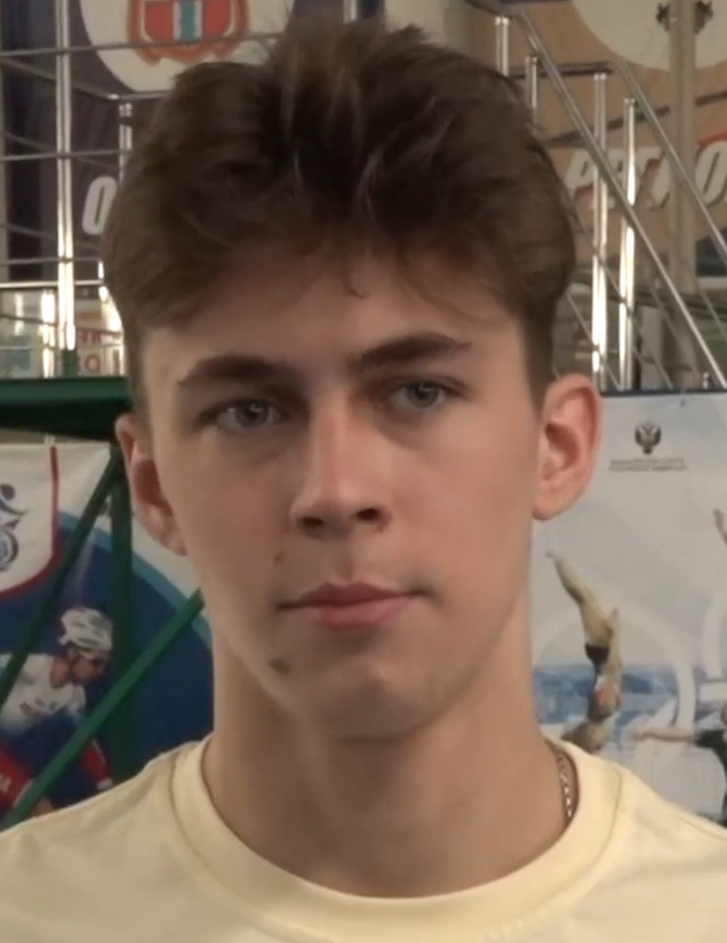
- Chinakhov in 2021
- Born: 1 February 2001 (age 25) Omsk, Russia
- Height: 6 ft 1 in (185 cm)
- Weight: 203 lb (92 kg; 14 st 7 lb)
- Position: Right wing
- Shoots: Left
- NHL team Former teams: Pittsburgh Penguins; Avangard Omsk; Columbus Blue Jackets
- NHL draft: 21st overall, 2020; Columbus Blue Jackets
- Playing career: 2020–present

Egor Vitalievich Chinakhov (Russian: Егор Витальевич Чинахов; born 1 February 2001) is a Russian professional ice hockey player who is a right winger for the Pittsburgh Penguins of the National Hockey League (NHL). He was selected 21st overall by the Columbus Blue Jackets in the 2020 NHL entry draft, for whom he played the first five seasons of his NHL career. Prior to his time in North America, he played in Russia's Kontinental Hockey League (KHL) for Avangard Omsk for one season. He was a Gagarin Cup champion with the team in 2021.

== Playing career ==
=== Avangard Omsk ===
Chinakhov played as a youth with his hometown club, Avangard Omsk. Following the 2018–19 MHL season, spent mainly with Omsk's Junior Hockey League (MHL) affiliate, he went undrafted in the 2019 NHL entry draft. He remained in the MHL for the 2019–20 season, improving his point totals tremendously.

At the 2020 NHL entry draft, the Columbus Blue Jackets made the surprising decision to select Chinakhov in the first round, 21st overall. While the consensus among scouts was that Chinakhov would be selected in the second or third round, there were very few public rankings that ranked him in the top 100, with many lists excluding him entirely. In their coverage of the draft, NBC Sports did not have any footage to share of Chinakhov as they did for every other first round selection and many in the following rounds.

Chinakhov made his professional debut in the 2020–21 season with Omsk's senior club, in the Kontinental Hockey League (KHL). He was named the Rookie of the Month for the month of September 2020, during which he recorded three goals and two assists in nine games, averaging 11 minutes and nine seconds of ice time. He finished with 10 goals and 7 assists for 17 points in 32 regular season games, leading all KHL players 20 years or younger in points-per-game (0.53). In the postseason, he added 5 goals and 7 points in 21 games to help the club win the Gagarin Cup for the first time in franchise history. He won the Alexei Cherepanov Award as the KHL Rookie of the Year Award for the 2020–21 season.

=== Columbus Blue Jackets ===
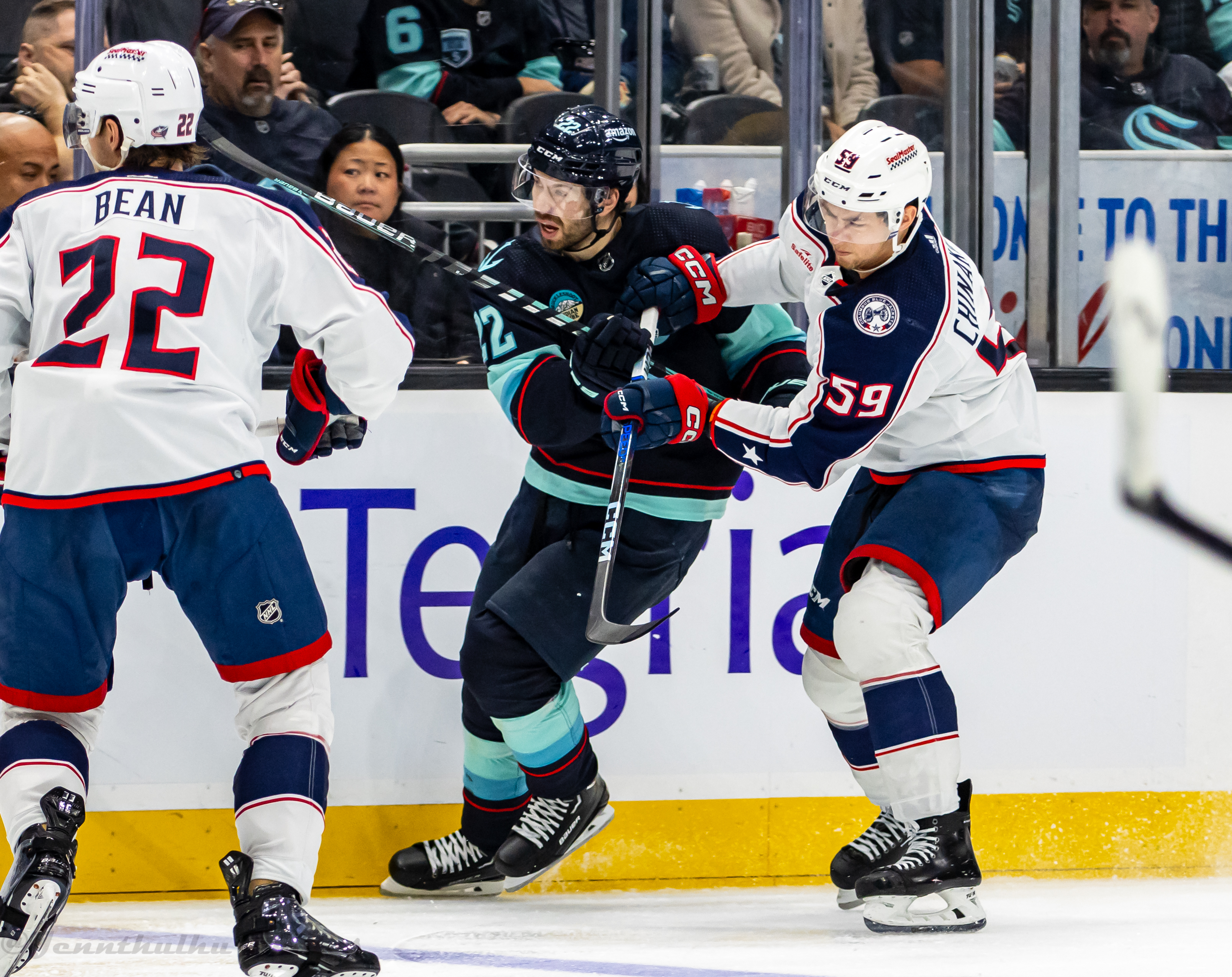
Chinakhov (right) battling with Oliver Bjorkstrand of the Seattle Kraken in 2024.

Chinakhov was signed by Columbus to a three-year, entry-level contract on 2 May 2021. On 15 November 2021, Chinakhov scored his first NHL goal, against Detroit Red Wings goaltender Thomas Greiss in a 5–3 Columbus win. He finished the 2021–22 season with 14 points in 62 games for the Blue Jackets.

Chinakhov played the beginning of the 2022–23 season with the Blue Jackets, improving his scoring rate to 13 points in 30 games, before suffering a high ankle sprain on 19 December 2022 and being placed on injured reserve (IR). After missing 29 games, he was activated from IR on 27 February 2023 and assigned to the Jackets' minor league affiliate, the Cleveland Monsters of the American Hockey League (AHL). He finished the season with 8 points in 7 AHL games. On 4 April 2023, Chinakhov signed a one-year contract extension with Columbus.

Chinakhov suffered a back injury in September 2023. He began the 2023–24 season on IR and was assigned to the AHL on 25 October 2023. He was recalled to Columbus on 3 November 2023. He suffered another back injury on 12 March 2024, and would miss the final 17 games of the 2023–24 season.

On 21 June 2024, Columbus signed Chinakhov to a two-year, $4.2 million contract extension. He suffered a back injury on 27 November 2024, and returned to the line-up on 4 March 2025 after missing 39 games.

During the 2025 offseason, Chinakhov requested a trade from the Blue Jackets, citing disagreements with head coach Dean Evason.

=== Pittsburgh Penguins ===
On 29 December 2025, Chinakhov was traded to the Pittsburgh Penguins in exchange for Danton Heinen, a 2nd-round pick in 2026, and a 3rd-round pick in 2027. Chinakov finished the season with a career high in games played, goals, assists, and points across his games with both Columbus and Pittsburgh.

On 5 July 2026, the Penguins announced that they had signed Chinakhov, a restricted free agent, to a three-year, $18.75 million contract to avoid contract arbitration.

== International play ==
Chinakhov represented Russia at the 2018 Hlinka Gretzky Cup, where he recorded one goal and two assists in five games, and won a bronze medal.

He represented Russia at the 2019 IIHF World U18 Championships, where he recorded two goals and one assist in seven games, and won a silver medal.

Chinakhov made his World Junior Championship debut at the 2021 championship, playing five games as Russia finished fourth.

== Personal life ==
Chinakhov is the son of former ice hockey player Vitali Chinakhov. Vitali was selected in the 11th round, 235th overall, by the New York Rangers in the 1991 NHL entry draft, but never played in the NHL.

Chinakhov married his wife, Zlata, in 2024. Their daughter was born on 25 February 2026.

== Career statistics ==
=== Regular season and playoffs ===
			Regular season					Playoffs
Season	Team	League	GP	G	A	Pts	PIM	GP	G	A	Pts	PIM
2017–18	Omskie Yastreby	MHL	4	1	4	5	2	—	—	—	—	—
2018–19	Omskie Yastreby	MHL	37	8	8	16	4	—	—	—	—	—
2019–20	Izhstal Izhevsk	VHL	2	2	1	3	0	—	—	—	—	—
2019–20	Omskie Yastreby	MHL	56	27	42	69	16	—	—	—	—	—
2020–21	Avangard Omsk	KHL	32	10	7	17	6	21	5	2	7	24
2021–22	Cleveland Monsters	AHL	1	1	0	1	0	—	—	—	—	—
2021–22	Columbus Blue Jackets	NHL	62	7	7	14	16	—	—	—	—	—
2022–23	Columbus Blue Jackets	NHL	30	4	9	13	10	—	—	—	—	—
2022–23	Cleveland Monsters	AHL	7	3	5	8	0	—	—	—	—	—
2023–24	Cleveland Monsters	AHL	3	3	1	4	2	—	—	—	—	—
2023–24	Columbus Blue Jackets	NHL	53	16	13	29	6	—	—	—	—	—
2024–25	Columbus Blue Jackets	NHL	30	7	8	15	4	—	—	—	—	—
2025–26	Columbus Blue Jackets	NHL	29	3	3	6	6	—	—	—	—	—
2025–26	Pittsburgh Penguins	NHL	43	18	18	36	4	6	0	0	0	0
KHL totals			32	10	7	17	6	21	5	2	7	24
NHL totals			247	55	58	113	46	6	0	0	0	0

=== International ===
Year	Team	Event	Result	GP	G	A	Pts	PIM
2018	Russia	HG18	3rd place, bronze medalist(s)	5	1	2	3	0
2019	Russia	U18	2nd place, silver medalist(s)	7	2	1	3	4
2021	Russia	WJC	4th	5	1	0	1	0
Junior totals				17	4	3	7	4

== Awards and honors ==
Award	Year
KHL
Gagarin Cup (Avangard Omsk)	2021
Alexei Cherepanov Award	2020–21

Awards and achievements
Preceded by Liam Foudy	Columbus Blue Jackets first-round draft pick 2020	Succeeded by Kent Johnson
