= Ivan Demidov =

Russian ice hockey player (born 2005)

- Born: 10 December 2005 (age 20) Sergiyev Posad, Russia
- Height: 6 ft 1 in (185 cm)
- Weight: 192 lb (87 kg; 13 st 10 lb)
- Position: Right wing
- Shoots: Left
- NHL team Former teams: Montreal Canadiens; SKA Saint Petersburg
- NHL draft: 5th overall, 2024; Montreal Canadiens
- Playing career: 2022–present

Ivan Alexeyevich Demidov (Russian: Иван Алексеевич Демидов; born 10 December 2005) is a Russian professional ice hockey player who is a right winger for the Montreal Canadiens of the National Hockey League (NHL). He was selected in the first round, fifth overall, by the Canadiens in the 2024 NHL entry draft.

== Playing career ==
=== Russia ===
Born in Sergiyev Posad on 10 December 2005, Demidov began training at a young age, particularly with the DYUSSH Dmitrov youth team. When Demidov was 12 years old, his father Aleksei quit his job as a truck driver to dedicate himself to his sons' hockey careers, while his mother Olga continued working as a retail saleswoman to support the family. His talent and commitment to the sport were demonstrated in his early performances across a variety of youth leagues and competitions, including the WSI U13 and U14 ranks. Demidov made waves with the Vityaz U16 team by the 2020–21 season, scoring 28 points in 11 games.

During the course of the 2022–23 Junior Hockey League (MHL) season, he played for SKA-1946 St. Petersburg alongside his older brother, Semyon, where they finished as the top two scorers of the team. The younger Demidov scored over 1.4 points per game, leading all skaters. He made his Kontinental Hockey League (KHL) debut with SKA Saint Petersburg at the age of 16 in November 2022, and also partook in the KHL All-Star Game the following month.

Over the course of the 2023–24 season, Demidov faced many setbacks, enduring three separate injuries which resulted in him missing half of the regular season. Nonetheless, he went on to lead his team to victory in the ensuing Kharlamov Cup and was named MVP for the second consecutive year, registering 60 points in only 30 games for an impressive 2.0 points per game pace.

The presumptive second overall pick entering the 2024 NHL entry draft due to his passing and goal-scoring abilities according to scouts, hockey insider Bob McKenzie speculated Demidov might fall on draft day as a result of the Russian invasion of Ukraine. He was ultimately selected fifth overall by the Montreal Canadiens, which was announced by prominent Canadian singer Celine Dion.

Despite limited playing time with SKA Saint Petersburg to begin the 2024–25 KHL season, Demidov was solid offensively, registering eight points (four goals and four assists) in the team's first ten games. For his efforts, he was named to the KHL All-Rookie Team as well as earning Rookie of the Month honors for September 2024. In December 2024, Demidov was recognized as KHL Rookie of the Month for the second time. Following the departure of SKA Saint Petersburg teammate Tony DeAngelo in mid-January 2025, Demidov was selected as his replacement as part of the annual league All-Star Game. On 28 January, he recorded his first professional hat-trick in a 4–1 win over Bobrov Division rival Vityaz. Days later, Demidov was revealed as Rookie of the Month honoree for the second consecutive month; his third time cumulatively over the course of the 2024–25 KHL campaign. On 4 February 2025, he would surpass fellow countryman Kirill Kaprizov for the most single season points registered by an under-20 player in league history with 43. Demidov would finish the regular season with 49 points (19 goals, 30 assists) in 65 games played.

Facing off against Dynamo Moscow in that year's Gagarin Cup playoffs, SKA Saint Petersburg would ultimately be ousted in six games. For his part, Demidov registered two goals and three assists in the series, and was subsequently named the best rookie of the first round by league officials. In May 2025, he received the Alexei Cherepanov Award, given to the KHL's rookie of the year.

=== North America ===
Following the end of his KHL season, Demidov had his contract with SKA Saint Petersburg terminated on 8 April 2025. The same day, he agreed to a three-year, entry-level deal with the Montreal Canadiens and joined the team for the remainder of the 2024–25 season.

On 14 April, Demidov made his National Hockey League (NHL) debut against the Chicago Blackhawks at Bell Centre, slotting onto Montreal's third line alongside Alex Newhook and Joel Armia. Registering a goal and assist in the first period, he became the second-youngest Canadiens skater and third teenager to score in their NHL debut (joining Mark Hunter and Bernie Geoffrion), while also becoming the second franchise player with a multi-point inaugural game prior to age 20, following Petr Svoboda in 1984–85. Thereafter, Demidov registered two assists in game 4 of the team's first round Stanley Cup playoffs series against the Washington Capitals, surpassing Henri Richard as the youngest player in franchise history to register a multi-point effort over the course of their inaugural NHL postseason appearance.

Entering play for the 2025–26 season, Demidov was primarily used on the Canadiens' second line alongside rookie centreman Oliver Kapanen. He posted 20 points in his team's first 26 games played through 3 December 2025, requiring the second-fewest games by a teenager in Canadiens franchise history to reach this output in their first full NHL campaign, trailing only Stephane Richer (who achieved this in 19 games in 1985–86). He was named the NHL Rookie of the Month for December 2025, a period in which he had four goals and 10 assists in 15 games. Ultimately appearing in all 82 games for Montreal, Demidov recorded 19 goals and 43 assists over his first full NHL campaign to lead all rookies league wide in points. He was widely credited with a key role in the Canadiens' improved performance over the season, which saw them finish sixth overall in the NHL. In recognition of his performance, the Professional Hockey Writers' Association voted him a finalist for the Calder Memorial Trophy, awarded to the NHL's rookie of the year. He was also named to the NHL All-Rookie Team. During the Canadiens' second round series against the Buffalo Sabres during the 2026 Stanley Cup playoffs, Demidov scored his first NHL playoff goal in a 6–3 victory in game 5 on 14 May.

On 1 July 2026, Demidov signed an eight-year, $73.2 million contract extension with the Canadiens. In preseason competition, he injured his foot blocking a shot near the end of a 21 September game against the Ottawa Senators. After appearing in the team's first two games of the 2026–27 season, it was announced he would miss two to four weeks in order to heal.

== International play ==
Medal record

Men's ice hockey

Representing Russia

Channel One Cup
Gold medal – first place	2024 Russia	

European Youth Olympic Festival
Bronze medal – third place	2022 Finland	

Hlinka Gretzky Cup
Gold medal – first place	2021 Czech Republic/Slovakia	

Internationally, Demidov won gold with Russia under-18 team at the 2021 Hlinka Gretzky Cup, recording five points in five games. He also earned a bronze medal shortly thereafter at the European Youth Olympic Festival (EYOF).

In late 2024, Demidov was chosen to the Russia senior team for the annual Channel One Cup. Registering five points across two games played, he was named the tournament's MVP as its top scorer.

== Career statistics ==
=== Regular season and playoffs ===
			Regular season					Playoffs
Season	Team	League	GP	G	A	Pts	PIM	GP	G	A	Pts	PIM
2021–22	SKA Varyagi	MHL	12	6	8	14	13	—	—	—	—	—
2021–22	SKA-1946	MHL	13	4	3	7	8	—	—	—	—	—
2022–23	SKA Saint Petersburg	KHL	2	0	0	0	0	—	—	—	—	—
2022–23	SKA Varyagi	MHL	3	0	2	2	4	—	—	—	—	—
2022–23	SKA-1946	MHL	41	19	43	62	16	10	5	8	13	6
2023–24	SKA Saint Petersburg	KHL	4	0	0	0	0	—	—	—	—	—
2023–24	SKA-Neva	VHL	1	0	0	0	0	—	—	—	—	—
2023–24	SKA-1946	MHL	30	23	37	60	20	17	11	17	28	37
2024–25	SKA Saint Petersburg	KHL	65	19	30	49	22	6	3	2	5	4
2024–25	Montreal Canadiens	NHL	2	1	1	2	0	5	0	2	2	0
2025–26	Montreal Canadiens	NHL	82	19	43	62	34	19	3	6	9	6
KHL totals			71	19	30	49	22	6	3	2	5	4
NHL totals			84	20	44	64	34	24	3	8	11	6

=== International ===
Year	Team	Event	Result	GP	G	A	Pts	PIM
2021	Russia	HG18	1st place, gold medalist(s)	5	2	3	5	4
2022	Russia	EYOF	3rd place, bronze medalist(s)	4	1	1	2	0
2024	Russia	COC	1st place, gold medalist(s)	2	3	2	5	0
Junior totals				9	3	4	7	4
Senior totals				2	3	2	5	0

== Awards and honours ==
Award	Year	Ref
KHL
All-Star Game	2022, 2025	
Alexei Cherepanov Award	2025	
MHL
All-Star Game	2023	
Most Valuable Player	2023, 2024	
Kharlamov Cup champion	2024	
NHL
Rookie of the Month	December 2025	
NHL All-Rookie Team	2026	

== Records ==
Kontinental Hockey League:

- Most points by an under-20 player in a single season: 49 (2024–25)

Awards and achievements
Preceded by David Reinbacher	Montreal Canadiens first-round draft pick 2024	Succeeded by Michael Hage
