= Nikita Grebenkin =

Russian ice hockey forward (born 2003)

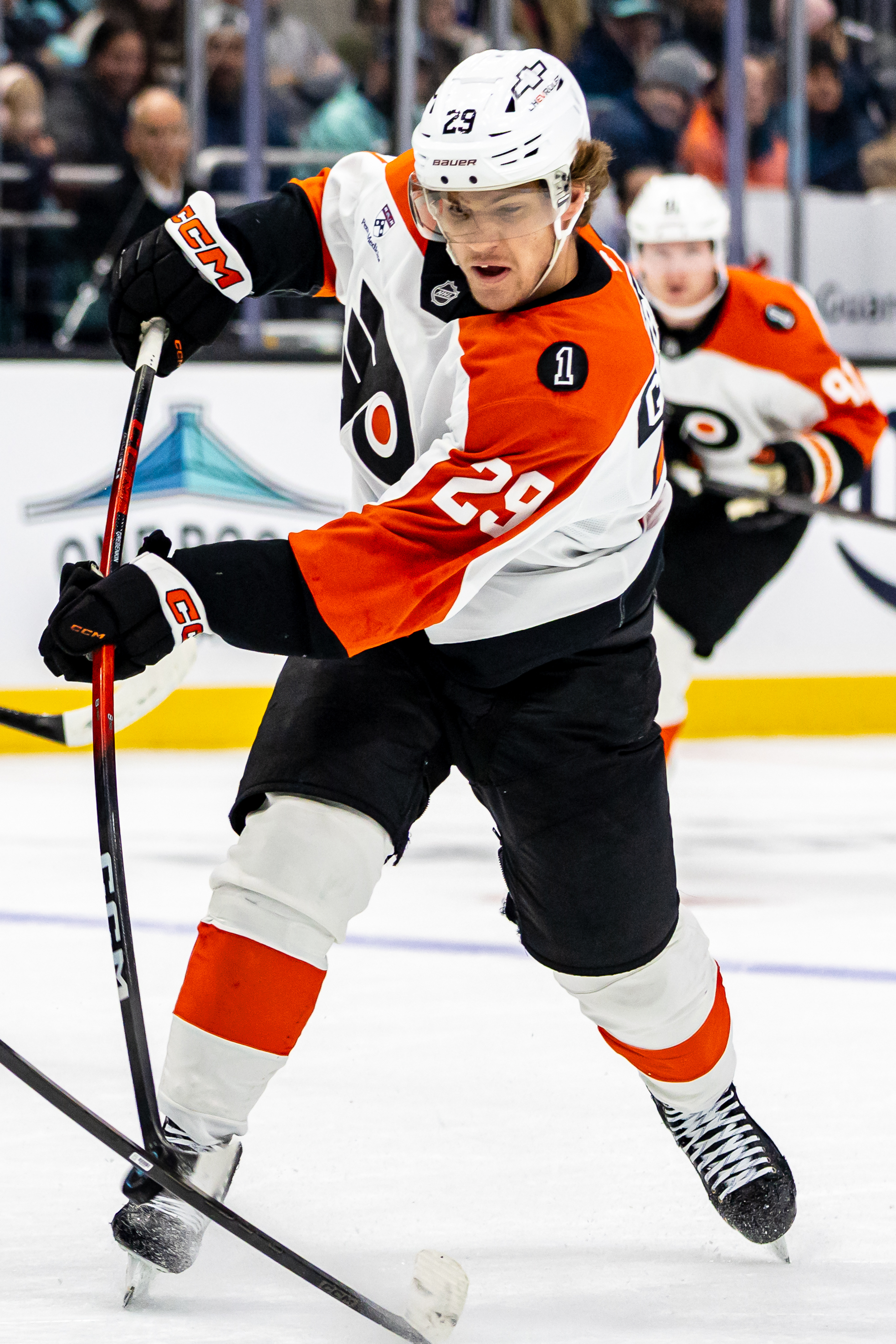
- Grebenkin with the Flyers in 2025
- Born: 2 May 2003 (age 23) Serov, Russia
- Height: 6 ft 2 in (188 cm)
- Weight: 209 lb (95 kg; 14 st 13 lb)
- Position: Right wing
- Shoots: Left
- NHL team Former teams: Philadelphia Flyers; Metallurg Magnitogorsk; Amur Khabarovsk; Toronto Maple Leafs
- NHL draft: 135th overall, 2022; Toronto Maple Leafs
- Playing career: 2021–present

Nikita Sergeevich Grebenkin (Russian: Никита Сергеевич Гребёнкин, born 2 May 2003) is a Russian professional ice hockey player who is a right winger for the Philadelphia Flyers of the National Hockey League (NHL). He was drafted in the fifth round, 135th overall, by the Toronto Maple Leafs in the 2022 NHL entry draft.

== Playing career ==
Grebenkin made his professional hockey debut with Metallurg Magnitogorsk of the Kontinental Hockey League (KHL) on 8 December 2021 in a 6–4 win against Kunlun Red Star, his sole KHL appearance of the season. He spent the majority of the 2021–22 season with Stalnye Lisy in the Russian Junior Hockey League (MHL) in which he scored 17 goals and 64 points in 58 games. Following this performance, Grebenkin was selected in the fifth round, 135th overall in the 2022 NHL entry draft by the Toronto Maple Leafs. It was his second year of draft eligibility; he had not been selected the year prior.

Metallurg loaned Grebenkin to Amur Khabarovsk for the majority of the 2022–23 KHL season, where he won the Alexei Cherepanov Award as the KHL's rookie of the year. The following year, Grebenkin was returned to Metallurg where the team won the 2024 Gagarin Cup. Following the season, he signed an entry-level contract with the Maple Leafs.

After playing his entire career to that point in Russia, Grebenkin moved to North America to join the Toronto Marlies, American Hockey League (AHL) affiliate of the Maple Leafs, for the 2024–25 season. After 13 games, over which he recorded four goals and ten points, he was called up to the Maple Leafs to replace an injured Max Domi, and made his NHL debut on 20 November 2024 in a 3–0 victory over the Vegas Golden Knights.

On March 7, 2025, Grebenkin was traded to the Philadelphia Flyers along with a conditional first round pick in the 2026 NHL entry draft in exchange for Scott Laughton and two draft picks.

== Career statistics ==
			Regular season					Playoffs
Season	Team	League	GP	G	A	Pts	PIM	GP	G	A	Pts	PIM
2020–21	Stalnye Lisy	MHL	54	12	22	34	30	5	0	3	3	33
2021–22	Stalnye Lisy	MHL	58	17	47	64	6	9	2	11	13	4
2021–22	Metallurg Magnitogorsk	KHL	1	0	0	0	0	—	—	—	—	—
2022–23	Stalnye Lisy	MHL	1	0	3	3	0	—	—	—	—	—
2022–23	Yuzhny Ural Orsk	VHL	4	1	2	3	0	—	—	—	—	—
2022–23	Metallurg Magnitogorsk	KHL	7	0	0	0	0	—	—	—	—	—
2022–23	Amur Khabarovsk	KHL	45	9	17	26	6	—	—	—	—	—
2023–24	Metallurg Magnitogorsk	KHL	67	19	22	41	17	23	3	3	6	6
2024–25	Toronto Marlies	AHL	39	9	12	21	34	—	—	—	—	—
2024–25	Toronto Maple Leafs	NHL	7	0	0	0	2	—	—	—	—	—
2024–25	Lehigh Valley Phantoms	AHL	11	3	4	7	9	7	1	3	4	0
2025–26	Philadelphia Flyers	NHL	55	4	10	14	46	—	—	—	—	—
KHL totals			120	28	39	67	23	23	3	3	6	6
NHL totals			62	4	10	14	48	—	—	—	—	—

== Awards and honors ==
Award	Year
KHL
Rookie of the Year	2023
Gagarin Cup champion	2024
