= List of NHL awards =

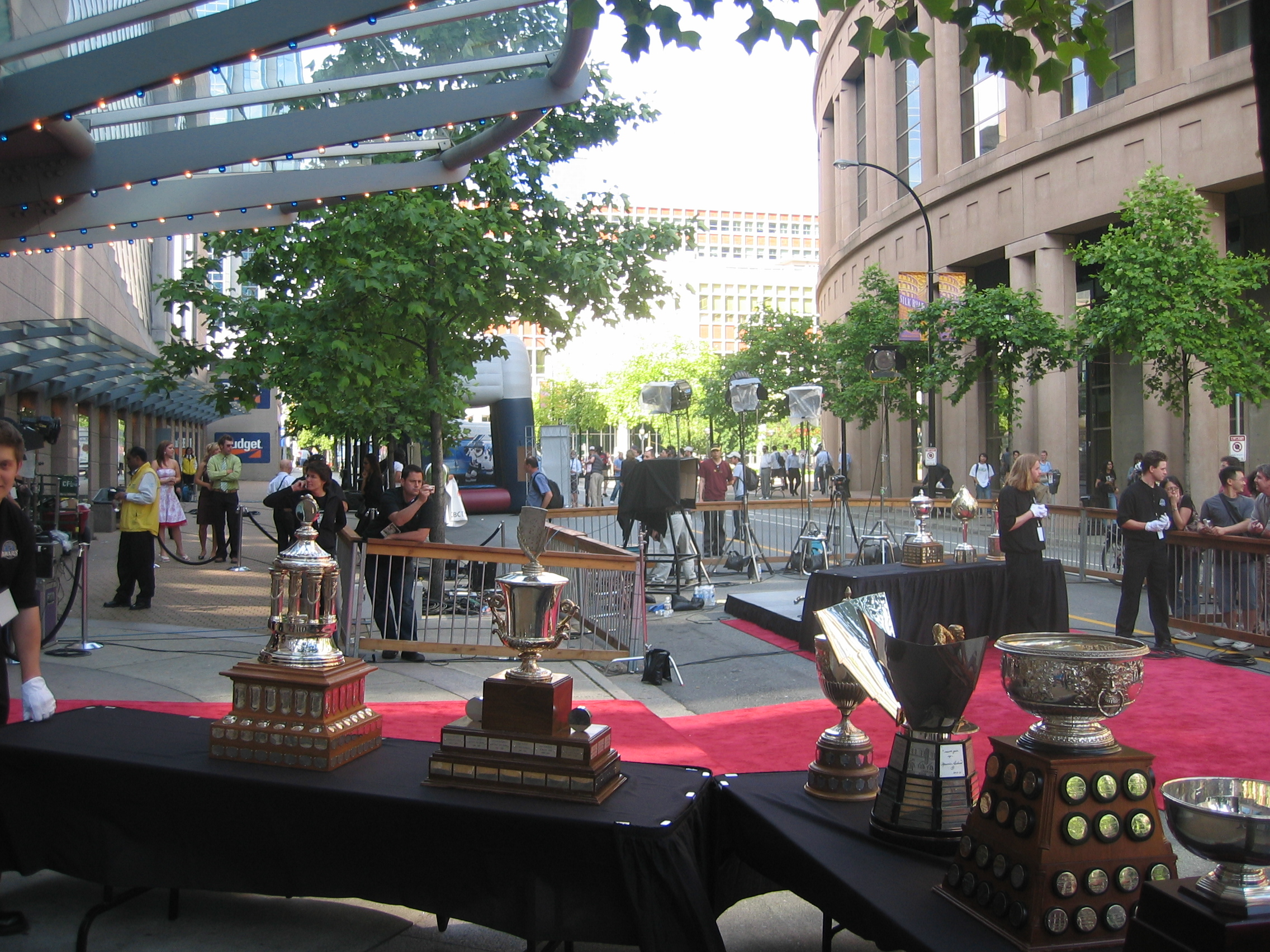
Trophies on display at the 2006 NHL Awards ceremony

The National Hockey League presents numerous annual awards and trophies to recognize its teams and players. The oldest, and most recognizable, is the Stanley Cup. First awarded in 1893, the Stanley Cup is awarded to the NHL's playoff champion. The Stanley Cup is the third trophy to be used as the league's championship, as for the first nine years of the NHL's existence, it remained a multi-league challenge cup.

Most of the trophies and all-star selections are presented at an annual awards ceremony held in late June after the conclusion of the Stanley Cup playoffs. The awards for the 2019–20 season were handed out during the last two rounds of the playoffs.

== History ==
=== Team trophies ===
The NHL's first championship trophy was the O'Brien Cup, which was created by the National Hockey Association in 1910 and transferred to the NHL in 1918, after which it was awarded to the playoff champion until 1927. Following the demise of the Western Hockey League after the 1926 season, the Stanley Cup became exclusive to the NHL, and the O'Brien Trophy became the Trophy awarded to the Canadian Division champion. After the 1938 season, the league reverted to one division, and the O'Brien Trophy was awarded to the Stanley Cup runners-up, until it was retired in 1950.

The Prince of Wales Trophy was introduced in 1925 as an award for the NHL's playoff champion (alongside the O'Brien Trophy). It soon became the American Division trophy following the 1927–28 season, until the 1937–38 season, when the league reverted to one division. It then became the award for best regular season record, before becoming the East Division trophy in 1967–68. The Prince of Wales Trophy remains an active award. It is awarded to the playoff champion of the Eastern Conference.

The Clarence S. Campbell Bowl was created in 1967 to serve as the Western Division counterpart to the Prince of Wales Trophy. It is now awarded to the Western Conference champion.

The youngest team trophy is the Presidents' Trophy. It has been awarded to the NHL's regular season champion since 1986.

=== Individual trophies ===
The first individual trophy was the Hart Trophy, first awarded in 1924 to the league's most valuable player. This trophy was replaced by the current Hart Memorial Trophy in 1960 when the original Hart trophy became too unwieldy. The Lady Byng Trophy followed in 1925, a year later, awarded to the most gentlemanly player in the league. Two years later, the Vezina Trophy was created for the NHL's top goaltender. The Conn Smythe Trophy was first awarded to the NHL's playoff most valuable player in 1965. Presently, the NHL has 18 annual individual trophies and awards, the most recently created being the Jim Gregory General Manager of the Year Award which was inaugurated in 2010.

Out of the original individual NHL trophies that were awarded prior to expansion (which would be followed by the creation of more individual awards), several players are tied with three awards in the same season. Stan Mikita won the Hart, Art Ross, and Lady Byng trophies, doing so consecutively in the 1966–67 and 1967–68 seasons. Guy Lafleur and Wayne Gretzky have each won the Art Ross, Hart, and Conn Smythe trophies, as well as the Cup, in 1976–77 and 1984–85, respectively. Bobby Orr won the Hart, Norris, and Conn Smythe trophies, along with the Stanley Cup, in 1969–70 and 1971–72. In 1970, Orr also won the Art Ross which makes him the only player to capture four original NHL awards in a single season (Orr also earned an NHL First Team selection, and the only honor which he was eligible for but did not win was the Lady Byng due to his physical style of play).

In addition, the First and second All-Star teams have been named since the 1930–31 NHL season to honor the best performers over the season at each position, as well as the NHL All-Rookie Team from 1983 onwards.

Some of these individual trophies are automatically awarded to players based on their statistics during the regular season, most notably the Art Ross Trophy, Richard Trophy and Jennings Trophy. Other individual trophies are voted on by the Professional Hockey Writers' Association or the team general managers.

== Team trophies ==
Image	Award	Created	Description	Current holder
	Stanley Cup	1893	Awarded to the NHL playoff champion. Previously it was a challenge cup (1893–1914) and then an interleague championship trophy (1915–26). Named after Lord Stanley of Preston, the 6th Governor General of Canada, who donated the original cup.	Carolina Hurricanes
	Prince of Wales Trophy	1925–26	Awarded to the Eastern Conference playoff champion. Previously awarded as the NHL playoff championship (1925–27), the American Division Champion (1928–38), the regular season championship (1939–67), East Division championship (1968–74) and Wales Conference championship (1975–93). Named after Edward, Prince of Wales, who donated the trophy to the league in 1924. It was first awarded to the winner of the first game in Madison Square Garden in 1925.	Carolina Hurricanes
	Clarence S. Campbell Bowl	1967–68	Awarded to the Western Conference playoff champion. Previously awarded as the West Division title (1968–74) and Campbell Conference championship (1975–93). Named after Clarence Campbell, the third NHL President.	Vegas Golden Knights
	Presidents' Trophy	1985–86	Awarded to the club finishing the regular season with the best overall record (based on points).	Colorado Avalanche
	O'Brien Trophy	1910	Awarded by the National Hockey Association (1910–17) and NHL (1918–27) to the league playoff champion, Canadian Division regular season champion (1928–38), and Stanley Cup runner-up (1939–50). It was originally donated to the NHA by Canadian Senator M. J. O'Brien, in recognition of his son, NHA founder Ambrose O'Brien.	Last awarded in 1949–50

== Individual trophies and awards ==
Image	Award	Created	Description	Current holder
	Hart Memorial Trophy	1923–24	Awarded to the "player judged most valuable to his team". The original trophy was donated to the league by Dr. David A. Hart, father of coach Cecil Hart.	Nikita Kucherov; Tampa Bay Lightning
	Lady Byng Memorial Trophy	1924–25	Awarded to the player who exhibited outstanding sportsmanship and gentlemanly conduct combined with a high standard of playing ability. Named after Lady Byng of Vimy, 40th viceregal consort of Canada, who donated the original trophy to the league.	Cole Caufield; Montreal Canadiens
	Vezina Trophy	1926–27	Awarded to the league's top goaltender. Named after goaltender Georges Vezina.	Andrei Vasilevskiy; Tampa Bay Lightning
	Calder Memorial Trophy	1936–37	Awarded to the league's most outstanding rookie player. Named after Frank Calder, the first NHL President.	Matthew Schaefer; New York Islanders
	Art Ross Trophy	1947–48	Awarded to the player who leads the league in total points at the end of the regular season. Named after player, coach and team executive Art Ross, who originally donated the trophy.	Connor McDavid; Edmonton Oilers
	James Norris Memorial Trophy	1953–54	Awarded to the defenseman who demonstrates throughout the season the greatest all-round ability in the position. Named after team owner James E. Norris.	Zach Werenski; Columbus Blue Jackets
	Conn Smythe Trophy	1965	Awarded to the most valuable player for his team in the playoffs. Named after coach and team owner Conn Smythe.	Jordan Staal; Carolina Hurricanes
	Bill Masterton Memorial Trophy	1967–68	Awarded to the player who best exemplifies the qualities of perseverance, sportsmanship, and dedication to hockey. Named after Bill Masterton, the only player in NHL history to die as the direct result of injuries suffered during a game.	Gabriel Landeskog; Colorado Avalanche
	Ted Lindsay Award	1970–71	Awarded to the NHL's outstanding player as selected by the members of the NHL Players Association (called the Lester B. Pearson Award from 1971 to 2009). Named after forward Ted Lindsay (and previously Lester B. Pearson, noted college athlete who became the 14th Prime Minister of Canada).	Connor McDavid; Edmonton Oilers
	Jack Adams Award	1973–74	Awarded to the NHL coach adjudged to have contributed the most to his team's success (i.e. Coach of the Year). Named after player, coach and general manager Jack Adams.	Jon Cooper; Tampa Bay Lightning
	Frank J. Selke Trophy	1977–78	Awarded to the forward who best excels in the defensive aspects of the game. Named after general manager Frank J. Selke.	Nick Suzuki; Montreal Canadiens
	William M. Jennings Trophy	1981–82	Awarded to the goaltender(s) having played a minimum of 25 games for the team with the fewest goals scored against it in the regular season. Named after team executive William M. Jennings.	Scott Wedgewood; Mackenzie Blackwood; Colorado Avalanche
	NHL Plus/Minus Award	1982–83	Awarded to the player with the highest plus/minus statistic in the regular season	Last awarded in 2007–08
	King Clancy Memorial Trophy	1987–88	Awarded to the player who best exemplifies leadership qualities on and off the ice and has made a noteworthy humanitarian contribution in his community. Named after player, coach and team executive King Clancy.	Marcus Foligno; Minnesota Wild
	NHL Foundation Player Award	1997–98	Awarded to the player who applies the core values of hockey to enrich the lives of people in his community.	Last awarded in 2016–17
	Maurice "Rocket" Richard Trophy	1998–99	Awarded to the top goal scorer in the regular season. Named after Maurice Richard, the first NHL player to score 50 goals in 50 games.	Nathan MacKinnon; Colorado Avalanche
	Roger Crozier Saving Grace Award	1999–2000	Awarded to the goaltender who has played a minimum of 25 games in the regular season and has the highest save percentage. Named after goaltender Roger Crozier.	Last awarded in 2006–07
	Mark Messier Leadership Award	2006–07	Awarded by former player Mark Messier, himself, to the player who exemplifies great leadership qualities to his team, on and off the ice, during the regular season.	Gabriel Landeskog; Colorado Avalanche
	Jim Gregory General Manager of the Year Award	2009–10	Awarded to the top National Hockey League General Manager. Renamed in November 2019 in memory of former league executive Jim Gregory after his death.	Bill Guerin; Minnesota Wild
	E.J. McGuire Award of Excellence	2015–16	Awarded by NHL Central Scouting to the draft prospect who best exemplifies the commitment to excellence through strength of character, competitiveness and athleticism. Named after former NHL Director of Central Scouting E. J. McGuire.	Alberts Smits

The league has also given some ephemeral awards over the years, including:

- NHL/Sheraton Road Performer Award – awarded to the player who accrued the most road points during the regular season. It was awarded to Joe Sakic of the Colorado Avalanche in 2004 and not subsequently.
- Scotiabank/NHL Fan Fav Award – awarded to a National Hockey League player based on fan voting. It was awarded to Roberto Luongo of the Vancouver Canucks in 2010 and not subsequently.
- NHL Lifetime Achievement Award – awarded to a National Hockey League veteran in recognition of their overall contributions to the league and sport. It has been awarded twice, first to Gordie Howe in 2008 and then to Jean Beliveau in 2009.

Starting in 2017–18 the NHL began awarding the Willie O’Ree Community Hero Award to two non-NHL players (one in Canada and one in the United States) who, through the game of hockey, have positively impacted their community, culture, or society.

== See also ==
- Lester Patrick Trophy - presented, in part by the NHL, for contributions to hockey in the United States, but not considered an NHL award
- Best NHL Player ESPY Award - presented by the American sports television network ESPN to NHL players
- Hockey Hall of Fame
- Sports Illustrated NHL All-Decade Team (2009)
- NHL All-Rookie team
- NHL All-Star team
- NHL All-Decade team
- NHL Quarter-Century teams
- NHL statistical records and milestones
