= E. J. McGuire Award of Excellence =

Annual NHL award

- Sport: Ice hockey

History
- First award: 2015; 11 years ago
- Most recent: Alberts Smits

The E. J. McGuire Award of Excellence is awarded annually to the National Hockey League draft prospect who best exemplifies the "commitment to excellence through strength of character, competitiveness and athleticism" as selected by NHL Central Scouting at the NHL entry draft. The award is named for former NHL Director of Central Scouting E. J. McGuire.

== Winners ==
Key

Player is active in the NHL

| Year | Winner | Drafting team | Ref |
|---|---|---|---|
| 2015 | Travis Konecny | Philadelphia Flyers | |
| 2016 | Neil Doef | (undrafted) | |
| 2017 | Nico Hischier | New Jersey Devils | |
| 2018 | Humboldt Broncos | — | |
| 2019 | Brett Leason | Washington Capitals | |
| 2020 | Zayde Wisdom | Philadelphia Flyers | |
| 2021 | William Eklund | San Jose Sharks | |
| 2022 | Lane Hutson | Montreal Canadiens | |
| 2023 | Connor Bedard | Chicago Blackhawks | |
| 2024 | Michael Hage | Montreal Canadiens | |
| 2025 | Michael Misa | San Jose Sharks | |
| 2026 | Alberts Smits | New York Rangers | |

== See also ==
- List of National Hockey League awards
