= Alexander Karmanov =

Moldovan ice hockey player (born 2008)

- Born: March 22, 2008 (age 18) Chișinău, Moldova
- Height: 7 ft 1 in (216 cm)
- Weight: 275 lb (125 kg; 19 st 9 lb)
- Position: Defenceman
- Shoots: Left
- OHL team: Windsor Spitfires
- NHL draft: 201st overall, 2026; San Jose Sharks

Alexander Karmanov (also Alexandru Carmanov, born 22 March 2008) is a Moldovan-Russian ice hockey player who is a defenceman for the Windsor Spitfires of the Ontario Hockey League (OHL). He was selected by the San Jose Sharks in the seventh round of the 2026 NHL entry draft. At 7 feet 1 inch (2.16 m), he is the tallest person to be drafted in the history of the National Hockey League (NHL).

== Playing career ==
Karmanov became interested in ice hockey at a young age after witnessing a game played on a frozen lake. However, his country, Moldova, has no ice rinks. Growing up, his family frequently traveled with him across the region, including to Ukraine, Romania, Slovakia, and Czechia, to give him opportunities to play. He moved with his mother to Podolsk, Russia, near Moscow, around age 10, after scouts who noticed him gave him an opportunity to join the youth academy at HC Vityaz. After spending several years at Vityaz, eventually playing for the team at the U16 level, he left Russia for Scranton, Pennsylvania, U.S., to play Tier I AAA hockey with the Wilkes-Barre/Scranton Knights U16 team in 2024.

Karmanov appeared in 20 games for Wilkes-Barre/Scranton in the Atlantic Youth Hockey League during the 2024–25 season, posting 11 goals and 12 assists. After the season, he was selected by the Brantford Bulldogs in the third round, 172nd overall, of the 2025 CHL Import Draft. Karmanov was the first Moldovan-born selection in the history of the CHL Import Draft. He was also a 14th-round selection in the United States Hockey League (USHL) draft. He joined the Bulldogs but was assigned to the Brantford Titans of the Greater Ontario Hockey League (GOHL) before the regular season. Karmanov played fifteen games for the Titans and tallied three goals and four assists. He was later released by Brantford before being acquired by the North Bay Battalion of the Ontario Hockey League (OHL).

Karmanov, standing at 7 feet 1 inch (2.16 m), became the tallest player in the history of the Canadian Hockey League (CHL) when he played for the Battalion. He appeared in twenty games for the team, recording two assists in the 2025–26 season. Karmanov was selected by the San Jose Sharks in the seventh round, 201st overall, of the 2026 NHL entry draft, becoming the tallest NHL draft pick in history and tallest recorded hockey player worldwide. He is also the first Moldovan-born NHL draft pick. He uses custom-made equipment, including a hockey stick that measures at 70 inches (180 cm), "more than half a foot longer than the longest models seen in the NHL". Karmanov committed to play college ice hockey for the Penn State Nittany Lions for the 2027–28 season. On November 20th, 2026, Karmanov got his first ever OHL goal playing with the Windsor Spitfires.

== Personal life ==
Karmanov was born on 22 March 2008 in Chișinău, Moldova. He holds dual Moldovan and Russian citizenship. He stood 6 feet 0 inches (1.83 m) by age 10 and 6 feet 11 inches (2.11 m) by his 16th birthday.

== Career statistics ==
			Regular season					Playoffs
Season	Team	League	GP	G	A	Pts	PIM	GP	G	A	Pts	PIM
2025–26	Brantford Titans	GOJHL	15	3	4	7	68	—	—	—	—	—
2025–26	North Bay Battalion	OHL	20	0	2	2	29	—	—	—	—	—
OHL totals			20	0	2	2	29	—	—	—	—	—
