= Liam Ruck =

Canadian ice hockey player (born 2008)

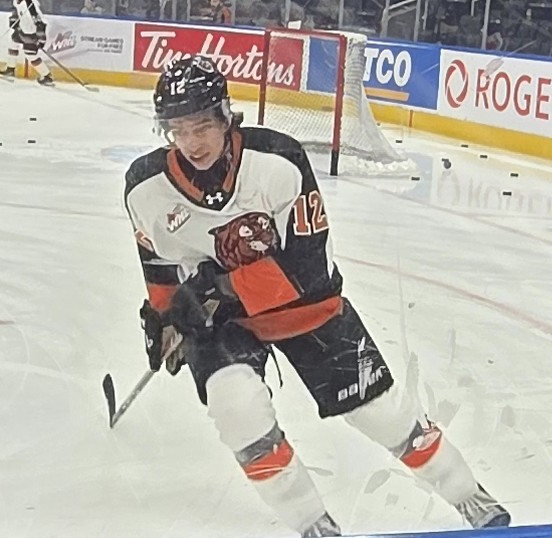
- Ruck with the Medicine Hat Tigers in 2026
- Born: February 21, 2008 (age 18) Osoyoos, British Columbia, Canada
- Height: 6 ft 0 in (183 cm)
- Weight: 177 lb (80 kg; 12 st 9 lb)
- Position: Right wing
- Shoots: Right
- WHL team: Medicine Hat Tigers
- NHL draft: 22nd overall, 2026; Pittsburgh Penguins

Liam Ruck (born February 21, 2008) is a Canadian ice hockey player who is a right winger for the Medicine Hat Tigers of the Western Hockey League (WHL). He is the identical twin brother of Markus Ruck. He was drafted 22nd overall by the Pittsburgh Penguins in the 2026 NHL entry draft. He is the identical twin brother of Markus Ruck, who is also a prospect to the Penguins.

== Playing career ==
Ruck and his twin brother were members of the Okanagan Hockey Academy in Penticton. With the U15 team, he scored 13 goals and 21 assists in 29 games during the 2021–22 season. He then posted 53 goals and 37 assists during the 2022–23 season, followed by 25 goals and 28 assists in 2023–24. Ruck was selected by the Medicine Hat Tigers in the first round, with the ninth overall pick, of the 2023 Western Hockey League (WHL) Prospects Draft. His brother was selected by the Tigers with the 21st pick of the first round.

Ruck appeared in three games for the Tigers during the 2023–24 season, recording a goal and an assist. In 2024–25, he appeared in 61 games, tallying 25 goals and 16 assists while he and his brother helped the team to a win at the WHL championship. After Gavin McKenna and Ryder Ritchie departed the Tigers, the Ruck twins saw expanded roles in 2025–26. For the 2025–26 season, they were the two leading scorers in the WHL. Appearing in 68 games, Liam totaled 45 goals and 59 assists for a total of 104 points, while his brother led the league with 108 points. They were both named first-team WHL Eastern Conference all-stars and were invited to the WHL Prospects Game, where they served as alternate captains.

Both brothers announced their commitment to play for the University of North Dakota beginning in the 2027–28 season on June 22, 2026.

Ruck and his brother were considered top prospects for the 2026 NHL entry draft. They were both selected in the draft by the Pittsburgh Penguins: Liam in the first round, with the 22th pick, and Markus in the second round, with the 39th pick.

== International play ==
Ruck and his brother both competed for Canada at the 2024 Winter Youth Olympics. Later that year, the two both played at the 2024 World U-17 Hockey Challenge and helped their team to the gold medal. Liam Ruck tallied four assists in five games at the tournament. The brothers also competed at the 2025 Hlinka Gretzky Cup and won a bronze medal, with Liam posting three points in five games.

== Personal life ==
Ruck was born on February 21, 2008, in Osoyoos, British Columbia. He and his brother Markus are identical mirror twins; according to The Athletic, "they do everything opposite. Markus is a left-handed shot who writes with his right hand. Liam is a right-handed shot who writes with his left hand. They bat, golf and throw a ball opposite." Markus was born first, by eight minutes. Their father, Derek, also played in the WHL. The brothers grew up in Osoyoos. At two years old, they began skating, and they also played baseball and soccer growing up. Since childhood, they have been best friends with Anaheim Ducks draft pick Mathis Preston, who was selected shortly after the twins.

== Career statistics ==
=== Regular season and playoffs ===
			Regular season					Playoffs
Season	Team	League	GP	G	A	Pts	PIM	GP	G	A	Pts	PIM
2023–24	Medicine Hat Tigers	WHL	3	1	1	2	0	1	0	0	0	0
2024–25	Medicine Hat Tigers	WHL	61	25	16	41	6	18	6	4	10	8
2025–26	Medicine Hat Tigers	WHL	68	45	59	104	36	14	8	4	12	6
WHL totals			132	71	76	147	42	33	14	8	22	14

Awards and achievements
Preceded by Will Horcoff	Pittsburgh Penguins first-round draft pick 2026	Succeeded by Incumbent
