= 2026 NHL entry draft =

North American hockey team selection

General information
- Date: June 26–27, 2026
- Location: KeyBank Center; Buffalo, New York, U.S.
- Networks: Sportsnet, TVA Sports (Canada); ESPN, ESPN+, NHL Network (United States)

Overview
- 224 total selections in 7 rounds
- First selection: (Canada) Gavin McKenna (Toronto Maple Leafs)

The 2026 NHL entry draft was the 64th draft for the National Hockey League. The draft was held on June 26–27, 2026, at KeyBank Center in Buffalo, New York. The first three selections were Gavin McKenna by the Toronto Maple Leafs, Ivar Stenberg by the San Jose Sharks, and Caleb Malhotra by the Vancouver Canucks.

A notable late-round pick was the Sharks' seventh-round pick, Alexander Karmanov. At 7 feet 1 inch (2.16 m), he was the tallest player ever drafted, and was the first Moldovan-born player ever drafted.

== Eligibility ==
Ice hockey players born between January 1, 2006, and September 15, 2008, were eligible for selection in the 2026 NHL entry draft. Additionally, undrafted, non-North American players born in 2005 were eligible for the draft; and those players who were drafted in the 2024 NHL entry draft, but not signed by an NHL team and who were born after June 30, 2006, were also eligible to re-enter the draft.

== Draft lottery ==
External videos
- Maple Leafs WIN 2026 NHL Draft Lottery..., NHL's official YouTube channel. May 5, 2026.
- NHL Draft Lottery: #2 Pick Revealed and final results, NHL's official YouTube channel. May 5, 2026.

Since the 2012–13 NHL season all teams not qualifying for the Stanley Cup playoffs have a "weighted" chance at winning the first overall selection. Beginning with the 2014–15 NHL season the NHL changed the weighting system that was used in previous years. Under the new system the odds of winning the draft lottery for the four lowest finishing teams in the league decreased, while the odds for the other non-playoff teams increased. As the league reduced the number of lottery drawings before the 2021–22 season, this resulted in two lotteries being held instead of three and since the 2022 draft lottery, the teams winning one of the two drawings are allowed to move up a maximum of ten spots in the draft order and a team is only allowed to win the lottery by moving up the order twice in a five-year period.

The Toronto Maple Leafs and San Jose Sharks won the two lotteries that were held on May 5, 2026. Seattle, Winnipeg, and Florida each dropped one spot, while Vancouver, Chicago, the New York Rangers and Calgary each dropped two spots. Vancouver, who finished last in the league, are the first team to fall the maximum number of spots in the draft while holding the best lottery odds since the Detroit Red Wings in 2020. Toronto notably won the first lottery with an 8.5% probability; heading into the draft lottery, they had a 56.2% chance of being advanced by one or more teams above them in the standings without winning either lottery, in which case they would have conditionally granted their top-five-protected pick to the Boston Bruins to fulfill a trade made in March 2025 that also sent Fraser Minten and a fourth-round pick in 2025 to Boston in exchange for Brandon Carlo. Instead, they will grant their first-round pick in 2027 or 2028 to Boston, with the other being granted to the Philadelphia Flyers.

Indicates team won first lottery
Indicates team won second lottery
Indicates teams that did not win a lottery

Complete draft position odds
Team	1st	2nd	3rd	4th	5th	6th	7th	8th	9th	10th	11th	12th	13th	14th	15th	16th
Vancouver	25.5%	18.8%	55.7%													
Chicago	13.5%	14.1%	30.7%	41.7%												
NY Rangers	11.5%	11.2%	7.8%	39.7%	29.8%											
Calgary	9.5%	9.5%	0.3%	15.4%	44.6%	20.8%										
Toronto	8.5%	8.6%	0.3%		24.5%	44.0%	14.2%									
Seattle	7.5%	7.7%	0.2%			34.1%	41.4%	9.1%								
Winnipeg	6.5%	6.7%	0.2%				44.4%	36.5%	5.6%							
Florida	6.0%	6.2%	0.2%					54.4%	30.0%	3.2%						
San Jose	5.0%	5.2%	0.2%						64.4%	23.5%	1.7%					
Nashville	3.5%	3.7%	0.1%							73.3%	18.4%	0.9%				
St. Louis	3.0%	3.2%	0.1%								79.9%	13.4%	0.5%			
New Jersey		5.3%										85.7%	8.9%	0.2%		
NY Islanders			4.3%										90.7%	5.1%	>0.0%	
Columbus				3.1%										94.7%	2.1%	>0.0%
Detroit					1.1%										97.9%	1.1%
Washington						1.0%										98.9%

== Top prospects ==
Source: NHL Central Scouting (April 16, 2026) ranking.

Ranking	North American skaters	European skaters
1	(Canada) Gavin McKenna (LW)	(Sweden) Ivar Stenberg (LW)
2	(United States) Chase Reid (D)	(Latvia) Alberts Smits (D)
3	(Canada) Carson Carels (D)	(Finland) Oliver Suvanto (C)
4	(Canada) Keaton Verhoeff (D)	(Sweden) Viggo Bjorck (C)
5	(Canada) Daxon Rudolph (D)	(Sweden) Elton Hermansson (RW)
6	(Canada) Caleb Malhotra (C)	(Finland) Juho Piiparinen (D)
7	(Canada) Tynan Lawrence (C)	(Sweden) Marcus Nordmark (LW)
8	(United States) Nikita Klepov (RW)	(Sweden) Malte Gustafsson (D)
9	(Canada) Ethan Belchetz (LW)	(Russia) Gleb Pugachyov (RW)
10	(Russia) Ilia Morozov (C)	(Lithuania) Simas Ignatavicius (RW)

Ranking	North American goalies	European goalies
1	(United States) Brady Knowling	(Russia) Dmitri Borichev
2	(Czech Republic) Michal Orsulak	(Russia) Yegor Rybkin
3	(Czech Republic) Tobias Trejbal	(Czech Republic) David Vermirovsky

== Selections by round ==
The order of the 2026 entry draft was finalized upon the conclusion of the 2025–26 NHL season, based on the draft lottery, final standings and playoff success. The Ottawa Senators chose last in the first round by order of the NHL, and resumed their regular placement in subsequent rounds.

=== Round one ===
Gavin McKenna was selected 1st overall by the Toronto Maple Leafs.

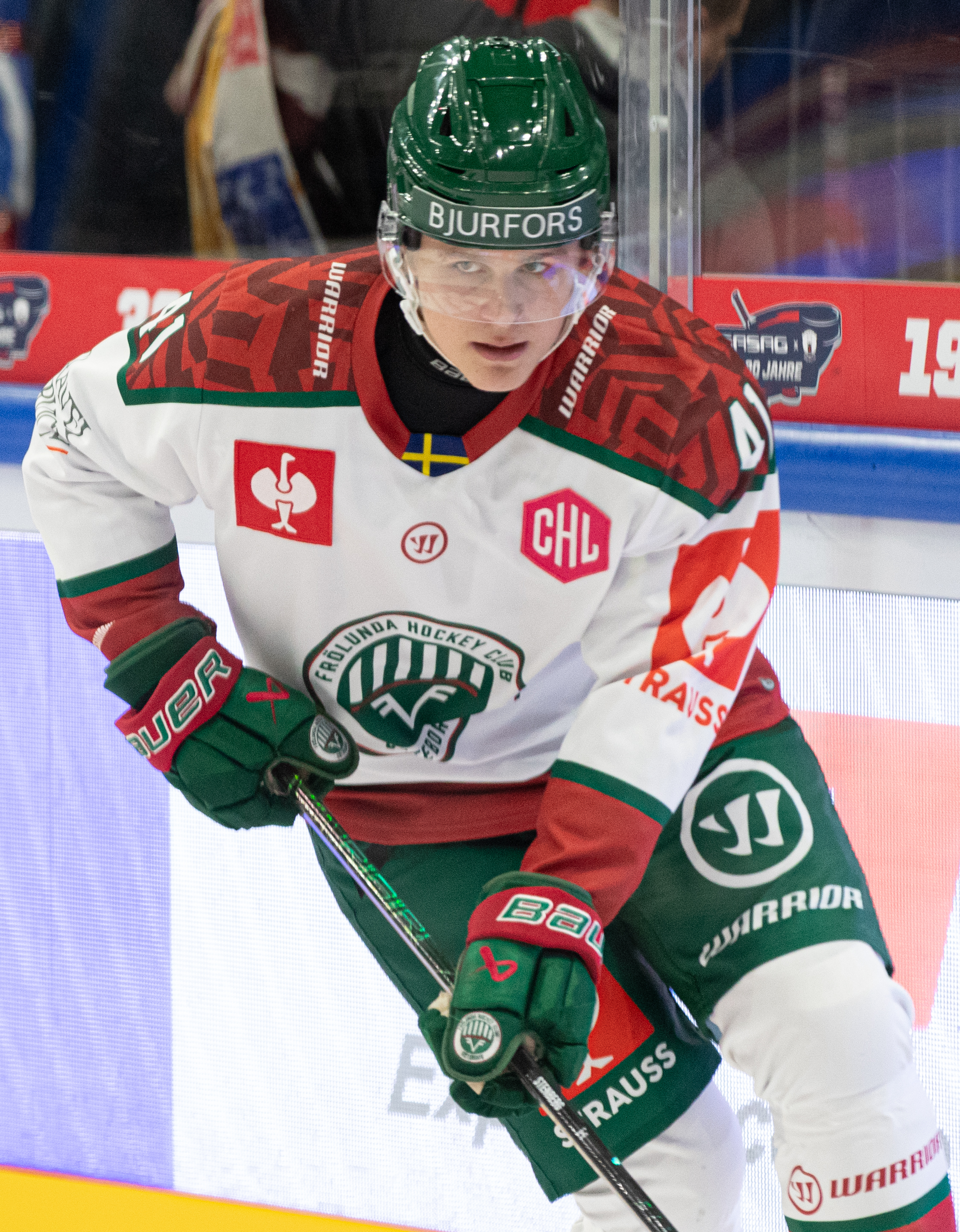
Ivar Stenberg was selected 2nd overall by the San Jose Sharks.

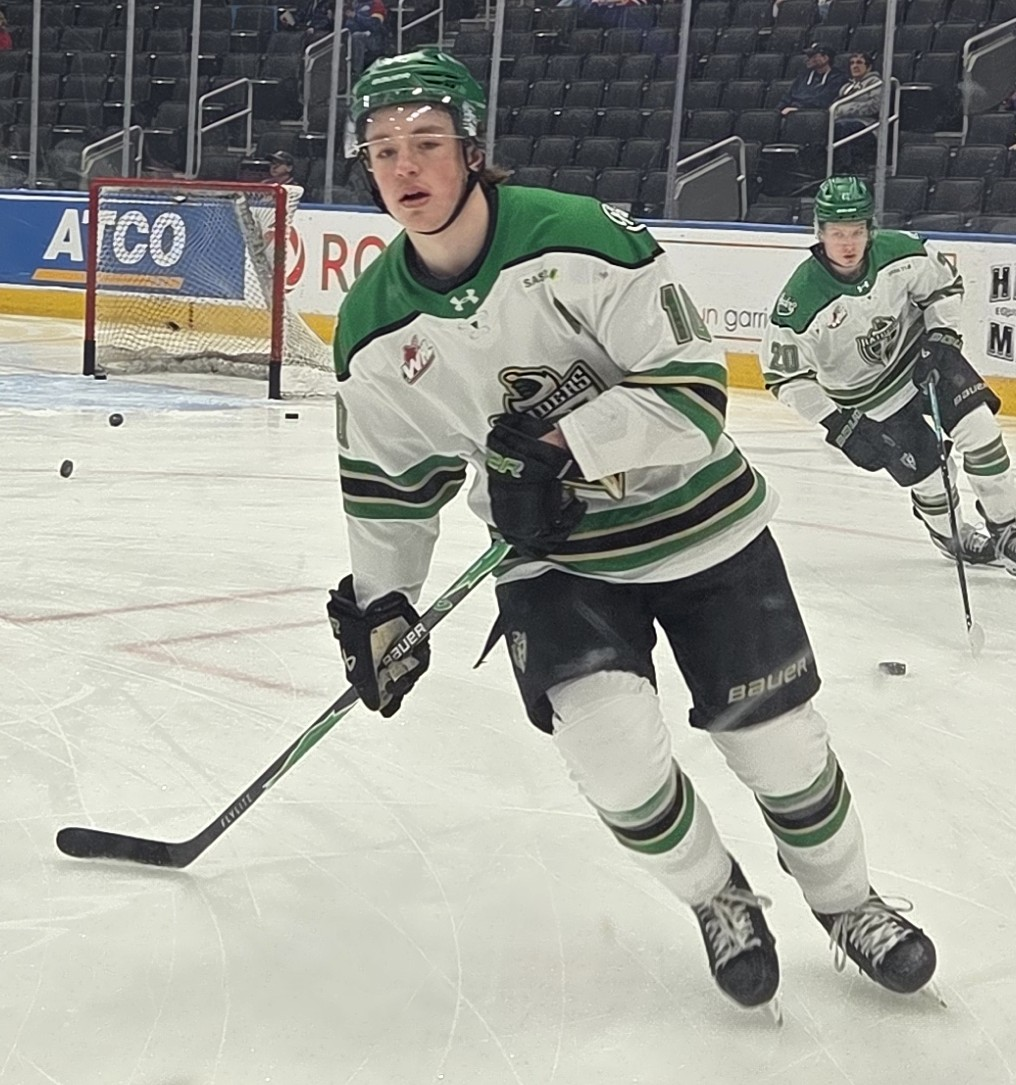
Daxon Rudolph was selected 4th overall by the Buffalo Sabres.

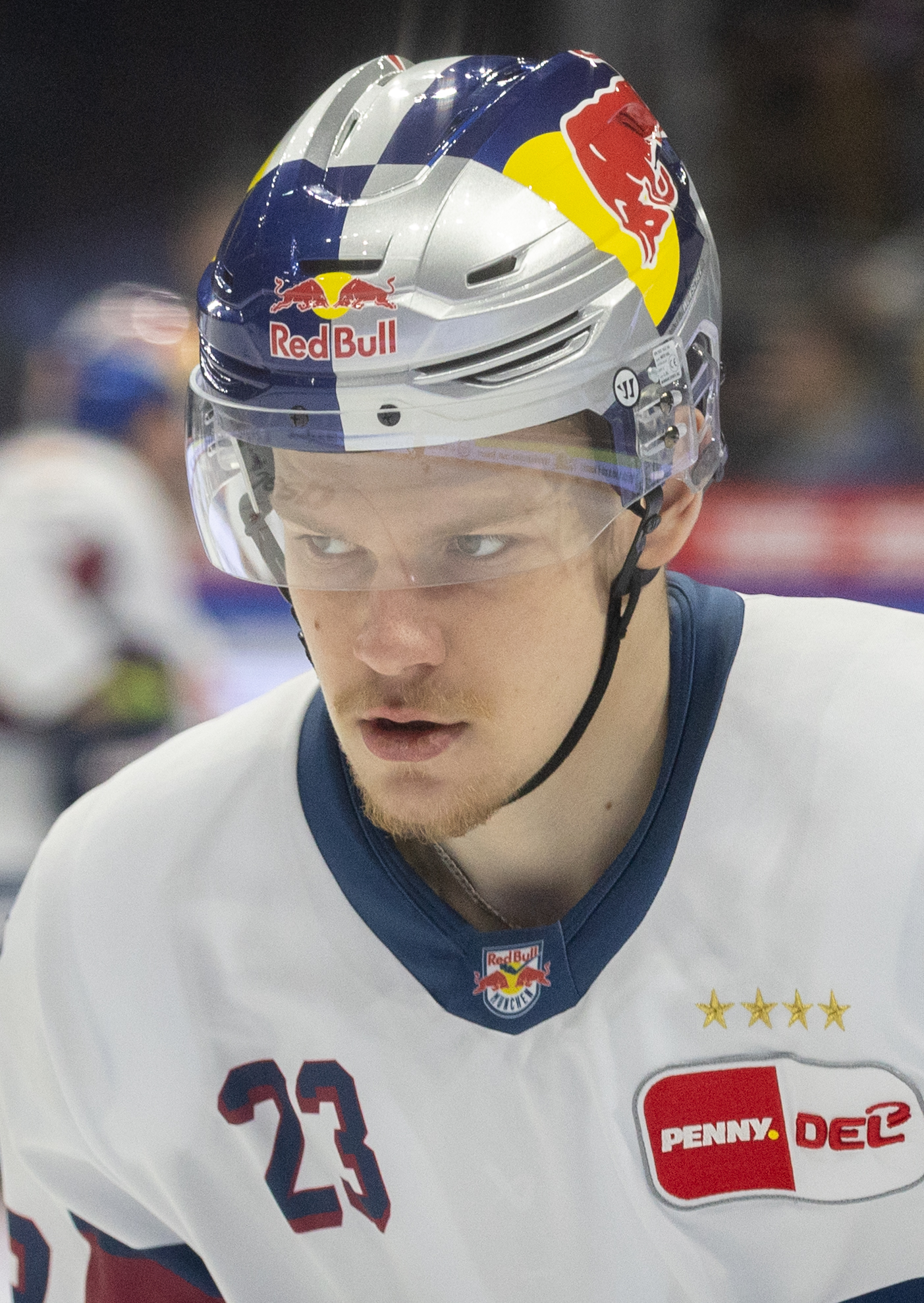
Alberts Smits was selected 5th overall by the New York Rangers.

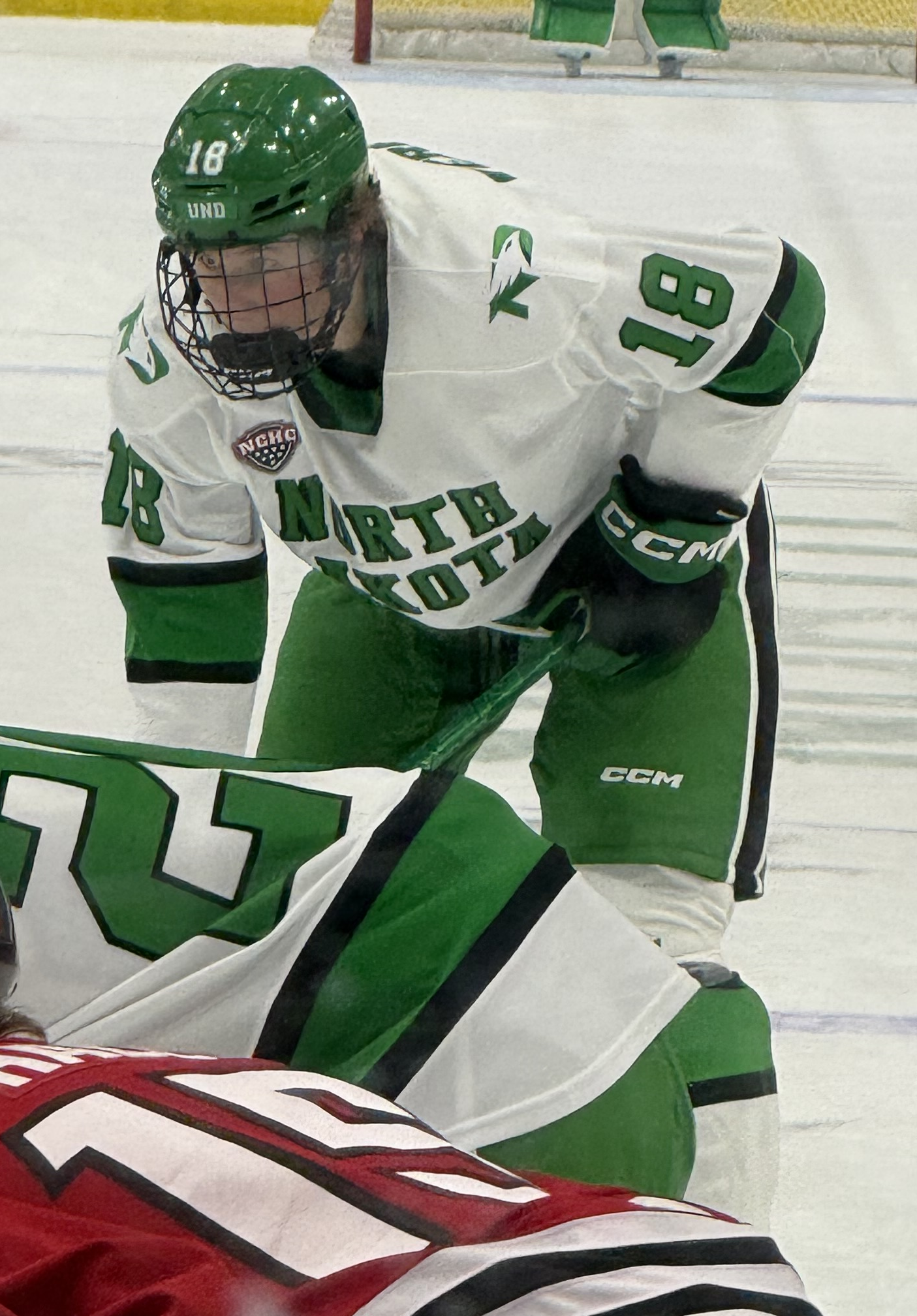
Keaton Verhoeff was selected 9th overall by the San Jose Sharks.

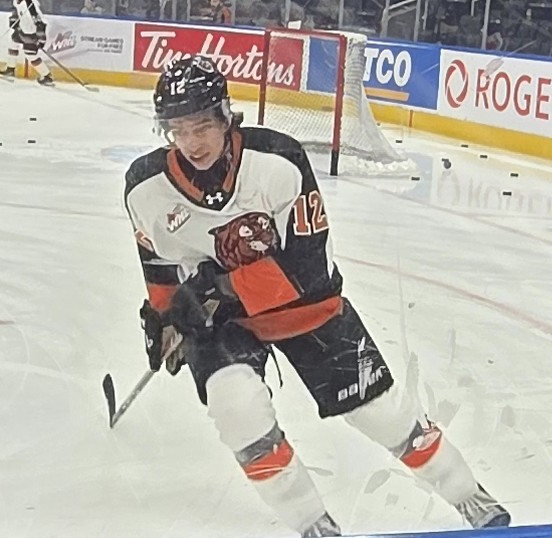
Liam Ruck was selected 22nd overall by the Pittsburgh Penguins.

#	Player	Nationality	NHL team	College/junior/club team
1	Gavin McKenna (LW)	Canada	Toronto Maple Leafs	Penn State Nittany Lions (B1G)
2	Ivar Stenberg (LW)	Sweden	San Jose Sharks	Frölunda HC (SHL)
3	Caleb Malhotra (C)	Canada	Vancouver Canucks	Brantford Bulldogs (OHL)
4	Daxon Rudolph (D)	Canada	Buffalo Sabres (from Chicago^{1})	Prince Albert Raiders (WHL)
5	Alberts Smits (D)	Latvia	New York Rangers	EHC Red Bull Munchen (DEL)
6	Carson Carels (D)	Canada	Calgary Flames	Prince George Cougars (WHL)
7	Chase Reid (D)	United States	Seattle Kraken	Sault Ste. Marie Greyhounds (OHL)
8	Viggo Bjorck (C)	Sweden	Winnipeg Jets	Djurgårdens IF (SHL)
9	Keaton Verhoeff (D)	Canada	San Jose Sharks (from Florida via Ottawa^{2})	North Dakota Fighting Hawks (NCHC)
10	Wyatt Cullen (LW)	United States	Nashville Predators	U.S. NTDP (USHL)
11	Tynan Lawrence (C)	Canada	St. Louis Blues	Boston University Terriers (HEA)
12	Alexander Command (C)	Sweden	New Jersey Devils	Orebro HK (SHL)
13	Malte Gustafsson (D)	Sweden	New York Islanders	HV71 (SHL)
14	Oscar Hemming (LW)	Finland	Columbus Blue Jackets	Boston College Eagles (ECAC)
15	Nikita Klepov (RW)	United States	Anaheim Ducks (from Detroit via St. Louis^{3})	Saginaw Spirit (OHL)
16	Maddox Dagenais (C)	Canada	St. Louis Blues (from Washington^{4})	Quebec Remparts (QMJHL)
17	Ethan Belchetz (LW)	Canada	Utah Mammoth (from Los Angeles^{5})	Windsor Spitfires (OHL)
18	Oliver Suvanto (C)	Finland	Washington Capitals (from Anaheim^{6})	Tappara (Liiga)
19	Elton Hermansson (RW)	Sweden	Los Angeles Kings (from Utah^{7})	Modo Hockey (HockeyAllsvenskan)
20	Ilia Morozov (C)	Russia	Buffalo Sabres (from Edmonton via San Jose^{8})	Miami RedHawks (NCHC)
21	Ryan Lin (D)	Canada	San Jose Sharks (from Philadelphia^{9})	Vancouver Giants (WHL)
22	Liam Ruck (RW)	Canada	Pittsburgh Penguins	Medicine Hat Tigers (WHL)
23	JP Hurlbert (LW)	United States	Detroit Red Wings (from Boston via Utah^{10})	Kamloops Blazers (WHL)
24	Adam Novotny (LW)	Czech Republic	Vancouver Canucks (from Minnesota^{11})	Peterborough Petes (OHL)
25	Jonas Lagerberg Hoen (RW)	Sweden	Ottawa Senators (from Tampa Bay via Seattle and Florida^{12})	Leksands IF (SHL)
26	Gleb Pugachyov (RW)	Russia	Montreal Canadiens (from Dallas via Carolina, NY Rangers and Vegas^{13})	Torpedo Nizhny Novgorod (KHL)
27	Maksim Sokolovskii (D)	Kazakhstan	Philadelphia Flyers (from Buffalo via San Jose^{14})	London Knights (OHL)
28	Marcus Nordmark (LW)	Sweden	Anaheim Ducks (via Montreal and Vegas^{15})	Djurgårdens IF (SHL)
29	Juho Piiparinen (D)	Finland	Vegas Golden Knights (from Colorado via NY Islanders, St. Louis and Anaheim^{16})	Tappara (Liiga)
30	Jack Hextall (C)	United States	Calgary Flames (from Vegas^{17})	Youngstown Phantoms (USHL)
31	Tommy Bleyl (D)	United States	Nashville Predators (from Carolina^{18})	Moncton Wildcats (QMJHL)
32	Jaxon Cover (LW)	Cayman Islands	Ottawa Senators^{19}	London Knights (OHL)

1. The Chicago Blackhawks' first-round pick went to the Buffalo Sabres as the result of a trade on June 23, 2026, that sent Bowen Byram and Jordan Greenway to Chicago in exchange for Louis Crevier, the New York Islanders second-round pick in 2026, and this pick.
2. The Florida Panthers' first round pick went to the San Jose Sharks as the result of a trade on June 23, 2026 that sent William Eklund, Kasper Halttunen, and Brandon Svoboda to Ottawa in exchange for this pick.
  Ottawa previously acquired this pick as the result of a trade on June 21, 2026 that sent Brady Tkachuk to Florida in exchange for the Tampa Bay Lightning's first round pick in 2026, a conditional first-round pick in 2029, a second-round pick in 2027 and this pick.
3. The Detroit Red Wings' first-round pick went to the Anaheim Ducks as the result of a trade on June 26, 2026 that sent Mason McTavish to St. Louis in exchange for a first-round pick in 2026 (29th overall) and this pick.
  St. Louis previously acquired this pick as the result of a trade on March 6, 2026, that sent Justin Faulk to Detroit in exchange for Justin Holl, Dmitri Buchelnikov, a third-round pick in 2026 and this pick.
4. The Washington Capitals' first-round pick went to the St. Louis Blues as the result of a trade on June 23, 2026, that sent Jordan Kyrou to Washington in exchange for Connor McMichael, Milton Gästrin and this pick.
5. The Los Angeles Kings' first-round pick went to the Utah Mammoth as a result of a trade on June 26, 2026, that sent a first-round pick in 2026 (19th overall) and third-round pick in 2026 (83rd overall) to Los Angeles in exchange for this pick.
6. The Anaheim Ducks' first-round pick went to the Washington Capitals as the result of a trade on March 6, 2026, that sent John Carlson to Anaheim in exchange for a third-round pick in 2027 and this pick (being conditional at the time of the trade). The condition – Washington will receive Anaheim's first-round pick in 2026 if Anaheim qualifies for the 2026 Stanley Cup playoffs – was converted on April 13, 2026.
7. The Utah Mammoth's first-round pick went to the Los Angeles Kings as a result of a trade on June 26, 2026, that sent a first-round pick 2026 (17th overall) to Utah in exchange for a third-round pick in 2026 (83rd overall) and this pick.
8. The Edmonton Oilers' first-round pick went to the Buffalo Sabres as the result of a trade on June 17, 2026, that sent Michael Kesselring and a first-round pick in 2026 (27th overall) to the San Jose Sharks in exchange for this pick.
  San Jose previously acquired this pick as the result of a trade on March 6, 2025, that sent Jake Walman to Edmonton in exchange for Carl Berglund and this pick (being conditional at the time of the trade). The condition – San Jose will receive a first-round pick in 2026 if Edmonton does not possess their first-round pick in 2027 after the 2026 trade deadline – was converted when Edmonton traded their 2027 first-round pick on March 4, 2026.
9. The Philadelphia Flyers' first-round pick went to the San Jose Sharks as the result of the trade on June 26, 2026 that sent a first-round pick in 2026 (27th overall), second-round pick in 2026 (62nd overall) and fourth-round pick in 2026 (120th overall) to Philadelphia in exchange for this pick.
10. The Boston Bruins' first-round pick went to the Detroit Red Wings as the result of the trade on June 26, 2026, that sent Sebastian Cossa to Utah in exchange for this pick.
  Utah previously acquired this pick as the result of the trade on June 26, 2026, that sent JJ Peterka to Boston in exchange for Florida's conditional first-round pick in 2028 and this pick.
11. The Minnesota Wild's first-round pick went to the Vancouver Canucks as the result of a trade on December 12, 2025, that sent Quinn Hughes to Minnesota in exchange for Marco Rossi, Liam Ohgren, Zeev Buium, and this pick.
12. The Tampa Bay Lightning's first-round pick went to the Ottawa Senators as the result of a trade on June 21, 2026, that sent Brady Tkachuk to Florida in exchange for Florida's first-round pick in 2026, a conditional first-round pick in 2029, a second-round pick in 2027 and this pick.
  Florida previously acquired this pick as the result of a trade on June 21, 2026, that sent Mackie Samoskevich to Seattle in exchange for a conditional second-round pick in 2027 and this pick.
  Seattle previously acquired this pick as the result of a trade on March 5, 2025, that sent Kyle Aucoin, Oliver Bjorkstrand and a fifth-round pick in 2026 to Tampa Bay in exchange for Mikey Eyssimont, a conditional first-round pick in 2027, Toronto's second-round pick in 2025, and this pick (being conditional at the time of the trade). The condition – Seattle will receive Tampa Bay's first-round pick in 2026 if it is outside of the top ten selections – was converted when Tampa Bay qualified for the 2026 Stanley Cup playoffs on April 4, 2026.
13. The Dallas Stars' first-round pick went to the Montreal Canadiens as the result of a trade on June 26, 2026 that sent a first-round pick in 2026 (28th overall) and third-round pick in 2027 in exchange for this pick.
  Vegas previously acquired this pick as the result of a trade on June 26, 2026 that sent Pavel Dorofeyev to New York in exchange for a third-round pick in 2026, a conditional first-round pick in 2028, and this pick.
  The New York Rangers previously acquired this pick as the result of a trade on July 1, 2025 that sent K'Andre Miller to Carolina in exchange for Scott Morrow, a second-round pick in 2026, and this pick (being conditional at the time of the trade). The condition – New York will receive Dallas' first-round pick in 2026 if it is outside of the top ten selections, and more favorable than Carolina's first round selection – was converted when Dallas qualified for the 2026 Stanley Cup playoffs on March 22, 2026 and on May 1, 2026, when they were eliminated from the 2026 Stanley Cup playoffs.
  Carolina previously acquired this pick as the result of a trade on March 7, 2025, that sent Mikko Rantanen to Dallas in exchange for Logan Stankoven, a conditional first-round pick in 2028, third-round picks in 2026 and 2027 and this pick (being conditional at the time of the trade). The condition – Carolina will receive Dallas' first-round pick in 2026 if it is outside of the top ten selections – was converted when Dallas qualified for the 2026 Stanley Cup playoffs on March 22, 2026.
14. The Buffalo Sabres's first-round pick went to the Philadelphia Flyers as the result of a trade on June 26, 2026 that sent a first-round pick in 2026 (21st overall) to San Jose in exchange for a second-round pick in 2026 (62nd overall) and fourth-round pick in 2026 (120th overall) and this pick.
  San Jose previously acquired this pick as the result of a trade on June 17, 2026 that sent a first-round pick in 2026 (20th overall) to the Sabres in exchange for Michael Kesselring and this pick.
15. The Montreal Canadiens' first-round pick went to the Anaheim Ducks as the result of a trade on June 26, 2026 that sent a first-round pick in 2026 (29th overall) and a fourth-round pick in 2026 (117th overall) to Vegas in exchange for this pick.
  Vegas previously acquired this pick as the result of a trade on June 26, 2026 that sent a first-round pick in 2026 (26th overall) to Montreal in exchange for a third-round pick in 2027 and this pick.
16. The Colorado Avalanche's first-round pick went to the Vegas Golden Knights as the result of a trade on June 26, 2026 that sent a first-round pick in 2026 (28th overall) to Anaheim in exchange for a fourth-round pick in 2026 (117th overall) and this pick.
  Anaheim previously acquired this pick as the result of a trade on June 26, 2026 that sent Mason McTavish to St. Louis in exchange for a first-round pick in 2026 (15th overall) and this pick.
  St. Louis previously acquired this pick as the result of a trade on March 6, 2026, that sent Brayden Schenn to the Islanders in exchange for Jonathan Drouin, Marcus Gidlof, a third-round pick in 2026 and this pick (being conditional at the time of the trade). The condition – St. Louis will receive Colorado's first-round pick in 2026 if it is outside of the top ten selections – was converted when Colorado qualified for the 2026 Stanley Cup playoffs on March 20, 2026.
  New York previously acquired this pick as the result of a trade on March 6, 2025, that sent William Dufour and Brock Nelson to Colorado in exchange for Oliver Kylington, Calum Ritchie, a conditional third-round pick in 2028 and this conditional pick.
17. The Vegas Golden Knights' first-round pick went to the Calgary Flames as the result of a trade on March 6, 2024, that sent Mikhail Vorobyev to Vegas in exchange for Daniil Miromanov, a conditional third-round pick in 2025 and this pick (being conditional at the time of the trade). The condition – Calgary will receive a first-round pick in 2026 if Vegas does not possess their first-round pick in 2025 by March 10, 2024 – was converted when Vegas transferred their first-round pick in 2025 to San Jose on March 8, 2024.
18. The Carolina Hurricanes' first-round pick went to the Nashville Predators as the result of a trade on June 26, 2026 that sent two second-round picks in 2026 (42nd and 57th overall) to Carolina in exchange for this pick.
19. The Ottawa Senators picked last in the first round, pick #32, as the result of a penalty sanction due to the trade of Evgenii Dadonov to the Vegas Golden Knights, and Dadonov's subsequent voided trade to the Anaheim Ducks. The pick was originally forfeited, prior to the sanction being modified on March 12, 2026. One condition of the pick reinstatement is that the Senators were not allowed to trade the pick.

=== Round two ===
Victor Plante was selected 47th overall by the Detroit Red Wings.

#	Player	Nationality	NHL team	College/junior/club team
33	Brooks Rogowski (C)	United States	Vancouver Canucks	Oshawa Generals (OHL)
34	Xavier Villeneuve (D)	Canada	Chicago Blackhawks	Blainville-Boisbriand Armada (QMJHL)
35	Ryan Roobroeck (C)	Canada	Chicago Blackhawks (from NY Rangers via Utah, Calgary and New Jersey^{1})	Niagara Ice Dogs (OHL)
36	Chase Harrington (RW)	Canada	Calgary Flames	Spokane Chiefs (WHL)
37	Matias Vanhanen (LW)	Finland	New Jersey Devils (from Toronto via Chicago^{2})	Everett Silvertips (WHL)
38	Casey Mutryn (RW)	United States	Seattle Kraken	U.S. NTDP (USHL)
39	Markus Ruck (C)	Canada	Pittsburgh Penguins (from Winnipeg^{3})	Medicine Hat Tigers (WHL)
40	Simas Ignatavicius (RW)	Lithuania	Florida Panthers	Geneve-Servette HC (NL)
41	Niklas Aaram-Olsen (RW)	Norway	Vancouver Canucks (from San Jose^{4})	Orebro HK (SHL)
42	Tobias Trejbal (G)	Czech Republic	Calgary Flames (from Nashville via Carolina^{5})	Youngstown Phantoms (USHL)
43	Egor Shilov (C)	Russia	Colorado Avalanche (from St. Louis via Pittsburgh and Columbus^{6})	Victoriaville Tigres (QMJHL)
44	Nikita Shcherbakov (D)	Russia	New Jersey Devils	Salavat Yulaev Ufa (KHL)
45	Jayden Kurtz (D)	United States	Anaheim Ducks (from NY Islanders via Chicago and Buffalo^{7})	Rogers Royals (USHS-MN)
46	Liam Lefebvre (C)	Canada	Los Angeles Kings (from Columbus via Montreal^{8})	Chicoutimi Saguenéens (QMJHL)
47	Victor Plante (LW)	United States	Detroit Red Wings	U.S. NTDP (USHL)
48	Ryder Cali (LW)	Canada	Florida Panthers (from Washington^{9})	North Bay Battalion (OHL)
49	Adam Goljer (D)	Slovakia	Los Angeles Kings	HK Dukla Trencin (Slovak Extraliga)
50	Mathis Preston (RW)	Canada	Anaheim Ducks	Vancouver Giants (WHL)
51	William Hakansson (D)	Sweden	Carolina Hurricanes (from Utah via Calgary^{10})	Lulea HF (SHL)
52	Oleg Kulebyakin (LW)	Russia	Tampa Bay Lightning (from Edmonton^{11})	Halifax Mooseheads (QMJHL)
53	Brek Liske (D)	Canada	Philadelphia Flyers	Everett Silvertips (WHL)
54	Tomas Galvas (D)	Czech Republic	Pittsburgh Penguins	Bílí Tygři Liberec (Czech Extraliga)
55	Alan Shaikhlislamov (D)	Russia	Calgary Flames (from Ottawa via Utah^{12})	Tolpar Ufa (MHL)
56	Yuri Ivanov (G)	Russia	Boston Bruins	JHC Spartak (MHL)
57	Timofei Runtso (D)	United States	Montreal Canadiens (from Carolina via Nashville and Minnesota^{13})	Victoria Royals (WHL)
58	Rudolfs Berzkalns (C)	Latvia	Edmonton Oilers (from Tampa Bay^{14})	Muskegon Lumberjacks (USHL)
59	Jakub Vanecek (D)	Czech Republic	Dallas Stars	Tri-City Americans (WHL)
60	Alexander Bilecki (D)	Canada	Toronto Maple Leafs (from Buffalo via Ottawa and Los Angeles^{15})	Kitchener Rangers (OHL)
61	Wiggo Sorensson (D)	Sweden	Carolina Hurricanes (from Montreal^{16})	Boro/Vetlanda HC (HockeyEttan)
62	Martin Psohlavec (G)	Czech Republic	Philadelphia Flyers (from Colorado via San Jose^{17})	HC Energie Karlovy Vary (Czech Extraliga)
~~63~~	Forfeited pick^{18}		~~Vegas Golden Knights~~	
64	Ben Macbeath (D)	Canada	New York Rangers (from Carolina^{19})	Calgary Hitmen (WHL)

1. The New York Rangers' second-round pick went to the Chicago Blackhawks as the result of a trade on June 27, 2026, that sent Toronto's second-round pick in 2026 (37th overall) and Ottawa's fourth-round pick in 2026 (119th overall) to New Jersey in exchange for this pick.
  New Jersey previously acquired this pick as the result of a trade on June 23, 2026, that sent Simon Nemec and Maxim Tsyplakov to Calgary in exchange for Etienne Morin, Vegas' conditional 2027 or 2028 first-round pick, Colorado's conditional 2028 or 2029 first-round pick, and this pick.
  Calgary previously acquired this pick as the result of a trade on March 4, 2026, that sent MacKenzie Weegar to Utah in exchange for Olli Määttä, Jonathan Castagna, a second-round pick in 2026, Ottawa's second round-pick in 2026 and this pick.
  Utah previously acquired this pick as the result of a trade on July 13, 2022, that sent Ty Emberson to New York in exchange for Patrik Nemeth, a second-round pick in 2025 and this pick (being conditional at the time of the trade). The condition – Arizona (Note: As per their April 2024 agreement, all draft rights held by the Arizona Coyotes were transferred to the Utah Mammoth.) will receive a third-round pick in 2024 or a second-round pick in 2026, at their choice – was converted when the Rangers' third-round pick in 2024 was transferred to St. Louis on March 27, 2023.
2. The Toronto Maple Leafs' second-round pick went to the New Jersey Devils as the result of a trade on June 27, 2026, that sent the New York Rangers' 2026 second-round pick (35th overall) to Chicago in exchange for Ottawa's 2026 fourth-round pick (119th overall) and this pick.
  Chicago previously acquired this pick as the result of a trade on February 27, 2023, that sent Sam Lafferty, Jake McCabe, a conditional fifth-round pick in 2024 and a conditional fifth-round pick in 2025 to Toronto in exchange for Joey Anderson, Pavel Gogolev, a conditional first-round pick in 2025 and this pick.
3. The Winnipeg Jets' second-round pick went to the Pittsburgh Penguins as a result of a trade on March 7, 2025 that sent Luke Schenn to Winnipeg in exchange for a fourth-round pick in 2027 and this pick.
4. The San Jose Sharks' second-round pick went to the Vancouver Canucks as the result of a trade on January 19, 2026, that sent Kiefer Sherwood to San Jose in exchange for Cole Clayton, a second-round pick in 2027 and this pick.
5. The Nashville Predators' second-round pick went to the Calgary Flames as the result of a trade on June 27, 2026, that sent Utah's 2026 second-round pick (51st overall) and a 2026 third-round pick (67th overall) to Carolina in exchange for this pick.
  Carolina previously acquired this pick as the result of a trade on June 26, 2026, that sent a 2026 first-round pick (31st overall) to Nashville for Minnesota's 2026 second round pick (57th overall) and this pick.
6. The St. Louis Blues' second-round pick went to the Colorado Avalanche as the result of a trade on June 25, 2026, that sent Valeri Nichushkin to Columbus in exchange for a third-round pick in 2027, a fifth-round pick in 2028 and this pick.
  Columbus previously acquired this pick as the result of a trade on December 29, 2025, that sent Egor Chinakhov to Pittsburgh in exchange for Danton Heinen, a third-round pick in 2027 and this pick.
  Pittsburgh previously acquired this pick as the result of a trade on August 13, 2024, that sent St. Louis' second-round pick in 2025 and a fifth-round pick in 2026 to St. Louis in exchange for Ottawa's third-round pick in 2025 and this pick.
7. The New York Islanders' second-round pick went to the Anaheim Ducks as the result of a trade on June 26, 2026, that sent Olen Zellweger to Buffalo in exchange for Anton Wahlberg and this pick.
  Buffalo previously acquired this pick as the result of a trade on June 23, 2026, that sent Bowen Byram and Jordan Greenway to Chicago in exchange for Louis Crevier, Chicago's first-round pick in 2026, and this pick.
  Chicago previously acquired this pick as the result of a trade on June 29, 2023, that sent future considerations to New York in exchange for Josh Bailey and this pick.
8. The Columbus Blue Jackets' second-round pick went to the Los Angeles Kings as the result of a trade on December 19, 2025, that sent Phillip Danault to Montreal in exchange for this pick.
  Montreal previously acquired this pick as the result of a trade on August 19, 2024, that sent Jordan Harris to Columbus in exchange for Patrik Laine and this pick.
9. The Washington Capitals' second-round pick went to the Florida Panthers as the result of a trade on June 26, 2025, that sent Justin Sourdif to Washington in exchange for a sixth-round pick in 2027 and this pick.
10. The Utah Mammoth's second-round pick went to the Carolina Hurricanes as the result of a trade on June 27, 2026, that traded Nashville's 2026 second-round pick (42nd overall) to Calgary in exchange for a 2026 third-round pick (67th overall) and this pick.
  Calgary previously acquired this pick as the result of a trade on March 4, 2026, that sent MacKenzie Weegar to Utah in exchange for Olli Määttä, Jonathan Castagna, the Rangers' second-round pick in 2026, Ottawa's second-round pick in 2026 and this pick.
11. The Edmonton Oilers' second-round pick went to the Tampa Bay Lightning as the result of a trade on June 27, 2026, that sent a 2026 second-round pick (58th overall) and Toronto's 2026 fifth round pick (133rd overall) to Edmonton in exchange for this pick.
12. The Ottawa Senators' second-round pick went to the Calgary Flames as the result of a trade on March 4, 2026, that sent MacKenzie Weegar to Utah in exchange for Olli Määttä, Jonathan Castagna, a second-round pick in 2026, the Rangers' second-round pick in 2026 and this pick.
  Utah previously acquired this pick as the result of a trade on March 1, 2023, that sent Jakob Chychrun to Ottawa in exchange for a conditional first-round pick in 2023, a conditional second-round pick in 2024 and this pick.
13. The Minnesota Wild's second-round pick went to the Montreal Canadiens as the result of a trade on June 27, 2026, that sent a 2026 second-round pick (61st overall) and 2026 fourth-round pick (125th overall) to Carolina in exchange for this pick.
  Carolina previously acquired this pick as the result of a trade on June 26, 2026, that sent a 2026 first-round pick (31st overall) to Nashville in exchange for a 2026 second-round pick (42nd overall) and this pick.
  Nashville previously acquired this pick as the result of a trade on March 1, 2025, that sent Gustav Nyquist to Minnesota in exchange for this pick.
14. The Tampa Bay Lightning's second-round pick went to the Edmonton Oilers as the result of a trade on June 27, 2026, that sent a 2026 second-round pick (52nd overall) to Tampa Bay in exchange for Toronto's 2026 firth-round pick (132nd overall) and this pick.
15. The Buffalo Sabres' second-round pick went to the Toronto Maple Leafs as the result of a trade on March 6, 2026, that sent Scott Laughton to Los Angeles in exchange for this pick (being conditional at the time of the trade). The condition – Toronto will receive Buffalo's second-round pick in 2026 if Los Angeles qualifies for the 2026 Stanley Cup playoffs – was converted on April 13, 2026.
  Los Angeles previously acquired this pick as the result of a trade on March 5, 2026, that sent Warren Foegele and a conditional third-round pick in 2026 to Ottawa in exchange for a conditional third-round pick in 2026 and this pick.
  Ottawa previously acquired this pick as the result of a trade on March 7, 2025, that sent Jacob Bernard-Docker and Josh Norris to Buffalo in exchange for Dylan Cozens, Dennis Gilbert, and this pick.
16. The Montreal Canadiens' second-round pick went to the Carolina Hurricanes as the result of a trade on June 27, 2026, that sent Minnesota's 2026 second-round pick (57th overall) to Montreal in exchange for a 2026 fourth-round pick (124th overall) and this pick.
17. The Colorado Avalanche's second-round pick went to the Philadelphia Flyers as the result of a trade on June 26, 2026, that sent a 2026 first-round pick (21st overall) to San Jose in exchange for Buffalo's 2026 first-round pick (27th overall), Boston's 2026 fourth-round pick (120th overall), and this pick.
  San Jose previously acquired this pick as the result of a trade on December 9, 2024, that sent Mackenzie Blackwood, Givani Smith and a fifth-round pick in 2027 to Colorado in exchange for Alexandar Georgiev, Nikolai Kovalenko, a fifth-round pick in 2025 and this pick.
18. The Vegas Golden Knights' second round pick was forfeited as the result of a penalty sanction due to violations of the 2026 Stanley Cup playoffs Media Regulations. The penalty includes the forfeiture of this pick as well as a $100,000 fine towards Vegas head coach John Tortorella.
19. The Carolina Hurricanes' second-round pick went to the New York Rangers as the result of a trade on July 1, 2025, that sent K'Andre Miller to Carolina in exchange for Scott Morrow, a conditional first-round pick 2026, and this pick.

=== Round three ===
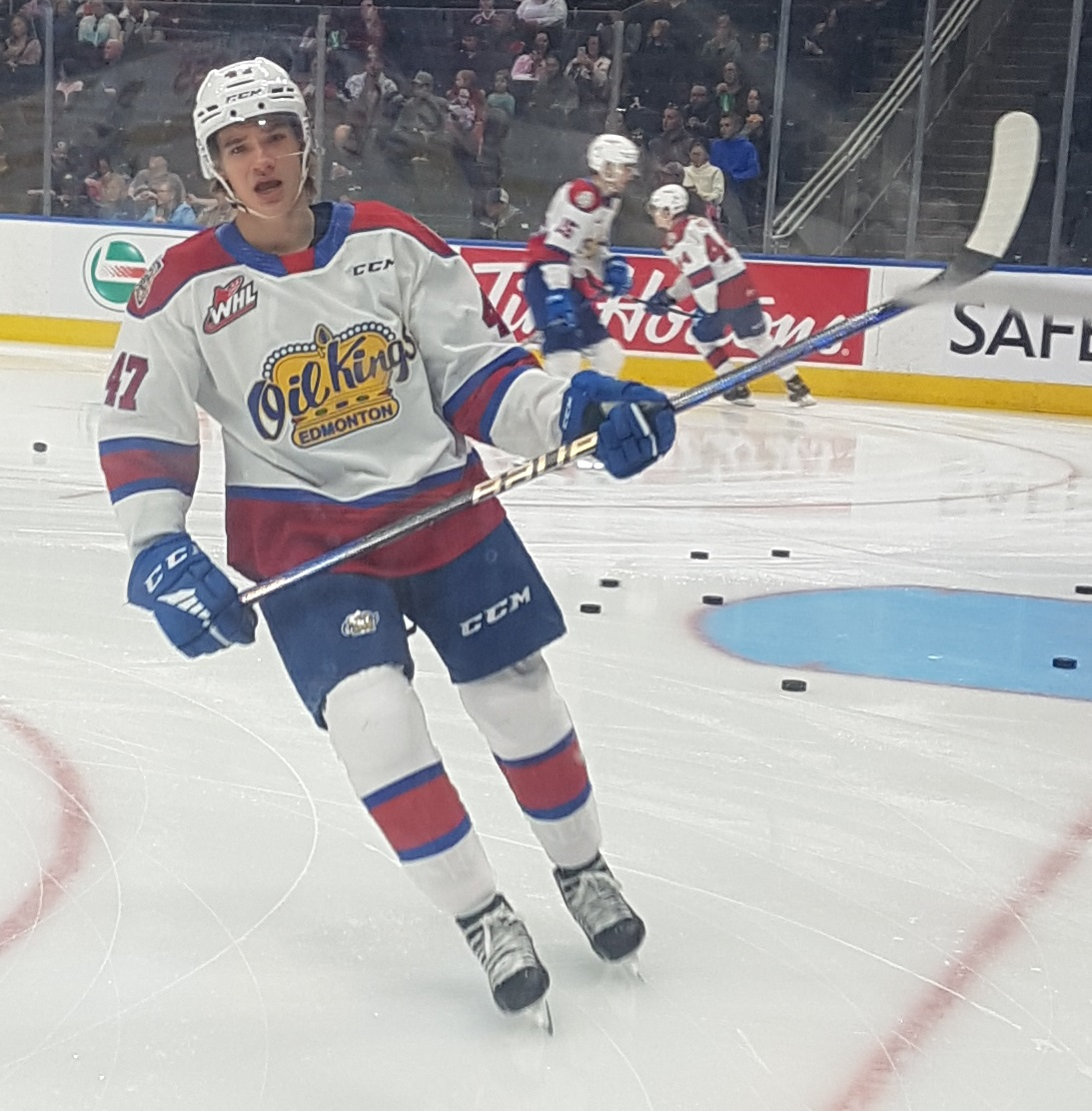
Ethan MacKenzie was selected 69th overall by the Toronto Maple Leafs.

#	Player	Nationality	NHL team	College/junior/club team
65	Joe Iginla (RW)	Canada	Calgary Flames (from Vancouver^{1})	Vancouver Giants (WHL)
66	Samu Alalauri (D)	Finland	Chicago Blackhawks	Lahti Pelicans (U20 SM-sarja)
67	Danai Shaiikov (G)	Kazakhstan	New York Rangers	Gatineau Olympiques (QMJHL)
68	Zachary Lansard (RW)	Canada	Carolina Hurricanes (from Calgary^{2})	Regina Pats (WHL)
69	Ethan MacKenzie (D)	Canada	Toronto Maple Leafs	Edmonton Oil Kings (WHL)
70	Dmitri Borichev (G)	Russia	Nashville Predators (from Seattle via Dallas^{3})	JHC Loko (MHL)
71	Samuel Hrenak (G)	Slovakia	Winnipeg Jets	Fargo Force (USHL)
72	Adam Nemec (LW)	Slovakia	Ottawa Senators (from Florida^{4})	Sudbury Wolves (OHL)
73	Zach Olsen (RW)	Canada	Toronto Maple Leafs (from San Jose via Pittsburgh, Detroit, and St. Louis^{5})	Saskatoon Blades (WHL)
74	Beckett Hamilton (C)	United States	Colorado Avalanche (from Nashville^{6})	Red Deer Rebels (WHL)
75	Luke Schairer (D)	United States	St. Louis Blues	U.S. NTDP (USHL)
76	Mans Gudmundsson (D)	Sweden	Toronto Maple Leafs (from New Jersey via NY Islanders and St. Louis^{7})	Färjestad BK (J20 Nationell)
77	Charlie Morrison (D)	Canada	New York Rangers (from NY Islanders^{8})	Quebec Remparts (QMJHL)
78	Dmitri Ivchenko (G)	Russia	Vancouver Canucks (from Columbus^{9})	Omskie Yastreby (MHL)
79	Michal Orsulak (G)	Czech Republic	Detroit Red Wings	Prince Albert Raiders (WHL)
80	Blake Zielinski (C)	United States	Los Angeles Kings (from Washington via Ottawa^{10})	Des Moines Buccaneers (USHL)
81	Tomas Chrenko (C)	Slovakia	New York Rangers (from Los Angeles^{11})	HK Nitra (Slovak Extraliga)
82	Rian Chudzinski (RW)	United States	Anaheim Ducks	Moncton Wildcats (QMJHL)
83	Adam Andersson (C)	Sweden	Minnesota Wild (from Utah via Los Angeles^{12})	Leksands IF (J20 Nationell)
84	Malcom Gastrin (LW)	Sweden	Edmonton Oilers	Modo Hockey (J20 Nationell)
85	Juuso Ainasto (G)	Finland	Toronto Maple Leafs (from Philadelphia^{13})	Jokerit (U20 SM-sarja)
86	Pierce Mbuyi (LW)	Canada	Pittsburgh Penguins	Owen Sound Attack (OHL)
87	Oscar Holmertz (C)	Sweden	Ottawa Senators	Linköping HC (J20 Nationell)
88	Nils Bartholdsson (RW)	Sweden	Boston Bruins	Rögle BK (J20 Nationell)
89	Yegor Rybkin (G)	Russia	Los Angeles Kings (from Minnesota^{14})	Chaika Nizhny Novgorod (MHL)
90	Tomas Kralovic (D)	Slovakia	Tampa Bay Lightning	HC Slovan Bratislava (Slovak Extraliga)
91	Louis-Felix Bourque (RW)	Canada	Ottawa Senators (from Dallas via Carolina and Los Angeles^{15})	Drummondville Voltigeurs (QMJHL)
92	Ben Wilmott (C)	United States	Vegas Golden Knights (from New York via Buffalo^{16})	Barrie Colts (OHL)
93	Cooper Cleaves (D)	United States	Montreal Canadiens	Dartmouth Big Green (ECAC)
94	Alessandro Di Iorio (C)	Canada	Columbus Blue Jackets (from Colorado via Minnesota^{17})	Sarnia Sting (OHL)
95	Sean Burick (D)	United States	Vegas Golden Knights	Penticton Vees (WHL)
96	Adam Valentini (C)	Canada	Utah Mammoth (from Carolina^{18})	Michigan Wolverines (B1G)

1. The Vancouver Canucks' third-round pick went to the Calgary Flames as the result of a trade on November 30, 2023, that sent Nikita Zadorov to Vancouver in exchange for a conditional fifth-round pick in 2024 and this pick.
2. The Calgary Flames' third-round pick went to the Carolina Hurricanes as the result of a trade on June 27, 2026, that sent Nashville's 2026 second-round pick (42nd overall) to Calgary in exchange for Utah's 2026 second-round pick (51st overall) and this pick.
3. The Seattle Kraken's third-round pick went to the Nashville Predators as the result of a trade on March 5, 2026, that sent Michael Bunting to Dallas in exchange for this pick.
  Dallas previously acquired this pick as the result of a trade on June 19, 2025, that sent Mason Marchment to Seattle in exchange for a fourth-round pick in 2025 and this pick.
4. The Florida Panthers' third-round pick went to the Ottawa Senators as the result of a trade on March 6, 2024, that sent Vladimir Tarasenko to Florida in exchange for a third-round pick in 2025 and this pick (being conditional at the time of the trade). The condition – Ottawa will receive a third-round pick in 2026 if Florida wins the Stanley Cup in 2024 – was converted on June 24, 2024.
5. The San Jose Sharks' third-round pick went to the Toronto Maple Leafs as the result of a trade on June 27, 2026, that sent Brandon Carlo to St. Louis in exchange for New Jersey's 2026 third-round pick (76th overall) and this pick.
  St. Louis previously acquired this pick as the result of a trade on March 6, 2026, that sent Justin Faulk to Detroit in exchange for Justin Holl, Dmitri Buchelnikov a first-round pick in 2026 and this pick.
  Detroit previously acquired this pick as the result of a trade on March 6, 2026, that sent Elmer Soderblom to Pittsburgh in exchange for this pick.
  Pittsburgh previously acquired this pick as the result of a trade on August 6, 2023, that sent Mikael Granlund, Mike Hoffman, Jan Rutta and a conditional first-round pick in 2024 to San Jose in exchange for Dillon Hamaliuk, Erik Karlsson and this pick.
6. The Nashville Predators' third-round pick went to the Colorado Avalanche as the result of a trade on June 16, 2026, that sent Ross Colton and Isak Posch to Nashville in exchange for Magnus Chrona, Colorado's own third-round pick in 2027, and this pick.
7. The New Jersey Devils' third-round pick went to the Toronto Maple Leafs as the result of a trade on June 27, 2026, that sent Brandon Carlo to St. Louis in exchange for San Jose's 2026 third-round pick (73rd overall) and this pick.
  St. Louis previously acquired this pick as the result of a trade on March 6, 2026, that sent Brayden Schenn to the Islanders in exchange for Jonathan Drouin, Marcus Gidlof, a conditional first-round pick in 2026 and this pick.
  The New York Islanders previously acquired this pick as the result of a trade on January 27, 2026, that sent Maxim Tsyplakov to New Jersey in exchange for Ondrej Palat, a sixth-round pick in 2027, and this pick.
8. The New York Islanders' third-round pick went to the New York Rangers as the result of a trade on January 26, 2026, that sent Carson Soucy to the Islanders in exchange for this pick.
9. The Columbus Blue Jackets' third-round pick went to the Vancouver Canucks as the result of a trade on March 5, 2026, that sent Conor Garland to Columbus in exchange for a second-round pick in 2028 and this pick.
10. The Washington Capitals' third-round pick went to the Los Angeles Kings as the result of a trade on March 5, 2026, that sent Warren Foegele and a conditional third-round pick in 2026 to Ottawa in exchange for a second-round pick in 2026 and this pick (being conditional at the time of the trade). The condition – Los Angeles will receive the better of Ottawa or Washington's third-round picks in 2026 – was converted on April 13, 2026, when Washington was eliminated from playoff contention after Ottawa had already qualified for the 2026 Stanley Cup playoffs.
  Ottawa previously acquired this pick as the result of a trade on July 1, 2024, that sent Jakob Chychrun to Washington in exchange for Nick Jensen and this pick.
11. The Los Angeles Kings' third-round pick went to the New York Rangers as the result of a trade on February 4, 2026, that sent Artemi Panarin to Los Angeles in exchange for Liam Greentree, a conditional fourth-round pick in 2028 and this pick (being conditional at the time of the trade. The condition – New York will receive the better of Dallas or Los Angeles' third-round picks in 2026 if Los Angeles does not win one round in the 2026 Stanley Cup playoffs – was converted on April 26, 2026, when Los Angeles was eliminated in the first round of the 2026 Stanley Cup playoffs, ensuring their pick would be higher than Dallas'.
12. The Utah Mammoth's third-round pick went to the Minnesota Wild as the result of a trade on June 27, 2026, that sent a 2026 third-round pick (89th overall) and a 2026 fifth-round pick (153rd overall) to Los Angeles in exchange for this pick.
  Minnesota previously acquired this pick as the result of a trade on June 26, 2026, that sent a 2026 first-round pick (17th overall) to Utah in exchange for a 2026 first-round pick (19th overall) and this pick.
13. The Philadelphia Flyers' third-round pick went to the Toronto Maple Leafs as the result of a trade on June 16, 2026, that sent Simon Benoit and Joseph Woll to Philadelphia in exchange for Emil Andrae, Samuel Ersson, and this pick.
14. The Minnesota Wild's third-round pick went to the Los Angeles Kings as the result of a trade on June 27, 2026, that sent Utah's 2026 third-round pick (83rd overall) and a 2026 fifth-round pick (153rd overall) to Minnesota in exchange for this pick.
15. The Dallas Stars' third-round pick went to the Ottawa Senators as the result of a trade on March 5, 2026, that sent a second and conditional third-round pick in 2026 to Los Angeles in exchange for Warren Foegele and this pick (being conditional at the time of the trade). The condition – Ottawa will receive the lesser of Dallas or Los Angeles' third-round picks in 2026 – was converted on April 26, 2026 when Los Angeles was eliminated from the first round of the 2026 Stanley Cup playoffs, ensuring that Dallas' pick would be lower than Los Angeles'.
  Los Angeles previously acquired this pick as the result of a trade on June 28, 2025, that sent Nashville's third-round pick in 2025 to Carolina in exchange for a fourth-round pick in 2025 and this pick.
  Carolina previously acquired this pick as the result of a trade on March 7, 2025, that sent Mikko Rantanen to Dallas in exchange for Logan Stankoven, conditional first-round picks in 2026 and 2028, a third-round pick in 2027, and this pick.
16. The Buffalo Sabres' third-round pick went to the Vegas Golden Knights as the result of a trade on June 26, 2026 that sent Pavel Dorofeyev to the New York Rangers in exchange for Dallas' first-round pick in 2026, a conditional first-round pick in 2028, and this pick.
  New York previously acquired this pick as the result of a trade on March 6, 2026, that sent Sam Carrick to Buffalo in exchange for a sixth-round pick in 2026 and this pick.
17. The Colorado Avalanche's third-round pick went to the Columbus Blue Jackets as the result of a trade on November 30, 2024, that sent David Jiricek and a fifth-round pick in 2025 to Minnesota in exchange for Daemon Hunt, a conditional first-round pick in 2025, Toronto's fourth-round pick in 2026, a second-round pick in 2027 and this pick.
  Minnesota previously acquired this pick as the result of a trade on March 7, 2024, that sent Brandon Duhaime to Colorado in exchange for this pick.
18. The Carolina Hurricanes' third-round pick went to the Utah Mammoth as the result of a trade on March 1, 2023, that sent Shayne Gostisbehere to Carolina in exchange for this pick.

=== Round four ===
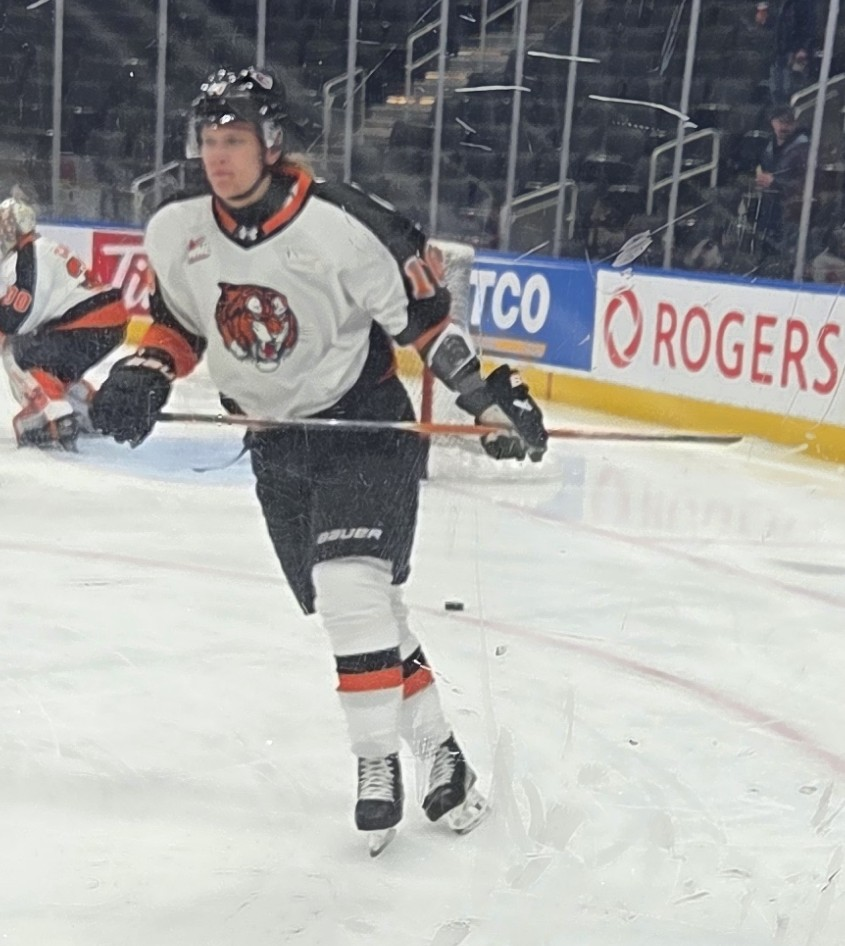
Yaroslav Bryzgalov was selected 97th overall by the Vancouver Canucks.

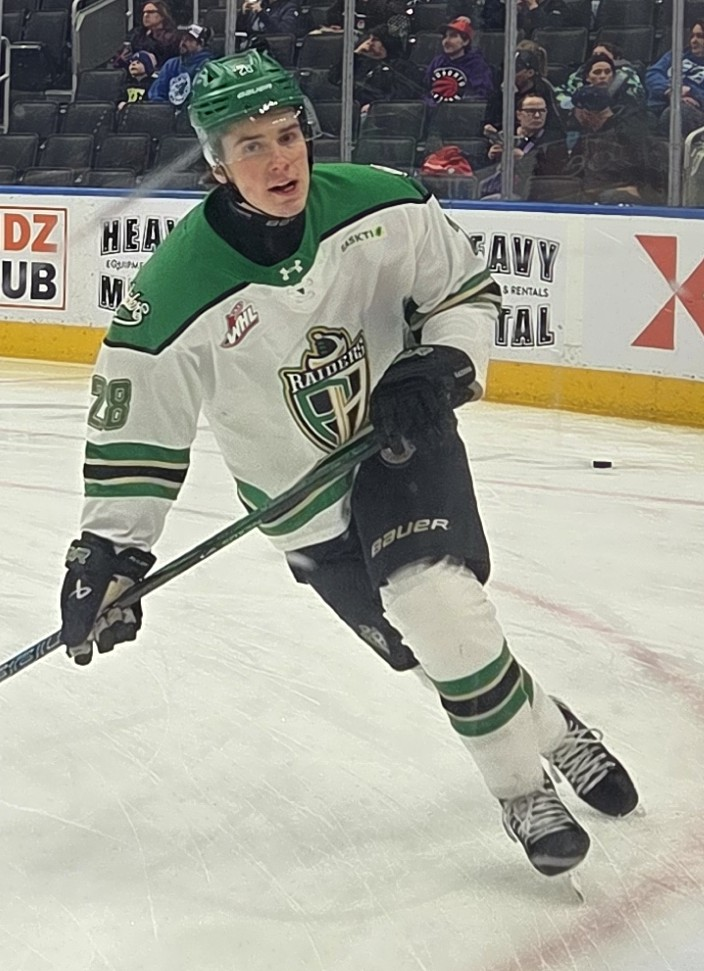
Jonah Silverston was selected 113th overall by the Vegas Golden Knights.

#	Player	Nationality	NHL team	College/junior/club team
97	Yaroslav Bryzgalov (LW)	Belarus	Vancouver Canucks	Medicine Hat Tigers (WHL)
98	Jonas Kemps (D)	United States	Florida Panthers (from Chicago^{1})	Chicago Steel (USHL)
99	Viktor Fedorov (C)	Russia	Seattle Kraken (from NY Rangers via Columbus^{2})	Torpedo Nizhny Novgorod (KHL)
100	Egor Barabanov (C)	Russia	Calgary Flames	Saginaw Spirit (OHL)
101	Tyus Sparks (C)	United States	Washington Capitals (from Toronto via Minnesota and Columbus^{3})	Spokane Chiefs (WHL)
102	Spencer Bowes (LW)	Canada	New York Rangers (from Seattle^{4})	Ottawa 67’s (OHL)
103	Thomas Vandenberg (C)	Canada	Los Angeles Kings (from Winnipeg via New Jersey and Montreal^{5})	Ottawa 67’s (OHL)
104	Matvei Kotkov (RW)	Russia	Boston Bruins (from Florida via San Jose^{6})	Loko Yaroslavl (MHL)
105	Michael Berchild (LW)	United States	Carolina Hurricanes (from San Jose^{7})	U.S. NTDP (USHL)
106	Jakub Floris (D)	Slovakia	Nashville Predators	Lukko (Liiga)
107	Landon Nycz (D)	United States	St. Louis Blues	UMass (H-East)
108	Adam Levac (C)	Canada	Detroit Red Wings (from New Jersey^{8})	Peterborough Petes (OHL)
109	Lincoln Kuehne (D)	United States	New York Islanders	Arizona State (NCHC)
110	Elliot Lennon (G)	Canada	Ottawa Senators (from Columbus via Detroit^{9})	Deerfield Big Green (HS-MA)
111	Parker Von Richter (D)	Canada	Pittsburgh Penguins (from Detroit via Anaheim and Boston^{10})	Barrie Colts (OHL)
112	Kayden Lemire (RW)	Canada	Minnesota Wild (from Washington via Columbus^{11})	Prince George Cougars (WHL)
113	Jonah Sivertson (RW)	Canada	Vegas Golden Knights (from Los Angeles via Montreal^{12})	Prince Albert Raiders (WHL)
114	Patriks Plumins (G)	Latvia	Toronto Maple Leafs (from Anaheim via Seattle^{13})	HK Zemgale/LBTU (LHHL)
115	Carl Axelsson (G)	Sweden	Utah Mammoth	Muskegon Lumberjacks (USHL)
116	Zach Wooten (LW)	United States	Winnipeg Jets (from Edmonton via Boston and Buffalo^{14})	Green Bay Gamblers (USHL)
117	Brayden Klimpke (D)	Canada	Montreal Canadiens (from Philadelphia via Anaheim and Vegas^{15})	Saskatoon Blades (WHL)
118	Justin Graf (LW)	United States	Nashville Predators (from Pittsburgh^{16})	Cedar Rapids RoughRiders (USHL)
119	Lavr Gashilov (C)	Russia	New Jersey Devils (from Ottawa via Chicago^{17})	JHC Atvo (MHL)
120	Marek Sklenicka (G)	Czech Republic	Philadelphia Flyers (from Boston via San Jose^{19})	Seattle Thunderbirds (WHL)
121	Evan Jardine (LW)	United States	Columbus Blue Jackets (from Minnesota^{19})	Youngstown Phantoms (USHL)
122	Oscar Olsson (LW)	Sweden	Boston Bruins (from Tampa Bay^{20})	Orebro HK (SHL)
123	Vladimir Proskurin (G)	Russia	St. Louis Blues (from Dallas via New Jersey^{21})	MHK Atlant Mytischi (MHL)
124	Olivers Murnieks (C)	Latvia	Buffalo Sabres	Saint John Sea Dogs (QMJHL)
125	Ryder Fetterolf (G)	United States	Carolina Hurricanes (from Montreal^{22})	Ottawa 67’s (OHL)
126	Tobias Tvrznik (G)	Czech Republic	Colorado Avalanche	Wenatchee Wild (WHL)
127	Brady Knowling (G)	United States	San Jose Sharks (from Vegas via Washington^{23})	U.S. NTDP (USHL)
128	Axel Elofsson (D)	Sweden	Colorado Avalanche (from Carolina^{24})	Orebro HK (SHL)

1. The Chicago Blackhawks' fourth-round pick went to the Florida Panthers as the result of a trade on March 1, 2025, that sent Spencer Knight and a conditional first-round pick in 2026 to Chicago in exchange for Seth Jones and this pick.
2. The New York Rangers' fourth-round pick went to the Seattle Kraken as the result of a trade on December 19, 2025, that sent Mason Marchment to Columbus in exchange for a second-round pick in 2027 and this pick.
  Columbus previously acquired this pick as the result of a trade on March 8, 2024, that sent Jack Roslovic to New York in exchange for this pick (being conditional at the time of the trade). The condition – Columbus will receive a fourth-round pick in 2026 if the Rangers do not advance to the 2024 Stanley Cup Final – was converted when the Rangers were eliminated from the 2024 Stanley Cup playoffs on June 1, 2024.
3. The Toronto Maple Leafs' fourth-round pick went to the Washington Capitals as the result of a trade on June 27, 2026, that sent a 2026 fourth-round pick (112th overall) and a 2028 fifth-round pick to Columbus in exchange for this pick.
  Columbus previously acquired this pick as the result of a trade on November 30, 2024, that sent David Jiricek and a fifth-round pick in 2025 to Minnesota in exchange for Daemon Hunt, a conditional first-round pick in 2025, Colorado's third-round pick in 2026, a second-round pick in 2027, and this pick.
  Minnesota previously acquired this pick as the result of a trade on March 8, 2024, that sent Connor Dewar to Toronto in exchange for Dmitry Ovchinnikov and this pick.
4. The Seattle Kraken's fourth-round pick went to the New York Rangers as the result of a trade on June 27, 2026, that sent two 2026 fifth-round picks (131st and 148th overall) to Seattle in exchange for this pick.
5. The Winnipeg Jets' fourth-round pick went to the Los Angeles Kings as the result of a trade on June 27, 2026, that sent a 2026 fourth-round pick (113th overall) and a 2026 sixth-round pick (190th overall) to Montreal in exchange for this pick.
  Montreal previously acquired this pick as the result of a trade on June 30, 2024, that sent Johnathan Kovacevic to New Jersey in exchange for this pick (being conditional at the time of the trade). The condition – Montreal will receive the best of Dallas', Winnipeg's, or New Jersey's fourth-round picks in 2026 – was converted when Winnipeg completed the season with the fewest standings points of the three teams.
  New Jersey previously acquired this pick as the result of a trade on March 8, 2024, that sent Colin Miller to Winnipeg in exchange for this pick.
6. The Florida Panthers' fourth-round pick went to the Boston Bruins as the result of a trade on June 18, 2026, that sent the contract of Andre Gasseau and a 2026 fourth-round pick (120th overall) to San Jose in exchange for Montreal's 2026 fifth-round pick (157th overall) and this pick.
  San Jose previously acquired this pick as the result of a trade on March 6, 2025, that sent Nico Sturm and a seventh-round pick in 2027 to Florida in exchange for this pick.
7. The San Jose Sharks' fourth-round pick went to the Carolina Hurricanes as the result of a trade on January 16, 2026, that sent Chicago's fifth-round pick in 2027 to Carolina in exchange for Kyle Masters and this pick.
8. The New Jersey Devils fourth-round pick went to the Detroit Red Wings as the result of a trade on June 25, 2026, that sent Amadeus Lombardi to New Jersey in exchange for this pick.
9. The Columbus Blue Jackets' fourth-round pick went to the Ottawa Senators as the result of a trade on March 5, 2026, that sent David Perron to Detroit in exchange for this pick (being conditional at the time of the trade). The condition – Ottawa will receive Columbus' fourth-round pick in 2026 if Detroit fails to win a round in the 2026 playoffs, or Perron fails to play in 50% of Detroit's first-round playoff games – was converted when Detroit was eliminated from playoff contention on April 11, 2026.
  Detroit previously acquired this pick as the result of a trade on June 28, 2025, that sent a third-round pick in 2025 to Columbus in exchange for a fourth-round pick in 2025 and this pick.
10. The Detroit Red Wings' fourth-round pick went to the Pittsburgh Penguins as the result of a trade on June 27, 2026, that sent a 2026 sixth-round pick (170th overall) and a 2027 fourth-round pick to Boston in exchange for this pick.
  Boston previously acquired this pick as the result of a trade on January 16, 2026, that sent Jeffrey Viel to Anaheim in exchange for this pick (being conditional at the time of the trade). The condition – Boston will receive the better of Detroit or Philadelphia's fourth-round pick in 2026 – was converted on April 13, 2026 when Philadelphia qualified for the 2026 Stanley Cup playoffs after Detroit had already been eliminated from playoff contention.
  Anaheim previously acquired this pick as the result of a trade on June 28, 2025, that sent John Gibson to Detroit in exchange for Petr Mrázek, a second-round pick in 2027 and this pick.
11. The Washington Capitals' fourth-round pick went to the Minnesota Wild as the result of a trade on June 27, 2026, that sent a 2026 fourth-round pick (121st overall) and a 2026 sixth-round pick (185th overall) to Columbus in exchange for this pick.
  Columbus previously acquired this pick as the result of a trade on June 27, 2026, that sent a 2026 fourth-round pick (101st overall) to Washington in exchange for a 2028 fifth-round pick and this pick.
12. The Los Angeles Kings' fourth-round pick went to the Vegas Golden Knights as the result of a trade on June 27, 2026, that sent a 2026 fourth-round pick (117th overall) and a 2026 seventh-round pick (223rd overall) to Montreal in exchange for this pick.
  Montreal previously acquired this pick as the result of a trade on June 27, 2026, that sent a 2026 fourth-round pick (103rd overall) to Los Angeles in exchange for a 2026 sixth-round pick (190th overall) and this pick.
13. The Anaheim Ducks' fourth-round pick went to the Toronto Maple Leafs as the result of a trade on March 6, 2026, that sent Bobby McMann to Seattle in exchange for a conditional second-round pick in 2027 and this pick.
  Seattle previously acquired this pick as the result of a trade on July 2, 2024, that sent Brian Dumoulin to Anaheim in exchange for this pick.
14. The Edmonton Oilers' fourth-round pick went to the Winnipeg Jets as the result of a trade on March 6, 2026, that sent Logan Stanley and Luke Schenn to Buffalo in exchange for Isak Rosén, Jacob Bryson, a second-round pick in 2027 and this pick (being conditional at the time of the trade). The condition – Winnipeg will receive the earlier of Edmonton or Buffalo's fourth-round picks in 2026 – was converted on April 30, 2026 when Edmonton was eliminated from the 2026 Stanley Cup playoffs ensuring they would have an earlier pick than Buffalo.
  Buffalo previously acquired this pick as the result of a trade on March 7, 2025, that sent Henri Jokiharju to Boston in exchange for this pick.
  Boston previously acquired this pick as the result of a trade that sent Petr Hauser and Max Jones to Edmonton in exchange for Max Wanner, St. Louis' second-round pick in 2025.
15. The Philadelphia Flyers' fourth-round pick went to the Montreal Canadiens as the result of a trade on June 27, 2026, that sent a 2026 fourth-round pick (113th overall) to Vegas in exchange for a 2026 seventh-round pick (223rd overall) and this pick.
  Vegas previously acquired this pick as the result of a trade on June 26, 2026, that sent a 2026 first-round pick (28th overall) to Anaheim in exchange for a 2026 first-round pick (29th overall) and this pick.
  Anaheim previously acquired this pick as the result of a trade on June 23, 2025, that sent Trevor Zegras to Philadelphia in exchange for Ryan Poehling, a second-round pick in 2025 and this pick.
16. The Pittsburgh Penguins' fourth-round pick went to the Nashville Predators as the result of a trade on March 5, 2025, that sent Tommy Novak and Luke Schenn to Pittsburgh in exchange for Michael Bunting and this pick.
17. The Ottawa Senators' fourth-round pick went to the New Jersey Devils as the result of a trade on June 27, 2026, that sent the New York Rangers' 2026 second-round pick (25th overall) to Chicago in exchange for Toronto's 2026 second-round pick (27th overall) and this pick.
  Chicago previously acquired this pick as the result of a trade on February 22, 2023, that sent future considerations to Ottawa in exchange for Nikita Zaitsev, a second-round pick in 2023 and this pick.
18. The Boston Bruins' fourth-round pick went to the Philadelphia Flyers as the result of a trade on June 26, 2026, that sent a 2026 first-round pick (21st overall) to San Jose in exchange for Buffalo's 2026 first-round pick (27th overall), Colorado's 2026 second-round pick (62nd overall), and this pick.
  San Jose previously acquired this pick as the result of a trade on June 18, 2026, that sent Florida's 2026 fourth-round pick (104th overall) and Montreal's 2026 fifth-round pick (157th overall) to Boston in exchange for the contract of Andre Gasseau and this pick.
19. The Minnesota Wild's fourth-round pick went to the Columbus Blue Jackets as the result of a trade on June 27, 2026, that sent a 2026 fourth-round pick (112th overall) to Minnesota in exchange for a 2026th sixth-round pick (185th overall) and this pick.
20. The Tampa Bay Lightning's fourth-round pick went to the Boston Bruins as the result of a trade on June 28, 2025, that sent Detroit's fourth-round pick in 2025 to Tampa Bay in exchange for this pick.
21. The Dallas Stars' fourth-round pick went to the St. Louis Blues as the result of a trade on February 4, 2026, that sent Nick Bjugstad to New Jersey in exchange for Thomas Bordeleau and this pick (being conditional at the time of the trade). The condition – St. Louis will receive the lattermost of Dallas, New Jersey or Winnipeg's fourth-round picks in 2026 – was converted on April 13, 2026, when Winnipeg was eliminated from playoff contention, leaving Dallas as the only one of the three to qualify for the 2026 Stanley Cup playoffs.
  New Jersey previously acquired this pick as the result of a trade on February 28, 2024, that sent Christopher Tanev to Dallas in exchange for this pick.
22. The Montreal Canadiens' fourth-round pick went to the Carolina Hurricanes as the result of a trade on June 27, 2026, that sent a 2026 second-round pick (57th overall) to Montreal in exchange for a 2026 second-round pick (61st overall) and this pick.
23. The Vegas Golden Knights' fourth-round pick went to the San Jose Sharks as the result of a trade on March 6, 2026, that sent Timothy Liljegren to Washington in exchange for this pick.
  Washington previously acquired this pick as the result of a trade on March 5, 2024, that sent Anthony Mantha to Vegas in exchange for a second-round pick in 2024 and this pick.
24. The Carolina Hurricanes' fourth-round pick went to the Colorado Avalanche as the result of a three-team trade on January 24, 2025, that sent Mikko Rantanen to Carolina in exchange for Jack Drury, Martin Necas, a second-round pick in 2025, and this pick.

=== Round five ===
Nicholas Bogas was selected 135th overall by the St. Louis Blues.

#	Player	Nationality	NHL team	College/junior/club team
129	Connor Davis (RW)	Canada	Vancouver Canucks	Cedar Rapids RoughRiders (USHL)
130	Theodor Knights (D)	Sweden	Utah Mammoth (from Chicago^{1})	MoDo Hockey U20 (U20 Nationell)
131	Finn Kearns (D)	Canada	Seattle Kraken (from New York Rangers^{2})	St. Andrews Saints (HS-ON)
132	Simon Katolicky (LW)	Finland	Calgary Flames	Sarnia Sting (OHL)
133	Andrew Robinson (D)	Canada	Edmonton Oilers (from Toronto via Tampa Bay^{3})	Windsor Spitfire (OHL)
134	Morgan Anderberg (C)	Sweden	Tampa Bay Lightning (from Seattle^{4})	Vaxjo Lakers (SHL)
135	Alexandre Talliefer (D)	Canada	Winnipeg Jets	Quebec Remparts (QMJHL)
136	KJ Sauer (C)	United States	Philadelphia Flyers (from Florida^{5})	Andover Huskies (HS-MN)
137	Filip Ruzicka (G)	Czech Republic	Minnesota Wild (from San Jose^{6})	Brandon Wheat Kings (WHL)
138	Philip Hemmyr (LW)	Sweden	Nashville Predators	IF Bjorkloven (SHL)
139	Nicholas Bogas (D)	United States	St. Louis Blues	U.S. NTDP (USHL)
140	Cole Tuminaro (D)	United States	Colorado Avalanche (from New Jersey^{7})	Chicago Steel (USHL)
141	Vladimir Dravecky (D)	Czech Republic	New York Islanders	Brantford Bulldogs (OHL)
142	Parker Snell (G)	Canada	Columbus Blue Jackets	Edmonton Oil Kings (WHL)
143	Beckham Edwards (C)	Canada	Detroit Red Wings	Sarnia Sting (OHL)
144	Brian McFadden (D)	United States	Washington Capitals	Thayer Tigers (HS-MA)
145	Vertti Svensk (D)	Finland	Los Angeles Kings	SaiPa (Liiga)
146	Eric Frossard (D)	Canada	Anaheim Ducks	Guelph Storm (OHL)
147	Florent Houle (RW)	Canada	Utah Mammoth	Sherbrooke Phoenix (QMJHL)
148	Luken Huff (D)	United States	Seattle Kraken (from Edmonton via Nashville and New York Rangers^{8})	Cedar Rapids RoughRiders (USHL)
149	Daniil Rusakovich (G)	Belarus	New Jersey Devils (from Philadelphia via Colorado^{9})	Dinamo-Shinnik Bobruysk (MHL)
150	Carter Stevens (RW)	Canada	St. Louis Blues (from Pittsburgh^{10})	Guelph Storm (OHL)
151	Harris Pangretitsch (D)	Canada	Ottawa Senators	Sault Ste. Marie Greyhounds (OHL)
152	Theodore Lechner (D)	United States	Colorado Avalanche (from Boston^{11})	Holy Angels Stars (HS-MN)
153	Giorgois Pantelas (D)	Canada	Los Angeles Kings (from Minnesota^{12})	Brandon Wheat Kings (WHL)
154	Cooper Soller (C)	United States	Tampa Bay Lightning	Sioux Falls Stampede (USHL)
155	Ryan Brown (LW)	Canada	Dallas Stars	London Knights (OHL)
156	Domán Szongoth (C)	Hungary	Buffalo Sabres	KooKoo U20 (U20 SM-sarja)
157	Jacob Vandeven (D)	Canada	Boston Bruins (from Montreal via San Jose^{13})	Komoka Kings (GOJHL)
158	Cooper Williams (C)	Canada	Toronto Maple Leafs (from Colorado^{14})	Saskatoon Blades (WHL)
159	Will McLaughlin (D)	Canada	Vegas Golden Knights	Portland Winterhawks (WHL)
160	Matvei Nikonovich (G)	Belarus	Pittsburgh Penguins (from Carolina via Nashville^{15})	Ladia Togliatti (MHL)

1. The Chicago Blackhawks' fifth-round pick went to the Utah Mammoth as the result of a trade on March 7, 2025, that sent Aku Raty, Victor Soderstrom and the contract of Shea Weber to Chicago in exchange for this pick.
2. The New York Rangers' fifth-round pick went to the Seattle Kraken as the result of a trade on June 27, 2026, that sent a fourth-round pick (102nd overall) to New York in exchange for Edmonton's 2026 fifth-round pick (146th overall) and this pick.
3. The Toronto Maple Leafs' fifth-round pick went to the Edmonton Oilers as the result of a trade on June 27, 2026, that sent a 2026 second-round pick (52nd overall) to Tampa Bay in exchange for a 2026 second-round pick (58th overall) and this pick.
  Tampa previously acquired this pick as the result of a trade on June 19, 2026, that sent Darren Raddysh to Toronto in exchange for this pick.
4. The Seattle Kraken's fifth-round pick went to the Tampa Bay Lightning as the result of a trade on March 5, 2025, that sent Mikey Eyssimont, conditional first-round picks in 2026 and 2027, and Toronto's second-round pick in 2025 to Seattle in exchange for Kyle Aucoin, Oliver Bjorkstrand, and this pick.
5. The Florida Panthers fifth-round pick went to the Philadelphia Flyers as the result of a trade on June 25, 2026, that sent Garnet Hathaway and a sixth-round pick in 2026 to Florida in exchange for a fourth-round pick in 2027, and this pick.
6. The San Jose Sharks' fifth-round pick went to the Minnesota Wild as the result of a trade on November 8, 2023, that sent Calen Addison to San Jose in exchange for Adam Raska and this pick.
7. The New Jersey Devils' fifth-round pick went to the Colorado Avalanche as the result of a trade on June 27, 2026, that sent a 2026 fifth-round pick (149th overall) and a 2026 seventh-round pick (222nd overall) to New Jersey in exchange for this pick.
8. The Edmonton Oilers' fifth-round pick went to the Seattle Kraken as the result of a trade on June 27, 2026, that sent a 2026 fourth-round pick (102nd overall) to the New York Rangers in exchange for a 2026 fifth-round pick (131st overall) and this pick.
  New York previously acquired this pick as the result of a trade on June 27, 2026, that sent Adam Edstrom to Nashville in exchange for Massimo Rizzo and this pick.
  Nashville previously acquired this pick as the result of a trade on June 28, 2025, that sent a fifth-round pick in 2025 to Edmonton in exchange for this pick.
9. The Philadelphia Flyers' fifth-round pick went to the New Jersey Devils as the result of a trade on June 27, 2026, that sent a 2026 fifth-round pick (149th overall) and a 2026 7th-round pick (222nd overall) to Colorado in exchange for this pick.
  Colorado previously acquired this pick as the result of a trade on March 6, 2024, that sent Ryan Johansen and a conditional first-round pick in 2025 to Philadelphia in exchange for Sean Walker and this pick.
10. The Pittsburgh Penguins' fifth-round pick went to the St. Louis Blues as the result of a trade on August 13, 2024, that sent Ottawa's third-round pick in 2025 and a second-round pick in 2026 to Pittsburgh in exchange for St. Louis' second-round pick in 2025 and this pick.
11. The Boston Bruins' fifth-round pick went to the Colorado Avalanche as the result of a trade on March 7, 2025, that sent Casey Mittelstadt, Will Zellers, and a conditional second-round pick in 2025 to Boston in exchange for Charlie Coyle and this pick.
12. The Minnesota Wild's fifth-round pick went to the Los Angeles Kings as the result of a trade on June 27, 2026, that sent a 2026 third-round pick (83rd overall) to Minnesota in exchange for a 2026 third-round pick (89th overall) and this pick.
13. The Montreal Canadiens' fifth-round pick went to the Boston Bruins as the result of a trade on June 18, 2026, that sent a 2026 fourth-round pick and the contract of Andre Gasseau to San Jose in exchange for this pick.
  San Jose previously acquired this pick as the result of a trade on September 5, 2025, that sent Gannon Laroque to Montreal in exchange for Carey Price and this pick.
14. The Colorado Avalanche's fifth-round pick went to the Toronto Maple Leafs as the result of a trade on March 5, 2026, that sent Nicolas Roy to Colorado in exchange for a conditional first-round pick in 2027 and this pick (being conditional at the time of the trade). The condition – Toronto will receive the lattermost of Boston, Colorado, and Philadelphia's fifth-round picks in 2026 – was converted when Philadelphia was eliminated from the 2026 Stanley Cup playoffs on May 9, guaranteeing Colorado's pick as the lattermost of the three.
15. The Carolina Hurricanes' fifth-round pick went to the Pittsburgh Penguins as the result of a trade on June 27, 2026, that sent a fifth-round pick in 2028 to Nashville in exchange for this pick.
  Nashville previously acquired this pick as the result of a trade on March 7, 2025, that sent Mark Jankowski to Carolina in exchange for this pick.

=== Round six ===
Parker Trottier was selected 189th overall by the Montreal Canadiens.

#	Player	Nationality	NHL team	College/junior/club team
161	Yaroslav Fedoseyev (D)	Russia	Toronto Maple Leafs (from Vancouver Canucks^{1})	Belye Medvedi Chelyabinsk (MHL)
162	Andre Mondoux (D)	Canada	New York Rangers (from Chicago via Buffalo^{2})	Kingston Frontenacs (OHL)
163	Darian Anderson (RW)	United States	New York Rangers	Flint Firebirds (OHL)
164	Bode Laylin (D)	United States	Calgary Flames	Tri-City Storm (USHL)
165	Zachary Jovanoski (G)	Canada	Carolina Hurricanes (from Toronto^{3})	Guelph Storm (OHL)
166	Ola Palme (D)	Sweden	Seattle Kraken	Växjö Lakers (SHL)
167	Landon Hafele (C)	United States	Winnipeg Jets	Green Bay Gamblers (USHL)
168	Vilho Vanhatalo (RW)	Finland	Florida Panthers	Tappara (Liiga)
169	Brody Pepoy (RW)	United States	Toronto Maple Leafs (from San Jose^{4})	Saginaw Spirit (OHL)
170	Roberto Henriquez (G)	Slovakia	Boston Bruins (from Nashville via Pittsburgh^{5})	Green Bay Gamblers (USHL)
171	Lars Steiner (RW)	Switzerland	St. Louis Blues	Rouyn-Noranda Huskies (QMJHL)
172	Luke Wilfley (C)	United States	New Jersey Devils	Portland Winterhawks (WHL)
173	Artyon Matyuk (C)	Russia	New York Islanders	Chaika Nizhny Novgorod (MHL)
174	Jake Gustafson (C)	United States	San Jose Sharks (from Columbus via Philadelphia^{6})	Portland Winterhawks (WHL)
175	Luka Arkko (LW)	Finland	Detroit Red Wings	Pelicans U20 (U20 SM-sarja)
176	Lucian Bernat (RW)	Slovakia	Vancouver Canucks (from Washington^{7})	Tappara U20 (U20 SM-sarja)
177	Alex Kostov (RW)	Canada	Los Angeles Kings	Flint Firebirds (OHL)
178	Gleb Peshkov (G)	Russia	Anaheim Ducks	Taifun Primorsky Krai (MHL)
179	Benjamin Cossette-Ayotte (D)	Canada	Nashville Predators (from Utah^{8})	Val-d'Or Foreurs (QMJHL)
180	Caden Harvey (C)	United States	Edmonton Oilers	Windsor Spitfire (OHL)
181	Cole Zurawski (RW)	Canada	Florida Panthers (from Philadelphia^{9})	Owen Sound Attack (OHL)
182	Anttoni Uronen (C)	Finland	Columbus Blue Jackets (from Pittsburgh^{10})	HIFK Hockey (Liiga)
183	Alexander Grunin (D)	Russia	Ottawa Senators	Sibirskie Snaipery Novosibirsk (MHL)
184	Samuel Eriksson (D)	Sweden	Vancouver Canucks (from Boston via Minnesota^{11})	Färjestad BK U20 (U20 Nationell)
185	Jonas Woo (D)	Canada	Columbus Blue Jackets (from Minnesota^{12})	Medicine Hat Tigers (WHL)
186	Stepan Shurygin (G)	Russia	Tampa Bay Lightning	Saginaw Spirit (OHL)
187	Anton Emil Wilde Larsen (G)	Denmark	Dallas Stars	Frederikshavn White Hawks (Metal Liagen)
188	Dylan Dumont (RW)	Canada	Buffalo Sabres	Drummondville Voltigeurs (QMJHL)
189	Parker Trottier (LW)	United States	Montreal Canadiens	U.S. NTDP (USHL)
190	Wesley Royston (RW)	Canada	Montreal Canadiens (from Colorado via Ottawa and Los Angeles^{13})	Owen Sound Attack (OHL)
191	Matthew Minchak (G)	United States	Vegas Golden Knights	Kingston Frontenacs (OHL)
192	Noah Kosick (C)	Canada	Anaheim Ducks (from Carolina^{4})	Seattle Thunderbirds (WHL)

1. The Vancouver Canucks' sixth-round pick went to the Toronto Maple Leafs as the result of a trade on March 27, 2026, that sent a fifth-round pick in 2027 to Vancouver in exchange for this pick.
2. The Chicago Blackhawks' sixth-round pick went to the New York Rangers as the result of a trade on March 6, 2026, that sent Sam Carrick to Buffalo in exchange for a third-round pick in 2026 and this pick.
3. The Toronto Maple Leafs' sixth-round pick went to the Carolina Hurricanes as the result of a trade on March 7, 2024, that sent Cade Webber to Toronto in exchange for this pick.
4. The San Jose Sharks' sixth-round pick went to the Toronto Maple Leafs as the result of a trade on October 30, 2024 that sent Timothy Liljegren to San Jose in exchange for Matt Benning, a conditional third-round pick in 2025 and this pick.
5. The Nashville Predators' sixth-round pick went to the Boston Bruins as the result of a trade on June 27, 2026, that sent a 2026 fourth-round pick (111th overall) to Pittsburgh in exchange for a 2027 fourth-round pick and this pick.
  Pittsburgh previously acquired this pick as the result of a trade on August 13, 2024, that sent Jordan Frasca to Nashville for Cody Glass, Minnesota Wild's third-round pick in 2025 and this pick.
6. The Columbus Blue Jackets' sixth-round pick went to the San Jose Sharks as the result of a trade on October 5, 2025, that sent Carl Grundström and Artem Guryev to Philadelphia in exchange for Ryan Ellis and this pick (being conditional at the time of the trade). The condition – San Jose will receive the earlier of Columbus or Philadelphia's sixth-round picks in 2026 – was converted on April 13, 2026, when Philadelphia qualified for the 2026 Stanley Cup playoffs after Columbus had already been eliminated from playoff contention.
  Philadelphia previously acquired this pick as the result of a trade on September 14, 2025, that sent Ivan Fedotov to Columbus in exchange for this pick.
7. The Washington Capitals' sixth-round pick went to the Vancouver Canucks as the result of a trade on March 6, 2026, that sent David Kampf to Washington in exchange for this pick.
8. The Utah Mammoth's sixth-round pick went to the Nashville Predators as the result of a trade on June 28, 2025, that sent Colorado's sixth-round pick in 2025 to Utah in exchange for this pick.
9. The Philadelphia Flyers sixth-round pick went to the Florida Panthers as the result of a trade on June 25, 2026, that sent a fifth-round pick in 2026, and a fourth-round pick in 2027 to Philadelphia in exchange for Garnet Hathaway, and this pick.
10. The Pittsburgh Penguins' sixth-round pick went to the Columbus Blue Jackets as the result of a trade on February 22, 2024, that sent Emil Bemstrom to Pittsburgh in exchange for Alexander Nylander and this pick (being conditional at the time of the trade). The condition – Columbus will receive a sixth-round pick in 2026 if Bemstrom scores fewer than six goals for Pittsburgh in the 2023–24 NHL season – was converted at the end of the Penguins' season on April 17, 2024.
11. The Boston Bruins' sixth-round pick went to the Vancouver Canucks as the result of a trade on March 6, 2026, that sent Lukas Reichel to Boston in exchange for this pick.
  Boston re-acquired this pick as the result of a trade on March 6, 2025, that sent Justin Brazeau to Minnesota in exchange for Jakub Lauko, Marat Khusnutdinov and this pick.
  Minnesota previously acquired this pick as the result of a trade on March 8, 2024, that sent Patrick Maroon to Boston in exchange for Luke Toporowski and this pick (being conditional at the time of the trade). The condition – Minnesota will receive a sixth-round pick in 2026 if Maroon plays in one game for the Bruins during the 2024 Stanley Cup playoffs – was converted on April 20, 2024.
  Buffalo previously acquired this pick as the result of a trade on July 1, 2025, that sent Sam Lafferty to Chicago in exchange for this pick.
12. The Minnesota Wild's sixth-round pick went to the Columbus Blue Jackets as the result of a trade on June 27, 2026, that sent a 2026 fourth-round pick (112th overall) to Minnesota in exchange for a 2026 fourth-round pick (121st overall) and this pick.
13. The Colorado Avalanche's sixth-round pick went to the Montreal Canadiens as the result of a trade on June 27, 2026, that sent a 2026 fourth-round pick (103rd overall) to Los Angeles in exchange for a 2026 fourth-round pick (113th overall) and this pick.
  Los Angeles previously acquired this pick as the result of a trade on June 28, 2025, that sent Jordan Spence to Ottawa in exchange for Nashville's third-round pick in 2025 and this pick.
  Ottawa previously acquired this pick as the result of a trade on July 15, 2024, that sent Kevin Mandolese and a seventh-round pick in 2026 to Colorado in exchange for this pick.
14. The Carolina Hurricanes' sixth-round pick went to the Anaheim Ducks as the result of a trade on June 27, 2026, that sent John Carlson to Carolina in exchange for Kyle Masters and this pick.

=== Round seven ===
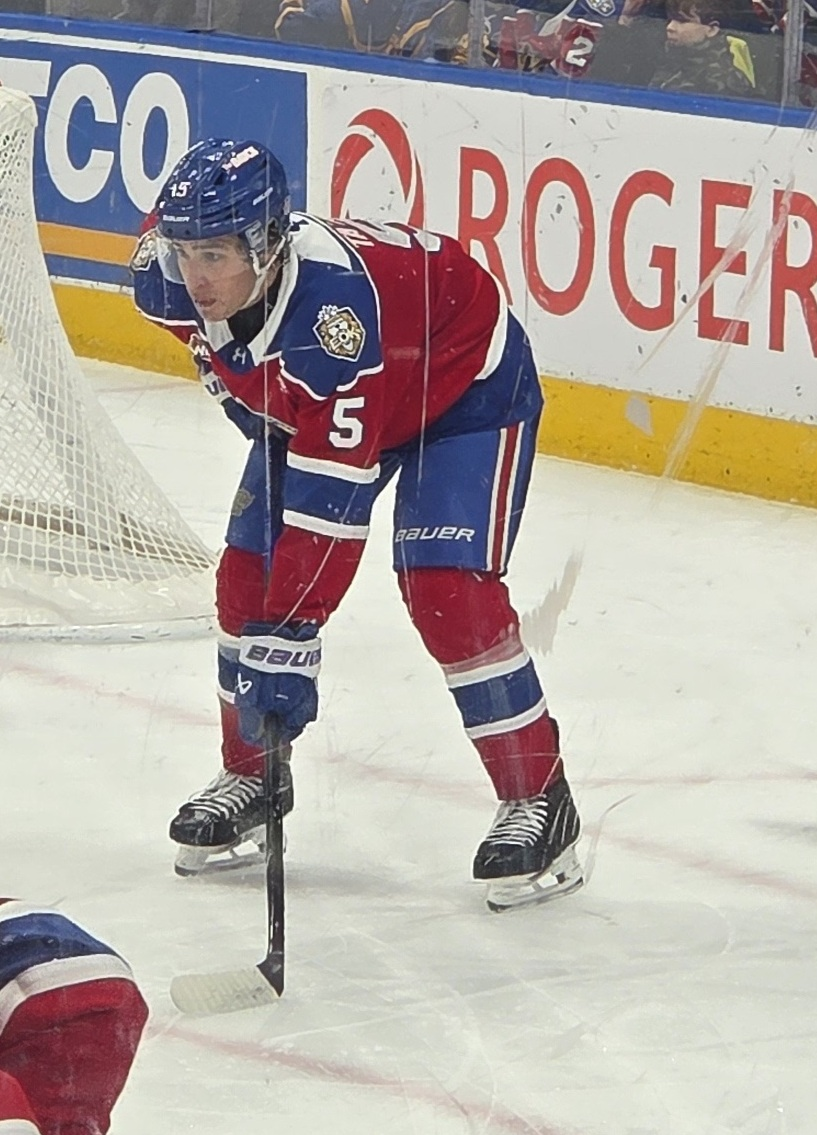
Noa Ta'amu was selected 199th overall by the Winnipeg Jets.

#	Player	Nationality	NHL team	College/junior/club team
193	Ivan Patrikhayev (D)	Russia	New York Rangers (from Vancouver^{1})	CSKA Moscow (KHL)
194	Alexander Ivanov (D)	Russia	Chicago Blackhawks	Bars Kazan (VHL)
195	Shawn Carrier (LW)	Canada	Colorado Avalanche (from NY Rangers via Nashville^{2})	Halifax Mooseheads (QMJHL)
196	Myles Brosnan (D)	United States	Detroit Red Wings (from Calgary^{3})	Dexter Southfield Shield (HS-MA)
197	Jasper Kuhta (C)	Finland	Dallas Stars (from Toronto^{4})	Ottawa 67's (OHL)
198	Rylan Singh (D)	Canada	Seattle Kraken	Guelph Storm (OHL)
199	Noa Ta'amu (D)	United States	Winnipeg Jets	Edmonton Oil Kings (WHL)
200	William Sorbrand (C)	Sweden	Chicago Blackhawks (from Florida^{5})	Timra IK (SHL)
201	Alexander Karmanov (D)	Moldova	San Jose Sharks	North Bay Battalion (OHL)
202	Charlie Puglisi (C)	United States	Nashville Predators	Winchendon Wapitis (HS-MA)
203	Colin Fitzgerald (C)	Canada	St. Louis Blues	Sault Ste. Marie Greyhounds (OHL)
204	William Tomko (C)	United States	Seattle Kraken (from New Jersey^{6})	Sioux City Musketeers (USHL)
205	Bobby Cowan (RW)	United States	New York Islanders	Western Michigan Broncos (NCHC)
206	Filip Novak (LW)	Czech Republic	Columbus Blue Jackets	HC Sparta Praha (Czech Extraliga)
207	Noel Pakarinen (LW)	Finland	Vegas Golden Knights (from Detroit^{7})	Kiekko-Espoo (U20 SM-sarja)
208	Logan Stuart (C)	United States	Washington Capitals	U.S. NTDP (USHL)
209	Tobias Krestan (RW)	Germany	Los Angeles Kings	HV71 (J20 Nationell)
210	Jimmy Rieber (D)	United States	Anaheim Ducks	Waterloo Black Hawks (USHL)
211	Artyom Prima (RW)	Russia	Utah Mammoth	Omaha Lancers (USHL)
212	Ryan Cameron (G)	United States	Edmonton Oilers	Cedar Rapids RoughRiders (USHL)
213	Max Laatikainen (D)	Finland	Philadelphia Flyers	Kiekko-Espoo (U20 SM-sarja)
214	Ondrej Ruml (D)	Czech Republic	Colorado Avalanche (from Pittsburgh^{8})	Ottawa 67's (OHL)
215	Alexandre Raymond (G)	Canada	Colorado Avalanche (from Ottawa^{9})	Rouyn-Noranda Huskies (QMJHL)
216	Cullen McCrate (D)	United States	Boston Bruins	Fargo Force (USHL)
217	Louis-Antoine Denault (G)	Canada	Florida Panthers (from Minnesota^{10})	Newfoundland Regiment (QMJHL)
218	Max Vilen (D)	Sweden	Tampa Bay Lightning	Moncton Wildcats (QMJHL)
219	Mikhail Cherepanov (D)	Russia	Dallas Stars	New Hampshire Mountain Kings (NAHL)
220	John Parsons (G)	United States	Winnipeg Jets (from Buffalo^{11})	Providence Friars (HE)
221	Jean-Samuel Daigneault (D)	Canada	Montreal Canadiens	Muskegon Lumberjacks (USHL)
222	Quinn McKenzie (C)	United States	New Jersey Devils (from Colorado^{12})	Sault Ste. Marie Greyhounds (OHL)
223	Lucas Ambrosio (D)	Canada	Los Angeles Kings (from Vegas^{13})	Erie Otters (OHL)
224	Tyler Deakos (RW)	Canada	Montreal Canadiens (from Carolina^{14})	Waterloo Black Hawks (USHL)

1. The Vancouver Canucks' seventh-round pick went to the New York Rangers as the result of a trade on February 25, 2023, that sent Vitali Kravtsov to Vancouver in exchange for Will Lockwood and this pick.
2. The New York Rangers' seventh-round pick went to the Colorado Avalanche as the result of a trade on December 28, 2024, that sent Ondrej Pavel and a third-round pick in 2027 to Nashville, in exchange for Juuso Parssinen and this pick.
  Nashville previously acquired this pick as the result of a trade on June 29, 2024, that sent a fourth-round pick in 2024 to New York in exchange for a fourth-round pick in 2024 and this pick.
3. The Calgary Flames' seventh-round pick went to the Detroit Red Wings as the result of a trade on June 28, 2025, that sent St. Louis's seventh-round pick in 2025 to Calgary in exchange for this pick.
4. The Toronto Maple Leafs' seventh-round pick will go the Dallas Stars as the result of a trade on June 29, 2024, that sent Chris Tanev to Toronto in exchange for Max Ellis and this pick.
5. The Florida Panthers' seventh-round pick went to the Chicago Blackhawks as the result of a trade on June 28, 2025, that sent a seventh-round pick in 2025 to Florida in exchange for this pick.
6. The New Jersey Devils' seventh-round pick went to the Seattle Kraken as the result of a trade on March 7, 2025, that sent Daniel Sprong to New Jersey in exchange for this pick.
7. The Detroit Red Wings' seventh-round pick went to the Vegas Golden Knights as the result of a trade on June 27, 2026, that sent a 2027 seventh-round pick to Detroit in exchange for this pick.
8. The Pittsburgh Penguins' seventh-round pick went to the Colorado Avalanche as the result of a trade on January 20, 2026, that sent Ilya Solovyov to Pittsburgh in exchange for Valtteri Puustinen and this pick.
9. The Ottawa Senators' seventh-round pick went to the Colorado Avalanche as the result of a trade on July 15, 2024, that sent a sixth-round pick in 2026 to Ottawa in exchange for Kevin Mandolese and this pick.
10. The Minnesota Wild's seventh-round pick went to the Florida Panthers as the result of a trade on March 5, 2026, that sent Jeff Petry to Minnesota in exchange for this pick (being conditional at the time of the trade). The condition – Florida will receive Minnesota's seventh-round pick in 2026 if Minnesota fails to reach the 2026 Western Conference final, or if Petry fails to play in 50% of Minnesota's first and second-round playoff games – was converted when Petry was scratched from game three of Minnesota's second-round series against Colorado on May 9, mathematically eliminating him from playing 50% of Minnesota's first and second-round games.
11. The Buffalo Sabres' seventh-round pick went to the Winnipeg Jets as the result of a trade on March 6, 2026, that sent Tanner Pearson to Buffalo in exchange for this pick.
12. The Colorado Avalanche's seventh-round pick went to the New Jersey Devils as the result of a trade on June 27, 2026, that sent a 2026 fifth-round pick (140th overall) to Colorado in exchange for a 2026 fifth-round pick (149th overall) and this pick.
13. The Vegas Golden Knights' seventh-round pick went to the Los Angeles Kings as the result of a trade on June 27, 2026, that sent a 2027 seventh-round pick to Montreal in exchange for this pick.
  Montreal previously acquired this pick as the result of a trade on June 27, 2026, that sent a 2026 fourth-round pick (113th overall) to Vegas in exchange for a 2026 fourth-round pick (117th overall) and this pick.
14. The Carolina Hurricanes' seventh-round pick went to the Montreal Canadiens as the result of a trade on June 30, 2025, that sent Cayden Primeau to Carolina in exchange for this pick.

== Draftees based on nationality ==
Rank	Country	Selections	Percent	Top selection
	North America	125	56.1%	
1	Canada	69	30.9%	Gavin McKenna, 1st
2	USA	55	24.7%	Chase Reid, 7th
3	Cayman Islands	1	0.4%	Jaxon Cover, 32nd
	Eurasia	98	43.9%	
1	Russia	25	11.2%	Ilia Morozov, 20th
2	Sweden	24	10.8%	Ivar Stenberg, 2nd
3	Finland	13	5.8%	Oscar Hemming, 14th
3	Czech Republic	13	5.8%	Adam Novotny, 24th
5	Slovakia	8	3.6%	Adam Goljer, 49th
6	Latvia	4	1.8%	Alberts Šmits, 5th
7	Belarus	3	1.3%	Yaroslav Bryzgalov, 97th
8	Lithuania	1	0.4%	Simas Ignatavicius, 40th
8	Norway	1	0.4%	Niklas Aaram-Olsen, 41st
8	Kazakhstan	1	0.4%	Danai Shaiikov, 67th
8	Hungary	1	0.4%	Domán Kristóf Szongoth, 156th
8	Switzerland	1	0.4%	Lars Steiner, 171st
8	Denmark	1	0.4%	Anton Emil Wilde Larsen, 187th
8	Moldova	1	0.4%	Alexander Karmanov, 201st
8	Germany	1	0.4%	Tobias Krestan, 209th

=== North American draftees by birth state/province ===
Rank	Country	State/province	Selections	Percent	Top selection
1	Canada	Ontario	27	12.1%	Ethan Belchetz, 17th
2	Canada	Quebec	15	6.7%	Maddox Dagenais, 16th
3	Canada	Alberta	11	4.9%	Daxon Rudolph, 4th
3	USA	Minnesota	11	4.9%	Wyatt Cullen, 10th
5	USA	California	8	3.6%	Brooks Rogowski, 33rd
6	Canada	British Columbia	7	3.1%	Caleb Malhotra, 3rd
7	USA	Michigan	6	2.7%	Chase Reid, 7th
8	Canada	Manitoba	4	1.8%	Carson Carels, 6th
8	USA	New York	4	1.8%	Tommy Bleyl, 31st
8	USA	Massachusetts	4	1.8%	Casey Mutryn, 38th
11	USA	Illinois	3	1.3%	Jack Hextall, 30th
11	USA	Pennsylvania	3	1.3%	Caden Harvey, 180th
13	Canada	New Brunswick	2	0.9%	Tynan Lawrence, 11th
13	USA	Florida	2	0.9%	Nikita Klepov, 15th
13	USA	North Carolina	2	0.9%	Beckett Hamilton, 74th
13	USA	New Jersey	2	0.9%	Blake Zielinski, 80th
13	USA	Washington	2	0.9%	Ben Wilmott, 92nd
18	Canada	Yukon	1	0.4%	Gavin McKenna, 1st
18	USA	Texas	1	0.4%	JP Hurlbert, 23rd
18	USA	Tennessee	1	0.4%	Simas Ignatavicius, 40th
18	USA	Ohio	1	0.4%	Rian Chudzinski, 82nd
18	USA	Idaho	1	0.4%	Tyus Sparks, 101st
18	USA	North Dakota	1	0.4%	Lincoln Kuehne, 109th
18	Canada	Saskatchewan	1	0.4%	Jonah Sivertson, 113th
18	USA	New Hampshire	1	0.4%	Vladimír Dravecký, 141st
18	USA	Virginia	1	0.4%	Darian Anderson, 163rd
18	USA	Alaska	1	0.4%	Landon Hafele, 167th
18	USA	Colorado	1	0.4%	Luke Wilfley, 172nd
18	USA	Missouri	1	0.4%	Noa Ta'amu, 199th
18	USA	Maryland	1	0.4%	Quinn McKenzie, 222nd

== See also ==
- 2022–23 NHL transactions
- 2023–24 NHL transactions
- 2024–25 NHL transactions
- 2025–26 NHL transactions
- 2026–27 NHL transactions
- 2026–27 NHL season
- List of first overall NHL draft picks
- List of NHL players
