= E. J. McGuire =

American ice hockey coach (1952–2011)

- Born: June 26, 1952 Buffalo, New York, U.S.
- Died: April 7, 2011 (aged 58) Toronto, Ontario, Canada
- Coached for: Philadelphia Flyers (assistant coach); Chicago Blackhawks (assistant coach); Maine Mariners; Ottawa Senators (assistant coach); Guelph Storm; Hartford Wolf Pack
- Coaching career: 1984–2002

Edward John McGuire (June 26, 1952 – April 7, 2011) was an American ice hockey coach who served as the director of the NHL Central Scouting Services. He earned his PhD in sports psychology from the University of Waterloo in 1990.

== Coaching career ==
A native of Buffalo, New York, McGuire was an assistant coach in the National Hockey League with the Philadelphia Flyers from 1984 to 1988 and the Chicago Blackhawks from 1988 to 1991. His first head coaching job was in 1991–92 with the Maine Mariners of the AHL, which the team ended out of the playoffs with 23–47–10 record. After being let go from that position, he returned to the NHL as an assistant coach with the Ottawa Senators.

After three years in Ottawa, he took his second head coaching position, this time in Canadian major juniors with the Ontario Hockey League's Guelph Storm. With the help of future NHLers, Herberts Vasiļjevs and Dan Cloutier, he led the Storm to the Hamilton Spectator Trophy, as the team with the highest point total in the regular season. Guelph made the playoffs the next year, falling in the semifinals of the OHL Playoffs.

McGuire moved back into professional hockey in 1997, signing on as the head coach with the AHL's Hartford Wolf Pack. After two playoff appearances in two years, he once again stepped back from coaching to focus on scouting. His last coaching position was as an assistant with the Philadelphia Flyers in 2001–02. Afterwards, he began to do more work with the NHL Central Scouting Services.

McGuire served as head coach at SUNY Brockport (ECAC) from 1977 to 1982.

== NHL Central scouting ==
McGuire was the director of NHL Central Scouting from 2005 to 2011. He usually gave his input on the rankings and was a desired interview by NHL media around the rankings time and the draft.

== Awards ==
- Coach of Hamilton Spectator Trophy–winning Guelph Storm in 1995–96

== Death ==
On April 7, 2011, McGuire died in Toronto from cancer (leiomyosarcoma), aged 58.

== Coaching statistics ==
Through 2001–02 season

Season	Team	League	Position	GP	W	L	T	OTL	Pct	Result
1984–85	Philadelphia Flyers	NHL	Assistant							
1985–86	Philadelphia Flyers	NHL	Assistant							
1986–87	Philadelphia Flyers	NHL	Assistant							
1987–88	Philadelphia Flyers	NHL	Assistant							
1988–89	Chicago Blackhawks	NHL	Assistant							
1989–90	Chicago Blackhawks	NHL	Assistant							
1990–91	Chicago Blackhawks	NHL	Assistant							
1991–92	Maine Mariners	AHL	Head	80	23	47	10	0	0.350	No playoffs
1992–93	Ottawa Senators	NHL	Assistant							
1993–94	Ottawa Senators	NHL	Assistant							
1994–95	Ottawa Senators	NHL	Assistant							
1995–96	Guelph Storm	OHL	Head	66	45	16	5	0	0.720	Lost in Finals
1996–97	Guelph Storm	OHL	Head	66	35	25	6	0	0.576	Lost in Semifinals
1997–98	Hartford Wolf Pack	AHL	Head	80	43	24	12	1	0.619	Lost in Semifinals
1998–99	Hartford Wolf Pack	AHL	Head	80	38	31	5	6	0.544	Lost in Quarterfinals
2001–02	Philadelphia Flyers	NHL	Assistant							

== See also ==
- E.J. McGuire Award of Excellence
- List of University of Waterloo people

Preceded by Craig Hartsburg	Head coaches of the Guelph Storm; 1995–1997	Succeeded by George Burnett
