= Alberts Šmits =

Latvian ice hockey player (born 2007)

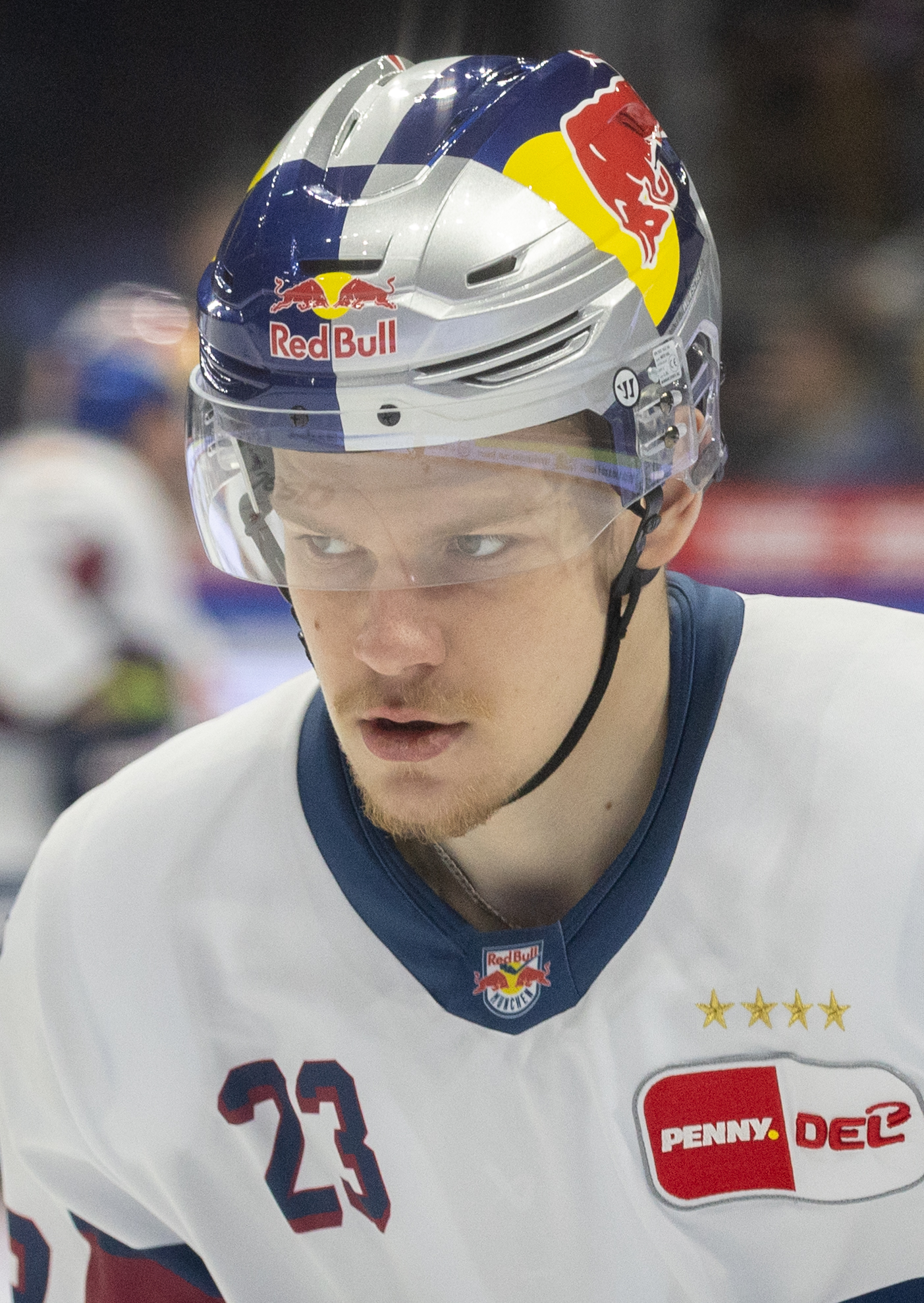
- Šmits in 2026
- Born: 2 December 2007 (age 18) Valmiera, Latvia
- Height: 190 cm (6 ft 3 in)
- Weight: 93 kg (205 lb; 14 st 9 lb)
- Position: Defence
- Shoots: Left
- NHL team Former teams: New York Rangers; Mikkelin Jukurit; Red Bull München
- National team: Latvia
- NHL draft: 5th overall, 2026; New York Rangers
- Playing career: 2024–present

Alberts Šmits (born 2 December 2007) is a Latvian professional ice hockey player who is a defenceman for the New York Rangers of the National Hockey League (NHL). He was drafted fifth overall by the Rangers in the 2026 NHL entry draft. He is the highest-drafted Latvian draft pick in NHL history.

== Early life and playing career ==
Šmits was born on 2 December 2007 in Valmiera, Latvia. He grew up in Latvia and was a member of the ice hockey club Baltu Vilki (a youth team of the R. Laviņš Sports Studio academy, founded by former Latvian international Rodrigo Laviņš), appearing in four games for the Vilki under-17 team in 2021. In the fall of 2021, at age 13, he moved to Finland to seek better opportunities to play hockey, with his parents staying behind. He told NHL.com that, "If I wanted to play hockey, I had to leave. In Latvia, it wasn't really possible at that moment. So that's when I made the decision to move abroad and continue my career in Finland. I moved here alone and lived on my own in Helsinki, which took some getting used to. There weren't really any other options, I just had to manage".

In Helsinki, Šmits found it difficult to find an apartment; Ilta-Sanomat noted that, "Many landlords were not willing to accommodate [a] 13-year-old". Eventually, he was able to move in with an elderly woman who lived in northwest Helsinki, near the rink of the club Karhu-Kissat, which he joined. Initially, he was frequently visited by his parents in Helsinki, but eventually he began living completely independently. He appeared in eight games for the Karhu-Kissat U16 team in the 2021–22 season, posting an assist. He posted four points in five games for the U16 team, two goals in eight games for the U18 team, and one point in one game for the U19 team in 2022–23 season. He also spent time with HIFK on loan. In 28 games for the HIFK U16 team, he posted seven points.

Šmits reached Karhu-Kissat's U20 team in the 2023–24 season, despite being only 15 years old at the start. He posted 18 points in 13 games with the U18 team and 10 points in 25 games for Karhu-Kissat's U20 team. Upon the suggestion of his coach, he tried out for Mikkelin Jukurit in April 2024 and made the junior team. Playing with the U18 team, Šmits totaled 20 points in 20 games in the 2024–25 season, while he also had nine points in 21 games with the U20 team. In the spring of 2025, he was promoted to the senior Jukurit squad. He played in nine games for them in the Finnish Liiga, scoring two points. He signed a contract extension with Jukurit in November 2025, to keep him with the club through 2028.

During the 2025–26 season, Šmits appeared in 38 games for Jukurit, registering six goals and seven assists in that span. In February 2026, he was loaned to Red Bull München of the Deutsche Eishockey Liga (DEL). After managing one assist in his five DEL regular season games with München, he had two goals and four assists in 11 playoff games. Šmits was identified as a top prospect eligible for the 2026 NHL entry draft, and received the E. J. McGuire Award of Excellence, the NHL Central Scouting Bureau's award for the draft prospect "who best exemplifies commitment to excellence through strength of character, competitiveness and athleticism."

Šmits was selected with the fifth overall pick by the New York Rangers in the 2026 NHL entry draft. On 15 July 2026, he was signed to a three-year, entry-level contract by the Rangers. Šmits attended Rangers' training camp for the 2026–27 season and after the conclusion of pre-season camp was named to the opening night roster on 28 September.

== International career ==
Šmits competed for Latvia at the 2024 World U18 Championships, recording three points in five games. In November 2025, he was called up to the senior national team for the 2025 Deutschland Cup after an injury to Roberts Mamčics. In three games, he recorded one assist.

Šmits was selected to the roster of the junior national team for the 2026 World Junior Championships, and had one goal and four assists in five tournament games. He rejoined the senior team as part of the Latvian delegation to the 2026 Winter Olympics. In his Olympic debut, he had two assists in Latvia's four games. Thereafter, he appeared at the 2026 World Championship, where he had four assists prior to Latvia being ousted by Norway in the quarterfinal.

== Career statistics ==
=== Regular season and playoffs ===
			Regular season					Playoffs
Season	Team	League	GP	G	A	Pts	PIM	GP	G	A	Pts	PIM
2024–25	Mikkelin Jukurit	FIN U20	21	4	5	9	2	—	—	—	—	—
2024–25	Mikkelin Jukurit	Liiga	9	1	1	2	4	—	—	—	—	—
2025–26	Mikkelin Jukurit	Liiga	38	6	7	13	20	—	—	—	—	—
2025–26	Red Bull München	DEL	5	0	1	1	2	11	2	4	6	6
Liiga totals			47	7	8	15	24	—	—	—	—	—
DEL totals			5	0	1	1	2	11	2	4	6	8

=== International ===
Year	Team	Event	Result	GP	G	A	Pts	PIM
2025	Latvia	U18	8th	5	1	2	3	2
2026	Latvia	WJC	7th	5	1	4	5	2
2026	Latvia	OG	10th	4	0	2	2	2
2026	Latvia	WC	6th	8	0	4	4	0
Junior totals				10	2	6	8	4
Senior totals				12	0	6	6	2

== Awards and honours ==
Award	Year	Ref
NHL
E. J. McGuire Award of Excellence	2026	
New York Rangers
Lars-Erik Sjoberg Award	2026	

Awards and achievements
Preceded by E. J. Emery	New York Rangers first-round draft pick 2026	Succeeded by Incumbent
