= Ice hockey at the 2024 Winter Youth Olympics – Men's tournament =

2024 Winter Youth Olympics men's ice hockey tournament
Tournament details
- Host country: South Korea
- Venue: 1 (in 1 host city)
- Dates: 27–31 January
- Teams: 6

Final positions
- Champions: United States (2nd title)
- Runners-up: Czech Republic
- Third place: Finland
- Fourth place: Canada

Tournament statistics
- Games played: 10
- Goals scored: 70 (7 per game)
- Attendance: 35,746 (3,575 per game)
- Scoring leader: (United States) Michael Berchild (9 points)

The men's ice hockey tournament was one of four ice hockey events contested as part of the 2024 Winter Youth Olympics in Gangneung, South Korea. The tournament was held from 27 to 31 January at the Gangneung Hockey Centre. Teams comprising players born in 2008 and 2009 represented six nations in the tournament: Canada, Czech Republic, Finland, Slovakia, United States, and host South Korea.

== Officials ==
Ten on-ice officials were selected for the tournament.

Referees

- (Denmark) Rasmus Ankersen
- (Canada) Mathieu Boudreau
- (Norway) Oskar Øvstedal
- (United Kingdom) Joseph Sewell
- (Netherlands) Adler Steenstra

Linesmen

- (Canada) Mitchell Gibbs
- (South Korea) Lim Jun-seo
- (Uzbekistan) David Prokofyev
- (Czech Republic) David Thuma
- (Sweden) Niclas Vestman

International Ice Hockey Federation representative Raeto Raffainer of Switzerland was the tournament chairperson. Chinese speed skater and 2014 Olympic gold medalist Zhang Hong presented medals at the victory ceremony.

== Teams ==
Canada	Goaltenders: Mateo Beites, Colin Ellsworth, Carter Esler; Defensemen: David Croskery, Ryan Lin, Zachary Nyman, Cameron Chartrand, Daxon Rudolph, Keaton Verhoeff; Forwards: Alessandro Di Iorio, Beckham Edwards, Tynan Lawrence, Aiden O'Donnell, Mathis Preston, Liam Ruck, Markus Ruck, Adam Valentini, Braidy Wassilyn
Czech Republic	Goaltenders: Jan Láryš, František Poletín, Martin Psohlavec; Defensemen: Jakub Daněk, Lukáš Kachlíř, Václav Nedorost, Ben Reisnecker, Ondřej Ruml, Jakub Vaněček; Forwards: Šimon Bělohorský, Petr Hanyš, David Huk, Šimon Katolický, Adam Klaus, Filip Novák, Tobiáš Sekanina, Petr Tomek, Matěj Weiss
Finland	Goaltenders: William Gammals, Pyry Lammi, Vili Varonen; Defensemen: Samu Alalauri, Nooa Järvenpää, Juho Piiparinen, Lauri Rantanen, Julius Suominen, Eelis Uronen; Forwards: Luka Arkko, Wilmer Kallio, Jiko Laitinen, Viljo Kähkönen, Matias Myllyniemi, Milo Nuutinen, Rasmus Rinne, Oliver Suvanto, Oliver Torkki
Slovakia	Goaltenders: Dávid Dvořák, Dominik Barčák, Samuel Hrenák; Defensemen: Jakub Syrný, Marko Požgay, Adam Goljer, Roderik Černák, Filip Kovalčík, Matej Bereš; Forwards: Juraj Rausa, Alexej Kubat, Kristian Macák, Timur Trebula, Michal Plančár, Matej Stankoven, Kristian Rezničák, Jonas Ďurčo, Ivan Matta
South Korea	Goaltenders: Song Geun-woo, Lee Dong-geun, Lim Jae-hun; Defensemen: Kim San, Ahn Geon-u, Park Moo-jin, Lee Young-min, Lee Jee-ahn, Lee Hyeong-jin; Forwards: Gong Si-wan, Ryu Hang-yul, Yeo Jun-soo, Lee Seung-jae, Kwak Kyeong-min, Kwak Woo-jin, Min Dong-wook, Cho Seung-hyun, Han Sang-yoon
United States	Goaltenders: Gavin Weeks, Xavier Wendt; Defensemen: Abe Barnett, AJ Francisco, Logan Lutner, Jackson Marthaler, Tyler Martyniuk, Luke Schairer; Forwards: Michael Berchild, Cole Bumgarner, Aurelio Garcia, Shaeffer Gordon-Carroll, JP Hurlbert, Logan Stuart, Spencer Thornborough, Zane Torre, Parker Trottier

Source: IOC

== Preliminary round ==
All times are local (UTC+9).

=== Group A ===
Pos	Team	Pld	W	SOW	SOL	L	GF	GA	GD	Pts	Qualification
1	Czech Republic	2	1	1	0	0	9	7	+2	5	Semifinals
2	United States	2	0	1	1	0	10	10	0	3	Semifinals
3	Slovakia	2	0	0	1	1	6	8	−2	1	

Source: Gangwon 2024

27 January 2024; 14:00	Slovakia	4–5 GWS (1–1, 3–1, 0–2) (SO: 0–1)	United States	Gangneung Hockey Centre; Attendance: 4,056

Game reference

Samuel Hrenák
Goalies
Xavier Wendt
Referees:
(Denmark) Rasmus Ankersen
(United Kingdom) Joseph Sewell
Linesmen:
(Canada) Mitchell Gibbs
(South Korea) Lim Jun-seo

	0–1	01:37 – Torre (Schairer, Garcia)
Syrný (Kubat) – 11:36	1–1
	1–2	18:43 – Hurlbert (Francisco, Berchild) (PP)
Ďurčo (Rausa, Goljer) (PP) – 22:10	2–2
Rezničák – 24:15	3–2
Rezničák (Stankoven) – 29:14	4–2
	4–3	36:57 – Bumgarner (Stuart, Marthaler)
	4–4	44:06 – Torre (Trottier, Berchild) (PP, EA)

Ďurčo (miss)
Goljer (miss)
Shootout
(miss) Hurlbert
Berchild
Francisco
7.5 min
Penalties
4.5 min
20
Shots
39

28 January 2024; 14:00	Czech Republic	3–2 (0–0, 0–0, 3–2)	Slovakia	Gangneung Hockey Centre; Attendance: 3,830

Game reference

Jan Láryš
Goalies
Dávid Dvořák
Referees:
(Canada) Mathieu Boudreau
(Norway) Oskar Øvstedal
Linesmen:
(Canada) Mitchell Gibbs
(Uzbekistan) David Prokofyev

	0–1	33:09 – Kubat (Plančár)
Katolický (Kachlíř, Novák) (PP) – 36:08	1–1
Katolický (Novák) – 37:06	2–1
Tomek (ENG) – 44:17	3–1
	3–2	44:34 – Kovalčík (Macák)

4.5 min
Penalties
4.5 min
36
Shots
24

29 January 2024; 14:00	United States	5–6 GWS (3–1, 2–2, 0–2) (SO: 0–1)	Czech Republic	Gangneung Hockey Centre; Attendance: 3,203

Game reference

Gavin Weeks
Goalies
Jan Láryš
Referees:
(Canada) Mathieu Boudreau
(Netherlands) Adler Steenstra
Linesmen:
(Canada) Mitchell Gibbs
(Uzbekistan) David Prokofyev

Barnett (Francisco, Marthaler) – 05:48	1–0
	1–1	08:39 – Katolický (Kachlíř, Tomek) (PP)
Berchild (Trottier) – 09:30	2–1
Stuart (Barnett) – 14:59	3–1
Schairer (Hurlbert, Berchild) – 20:45	4–1
	4–2	22:29 – Katolický (Tomek)
	4–3	25:57 – Ruml (Nedorost, Hanyš) (PP)
Hurlbert – 27:18	5–3
	5–4	37:26 – Novák (SH)
	5–5	42:49 – Novák (Tomek)

Hurlbert
Berchild (miss)
Francisco (miss)
Stuart (miss)
Bumgarner (miss)
Torre (miss)
Shootout
Katolický
(miss) Huk
(miss) Novák
(miss) Tomek
(miss) Kachlíř
Nedorost
7.5 min
Penalties
4.5 min
35
Shots
19

=== Group B ===
Pos	Team	Pld	W	SOW	SOL	L	GF	GA	GD	Pts	Qualification
1	Canada	2	2	0	0	0	12	1	+11	6	Semifinals
2	Finland	2	1	0	0	1	4	5	−1	3	Semifinals
3	South Korea (H)	2	0	0	0	2	1	11	−10	0	

Source: Gangwon 2024
(H) Host

27 January 2024; 20:00	South Korea	0–8 (0–3, 0–2, 0–3)	Canada	Gangneung Hockey Centre; Attendance: 3,877

Game reference

Lim Jae-hun
Goalies
Carter Esler
Colin Ellsworth
Referees:
(Norway) Oskar Øvstedal
(Netherlands) Adler Steenstra
Linesmen:
(Uzbekistan) David Prokofyev
(Sweden) Niclas Westman

0–1	01:38 – Preston (M. Ruck, Lin) (PP)
0–2	03:03 – L. Ruck (Preston) (PP)
0–3	11:32 – L. Ruck (M. Ruck, Verhoeff)
0–4	15:09 – Di Iorio
0–5	21:34 – L. Ruck (M. Ruck) (SH)
0–6	35:32 – Lawrence (O'Donnell)
0–7	38:25 – O'Donnell (Di Iorio) (SH)
0–8	44:52 – Valentini

6 min
Penalties
3 min
6
Shots
53

28 January 2024; 20:00	Finland	3–1 (1–1, 2–0, 0–0)	South Korea	Gangneung Hockey Centre; Attendance: 3,713

Game reference

William Gammals
Goalies
Lim Jae-hun
Referees:
(Denmark) Rasmus Ankersen
(United Kingdom) Joseph Sewell
Linesmen:
(Czech Republic) David Thuma
(Sweden) Niclas Westman

	0–1	01:01 – Gong (Lee S.)
Arkko (Alalauri, Kähkönen) – 11:05	1–1
Myllyniemi – 24:31	2–1
Torkki (Järvenpää, Kähkönen) – 28:53	3–1

1.5 min
Penalties
1.5 min
46
Shots
8

29 January 2024; 20:00	Canada	4–1 (1–0, 0–0, 3–1)	Finland	Gangneung Hockey Centre; Attendance: 2,083

Game reference

Carter Esler
Goalies
Pyry Lammi
Referees:
(Denmark) Rasmus Ankersen
(Norway) Oskar Øvstedal
Linesmen:
(South Korea) Lim Jun-seo
(Czech Republic) David Thuma

Di Iorio (Edwards) – 11:40	1–0
Di Iorio (Chartrand) – 35:03	2–0
Lin (SH2) – 37:52	3–0
	3–1	38:32 – Alalauri (Piiparinen, Suvanto) (PP2)
Di Iorio (O'Donnell) (ENG) – 43:20	4–1

9 min
Penalties
4.5 min
39
Shots
19

== Playoff round ==
Semifinals
30 January
Czech Republic	3
Finland	1
30 January
Canada	5
United States (GWS)	6

Final
31 January
Czech Republic	0
United States	4
Third place
31 January
Canada	4
Finland (GWS)	5

=== Semifinals ===
30 January 2024; 14:00	Czech Republic	3–1 (0–0, 3–0, 0–1)	Finland	Gangneung Hockey Centre; Attendance: 3,448

Game reference

Jan Láryš
Martin Psohlavec
Goalies
Pyry Lammi
Referees:
(Canada) Mathieu Boudreau
(Netherlands) Adler Steenstra
Linesmen:
(South Korea) Lim Jun-seo
(Uzbekistan) David Prokofyev

Nedorost (Ruml, Bělohorský) (PP2) – 17:14	1–0
Bělohorský (Reisnecker) – 19:06	2–0
Novák (Vaněček, Katolický) – 29:11	3–0
	3–1	34:32 – Kähkönen (Arkko, Torkki)

4.5 min
Penalties
7.5 min
33
Shots
25

30 January 2024; 20:00	Canada	5–6 GWS (0–0, 2–3, 3–2) (SO: 0–1)	United States	Gangneung Hockey Centre; Attendance: 2,238

Game reference

Carter Esler
Mateo Beites
Goalies
Xavier Wendt
Referees:
(Norway) Oskar Øvstedal
(United Kingdom) Joseph Sewell
Linesmen:
(Czech Republic) David Thuma
(Sweden) Niclas Westman

	0–1	16:39 – Trottier
Di Iorio – 17:19	1–1
	1–2	17:58 – Hurlbert (Stuart)
	1–3	19:44 – Gordon-Carroll (Torre)
Nyman (Lin, Preston) (PP2) – 22:38	2–3
Preston – 30:29	3–3
	3–4	32:22 – Trottier (Berchild)
Preston (Lawrence) – 38:31	4–4
	4–5	39:59 – Trottier (Martyniuk, Schairer)
Nyman (Verhoeff, Lawrence) – 42:54	5–5

Di Iorio (miss)
Preston (miss)
Nyman (miss)
Shootout
Hurlbert
(miss) Berchild
(miss) Francisco
1.5 min
Penalties
6 min
42
Shots
17

=== Bronze medal game ===
31 January 2024; 13:00	Canada	4–5 GWS (3–2, 0–2, 1–0) (SO: 0–1)	Finland	Gangneung Hockey Centre; Attendance: 4,652

Game reference

Carter Esler
Goalies
William Gammals
Pyry Lammi
Referees:
(Norway) Oskar Øvstedal
(United Kingdom) Joseph Sewell
Linesmen:
(South Korea) Lim Jun-seo
(Sweden) Niclas Westman

Di Iorio (Edwards) – 06:15	1–0
Lawrence (Lin, O'Donnell) – 06:46	2–0
Verhoeff (Wassilyn) – 06:58	3–0
	3–1	07:27 – Laitinen (Myllyniemi, Rinne)
	3–2	08:20 – Arkko (Kähkönen, Kallio) (PP)
	3–3	25:34 – Kallio (Nuutinen, Suvanto)
	3–4	27:18 – Kähkönen (Arkko, Piiparinen) (PP)
Preston (Lin) – 38:58	4–4

Preston (miss)
Valentini (miss)
Shootout
Uronen
Myllyniemi
7.5 min
Penalties
1.5 min
36
Shots
37

=== Gold medal game ===
31 January 2024; 20:00	Czech Republic	0–4 (0–1, 0–1, 0–2)	United States	Gangneung Hockey Centre; Attendance: 4,646

Game reference

Jan Láryš
Goalies
Xavier Wendt
Referees:
(Denmark) Rasmus Ankersen
(Canada) Mathieu Boudreau
Linesmen:
(Canada) Mitchell Gibbs
(Czech Republic) David Thuma

0–1	08:39 – Berchild (Francisco, Torre) (PP)
0–2	21:04 – Hurlbert (Stuart)
0–3	40:09 – Berchild (Trottier, Hurlbert)
0–4	43:25 – Torre (Berchild, Hurlbert) (PP)

4.5 min
Penalties
1.5 min
29
Shots
23

== Final ranking ==
Pos	Grp	Team	Pld	W	SOW	SOL	L	GF	GA	GD	Pts
1	A	United States	4	1	2	1	0	20	15	+5	8
2	A	Czech Republic	4	2	1	0	1	12	12	0	8
3	B	Finland	4	1	1	0	2	10	12	−2	5
4	B	Canada	4	2	0	2	0	21	12	+9	8
5	A	Slovakia	2	0	0	1	1	6	8	−2	1
6	B	South Korea (H)	2	0	0	0	2	1	11	−10	0

Source: Gangwon 2024
(H) Host
