= 2026 IIHF World U18 Championships =

Under-18 men's ice hockey tournament

2026 IIHF U18 World Championship

Tournament details
- Host country: Slovakia
- Cities: Trenčín; Bratislava
- Venues: 2 (in 2 host cities)
- Dates: 22 April – 2 May 2026
- Teams: 10

Final positions
- Champions: Sweden (3rd title)
- Runners-up: Slovakia
- Third place: Czechia
- Fourth place: Latvia

Tournament statistics
- Games played: 29
- Goals scored: 188 (6.48 per game)
- Attendance: 70,377 (2,427 per game)
- Scoring leader: (Slovakia) Timothy Kazda (12 points)

Awards
- MVP: (Slovakia) Timothy Kazda

Official website
- www.iihf.com

The 2026 IIHF U18 World Championship was the 27th such event organized by the International Ice Hockey Federation. Teams participated at several levels of competition. These tournaments also served as qualifications for the 2027 competition. Teams from Russia and Belarus remained absent, and were set to remain absent for the 2027 competition as well based on a decision by the IIHF Disciplinary Board. However, this decision was annulled on 25 May 2026. The IIHF Council has decided to reintegrate the Belarusian team for 2027, and decided that Russian reintegration will be decided on an event-by-event basis. The impact on 2026 promotion and relegation has not been announced.

== Top Division ==
The Top Division tournament was played in Trenčín and Bratislava, Slovakia, from 22 April to 2 May 2026.

=== Participants ===
Ten teams take part in the competition. Denmark return for the first time since 2019; they replaced Switzerland, who were relegated to Division I A for the first time since 2006, after finishing last in 2025.

| Qualification | Host | Dates | Vacancies | Qualified |
|---|---|---|---|---|
| Top nine in 2025 | (United States) Allen / Frisco | 23 April – 3 May 2025 | 9 | Canada; Sweden; United States; Slovakia; Finland; Germany; Czechia; Latvia; Norway |
| Promoted from Division I | (Hungary) Székesfehérvár | 20–26 April 2025 | 1 | Denmark |

=== Summary of qualified teams ===
| Team | Qualification method | Appearance(s) | | | | Previous best performance |
| Team | Qualification method | Total (Note: In top division. Results in tiers below are excluded.) | First | Last | Streak | Previous best performance |
|---|---|---|---|---|---|---|
| Canada | First in 2025 | 24th | 2002 | 2025 | 24 | Champions (2003, 2008, 2013, 2021, 2024, 2025) |
| Sweden | Second in 2025 | 27th | 1999 | 2025 | 27 | Champions (2019, 2022) |
| United States | Third in 2025 | 27th | 1999 | 2025 | 27 | Champions (eleven times) (Note: United States have won in 2002, 2005, 2006, 2009, 2010, 2011, 2012, 2014, 2015, 2017 and 2023.) |
| Slovakia | Fourth in 2025 | 24th | 1999 | 2025 | 4 | Runners-up (2003) |
| Finland | Fifth in 2025 | 27th | 1999 | 2025 | 27 | Champions (1999, 2000, 2016, 2018) |
| Germany | Sixth in 2025 | 19th | 1999 | 2025 | 2 | Fifth place (2001, 2008) |
| Czechia | Seventh in 2025 | 27th | 1999 | 2025 | 27 | Runners-up (2014) |
| Latvia | Eighth in 2025 | 14th | 2007 | 2025 | 7 | Seventh place (2022) |
| Norway | Ninth in 2025 | 11th | 1999 | 2025 | 4 | Ninth place (2001, 2009, 2011, 2023, 2024, 2025) |
| Denmark | Champions of Division I A | 7th | 2004 | 2019 | 1 | Eighth place (2004) |

=== Preliminary round ===
All times are local (Central European Summer Time; UTC+2).

==== Group A ====
| Pos | Team | Pld | W | OTW | OTL | L | GF | GA | GD | Pts | Qualification |
|---|---|---|---|---|---|---|---|---|---|---|---|
| 1 | Slovakia (H) | 4 | 3 | 0 | 1 | 0 | 17 | 9 | +8 | 10 | Quarterfinals |
| 2 | Canada | 4 | 3 | 0 | 0 | 1 | 22 | 2 | +20 | 9 | Quarterfinals |
| 3 | Finland | 4 | 2 | 1 | 0 | 1 | 13 | 12 | +1 | 8 | Quarterfinals |
| 4 | Latvia | 4 | 1 | 0 | 0 | 3 | 10 | 14 | −4 | 3 | Quarterfinals |
| 5 | Norway | 4 | 0 | 0 | 0 | 4 | 3 | 28 | −25 | 0 | Relegation round |

Source: IIHF
(H) Host

| 22 April 2026; 14:00 | Norway | 1–6 (0–1, 0–2, 1–3) | Finland | Pavol Demitra Ice Stadium, Trenčín; Attendance: 831 |

Game reference

Felix Timraz-Westin
Goalies
Oskari Ahmajärvi
Referees:
(Slovakia) Filip Crman
(Czech Republic) Luděk Pilný
Linesmen:
(Czech Republic) Stanislav Hnát
(Italy) Daniel Rigoni

| | 0–1 | 18:39 – Santala (Laitinen, Fugleberg) |
| | 0–2 | 29:39 – A. Uronen (E. Uronen, Mäkinen) |
| | 0–3 | 36:23 – Santala (Fugleberg) |
| Aaram Olsen (Backlund, Haglund) (PP) – 41:17 | 1–3 |
| | 1–4 | 44:38 – Laatikainen (Fugleberg, Santala) |
| | 1–5 | 52:55 – Santala (Fuglebrg, A. Uronen) (PP) |
| | 1–6 | 53:44 – Pakarinen (Laatikainen, Vuori) (PP) |

10 min
Penalties
29 min
15
Shots
33

| 22 April 2026; 18:00 | Canada | 1–2 (0–0, 1–1, 0–1) | Slovakia | Pavol Demitra Ice Stadium, Trenčín; Attendance: 6,012 |

Game reference

Gavin Betts
Goalies
Denis Čelko
Referees:
(United States) Samuel Heidemann
(Sweden) Johan Wedin
Linesmen:
(United Kingdom) Ryan Fraley
(Sweden) Teodor Sörholm

| | 0–1 | 31:50 – Šramatý (Jakubec, Bernát) (PP) |
| Preston (Valentini, Lawrence) (PP) – 34:15 | 1–1 |
| | 1–2 | 48:43 – Kazda (PS) |

2 min
Penalties
4 min
26
Shots
21

| 23 April 2026; 14:00 | Canada | 6–0 (2–0, 1–0, 3–0) | Latvia | Pavol Demitra Ice Stadium, Trenčín; Attendance: 627 |

Game reference

Carter Esler
Goalies
Iļja Ņikitins
Referees:
(Slovakia) Filip Crman
(Hungary) Gergely Gebei
Linesmen:
(Czech Republic) Stanislav Hnát
(United States) Quinn Schafer

| Vandenberg – 00:52 | 1–0 |
| Lawrence (Zhilkin) – 12:59 | 2–0 |
| Valentini – 21:22 | 3–0 |
| Zhilkin (Valentini, Lin) (PP) – 48:13 | 4–0 |
| Eshkawkogan (Hicks, Di Iorio) – 57:05 | 5–0 |
| Olsen (Ambrosio, Rousseau) – 59:45 | 6–0 |

4 min
Penalties
8 min
48
Shots
19

| 23 April 2026; 18:00 | Slovakia | 6–1 (2–0, 1–1, 3–0) | Norway | Pavol Demitra Ice Stadium, Trenčín; Attendance: 3,659 |

Game reference

Samuel Hrenák
Goalies
Maximillian Aas
Referees:
(United States) Samuel Heidemann
(Czech Republic) Luděk Pilný
Linesmen:
(Germany) Vincent Brüggemann
(Italy) Daniel Rigoni
(United States) Quinn Schafer

| Floriš (Jakubec, Botka) – 01:49 | 1–0 |
| Selič (Bereš) – 06:55 | 2–0 |
| | 2–1 | 25:35 – Jones-Nilsson (Kjølmoen, Dimitriev-Jensen) |
| Jakubec (Šramatý) – 37:40 | 3–1 |
| Matta (Goljer, Kazda) – 44:55 | 4–1 |
| Šimko (Válek, Bernát) (PP) – 45:42 | 5–1 |
| Selič (Goljer, Požgay) – 52:26 | 6–1 |

6 min
Penalties
8 min
40
Shots
22

| 24 April 2026; 18:00 | Finland | 2–0 (1–0, 1–0, 0–0) | Latvia | Pavol Demitra Ice Stadium, Trenčín; Attendance: 1,167 |

Game reference
| Pyry Lammi | Goalies | Patriks Plūmiņš | Referees: (Switzerland) Phillip Ströbel (Sweden) Johan Wedin; Linesmen: (Germany) Vincent Brüggemann (United Kingdom) Ryan Fraley |
| Kuukasjärvi (E. Uronen) – 13:27 / 1–0; Santala (Alalauri) (PP) – 32:30 / 2–0 | | | Referees: (Switzerland) Phillip Ströbel (Sweden) Johan Wedin; Linesmen: (Germany) Vincent Brüggemann (United Kingdom) Ryan Fraley |
| 6 min | Penalties | 18 min | Referees: (Switzerland) Phillip Ströbel (Sweden) Johan Wedin; Linesmen: (Germany) Vincent Brüggemann (United Kingdom) Ryan Fraley |
| 35 | Shots | 14 | Referees: (Switzerland) Phillip Ströbel (Sweden) Johan Wedin; Linesmen: (Germany) Vincent Brüggemann (United Kingdom) Ryan Fraley |

| 25 April 2026; 14:00 | Norway | 0–8 (0–3, 0–3, 0–2) | Canada | Pavol Demitra Ice Stadium, Trenčín; Attendance: 1,710 |

Game reference

Felix Timraz-Westin
Olivers Freimanis
Goalies
Gavin Betts
Referees:
(United States) Samuel Heidemann
(Switzerland) Phillip Ströbel
Linesmen:
(Germany) Vincent Brüggemann
(Sweden) Teodor Sörholm

| 0–1 | 09:55 – Hamilton (Lin, Di Iorio) |
| 0–2 | 16:49 – Zhilkin (Preston, Lin) (PP) |
| 0–3 | 19:30 – Lawrence (Zhilkin, Preston) (PP) |
| 0–4 | 21:49 – Jacobson (Verhoeff, Croskery) |
| 0–5 | 28:39 – Zhilkin (Lawrence, Lemieux) |
| 0–6 | 37:31 – Zhilkin (Ambrosio, Lawrence) |
| 0–7 | 44:34 – Jacobson (Dagenais, Eshkawkogan) (PP) |
| 0–8 | 54:21 – Olsen |

12 min
Penalties
2 min
12
Shots
66

| 25 April 2026; 18:00 | Slovakia | 4–5 OT (1–0, 3–3, 0–1); OT: (0–1) | Finland | Pavol Demitra Ice Stadium, Trenčín; Attendance: 6,059 |

Game reference

Denis Čelko
Goalies
Oskari Ahmajärvi
Referees:
(Hungary) Gergely Gebei
(Czech Republic) Luděk Pilný
Linesmen:
(Italy) Daniel Rigoni
(United States) Quinn Schafer

| Kazda (Šimko) – 18:03 | 1–0 |
| | 1–1 | 23:17 – Mäkinen (Miilunpohja, Alalauri) |
| | 1–2 | 25:57 – Mäkinen (Pakarinen) |
| Kazda (Šimko) – 30:55 | 2–2 |
| | 2–3 | 34:43 – Vanhatalo (Suvanto) |
| Hybský (Floriš, Potočka) – 35:32 | 3–3 |
| Šramatý – 36:55 | 4–3 |
| | 4–4 | 55:09 – Alalauri (Laitinen) |
| | 4–5 | 61:50 – Suvanto (Santala, Alalauri) |

6 min
Penalties
2 min
28
Shots
18

| 26 April 2026; 18:00 | Latvia | 8–1 (2–0, 3–0, 3–1) | Norway | Pavol Demitra Ice Stadium, Trenčín; Attendance: 434 |

Game reference

Patriks Plūmiņš
Goalies
Maximillian Aas
Felix Timraz-Westin
Referees:
(Slovakia) Filip Crman
(Sweden) Johan Wedin
Linesmen:
(United Kingdom) Ryan Fraley
(Czech Republic) Stanislav Hnát

| Avotiņš (Mūrnieks) – 11:37 | 1–0 |
| Tarvids (Upenieks, Lūks) – 11:58 | 2–0 |
| Avotiņš (Rots) (SH) – 23:34 | 3–0 |
| Klaucāns (Mūrnieks, Lisovskis) (PP) – 25:51 | 4–0 |
| Klaucāns (Obuks, Kļaviņš) – 34:54 | 5–0 |
| Rots (SH) – 42:32 | 6–0 |
| | 6–1 | 53:15 – Gulbrandsen (Sivertsen Andresen, Juntti) |
| Mūrnieks (Reidzāns, Avotiņš) – 56:00 | 7–1 |
| Lūks (Kļaviņš, Klaucāns) – 56:52 | 8–1 |

10 min
Penalties
6 min
37
Shots
25

| 27 April 2026; 14:00 | Finland | 0–7 (0–4, 0–0, 0–3) | Canada | Pavol Demitra Ice Stadium, Trenčín; Attendance: 1,432 |

Game reference

Pyry Lammi
Oskari Ahmajärvi
Goalies
Gavin Betts
Referees:
(Hungary) Gergely Gebei
(United States) Samuel Heidemann
Linesmen:
(United States) Quinn Schafer
(Sweden) Teodor Sörholm

| 0–1 | 02:08 – Valentini (Verhoeff, Lin) |
| 0–2 | 11:07 – Hamilton (Croskery) |
| 0–3 | 16:22 – Preston (Croskery) |
| 0–4 | 18:21 – Hamilton (Lin) |
| 0–5 | 42:59 – Preston (Verhoeff, Vandenberg) |
| 0–6 | 44:58 – Zhilkin (Lemieux) |
| 0–7 | 48:08 – Lin (Cali, Di Iorio) |

2 min
Penalties
4 min
19
Shots
30

| 27 April 2026; 18:00 | Latvia | 2–5 (1–2, 0–0, 1–3) | Slovakia | Pavol Demitra Ice Stadium, Trenčín; Attendance: 4,727 |

Game reference

Iļja Ņikitins
Goalies
Samuel Hrenák
Referees:
(Czech Republic) Luděk Pilný
(Switzerland) Phillip Ströbel
Linesmen:
(Germany) Vincent Brüggemann
(Italy) Daniel Rigoni

| | 0–1 | 04:35 – Bernát (Botka) (PP2) |
| | 0–2 | 05:33 – Goljer (Šramatý, Matta) (PP) |
| Obuks (Mūrnieks, Reidzāns) – 19:09 | 1–2 |
| | 1–3 | 41:18 – Goljer (Šramatý, Kazda) (PP) |
| | 1–4 | 45:07 – Kazda (Matta, Šramatý) (PP) |
| Rots (Upenieks) – 57:58 | 2–4 |
| | 2–5 | 58:50 – Brath (Potočka) (EN) |

12 min
Penalties
6 min
23
Shots
40

==== Group B ====
| Pos | Team | Pld | W | OTW | OTL | L | GF | GA | GD | Pts | Qualification |
|---|---|---|---|---|---|---|---|---|---|---|---|
| 1 | United States | 4 | 3 | 0 | 1 | 0 | 24 | 6 | +18 | 10 | Quarterfinals |
| 2 | Czechia | 4 | 2 | 1 | 1 | 0 | 16 | 7 | +9 | 9 | Quarterfinals |
| 3 | Sweden | 4 | 2 | 0 | 0 | 2 | 19 | 14 | +5 | 6 | Quarterfinals |
| 4 | Denmark | 4 | 1 | 0 | 0 | 3 | 6 | 22 | −16 | 3 | Quarterfinals |
| 5 | Germany | 4 | 0 | 1 | 0 | 3 | 8 | 24 | −16 | 2 | Relegation round |

Source: IIHF

| 22 April 2026; 12:00 | Germany | 2–7 (0–1, 0–4, 2–2) | Sweden | Ice Hockey Arena Ružinov, Bratislava; Attendance: 993 |

Game reference

Niclas Wolter
Goalies
Kevin Törnblom
Referees:
(Netherlands) Jeroen Klijberg
(Slovakia) Marek Žák
Linesmen:
(Slovakia) Peter Jedlička
(United States) Tyler Willie

| | 0–1 | 09:20 – Kim (Karlsson, A. Andersson) |
| | 0–2 | 23:52 – Zirath (Command, Gudmundsson) |
| | 0–3 | 24:12 – Nömme (Meijer, Hermansson) |
| | 0–4 | 30:25 – Meijer (SH) |
| | 0–5 | 33:30 – Bartholdsson (Sörensson, Isaksson) |
| | 0–6 | 44:35 – Sörensson (Isaksson, Palme) |
| | 0–7 | 48:12 – Cilthe (Palme, A. Andersson) |
| Bloch (Schwarz, Lell) (PP) – 50:18 | 1–7 |
| Krestan (Calce, Hartmann) – 53:52 | 2–7 |

10 min
Penalties
14 min
23
Shots
42

| 22 April 2026; 16:00 | Czechia | 3–2 OT (0–0, 1–2, 1–0); OT: (1–0) | United States | Ice Hockey Arena Ružinov, Bratislava; Attendance: 2,200 |

Game reference

Marek Sklenička
Goalies
Brady Knowling
Referees:
(Canada) Chad Ingalls
(Austria) Christoph Sternat
Linesmen:
(Germany) Kenneth Englisch
(Canada) Spencer Knox

| Hartl (Klaus, Kamas) – 23:49 | 1–0 |
| | 1–1 | 27:12 – Zajic (Rogowski, Meyer) |
| | 1–2 | 28:17 – Cullen (Berchild) |
| Hora (Huk, Tománek) – 43:35 | 2–2 |
| Řípa – 64:48 | 3–2 |

6 min
Penalties
6 min
29
Shots
30

| 23 April 2026; 12:00 | Denmark | 4–1 (1–1, 1–0, 2–0) | Germany | Ice Hockey Arena Ružinov, Bratislava; Attendance: 941 |

Game reference

Anton Wilde Larsen
Goalies
Niclas Wolter
Referees:
(Netherlands) Jeroen Klijberg
(Canada) Chad Ingalls
Linesmen:
(Slovakia) Peter Jedlička
(Switzerland) Aurélien Urfer

| | 0–1 | 03:30 – Hartmann (Calce) |
| Althof (Heinsen, True) – 17:22 | 1–1 |
| Kloeve (Jakobsen, Schioldan) (PP) – 26:20 | 2–1 |
| Kloeve (Kjelgaard) (EN) – 57:58 | 3–1 |
| Lepola (EN) – 59:49 | 4–1 |

4 min
Penalties
10 min
19
Shots
32

| 23 April 2026; 16:00 | Sweden | 1–2 (0–0, 0–1, 1–1) | Czechia | Ice Hockey Arena Ružinov, Bratislava; Attendance: 1,444 |

Game reference

Kevin Törnblom
Goalies
Martin Psohlavec
Referees:
(Finland) Toni Hyvärinen
(Canada) Tyson Stewart
Linesmen:
(Canada) Spencer Knox
(United States) Tyler Willie

| | 0–1 | 25:22 – Klaus (Řípa, Řehák) |
| Nordmark (Hermansson, Olofsson) (PP) – 50:35 | 1–1 |
| | 1–2 | 59:39 – Vaněček (Tomek, Ruml) (PP) |

6 min
Penalties
2 min
19
Shots
28

| 24 April 2026; 16:00 | United States | 2–0 (0–0, 1–0, 1–0) | Denmark | Ice Hockey Arena Ružinov, Bratislava; Attendance: 1,412 |

Game reference
| Luke Carrithers | Goalies | Anton Wilde Larsen | Referees: (Austria) Christoph Sternat (Slovakia) Marek Žák; Linesmen: (Finland) Teo Mäkinen (Switzerland) Aurélien Urfer |
| Berchild (Cullen, Francisco) (PP) – 26:29 / 1–0; Beuker (Plante) (PP) – 56:43 / 2–0 | | | Referees: (Austria) Christoph Sternat (Slovakia) Marek Žák; Linesmen: (Finland) Teo Mäkinen (Switzerland) Aurélien Urfer |
| 10 min | Penalties | 12 min | Referees: (Austria) Christoph Sternat (Slovakia) Marek Žák; Linesmen: (Finland) Teo Mäkinen (Switzerland) Aurélien Urfer |
| 54 | Shots | 9 | Referees: (Austria) Christoph Sternat (Slovakia) Marek Žák; Linesmen: (Finland) Teo Mäkinen (Switzerland) Aurélien Urfer |

| 25 April 2026; 12:00 | Germany | 3–2 OT (1–1, 0–1, 1–0); OT: (1–0) | Czechia | Ice Hockey Arena Ružinov, Bratislava; Attendance: 1,698 |

Game reference

Max Bolle
Goalies
Marek Sklenička
Referees:
(Finland) Toni Hyvärinen
(Canada) Tyson Stewart
Linesmen:
(Slovakia) Peter Jedlička
(Canada) Spencer Knox

| | 0–1 | 01:44 – Vaněček (Ruml, Tomek) (PP) |
| Schwarz – 09:14 | 1–1 |
| | 1–2 | 35:53 – Šichtař (Hartl, Byrtus) |
| Bloch (Rolsing, Schwarz) (EA) – 59:33 | 2–2 |
| Krestan (PS) – 64:05 | 3–2 |

8 min
Penalties
8 min
24
Shots
42

| 25 April 2026; 16:00 | Sweden | 1–9 (0–4, 1–2, 0–3) | United States | Ice Hockey Arena Ružinov, Bratislava; Attendance: 2,425 |

Game reference

Kevin Törnblom
Viggo Tamm
Goalies
Brady Knowling
Referees:
(Canada) Chad Ingalls
(Netherlands) Jeroen Klijberg
Linesmen:
(Germany) Kenneth Englisch
(Finland) Teo Mäkinen

| | 0–1 | 04:46 – Gutierrez (Beuker, Cullen) |
| | 0–2 | 07:49 – Beuker (Plante) |
| | 0–3 | 17:43 – Mutryn (Cullen, Francisco) (PP) |
| | 0–4 | 18:25 – Nelson (Trottier, Barnett) |
| | 0–5 | 26:36 – Lutner (Meyer, Martyniuk) |
| Gustafsson (Command, L. Andersson) (PP) – 31:02 | 1–5 |
| | 1–6 | 39:45 – Bogas (Nelson) (SH) |
| | 1–7 | 41:50 – Berchild (Mutryn, Cullen) |
| | 1–8 | 45:37 – Meyer (Rogowski, Zajic) |
| | 1–9 | 48:07 – Stuart (Glance, Schairer) (PP) |

16 min
Penalties
10 min
19
Shots
27

| 26 April 2026; 16:00 | Czechia | 9–1 (2–1, 3–0, 4–0) | Denmark | Ice Hockey Arena Ružinov, Bratislava; Attendance: 1,635 |

Game reference

Martin Psohlavec
Goalies
Daniel Navrbjerg
Victor Damgaard
Referees:
(Austria) Christoph Sternat
(Canada) Chad Ingalls
(Canada) Tyson Stewart
Linesmen:
(Germany) Kenneth Englisch
(United States) Tyler Willie

| Šebesta (Řípa, Nedorost) – 04:35 | 1–0 |
| Huk (Ruml, Nedorost) – 10:28 | 2–0 |
| | 2–1 | 11:15 – Althof (Degn, Heinsen) |
| Sedláček (Byrtus, Cífka) – 23:00 | 3–1 |
| Holejšovský (Ruml, Nedorost) – 29:14 | 4–1 |
| Sedláček (Huk) – 36:45 | 5–1 |
| Řípa (Nedorost, Řehák) – 40:44 | 6–1 |
| Nedorost (Hora, Řípa) – 43:56 | 7–1 |
| Tománek (Tomek) – 53:47 | 8–1 |
| Šebesta (Tomek) – 57:43 | 9–1 |

2 min
Penalties
4 min
40
Shots
10

| 27 April 2026; 12:00 | Denmark | 1–10 (1–4, 0–2, 0–4) | Sweden | Ice Hockey Arena Ružinov, Bratislava; Attendance: 876 |

Game reference

Anton Wilde Larsen
Victor Damgaard
Goalies
Kevin Törnblom
Referees:
(Canada) Chad Ingalls
(Slovakia) Marek Žák
Linesmen:
(Slovakia) Peter Jedlička
(Finland) Teo Mäkinen

| | 0–1 | 00:32 – Hermansson (Command) |
| | 0–2 | 00:59 – Bartholdsson |
| | 0–3 | 10:45 – Command (Hermansson, Gudmundsson) (EA) |
| | 0–4 | 11:54 – Sörensson (Palme, Cilthe) |
| Hulsig – 19:40 | 1–4 |
| | 1–5 | 21:39 – Kim (Elofsson, Nömme) |
| | 1–6 | 30:02 – Meijer (Zirath) (SH) |
| | 1–7 | 43:54 – Hermansson (Nordmark, Bratt) |
| | 1–8 | 47:00 – Command (Hermansson, Gustafsson) |
| | 1–9 | 48:50 – Nordmark (Hermansson, Gudmundsson) |
| | 1–10 | 51:17 – Nordmark (Gustafsson, Hermansson) (PP) |

6 min
Penalties
10 min
7
Shots
39

| 27 April 2026; 16:00 | United States | 11–2 (6–1, 3–0, 2–1) | Germany | Ice Hockey Arena Ružinov, Bratislava; Attendance: 1,214 |

Game reference

Luke Carrithers
Goalies
Max Bolle
Niclas Wolter
Referees:
(Finland) Toni Hyvärinen
(Netherlands) Jeroen Klijberg
Linesmen:
(Canada) Spencer Knox
(Switzerland) Aurélien Urfer

| Glance (Plante, Lutner) – 01:25 | 1–0 |
| Cullen (Glance, Mutryn) (PP) – 02:09 | 2–0 |
| | 2–1 | 09:38 – Krestan (Gerhofer, Steinhauser) (PP) |
| Berchild (Cullen, Beuker) – 10:27 | 3–1 |
| Nelson (Schairer, Plante) (PP) – 12:24 | 4–1 |
| Zajic (Fitzhenry, Rogowski) – 13:03 | 5–1 |
| Cullen (Glance, Martyniuk) – 19:29 | 6–1 |
| Mutryn (Berchild, Glance) (PP) – 21:52 | 7–1 |
| Nelson (Meyer, Schairer) – 27:49 | 8–1 |
| Zajic – 30:05 | 9–1 |
| Berchild (Francisco, Martyniuk) – 43:28 | 10–1 |
| | 10–2 | 46:46 – Becker (Rolsing, Schwarz) (PP) |
| Zajic (Meyer) – 55:55 | 11–2 |

14 min
Penalties
20 min
53
Shots
26

=== Relegation round ===
| 29 April 2026; 10:00 | Germany | 3–4 (0–1, 1–1, 2–2) | Norway | Pavol Demitra Ice Stadium, Trenčín; Attendance: 534 |

Game reference

Niclas Wolter
Goalies
Felix Timraz-Westin
Maximillian Aas
Referees:
(Slovakia) Filip Crman
(Hungary) Gergely Gebei
Linesmen:
(United Kingdom) Ryan Fraley
(United States) Quinn Schafer

| | 0–1 | 13:50 – Sæter |
| | 0–2 | 20:28 – Aaram Olsen (Haglund, Tollefsen) |
| Calce (Hartmann, Krestan) – 26:12 | 1–2 |
| Calce (Hartmann) – 42:56 | 2–2 |
| Becker (Schwarz) – 53:58 | 3–2 |
| | 3–3 | 58:45 – Aaram Olsen (Jones-Nilsson, Sivertsen Andresen) (PP2, EA) |
| | 3–4 | 59:37 – Aaram Olsen (Sivertsen Andresen) |

10 min
Penalties
10 min
33
Shots
26

=== Playoff round ===
Winning teams in the quarterfinals will be reseeded according to their ranking:

1. higher position in the group
2. higher number of points
3. better goal difference
4. higher number of goals scored for
5. better seeding coming into the tournament (final placement at the 2025 IIHF World U18 Championships).

| Rank | Team | Group | Pos | Pts | GD | GF | Seed |
|---|---|---|---|---|---|---|---|
| 1 | United States | B | 1 | 10 | +18 | 24 | 3 |
| 2 | Slovakia | A | 1 | 10 | +8 | 17 | 4 |
| 3 | Canada | A | 2 | 9 | +20 | 22 | 1 |
| 4 | Czechia | B | 2 | 9 | +9 | 16 | 7 |
| 5 | Finland | A | 3 | 8 | +1 | 13 | 5 |
| 6 | Sweden | B | 3 | 6 | +5 | 19 | 2 |
| 7 | Latvia | A | 4 | 3 | −4 | 10 | 8 |
| 8 | Denmark | B | 4 | 3 | −16 | 6 | 10 |

==== Bracket ====
Quarterfinals
29 April – Trenčín
1A Slovakia | 7
4B Denmark | 1
29 April – Bratislava
1B United States | 2
4A Latvia | 5
29 April – Bratislava
2B Czechia | 2
3A Finland | 1
29 April – Trenčín
2A Canada | 2
3B Sweden | 4

Semifinals
1 May – Trenčín
2 Slovakia | 1
7 Latvia | 0
1 May – Trenčín
4 Czechia | 3
6 Sweden (OT) | 4

Final
2 May – Trenčín
2 Slovakia | 2
6 Sweden | 4
Third place
2 May – Trenčín
4 Czechia | 4
7 Latvia | 1

==== Quarterfinals ====
| 29 April 2026; 12:00 | Czechia | 2–1 (1–0, 1–1, 0–0) | Finland | Ice Hockey Arena Ružinov, Bratislava; Attendance: 1,299 |

Game reference

Martin Psohlavec
Goalies
Oskari Ahmajärvi
Referees:
(Canada) Chad Ingalls
(Canada) Tyson Stewart
Linesmen:
(Switzerland) Aurélien Urfer
(United States) Tyler Willie

| Klaus (Řípa, Řehák) – 07:09 | 1–0 |
| | 1–1 | 24:56 – Fugleberg (Suvanto) (PP) |
| Cífka (Řípa, Klaus) – 39:05 | 2–1 |

4 min
Penalties
2 min
19
Shots
36

| 29 April 2026; 14:00 | Canada | 2–4 (0–2, 2–0, 0–2) | Sweden | Pavol Demitra Ice Stadium, Trenčín; Attendance: 696 |

Game reference

Gavin Betts
Goalies
Kevin Törnblom
Referees:
(United States) Samuel Heidemann
(Czech Republic) Luděk Pilný
Linesmen:
(Germany) Vincent Brüggemann
(Czech Republic) Stanislav Hnát
(United States) Quinn Schafer

| | 0–1 | 02:09 – Karlsson (Nömme, Elofsson) |
| | 0–2 | 15:11 – L. Andersson (A. Andersson) |
| Dagenais (Preston, Jacobson) – 24:04 | 1–2 |
| Croskery (Lawrence) – 39:59 | 2–2 |
| | 2–3 | 52:37 – Bartholdsson (Hermansson, Gustafsson) (PP) |
| | 2–4 | 58:29 – Bartholdsson (EN) |

4 min
Penalties
6 min
35
Shots
26

| 29 April 2026; 16:00 | United States | 2–5 (0–1, 0–1, 2–3) | Latvia | Ice Hockey Arena Ružinov, Bratislava; Attendance: 858 |

Game reference

Brady Knowling
Goalies
Patriks Plūmiņš
Referees:
(Netherlands) Jeroen Klijberg
(Slovakia) Marek Žák
Linesmen:
(Germany) Kenneth Englisch
(Slovakia) Peter Jedlička

| | 0–1 | 09:48 – Klaucāns (Rutkis) |
| | 0–2 | 27:55 – Rutkis (Mūrnieks) (PP) |
| Zajic (Beuker) – 48:39 | 1–2 |
| | 1–3 | 50:20 – Avotiņš (Laganovskis, Mūrnieks) |
| | 1–4 | 55:45 – Klaucāns (Lisovskis) (EN) |
| Plante (Cullen, Mutryn) (EA) – 56:34 | 2–4 |
| | 2–5 | 59:11 – Reidzāns (Erdmanis-Hermanis) (EN) |

10 min
Penalties
6 min
45
Shots
16

| 29 April 2026; 18:00 | Slovakia | 7–1 (5–1, 1–0, 1–0) | Denmark | Pavol Demitra Ice Stadium, Trenčín; Attendance: 6,009 |

Game reference

Samuel Hrenák
Goalies
Anton Wilde Larsen
Referees:
(Switzerland) Phillip Ströbel
(Sweden) Johan Wedin
Linesmen:
(Italy) Daniel Rigoni
(Sweden) Teodor Sörholm

| Floriš (Botka, Ozogány) – 06:51 | 1–0 |
| Matta (Kazda, Kovalčík) – 07:49 | 2–0 |
| Selič (Matta, Kazda) (PP) – 08:21 | 3–0 |
| Kazda (Selič) – 09:17 | 4–0 |
| | 4–1 | 13:18 – Hulsig |
| Karšay (Bernát, Goljer) – 14:16 | 5–1 |
| Potočka (Hybský) – 34:39 | 6–1 |
| Kazda (Požgay, Šimko) – 43:19 | 7–1 |

6 min
Penalties
6 min
34
Shots
9

==== Semifinals ====
| 1 May 2026; 15:00 | Slovakia | 1–0 (0–0, 1–0, 0–0) | Latvia | Pavol Demitra Ice Stadium, Trenčín; Attendance: 6,059 |

Game reference
| Samuel Hrenák | Goalies | Patriks Plūmiņš | Referees: (Finland) Toni Hyvärinen (Czech Republic) Luděk Pilný; Linesmen: (Czech Republic) Stanislav Hnát (Finland) Teo Mäkinen |
| Jakubec (Botka, Selič) – 39:43 / 1–0 | | | Referees: (Finland) Toni Hyvärinen (Czech Republic) Luděk Pilný; Linesmen: (Czech Republic) Stanislav Hnát (Finland) Teo Mäkinen |
| 27 min | Penalties | 27 min | Referees: (Finland) Toni Hyvärinen (Czech Republic) Luděk Pilný; Linesmen: (Czech Republic) Stanislav Hnát (Finland) Teo Mäkinen |
| 22 | Shots | 14 | Referees: (Finland) Toni Hyvärinen (Czech Republic) Luděk Pilný; Linesmen: (Czech Republic) Stanislav Hnát (Finland) Teo Mäkinen |

| 1 May 2026; 19:00 | Czechia | 3–4 OT (2–1, 1–1, 0–1); OT: (0–1) | Sweden | Pavol Demitra Ice Stadium, Trenčín; Attendance: 4,435 |

Game reference

Martin Psohlavec
Goalies
Kevin Törnblom
Referees:
(Canada) Tyson Stewart
(Switzerland) Phillip Ströbel
Linesmen:
(Canada) Spencer Knox
(Switzerland) Aurélien Urfer

| Tomek (Tománek, Cífka) – 07:57 | 1–0 |
| | 1–1 | 11:51 – Hermansson (Command) |
| Tománek (Vaněček, Ruml) (PP) – 14:45 | 2–1 |
| Vaněček (Tomek) (PP2) – 20:45 | 3–1 |
| | 3–2 | 27:19 – Command (Zirath) |
| | 3–3 | 43:20 – Sörensson (Gudmundsson, Meijer) |
| | 3–4 | 69:18 – Meijer (Hermansson, Gustafsson) |

10 min
Penalties
12 min
38
Shots
30

==== Bronze medal game ====
| 2 May 2026; 15:00 | Czechia | 4–1 (2–1, 0–0, 2–0) | Latvia | Pavol Demitra Ice Stadium, Trenčín; Attendance: 2,932 |

Game reference

Marek Sklenička
Goalies
Patriks Plūmiņš
Referees:
(Finland) Toni Hyvärinen
(Sweden) Johan Wedin
Linesmen:
(United States) Quinn Schafer
(Sweden) Teodor Sörholm

| | 0–1 | 11:23 – Klaucāns (Rutkis) |
| Tománek (Michálek, Byrtus) – 14:26 | 1–1 |
| Huk (Tománek, Ruml) (PP) – 15:06 | 2–1 |
| Huk (Řípa) (EN) – 59:32 | 3–1 |
| Katolický (Vaněček) (EN) – 59:57 | 4–1 |

8 min
Penalties
8 min
26
Shots
22

==== Gold medal game ====
| 2 May 2026; 19:00 | Slovakia | 2–4 (0–1, 0–1, 2–2) | Sweden | Pavol Demitra Ice Stadium, Trenčín; Attendance: 6,059 |

Game reference

Samuel Hrenák
Goalies
Kevin Törnblom
Referees:
(United States) Samuel Heidemann
(Canada) Chad Ingalls
Linesmen:
(Canada) Spencer Knox
(Switzerland) Aurélien Urfer

| | 0–1 | 05:53 – Sörensson (Palme, Cilthe) |
| | 0–2 | 37:42 – Hermansson (Elofsson, Meijer) |
| | 0–3 | 50:32 – A. Andersson (Cilthe, Zirath) |
| | 0–4 | 54:34 – Palme (Meijer, Sörensson) |
| Matta (Kazda, Floriš) (EA) – 55:40 | 1–4 |
| Šimko (Selič, Kazda) (EA) – 56:43 | 2–4 |

6 min
Penalties
24 min
28
Shots
39

=== Final standings ===
| Pos | Grp | Team | Pld | W | OTW | OTL | L | GF | GA | GD | Pts | Final Result |
|---|---|---|---|---|---|---|---|---|---|---|---|---|
| 1 | B | Sweden | 7 | 4 | 1 | 0 | 2 | 31 | 21 | +10 | 14 | Champions |
| 2 | A | Slovakia (H) | 7 | 5 | 0 | 1 | 1 | 27 | 14 | +13 | 16 | Runners-up |
| 3 | B | Czechia | 7 | 4 | 1 | 2 | 0 | 25 | 13 | +12 | 16 | Third place |
| 4 | A | Latvia | 7 | 2 | 0 | 0 | 5 | 16 | 21 | −5 | 6 | Fourth place |
| 5 | B | United States | 5 | 3 | 0 | 1 | 1 | 26 | 11 | +15 | 10 | Eliminated in Quarterfinals |
| 6 | A | Canada | 5 | 3 | 0 | 0 | 2 | 24 | 6 | +18 | 9 | Eliminated in Quarterfinals |
| 7 | A | Finland | 5 | 2 | 1 | 0 | 2 | 14 | 14 | 0 | 8 | Eliminated in Quarterfinals |
| 8 | B | Denmark | 5 | 1 | 0 | 0 | 4 | 7 | 29 | −22 | 3 | Eliminated in Quarterfinals |
| 9 | A | Norway | 5 | 1 | 0 | 0 | 4 | 7 | 31 | −24 | 3 | Avoided relegation |
| 10 | B | Germany | 5 | 0 | 1 | 0 | 4 | 11 | 28 | −17 | 2 | Relegated to the 2027 Division I A |

Source: IIHF
(H) Host

=== Awards and statistics ===
==== Awards ====
- Best players selected by the directorate:
  - Best Goaltender: (Latvia) Patriks Plūmiņš
  - Best Defenceman: (Slovakia) Adam Goljer
  - Best Forward: (Sweden) Elton Hermansson

- Media All-Stars:
  - MVP: (Slovakia) Timothy Kazda
  - Goaltender: (Latvia) Patriks Plūmiņš
  - Defencemen: (Slovakia) Adam Goljer / (Sweden) Malte Gustafsson
  - Forwards: (Slovakia) Timothy Kazda / (Sweden) Elton Hermansson / (United States) Wyatt Cullen

=== Statistics ===
==== Scoring leaders ====
| Pos | Player | Country | GP | G | A | Pts | +/− | PIM |
|---|---|---|---|---|---|---|---|---|
| 1 | Timothy Kazda | Slovakia | 7 | 6 | 6 | 12 | +5 | 0 |
| 2 | Elton Hermansson | Sweden | 7 | 4 | 8 | 12 | +5 | 6 |
| 3 | Wyatt Cullen | United States | 5 | 3 | 6 | 9 | +3 | 6 |
| 4 | Bosse Meijer | Sweden | 7 | 3 | 5 | 8 | +6 | 0 |
| 5 | Dominik Řípa | Czechia | 7 | 2 | 6 | 8 | +8 | 2 |
| 6 | Dima Zhilkin | Canada | 5 | 5 | 2 | 7 | +3 | 0 |
| 7 | Alexander Command | Sweden | 7 | 3 | 4 | 7 | +4 | 4 |
| 8 | Lukas Zajic | United States | 5 | 5 | 1 | 6 | +6 | 0 |
| 9 | Martins Klaucans | Latvia | 7 | 5 | 1 | 6 | 0 | 6 |
| 10 | Mikey Berchild | United States | 5 | 4 | 2 | 6 | +3 | 0 |
| 10 | Luca Santala | Finland | 5 | 4 | 2 | 6 | +1 | 0 |

GP = Games played; G = Goals; A = Assists; Pts = Points; +/− = Plus–minus; PIM = Penalties In Minutes
Source: IIHF

==== Goaltending leaders ====
(minimum 40% team's total ice time)

| Pos | Player | Country | TOI | GA | GAA | SA | Sv% | SO |
|---|---|---|---|---|---|---|---|---|
| 1 | Gavin Betts | Canada | 223:19 | 4 | 1.07 | 75 | 94.67 | 2 |
| 2 | Patriks Plūmiņš | Latvia | 295:38 | 8 | 1.62 | 150 | 94.67 | 0 |
| 3 | Martin Psohlavec | Czechia | 249:18 | 7 | 1.68 | 95 | 92.63 | 0 |
| 4 | Samuel Hrenák | Slovakia | 296:44 | 8 | 1.62 | 107 | 92.52 | 1 |
| 5 | Marek Sklenicka | Czechia | 188:53 | 6 | 1.91 | 76 | 92.11 | 0 |

TOI = Time on ice (minutes:seconds); GA = Goals against; GAA = Goals against average; SA = Shots against; Sv% = Save percentage; SO = Shutouts
Source: IIHF

== Division I ==
=== Group A ===
The Division I Group A tournament was played in Krynica-Zdrój, Poland, from 18 to 24 April 2026.

| Pos | Team | Pld | W | OTW | OTL | L | GF | GA | GD | Pts | Promotion or relegation |
|---|---|---|---|---|---|---|---|---|---|---|---|
| 1 | Switzerland | 5 | 4 | 1 | 0 | 0 | 30 | 11 | +19 | 14 | |
| 2 | Kazakhstan | 5 | 3 | 1 | 0 | 1 | 25 | 12 | +13 | 11 | |
| 3 | Ukraine | 5 | 2 | 0 | 1 | 2 | 22 | 22 | 0 | 7 | |
| 4 | Hungary | 5 | 2 | 0 | 0 | 3 | 16 | 19 | −3 | 6 | |
| 5 | Slovenia | 5 | 1 | 0 | 1 | 3 | 14 | 23 | −9 | 4 | |
| 6 | Poland (H) | 5 | 1 | 0 | 0 | 4 | 10 | 30 | −20 | 3 | Relegated to the 2027 Division I B |

Source: IIHF
Rules for classification: 1) points; 2) head-to-head points; 3) head-to-head goal difference; 4) head-to-head number of goals scored; 5) result against closest best-ranked team outside tied teams; 6) result against second-best ranked team outside tied teams; 7) seeding before tournament.
(H) Host

=== Group B ===
The Division I Group B tournament was played in Tallinn, Estonia, from 25 April to 1 May 2026.

| Pos | Team | Pld | W | OTW | OTL | L | GF | GA | GD | Pts | Promotion or relegation |
|---|---|---|---|---|---|---|---|---|---|---|---|
| 1 | Austria | 5 | 3 | 1 | 0 | 1 | 20 | 12 | +8 | 11 | |
| 2 | Lithuania | 5 | 3 | 0 | 1 | 1 | 14 | 12 | +2 | 10 (Note: France 2–3 Lithuania) | |
| 3 | France | 5 | 3 | 0 | 1 | 1 | 15 | 9 | +6 | 10 | |
| 4 | Estonia (H) | 5 | 1 | 1 | 0 | 3 | 14 | 19 | −5 | 5 (Note: Estonia 3–1 Italy) | |
| 5 | Italy | 5 | 1 | 1 | 0 | 3 | 9 | 13 | −4 | 5 | |
| 6 | South Korea | 5 | 1 | 0 | 1 | 3 | 10 | 17 | −7 | 4 | Relegation to the 2027 Division II A |

Source: IIHF
Rules for classification: 1) points; 2) head-to-head points; 3) head-to-head goal difference; 4) head-to-head number of goals scored; 5) result against closest best-ranked team outside tied teams; 6) result against second-best ranked team outside tied teams; 7) seeding before tournament.
(H) Host

== Division II ==
=== Group A ===
The Division II Group A tournament was played in Târgu Secuiesc, Romania, from 12 to 18 April 2026.

| Pos | Team | Pld | W | OTW | OTL | L | GF | GA | GD | Pts | Promotion or relegation |
|---|---|---|---|---|---|---|---|---|---|---|---|
| 1 | Japan | 5 | 5 | 0 | 0 | 0 | 31 | 7 | +24 | 15 | |
| 2 | China | 5 | 4 | 0 | 0 | 1 | 11 | 5 | +6 | 12 | |
| 3 | Great Britain | 5 | 2 | 0 | 0 | 3 | 14 | 13 | +1 | 6 (Note: Great Britain 3 Pts, 0 GD, 7 GS; Romania 3 Pts, 0 GD, 7 GS; Croatia 3 Pts, 0 GD, 5 GS. Great Britain 5–4 Romania) | |
| 4 | Romania (H) | 5 | 2 | 0 | 0 | 3 | 11 | 20 | −9 | 6 | |
| 5 | Croatia | 5 | 2 | 0 | 0 | 3 | 13 | 19 | −6 | 6 | |
| 6 | Spain | 5 | 0 | 0 | 0 | 5 | 8 | 24 | −16 | 0 | Relegation to the 2027 Division II B |

Source: IIHF
Rules for classification: 1) points; 2) head-to-head points; 3) head-to-head goal difference; 4) head-to-head number of goals scored; 5) result against closest best-ranked team outside tied teams; 6) result against second-best ranked team outside tied teams; 7) seeding before tournament.
(H) Host

=== Group B ===
The Division II Group B tournament was played in Belgrade, Serbia, from 5 to 11 April 2026.

| Pos | Team | Pld | W | OTW | OTL | L | GF | GA | GD | Pts | Promotion or relegation |
|---|---|---|---|---|---|---|---|---|---|---|---|
| 1 | Netherlands | 5 | 3 | 1 | 0 | 1 | 22 | 16 | +6 | 11 | |
| 2 | Mexico | 5 | 2 | 1 | 1 | 1 | 16 | 13 | +3 | 9 (Note: Serbia 2–4 Mexico) | |
| 3 | Serbia (H) | 5 | 3 | 0 | 0 | 2 | 22 | 14 | +8 | 9 | |
| 4 | Australia | 5 | 2 | 1 | 0 | 2 | 19 | 19 | 0 | 8 | |
| 5 | Belgium | 5 | 1 | 0 | 2 | 2 | 13 | 23 | −10 | 5 | |
| 6 | Chinese Taipei | 5 | 1 | 0 | 0 | 4 | 12 | 19 | −7 | 3 | Relegation to the 2027 Division III A |

Source: IIHF
Rules for classification: 1) points; 2) head-to-head points; 3) head-to-head goal difference; 4) head-to-head number of goals scored; 5) result against closest best-ranked team outside tied teams; 6) result against second-best ranked team outside tied teams; 7) seeding before tournament.
(H) Host

== Division III ==
=== Group A ===
The Division III Group A tournament was played in Hong Kong, China, from 2 to 8 March 2026.

| Pos | Team | Pld | W | OTW | OTL | L | GF | GA | GD | Pts | Promotion or relegation |
|---|---|---|---|---|---|---|---|---|---|---|---|
| 1 | Uzbekistan | 5 | 4 | 1 | 0 | 0 | 37 | 16 | +21 | 14 | |
| 2 | Hong Kong (H) | 5 | 4 | 0 | 0 | 1 | 33 | 14 | +19 | 12 | |
| 3 | Israel | 5 | 3 | 0 | 0 | 2 | 30 | 23 | +7 | 9 | |
| 4 | Turkey | 5 | 2 | 0 | 1 | 2 | 29 | 25 | +4 | 7 | |
| 5 | Bulgaria | 5 | 1 | 0 | 0 | 4 | 15 | 32 | −17 | 3 | |
| 6 | New Zealand | 5 | 0 | 0 | 0 | 5 | 8 | 42 | −34 | 0 | Relegation to the 2027 Division III B |

Source: IIHF
Rules for classification: 1) points; 2) head-to-head points; 3) head-to-head goal difference; 4) head-to-head number of goals scored; 5) result against closest best-ranked team outside tied teams; 6) result against second-best ranked team outside tied teams; 7) seeding before tournament.
(H) Host

=== Group B ===
The Division III Group B tournament was played in Sarajevo, Bosnia and Herzegovina, from 13 to 19 February 2026.

| Pos | Team | Pld | W | OTW | OTL | L | GF | GA | GD | Pts | Qualification |
|---|---|---|---|---|---|---|---|---|---|---|---|
| 1 | Iceland | 3 | 2 | 0 | 0 | 1 | 19 | 6 | +13 | 6 | Semifinals |
| 2 | Bosnia and Herzegovina (H) | 3 | 1 | 1 | 0 | 1 | 13 | 18 | −5 | 5 | Semifinals |
| 3 | South Africa | 3 | 1 | 0 | 0 | 2 | 12 | 11 | +1 | 3 | Relegation round |

Source: IIHF
Rules for classification: 1) points; 2) goal difference; 3) total goals; 4) seeding before tournament.
(H) Host

| Pos | Team | Pld | W | OTW | OTL | L | GF | GA | GD | Pts | Qualification |
|---|---|---|---|---|---|---|---|---|---|---|---|
| 1 | Thailand | 3 | 3 | 0 | 0 | 0 | 20 | 7 | +13 | 9 | Semifinals |
| 2 | Turkmenistan | 3 | 1 | 0 | 0 | 2 | 5 | 11 | −6 | 3 | Semifinals |
| 3 | Luxembourg | 3 | 0 | 0 | 1 | 2 | 10 | 26 | −16 | 1 | Relegation round |

Source: IIHF
Rules for classification: 1) points; 2) goal difference; 3) total goals; 4) seeding before tournament.

| Pos | Team | Pld | W | OTW | OTL | L | GF | GA | GD | Pts | Promotion or relegation |
|---|---|---|---|---|---|---|---|---|---|---|---|
| 1 | Thailand | 5 | 4 | 1 | 0 | 0 | 38 | 10 | +28 | 14 | First place |
| 2 | Iceland | 5 | 3 | 0 | 1 | 1 | 30 | 12 | +18 | 10 | Second place |
| 3 | Bosnia and Herzegovina | 5 | 2 | 1 | 0 | 2 | 19 | 27 | −8 | 8 | Third place |
| 4 | Turkmenistan | 5 | 1 | 0 | 0 | 4 | 6 | 29 | −23 | 3 | Fourth place |
| 5 | South Africa | 5 | 2 | 0 | 0 | 3 | 24 | 19 | +5 | 6 | Fifth place |
| 6 | Luxembourg | 5 | 1 | 0 | 1 | 3 | 18 | 38 | −20 | 4 | Sixth place, possible relegation |

Source: IIHF
