= Maddox Dagenais =

Canadian ice hockey player (born 2008)

- Born: March 27, 2008 (age 18) Montreal, Quebec, Canada
- Height: 6 ft 4 in (193 cm)
- Weight: 196 lb (89 kg; 14 st 0 lb)
- Position: Centre
- Shoots: Left
- QMJHL team: Quebec Remparts
- NHL draft: 16th overall, 2026; St. Louis Blues

Maddox Dagenais (born March 27, 2008) is a Canadian ice hockey centre for the Quebec Remparts of the Quebec Maritimes Junior Hockey League (QMJHL). He was drafted 16th overall by the St. Louis Blues in the 2026 NHL entry draft.

== Playing career ==
From 2021 to 2022, Dagenais was a member of the Nord Sélects M15 program and posted 27 goals and 27 assists in 30 games. He then spent a season with the Greater Kingston Gaels U15 team. Dagenais played for the Quinte Red Devils AAA team in 2023–24, appearing in 35 games while recording 42 goals and 39 assists. After the season, he was selected first overall in the Quebec Maritimes Junior Hockey League (QMJHL) draft by the Quebec Remparts.

Dagenais scored 26 points in his first season with Quebec in 2024–25. The following season, he totaled 30 goals and 32 assists in 62 games. Dagenais was named the recipient of the Michael Bossy Trophy as the QMJHL's best professional prospect.

Dagenais was selected by the St. Louis Blues in the first round, 16th overall, of the 2026 NHL entry draft.

== International play ==
Dagenais competed for the Canada Red team at the 2024 World U-17 Hockey Challenge, posting a point in four games. He also posted two points in five games for Canada at the 2026 IIHF World U18 Championships.

== Personal life ==
Dagenais was born on March 27, 2008, in Montreal, Quebec. He is the son of former NHL player Pierre Dagenais, and they are the first father-son duo to both be selected first overall in QMJHL drafts. Dagenais attended Ecole Elementaire Catholique L'Envol in Trenton, Ontario.

Awards and achievements
| Preceded by Tynan Lawrence | St. Louis Blues first-round draft pick 2026 | Succeeded by Incumbent |
