= Zhilkin =

Zhilkin is a surname. Notable people with the surname include:

- Alexander Zhilkin (born 1959), Russian politician
- Andrey Zhilkin (born 1995), Russian swimmer
- Danil Zhilkin (born 2003), Russian ice hockey player
- Grigory Zhilkin (born 2003), Russian footballer
