= Tynan Lawrence =

Canadian ice hockey player (born 2008)

- Born: August 3, 2008 (age 18) Fredericton, New Brunswick, Canada
- Height: 6 ft 0 in (183 cm)
- Weight: 185 lb (84 kg; 13 st 3 lb)
- Position: Centre
- Shoots: Left
- NCAA team: Boston University Terriers
- NHL draft: 11th overall, 2026; St. Louis Blues

Tynan Lawrence (born August 3, 2008) is a Canadian college ice hockey player who is a centre for the Boston University Terriers of the National Collegiate Athletic Association (NCAA). He was drafted 11th overall by the St. Louis Blues in the 2026 NHL entry draft.

== Playing career ==
Lawrence played AAA-level ice hockey for the Fredericton Blues program. He scored four points in the 2020–21 season before posting 27 goals and 61 points for the Blues U15 "A" team during the 2021–22 season while playing in 27 games. In 2022, after graduating from the Fredericton program, he began attending Shattuck-Saint Mary's School in Faribault, Minnesota, U.S., known for its top hockey teams. Starting with the school's U14 team in 2022–23, he scored 93 points in 56 league games that season. Lawrence was then a member of Shattuck-Saint Mary's U16 team in 2023–24, recording 22 goals and 49 points in 50 games played. In August 2024, he announced his commitment to play college ice hockey for the Terriers of Boston University in Massachusetts.

Lawrence was selected by the Chicoutimi Saguenéens with the 10th overall pick of the 2024 Quebec Maritimes Junior Hockey League (QMJHL) draft. However, he instead decided to play for the Muskegon Lumberjacks of the United States Hockey League (USHL) for the 2024–25 season. Appearing in 56 games, he totalled 25 goals and 29 assists, leading the team with 54 points. Lawrence then appeared in 14 playoff games, scoring eight goals and 10 assists, and helped the Lumberjacks to the Clark Cup championship over the Waterloo Black Hawks, earning USHL playoff MVP honors.

Lawrence was regarded as a top prospect for the 2026 NHL entry draft. He was selected by the St. Louis Blues in the first round, 11th overall.

== International play ==
At age 15, Lawrence represented Canada in ice hockey at the 2024 Winter Youth Olympics in South Korea. He also competed for the gold medal-winning team at the 2024 World U-17 Hockey Challenge, scoring six points in five games. In 2025, he was selected to compete at the Hlinka Gretzky Cup, where Canada ultimately won the bronze medal. He scored three points in five games at the Hlinka Gretzky Cup.

== Career statistics ==
			Regular season					Playoffs
Season	Team	League	GP	G	A	Pts	PIM	GP	G	A	Pts	PIM
2024–25	Muskegon Lumberjacks	USHL	56	25	29	54	49	14	8	10	18	2
2025–26	Muskegon Lumberjacks	USHL	13	10	7	17	6	—	—	—	—	—
2025–26	Boston University	HE	18	2	5	7	2	—	—	—	—	—
USHL totals			69	35	36	71	55	14	8	10	18	2

== Personal life ==
Lawrence was born on August 3, 2008, in Fredericton, New Brunswick. He grew up in Fredericton and has a brother, Josh, who also played ice hockey and won a Memorial Cup championship with the Saint John Sea Dogs.

Awards and achievements
Preceded by Justin Carbonneau	St. Louis Blues first-round draft pick 2026	Succeeded by Maddox Dagenais
