= Keaton Verhoeff =

Canadian ice hockey player (born 2008)

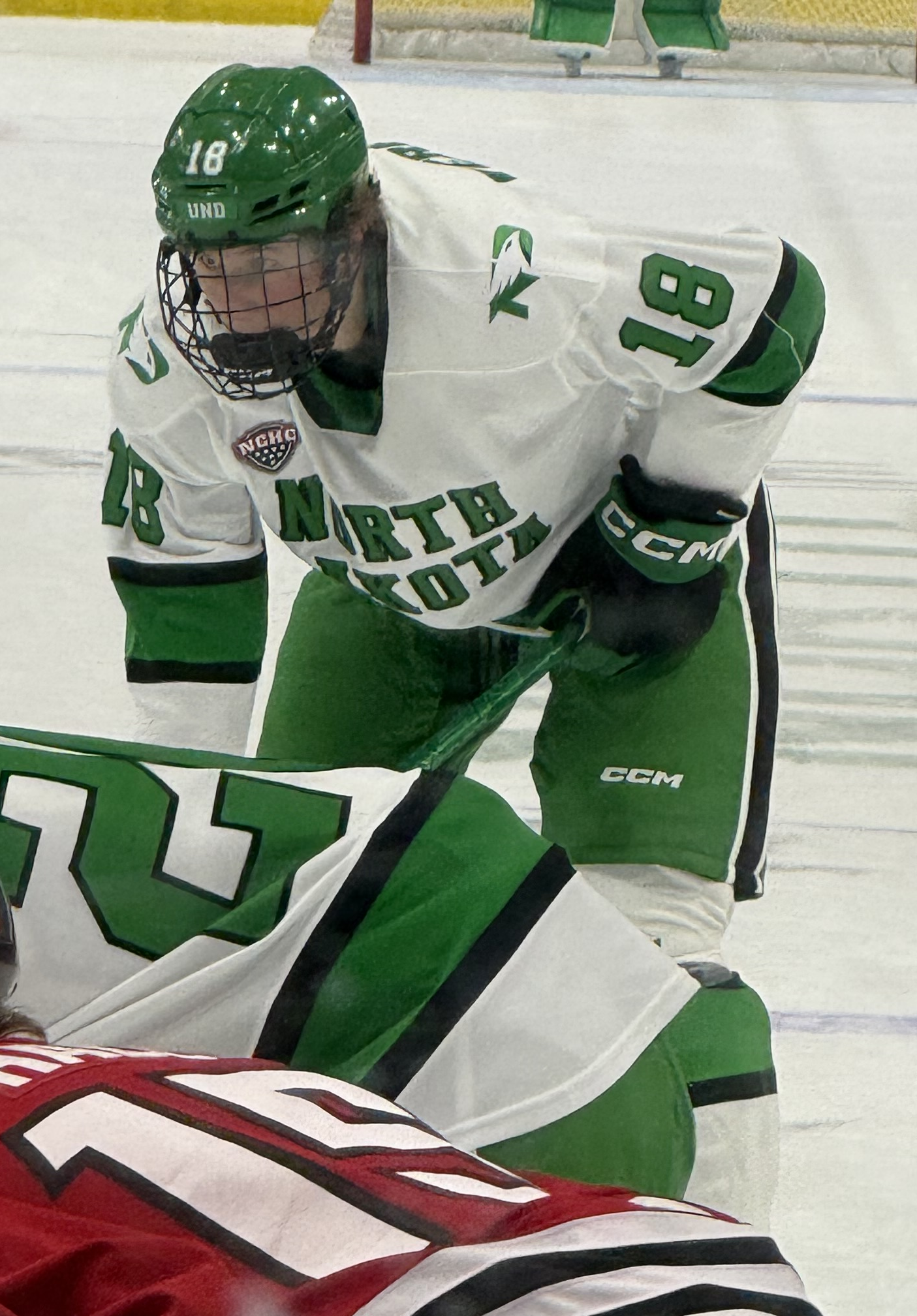
- Verhoeff with North Dakota in 2026
- Born: June 19, 2008 (age 18) Fort Saskatchewan, Alberta, Canada
- Height: 6 ft 4 in (193 cm)
- Weight: 208 lb (94 kg; 14 st 12 lb)
- Position: Defence
- Shoots: Right
- NCAA team: North Dakota Fighting Hawks
- NHL draft: 9th overall, 2026; San Jose Sharks

Keaton Verhoeff (born June 19, 2008) is a Canadian college ice hockey player who is a defenceman for the North Dakota Fighting Hawks of the National Collegiate Athletic Association (NCAA). He previously played two seasons for the Victoria Royals of the Western Hockey League (WHL). He was drafted ninth overall by the San Jose Sharks in the 2026 NHL entry draft.

== Playing career ==
=== Junior ===
Verhoeff had originally started playing ice hockey as a goaltender, and switched to defence when he was 12. He was drafted by the Victoria Royals fourth overall in the 2023 Western Hockey League (WHL) draft.

On December 5, 2023, Verhoeff made his WHL debut with the Royals. He would play in 11 more games with the club, scoring two assists. He would also be held scoreless in four playoff games.

Verhoeff entered his first full WHL season with high expectations. After leaving the team early in the season to represent Canada at the 2024 World U-17 Hockey Challenge, Verhoeff returned and impressed. Verhoeff's play would lead to being named the WHL Rookie of the Week in mid-December 2024, as well as being named a finalist for the Jim Piggott Memorial Trophy for the WHL's top rookie. In total, Verhoeff would finish his with 21 goals and 24 assists for 45 points in 63 games, setting the franchise record for goals by a defenseman, as well as becoming the third 16-year-old defenceman in WHL history to score more than 16 goals in a season. He also added a goal and nine assists in 10 playoff games.

=== Collegiate ===
After the National Collegiate Athletic Association (NCAA) announced in November 2024 that they would allow Canadian Hockey League (CHL) players to join college ice hockey starting in 2025–26, many speculated whether Verhoeff would be one to take advantage of the new opportunity. On May 30, 2025, Verhoeff, alongside Royals teammate Cole Reschny, announced their commitment to the University of North Dakota.

In his first collegiate game against St. Thomas, Verhoeff scored the game-winning goal in a 6-2 victory. In his first 10 games, he would score four goals and two assists. His first multi-point performance came a few games later, with two assists against Bemidji State. Verhoeff would help the Fighting Hawks to the top seed in the 2026 NCHC Tournament, but after defeating Omaha in two games in the first round, Verhoeff and the Fighting Hawks would be upset by Minnesota Duluth. Despite the loss, their stellar regular season performance led to an at-large bid as the top seed in the Sioux Falls Region in the NCAA tournament, and the second overall seed. Thanks in part to Verhoeff's defense, North Dakota would advance to the Frozen Four without conceding a goal. However, they would fall to Wisconsin, ending their season. At season's end, Verhoeff was named to the All-NCHC Rookie Team.

== International play ==
Medal record

Men's ice hockey

Representing Canada

World Junior Championships
Bronze medal – third place	2026 United States	

World U18 Championships
Gold medal – first place	2025 United States	

Hlinka Gretzky Cup
Bronze medal – third place	2025 Czechia/Slovakia	

World U-17 Hockey Challenge
Gold medal – first place	2024 Canada	

Verhoeff has represented Canada on the international stage, playing for the team during the 2024 World U-17 Hockey Challenge, 2025 World U18 Championships, where he won gold both times, and the 2025 Hlinka Gretzky Cup. He captained Canada White in 2024, and served as an alternate captain at the 2025 Hlinka Gretzky Cup, where Canada earned bronze.

In December 2025, he was selected to represent Canada at the 2026 World Junior Championships. During the tournament he recorded four assists in five games and won a bronze medal.

== Personal life ==
Verhoeff is also a cousin of current National Hockey League (NHL) forwards, Kirby and Colton Dach.

== Career statistics ==
=== Regular season and playoffs ===
			Regular season					Playoffs
Season	Team	League	GP	G	A	Pts	PIM	GP	G	A	Pts	PIM
2023–24	Victoria Royals	WHL	12	0	2	2	2	4	0	0	0	2
2024–25	Victoria Royals	WHL	63	21	24	45	14	11	1	9	10	2
2025–26	University of North Dakota	NCHC	36	6	14	20	29	—	—	—	—	—
NCAA totals			36	6	14	20	29	—	—	—	—	—

=== International ===
Year	Team	Event	Result	GP	G	A	Pts	PIM
2024	Canada White	U17	1st place, gold medalist(s)	5	1	4	5	2
2025	Canada	U18	1st place, gold medalist(s)	5	1	4	5	2
2025	Canada	HG18	3rd place, bronze medalist(s)	5	1	3	4	0
2026	Canada	WJC	3rd place, bronze medalist(s)	5	0	4	4	0
2026	Canada	U18	6th	5	0	4	4	2
Junior totals				25	3	19	22	6

== Awards and honours ==
Award	Year	Ref
College
All-NCHC Rookie Team	2026	

Awards and achievements
Preceded by Ivar Stenberg	San Jose Sharks first-round draft pick 2026	Succeeded by Ryan Lin
