= Wyatt Cullen =

American ice hockey player (born 2008)

- Born: September 8, 2008 (age 18) Moorhead, Minnesota, U.S.
- Height: 6 ft 1 in (185 cm)
- Weight: 184 lb (83 kg; 13 st 2 lb)
- Position: Left winger
- Shoots: Left
- USHL team: U.S. NTDP
- NHL draft: 10th overall, 2026; Nashville Predators

Wyatt Cullen (born September 8, 2008) is an American ice hockey left winger for the U.S. National Development Team. The son of former NHL player Matt Cullen, he was drafted by the Nashville Predators in the 2026 NHL entry draft.

== Playing career ==
As a youth, Cullen was a member of the Minnesota North Stars program from 2021 to 2024, the Minnesota Blue Ox from 2022 to 2024, and the Moorhead Bantam from 2022 to 2024, and the Minnesota Sharks from 2023 to 2024. He scored 106 points in 60 games for Moorhead during the 2022–23 season and then totaled 166 points in 60 games during the 2023–24 season with the program. Cullen was honored as the 2024 Bantam Player of the Year by Youth Hockey Hub.

Cullen joined the U.S. National Development Team (NTDP) in 2024. When he first tried out for the National Development Team, he stood at 5 feet 5 inches (1.65 m) and weighed 120 pounds (54 kg), but by two years later he had grown to 6 feet 1 inch (1.85 m) and 176 pounds (80 kg). Cullen was a member of the NTDP U17 team in 2024–25, appearing in 55 games while posting six goals and 25 assists. He returned to the NTDP for the 2025–26 season and was one of the top players with the U18 team.

Cullen was considered a top prospect eligible for the 2026 NHL entry draft. He is committed to play college ice hockey for the Minnesota Golden Gophers, where his brother Brooks also committed to play and his father serves as an assistant coach.

== International play ==
Cullen competed for the U.S. at the 2024 World U-17 Hockey Challenge, posting one assist in five games. Two years later, he was a member of the U.S. team at the 2026 IIHF World U18 Championships, recording nine points in five games.

== Personal life ==
Cullen was born on September 8, 2008, in Moorhead, Minnesota. The middle of three children, he comes from a hockey family. His father Matt, great-grandfather Barry, uncle Mark, great-uncle John, and great-great-uncles Ray and Brian all played in the NHL. His brothers Brooks and Joey, as well as cousins Will and Max, and grandfather Terry also all played hockey.

Awards and achievements
| Preceded by Ryker Lee | Nashville Predators first-round draft pick 2026 | Succeeded by Tommy Bleyl |
