= Markus Ruck =

Canadian ice hockey player (born 2008)

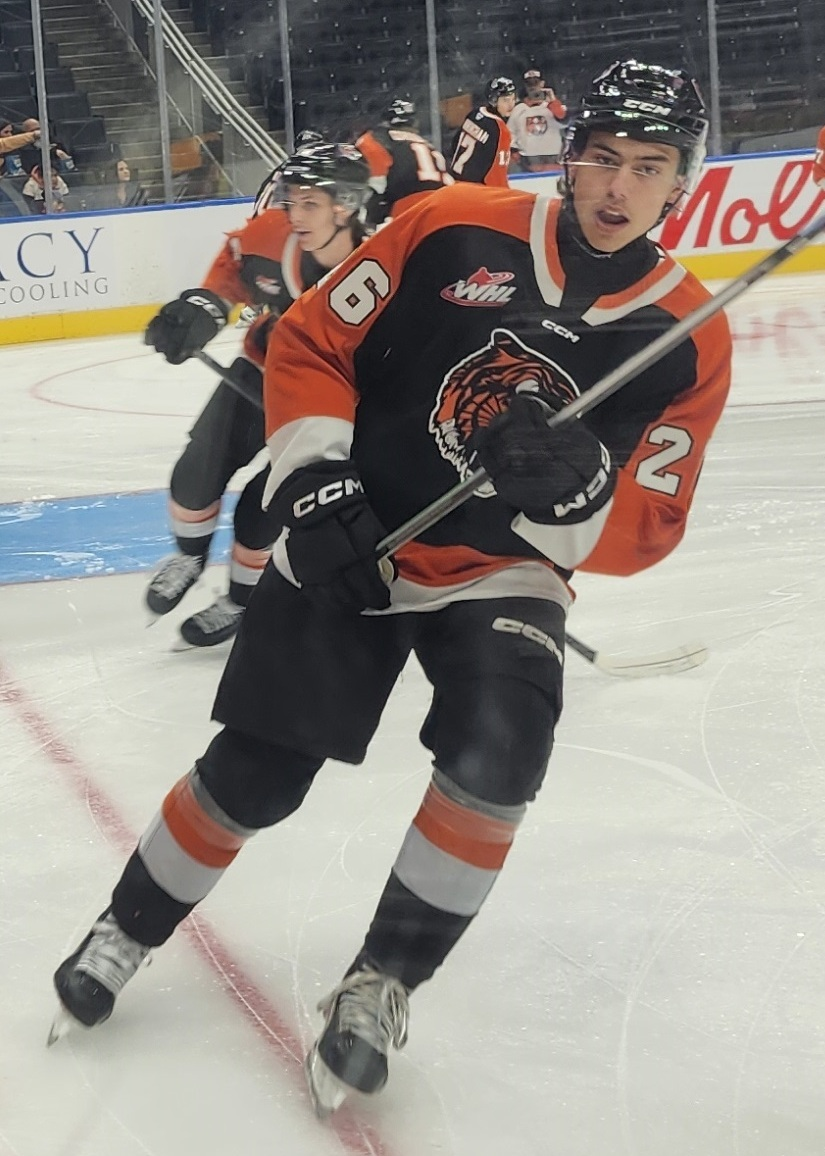
- Markus Ruck with the Medicine Hat Tigers in November 2024
- Born: February 21, 2008 (age 18) Osoyoos, British Columbia, Canada
- Height: 6 ft 0 in (183 cm)
- Weight: 167 lb (76 kg; 11 st 13 lb)
- Position: Forward
- Shoots: Left
- WHL team: Medicine Hat Tigers
- NHL draft: 39th overall, 2026; Pittsburgh Penguins

Markus Ruck (born February 21, 2008) is a Canadian ice hockey player who is a forward for the Medicine Hat Tigers of the Western Hockey League (WHL). He is the identical twin brother of Liam Ruck. He was drafted 39th overall by the Pittsburgh Penguins in the 2026 NHL entry draft. He is the identical twin brother of Liam Ruck, who is also a prospect to the Penguins.

== Playing career ==
Ruck and his twin brother were members of the Okanagan Hockey Academy in Penticton. With the U15 team, he posted seven goals and 25 assists in 30 games during the 2021–22 season. He then recorded 22 goals and 65 assists for a total of 87 points in 2022–23, followed by 18 goals and 44 assists for a total of 62 points in 2023–24. Ruck was selected by the Medicine Hat Tigers in the first round, with the 21st overall pick, of the 2023 Western Hockey League (WHL) Prospects Draft. His brother Liam had been selected by the Tigers with the ninth overall pick.

Ruck appeared in two games for the Tigers during the 2023–24 season. In 2024–25, he and his brother helped the team to a win at the WHL championship, as Markus recorded eight goals and 21 assists in 62 games. After Gavin McKenna and Ryder Ritchie departed the Tigers, the Ruck twins saw expanded roles in 2025–26. For the 2025–26 season, they were the two leading scorers in the WHL. Appearing in 68 games, Markus posted 21 goals and 87 assists for a total of 108 points, leading the WHL in scoring and leading the entire Canadian Hockey League (CHL) in assists, while his brother finished second in the WHL with 104 points. They were both named first-team WHL Eastern Conference all-stars and were invited to the WHL Prospects Game, where they served as alternate captains.

Both brothers announced their commitment to play for the University of North Dakota beginning in the 2027–28 season on June 22, 2026.

Ruck and his brother were considered top prospects for the 2026 NHL entry draft. They were both selected in the draft by the Pittsburgh Penguins: Liam in the first round, with the 22th pick, and Markus in the second round, with the 39th pick.

== International play ==
Ruck and his brother both competed for Canada at the 2024 Winter Youth Olympics. Later that year, the two both played at the 2024 World U-17 Hockey Challenge and helped their team to the gold medal. Markus Ruck tallied two goals and two assists in five games at the tournament. The brothers also competed at the 2025 Hlinka Gretzky Cup and won a bronze medal, with Markus posting four assists in five games.

== Personal life ==
Ruck was born on February 21, 2008, in Osoyoos, British Columbia. He and his brother Liam are identical mirror twins; according to The Athletic, "they do everything opposite. Markus is a left-handed shot who writes with his right hand. Liam is a right-handed shot who writes with his left hand. They bat, golf and throw a ball opposite." Markus was born first, by eight minutes. Their father, Derek, also played in the WHL. The brothers grew up in Osoyoos. At two years old, they began skating, and they also played baseball and soccer growing up. Since childhood, they have been best friends with Anaheim Ducks draft pick Mathis Preston, who was selected shortly after the twins.

== Career statistics ==
=== Regular season and playoffs ===
Bold indicates led league

			Regular season					Playoffs
Season	Team	League	GP	G	A	Pts	PIM	GP	G	A	Pts	PIM
2023–24	Medicine Hat Tigers	WHL	2	0	0	0	0	—	—	—	—	—
2024–25	Medicine Hat Tigers	WHL	62	8	21	29	6	14	1	3	4	6
2025–26	Medicine Hat Tigers	WHL	68	21	**87**	**108**	28	15	4	9	13	2
WHL totals			132	29	108	137	34	29	5	12	17	8
