= Dima Zhilkin =

- Born: October 21, 2008 (age 18) Moscow, Russia
- Height: 5 ft 11 in (180 cm)
- Weight: 196 lb (89 kg; 14 st 0 lb)
- Position: Right wing
- Shoots: Right
- OHL team: Saginaw Spirit
- NHL draft: Eligible 2027

Dima Zhilkin (born October 21, 2008) is a Russian-Canadian ice hockey right winger for the Saginaw Spirit of the Ontario Hockey League (OHL). He is considered a top prospect eligible for the 2027 NHL entry draft.

== Playing career ==
Zhilkin started his career with the academy of HC CSKA Moscow before moving to Canada at age eight. In Canada, he became a member of the Toronto Jr. Canadiens program. Zhilkin played for the U14 team in 2021–22, the U15 team in 2022–23, and the U16 team in 2023–24, scoring 22 points in 34 games with the U16 team. In 2023–24, he also made four appearances for the Toronto Patriots of the Ontario Junior Hockey League (OJHL), recording two points. Zhilkin was selected by the Saginaw Spirit with the 19th overall pick of the 2024 Ontario Hockey League (OHL) draft.

With the Spirit during the 2024–25 season, Zhilkin appeared in 54 regular season games and was named to the OHL All-Rookie first-team after scoring 16 goals and 27 assists, being the seventh-leading rookie in scoring with 43 points. In 2025–26, he appeared in 59 games and tallied 36 goals and 39 assists for a total of 75 points with the Spirit. Zhilkin returned to Saginaw in 2026–27 and was named to Team CHL for the CHL USA Prospects Challenge.

Zhilkin is regarded as a top prospect eligible for the 2027 NHL entry draft. He committed to play college ice hockey for the Michigan Wolverines starting with the 2027–28 season.

== International career ==
Zhilkin played for Canada, the bronze medalists, at the 2025 Hlinka Gretzky Cup, scoring three goals in five games. He also competed for Canada at the 2026 IIHF World U18 Championships, scoring five goals and two assists in five games. He was named to the Canadian team at the World Junior Summer Showcase in 2026 as the youngest player selected.

== Personal life ==
Zhilkin was born on October 21, 2008, in Moscow, Russia. He is the younger brother of NHL player Danil Zhilkin, and became inspired to play hockey by watching his brother. When Zhilkin was around five years old, his brother, sister, and mother moved to Canada for his brother's hockey career. Zhilkin and his father remained in Russia for two and a half years until they were able to acquire visas. He moved to Canada at age eight. In Canada, he lived in Oakville, Ontario.

Zhilkin is known as a "trash talker", and has said that he does "Tons [of it] ... I love it. Once I say something to a guy, just seeing his reaction adds more fuel to my fire and it makes me play better." He also described to The Sports Network being "super proud" of achieving 100 penalty minutes during the 2025–26 OHL season, stating, "I know that I can go into a fight and win any fight that I want". He said his brother helped improve his fighting ability: "Fighting with my brother when I was younger, not really on the ice, but off the ice a little bit, just [learning] how to get those licks in."
