= Malte Gustafsson =

Swedish ice hockey player (born 2008)

- Born: June 11, 2008 (age 18) Väckelsång, Sweden
- Height: 194 cm (6 ft 4 in)
- Weight: 90.72 kg (200 lb; 14 st 4 lb)
- Position: Defence
- Shoots: Left
- NHL draft: 13th overall, 2026; New York Islanders
- Playing career: 2025–present

Malte Gustafsson (born June 11, 2008) is a Swedish professional ice hockey player who is a defenceman for HV71 of the Swedish Hockey League (SHL). He was drafted 13th overall by the New York Islanders in the 2026 NHL entry draft.

== Playing career ==
Medal record

Men's ice hockey

Representing Sweden

World U18 Championships
Gold medal – first place	2026 Slovakia	

Leading up the draft, Gustafsson was a highly rated defenceman. Gustafsson played for Sweden at the 2024 World U-17 Hockey Challenge, getting a bronze medal, and the 2025 Hlinka Gretzky Cup, getting a silver medal.

Awards and achievements
Preceded by Kashawn Aitcheson	New York Islanders first round pick 2026	Succeeded by Incumbent
