= Alexander Command =

Swedish ice hockey player (born 2008)

- Born: 16 June 2008 (age 18) Danderyd, Sweden
- Height: 6 ft 1 in (185 cm)
- Weight: 183 lb (83 kg; 13 st 1 lb)
- Position: Centre
- Shoots: Left
- SHL team: Örebro HK
- NHL draft: 12th overall, 2026; New Jersey Devils
- Playing career: 2026–present

Alexander Command (born 16 June 2008) is a Swedish professional ice hockey player who is a centre for Örebro HK of the Swedish Hockey League (SHL). He was drafted 12th overall by the New Jersey Devils in the 2026 NHL entry draft.

== Playing career ==
Command, who grew up in Danderyd, Sweden, played for the club SDE Hockey before joining Örebro HK. With SDE's U16 program, he scored 14 points in 17 games during the 2022–23 season before moving up to the U18 team in 2023–24. Playing for SDE in the J18 Region, he posted four goals and four assists in 19 games before scoring five goals and 10 assists in 18 games for the team in the J18 Nationell tournament.

Command moved to Örebro HK in 2024–25, where he was a standout in the J18 Region and also saw playing time with the U20 team in the J20 Nationell. He recorded 23 points in the J18 Region, 33 points in the J18 Nationell and made seven appearances in the J20 Nationell, posting eight points. In his second season with Örebro, he "exploded into one of the country's most exciting players", according to Hockey Sverige. Appearing in 30 J20 Nationell games, Command was the top scorer on his team with 17 goals and 27 assists, additionally recording 96 shots while having a plus-minus rating of plus-10. He also played for the U20 team in 14 playoff games, recording 13 points, and made six appearances for the senior team in the Swedish Hockey League (SHL). On 14 May 2026, Command signed a contract extension with his club through 2027–28.

Command was selected by the New Jersey Devils in the first round, 12th overall, of the 2026 NHL entry draft. His tenure with the organization was brief, with his signing rights being traded to the Winnipeg Jets on 23 October 2026, as part of a package for the Devils to acquire goaltender Connor Hellebuyck.

== International play ==
Medal record

Men's ice hockey

Representing Sweden

World U18 Championships
Gold medal – first place	2026 Slovakia	

Command made three appearances for the Sweden U17 national hockey team in 2024–25 and had three points. He was selected for Sweden's team at the 2026 World U18 Championships, where he played alongside several of his teammates from Örebro. In the semifinals, against the Czech Republic, he helped Sweden rally after going down 3–1, posting a goal and an assist in a 4–3 victory in extra time. Sweden ended up winning the championship. In seven games at the tournament, Command tallied three goals, four assists, 21 shots, and a rating of plus-four.

== Career statistics ==
=== Regular season and playoffs ===
			Regular season					Playoffs
Season	Team	League	GP	G	A	Pts	PIM	GP	G	A	Pts	PIM
2023–24	SDE HF	J18	18	5	10	15	4	2	0	1	1	0
2024–25	Örebro HK	J18	17	16	17	33	12	4	5	1	6	0
2024–25	Örebro HK	J20	7	5	3	8	2	1	0	1	1	0
2025–26	Örebro HK	J20	30	17	27	44	61	14	5	8	13	12
2025–26	Örebro HK	SHL	6	0	0	0	0	—	—	—	—	—
SHL totals			6	0	0	0	0	—	—	—	—	—

=== International ===
Year	Team	Event	Result	GP	G	A	Pts	PIM
2026	Sweden	U18	1st place, gold medalist(s)	7	3	4	7	4
Junior totals				7	3	4	7	4

Awards and achievements
Preceded by Anton Silayev	New Jersey Devils first-round draft pick 2026	Succeeded by Incumbent
