= Elton Hermansson =

Swedish ice hockey player (born 2008)

- Born: 5 February 2008 (age 18) Örnsköldsvik, Sweden
- Height: 185 cm (6 ft 1 in)
- Weight: 82 kg (181 lb; 12 st 13 lb)
- Position: Winger
- Shoots: Right
- HA team: Modo Hockey
- NHL draft: 19th overall, 2026; Los Angeles Kings
- Playing career: 2025–present

Elton Hermansson (born 5 February 2008) is a Swedish professional ice hockey player who is a winger for Modo Hockey of the HockeyAllsvenskan. He was drafted 19th overall by the Los Angeles Kings in the 2026 NHL entry draft.

== Playing career ==
Hermansson had 37 points in 45 games in Sweden's top U-20 league.

== International ==
Medal record

Men's ice hockey

Representing Sweden

World U18 Championships
Gold medal – first place	2026 Slovakia	

Hermansson represented Sweden at the 2025 Hlinka Gretzky Cup, and finished second in tournament scoring.

== Personal life ==
Hermansson's father, Lennart, also played for Modo.

Awards and achievements
Preceded by Henry Brzustewicz	Los Angeles Kings first-round draft pick 2026	Succeeded by Incumbent
