= Timothy Kazda =

Slovak ice hockey player (born 2008)

- Born: 4 October 2008 (age 18) Ilava, Slovakia
- Height: 6 ft 1 in (185 cm)
- Weight: 194 lb (88 kg; 13 st 12 lb)
- Position: Forward
- Shoots: Right
- OHL team: Guelph Storm
- NHL draft: Eligible 2027

Timothy Kazda (born 4 October 2008) is a Slovak ice hockey forward for the Guelph Storm of the Ontario Hockey League (OHL). He is considered a top prospect eligible for the 2027 NHL entry draft.

== Playing career ==
Kazda moved to the United States at 14 years old to attend Seacoast Performance Academy (SPA). In three seasons with SPA he recorded 136 goals and 92 assists for 228 points in 146 games. He was drafted by the Chicago Steel in third round of the 2024 USHL Futures Draft. During the 2025–26 season, in his first full season with the Steel, he recorded 22 goals and 19 assists in 59 games. He was subsequently named to the All-Rookie First Team.

On 30 June 2026, he was drafted fourth overall by the Guelph Storm in the 2026 CHL Import Draft. On 13 July 2026, he signed with the Storm for the 2026–27 season.

He is committed to play college ice hockey at Boston College during the 2027–28 season.

== International play ==
He represented Slovakia at the 2025 IIHF World U18 Championships. During the bronze medal game against the United States he recorded two assists.

He again represented Slovakia at the 2026 IIHF World U18 Championships where he led the tournament in scoring with six goals and six assists in seven games and won a silver medal. He was subsequently named tournament MVP, and was also named to the media all-star team.

== Career statistics ==
=== Regular season and playoffs ===
			Regular season					Playoffs
Season	Team	League	GP	G	A	Pts	PIM	GP	G	A	Pts	PIM
2024–25	Chicago Steel	USHL	6	0	0	0	0	—	—	—	—	—
2025–26	Chicago Steel	USHL	59	22	19	41	58	—	—	—	—	—
USHL totals			65	22	19	41	58	—	—	—	—	—

=== International ===
Year	Team	Event	Result	GP	G	A	Pts	PIM
2025	Slovakia	U18	4th	1	0	2	2	0
2026	Slovakia	U18	2nd place, silver medalist(s)	7	6	6	12	0
Junior totals				8	6	8	14	0
