= Anton Silaev =

Russian ice hockey player (born 2006)

- Born: 11 April 2006 (age 20) Sarov, Russia
- Height: 6 ft 7 in (201 cm)
- Weight: 207 lb (94 kg; 14 st 11 lb)
- Position: Defence
- Shoots: Left
- NHL team (P) Cur. team Former teams: New Jersey Devils; Utica Comets (AHL); Torpedo Nizhny Novgorod
- NHL draft: 10th overall, 2024; New Jersey Devils
- Playing career: 2023–present

Anton Silaev (Russian: Антон Силаев; born 11 April 2006) is a Russian professional ice hockey player who is a defenceman for the Utica Comets of the American Hockey League (AHL) as a prospect to the New Jersey Devils of the National Hockey League (NHL). He was drafted 10th overall by the New Jersey Devils in the 2024 NHL entry draft.

== Playing career ==
Silaev began playing ice hockey at four years old, and became a defenceman at eight when a coach told him he was "too big" to play forward. In 2017, he moved to Nizhny Novgorod to play in the farm system of Kontinental Hockey League (KHL) club Torpedo.

Playing in the Russian Junior Hockey League (MHL) during the 2022–23 season, Silaev recorded eight points in 41 games, playing in first and second pair roles for championship-winning Chaika Nizhny Novgorod.

Initially attending 2023 training camp in the MHL, Silaev was called up to Torpedo's KHL team for the preseason and earned a roster spot to start the 2023–24 season. In his KHL debut at 17 years old, the season opener against Lokomotiv Yaroslavl, he recorded nearly 20 minutes of time on ice, a significant display of trust from coach Igor Larionov in a league where young players typically begin their careers with extremely limited minutes. With his first KHL goal, scored against Ak Bars Kazan, he became the youngest goal scorer in Torpedo history. By the end of September 2023, he had tallied one goal and six points in 12 games, averaging over 17 minutes per game and winning rookie of the month honours.

Although his rate of scoring cooled significantly as the season progressed, his 11 points and 63 games played were enough to break the league's records for points by an under-18 player, points by an under-19 defenceman, and games played by an under-18 defenceman. He would also lead Torpedo with 98 hits and earn a nomination for KHL rookie of the year. In five playoff games, he added two assists in Torpedo's first round exit at the hands of SKA Saint Petersburg. Upon Torpedo's elimination, he was reassigned to Chaika, where he tallied three more assists in 10 games en route to a semifinal exit. Following the season, he was drafted 10th overall by the New Jersey Devils in the 2024 NHL entry draft.

On 1 June 2026, Silaev was signed to a three-year, entry-level contract by the Devils. He made his NHL debut on 14 November 2026 after Brett Pesce and Vladislav Kolyachonok both fell ill, logging just over 12 minutes of ice time in a 7–4 victory against the Washington Capitals.

== Career statistics ==
			Regular season					Playoffs
Season	Team	League	GP	G	A	Pts	PIM	GP	G	A	Pts	PIM
2022–23	Chaika Nizhny Novgorod	MHL	41	2	6	8	28	17	0	2	2	29
2023–24	Torpedo Nizhny Novgorod	KHL	63	3	8	11	10	5	0	2	2	4
2023–24	Chaika Nizhny Novgorod	MHL	—	—	—	—	—	10	0	3	3	22
2024–25	Torpedo Nizhny Novgorod	KHL	63	2	10	12	37	4	0	0	0	2
2024–25	Torpedo-Gorky Nizhny Novgorod	VHL	—	—	—	—	—	17	1	1	2	6
2025–26	Torpedo Nizhny Novgorod	KHL	61	1	2	3	10	10	0	2	2	13
2025–26	Chaika Nizhny Novgorod	MHL	—	—	—	—	—	4	0	2	2	0
KHL totals			187	6	20	26	57	19	0	4	4	19

Awards and achievements
Preceded by Šimon Nemec	New Jersey Devils first-round draft pick 2024	Succeeded by Alexander Command
