= Sammy Nelson (ice hockey) =

American ice hockey player (born 2008)

- Born: September 19, 2008 (age 18) Maple Grove, Minnesota, U.S.
- Height: 6 ft 2 in (188 cm)
- Weight: 197 lb (89 kg; 14 st 1 lb)
- Position: Forward
- Shoots: Right
- NCAA team: Notre Dame
- NHL draft: Eligible 2027

Samuel Nelson (born September 19, 2008) is an American college ice hockey player who is a forward for Notre Dame of the National Collegiate Athletic Association (NCAA). He is considered a top prospect eligible for the 2027 NHL entry draft.

== Playing career ==
Nelson played two seasons for the U.S. National Development Team. During the 2024–25 season he recorded 16 goals and 15 assists in 50 games with the under-17 team. He also recorded 12 goals and seven assists in 38 games with the NTDP in the United States Hockey League (USHL). During the 2025–26 season he recorded 27 goals and 27 assists in 58 games with the under-18 team. He also recorded nine goals and ten assists in 21 games with the NTDP in the USHL. He competed in the 2025 CHL-USHL Prospect Challenge.

On May 8, 2025, he committed to play college ice hockey at Notre Dame during the 2026–27 season.

== International play ==
He represented the United States at the 2026 IIHF World U18 Championships where he recorded three goals and one assist in five games.

== Personal life ==
Nelson was born to Barb and Victor Nelson, and has two older brothers, Henry and Danny. Both of his brothers are also ice hockey players for Notre Dame. Danny was drafted in the second round, 49th overall, by the New York Islanders in the 2023 NHL entry draft.

== Career statistics ==
=== Regular season and playoffs ===
			Regular season					Playoffs
Season	Team	League	GP	G	A	Pts	PIM	GP	G	A	Pts	PIM
2024–25	U.S. National Development Team	USHL	38	12	7	19	40	—	—	—	—	—
2025–26	U.S. National Development Team	USHL	21	9	10	19	18	—	—	—	—	—
USHL totals			59	21	17	38	58	—	—	—	—	—

=== International ===
Year	Team	Event	Result	GP	G	A	Pts	PIM
2025	United States	U17	3rd place, bronze medalist(s)	5	2	3	5	2
2025	United States	U18	5th	5	3	1	4	6
Junior totals				10	5	4	9	8
