= Carter Meyer =

American ice hockey player (born 2009)

- Born: April 10, 2009 (age 17) Winchester, Massachusetts, U.S.
- Height: 6 ft 1 in (185 cm)
- Weight: 179 lb (81 kg; 12 st 11 lb)
- Position: Center
- Shoots: Left
- QMJHL team: Quebec Remparts
- NHL draft: Eligible 2027

Carter Meyer (born April 10, 2009) is an American ice hockey center for the Quebec Remparts of the Quebec Maritimes Junior Hockey League (QMJHL). He is considered a top prospect eligible for the 2027 NHL entry draft.

== Playing career ==
Meyer was a member of the Boston Jr. Eagles program where he was coached by his father. With the Boston U13 team in 2022–23, he recorded 13 goals and five assists in 12 games. He played for the U14 team in 2023–24 and the U15 team in 2024–25. Meyer also played for the hockey team at the Rivers School in Weston, Massachusetts, where he scored 18 goals and 39 points in 30 games in 2023–24, followed by 41 goals and 70 points in 28 games the next season. In 2025, he was one of three players from his school selected for the U.S. National Development Team (NTDP).

Meyer was also selected by the Quebec Remparts in the first round, 17th overall, of the 2025 Quebec Maritimes Junior Hockey League (QMJHL) draft. He tallied 45 points in 41 games for the NTDP U17 team during the 2025–26 season while also recording 25 points in 29 games with the NTDP U18 team. Meyer decided to leave the NTDP in 2026. He then joined the Remparts in the QMJHL. During his first season there, he was named to Team CHL for the CHL USA Prospects Challenge.

Meyer is considered a top prospect eligible for the 2027 NHL entry draft. He is committed to play college ice hockey for the Boston University Terriers starting with the 2027–28 season.

== International career ==
Meyer posted 10 points in four games at the 2025 World U-17 Hockey Challenge for the United States. He also competed at the 2026 IIHF World U18 Championships, recording five points in five games.

== Personal life ==
Meyer was born on April 10, 2009, in Winchester, Massachusetts. He is the son of former NHL player Freddy Meyer, and has a brother, Freddy Jr., who plays with him for Quebec. He lived for a time in Örnsköldsvik, Sweden, when his father played for Modo Hockey of the Swedish Elite League (SEL).

Meyer attended the Rivers School in Weston, Massachusetts, where he was coached by his father.
