= Adam Valentini =

Canadian ice hockey player (born 2008)

- Born: April 11, 2008 (age 18) Toronto, Ontario, Canada
- Height: 5 ft 10 in (178 cm)
- Weight: 190 lb (86 kg; 13 st 8 lb)
- Position: Forward
- Shoots: Left
- NCAA team: University of Michigan
- NHL draft: 96th overall, 2026; Utah Mammoth

Adam Valentini (born April 11, 2008) is a Canadian college ice hockey forward for the University of Michigan of the National Collegiate Athletic Association (NCAA). He was selected by the Utah Mammoth in the third round, 96th-overall, in the 2026 NHL entry draft.

== Playing career ==
=== Junior ===
On March 27, 2024, Valentini was drafted 13th overall by the Mississauga Steelheads in the 2024 OHL Priority Selection. On April 30, 2024, he signed with the Chicago Steel of the United States Hockey League (USHL). During the 2024–25 season, he recorded 17 goals and 22 assists in 58 games. He led the Steel in scoring as a 16-year-old with 39 points.

On June 5, 2025, he signed with the Kitchener Rangers. However, in August 2025, he revoked his commitment and announced he would join Michigan a year early.

=== College ===
On July 14, 2024, Valentini committed to play college ice hockey at Michigan. He made his collegiate debut on October 3, 2025, against Mercyhurst, and scored his first career point, an assist. On October 16, 2025, against Robert Morris, he scored his first two career goals, including the game-winning goal. During the 2026 NCAA tournament regional final against Minnesota Duluth Bulldogs he had a power-play goal to help Michigan advance to the Frozen Four. During the 2025–26 season, in his rookie year, he recorded 11 goals and 16 assists in 40 games. At 17-years old, he was one of five under-18 skaters in the NCAA. He led all under-18 players in points with 26 and points per game at 0.68.

== International play ==
In December 2023, he was selected to represent Canada at the 2024 Winter Youth Olympics. During the tournament he recorded one goal in four games. He then represented Canada White at the 2024 World U-17 Hockey Challenge, where he led the tournament in scoring with nine points in five games, and won a gold medal.

On April 13, 2026, Valentini was selected to represent Canada at the 2026 IIHF World U18 Championships. During the tournament he recorded three goals and two assists in five games.

== Career statistics ==
=== Regular season and playoffs ===
			Regular season					Playoffs
Season	Team	League	GP	G	A	Pts	PIM	GP	G	A	Pts	PIM
2024–25	Chicago Steel	USHL	58	17	22	39	24	—	—	—	—	—
2025–26	University of Michigan	B1G	40	11	16	27	46	—	—	—	—	—
NCAA totals			40	11	16	27	46	—	—	—	—	—

=== International ===
Year	Team	Event	Result	GP	G	A	Pts	PIM
2026	Canada	U18	6th	5	3	2	5	0
Junior totals				5	2	3	5	0
