= Ryan Lin =

Canadian ice hockey player (born 2008)

- Born: April 18, 2008 (age 18) Richmond, British Columbia, Canada
- Height: 5 ft 11 in (180 cm)
- Weight: 178 lb (81 kg; 12 st 10 lb)
- Position: Defence
- Shoots: Right
- WHL team: Vancouver Giants
- NHL draft: 21st overall, 2026; San Jose Sharks

Ryan Lin (born April 18, 2008) is a Canadian ice hockey defenceman for the Vancouver Giants of the Western Hockey League (WHL). Lin was drafted 21st overall by the San Jose Sharks in the 2026 NHL entry draft.

== Playing career ==
Lin played youth hockey with the Delta Hockey Academy (DHA) in the Canadian Sport School Hockey League. During the 2022–23 season with the DHA U15 Prep Green team, he recorded 17 goals and 24 assists in 27 games. He was also called up to the DHA U17 Prep team during the season, with 4 assists in 4 games. On May 11, 2023, Lin was drafted sixth overall by the Vancouver Giants in the 2023 WHL Prospects draft, signing with the Giants on the 18th. After signing with the Giants, Lin was assigned back to the DHA, playing with their U18 prep team.

During the 2023–24 season, he was selected to play for Canada at the 2024 Winter Youth Olympics. At the time of his roster selection in December 2023, he ranked third across all CSSHL U18 prep defencemen in points with 25 in 19 games. By the end of the season, Lin had 10 goals and 22 assists in 28 games, while also playing a game each for the Richmond Sockeyes of the Pacific Junior Hockey League and the Vancouver Giants.

Entering the 2024–25 WHL season, Lin was added to the Giants roster and quickly became a core piece, being placed on the first power play line and being on the first overtime line. With Lin recording over twenty minutes of ice-time each game, his unexpected performance with thirteen assists in thirteen games, the fourth highest in WHL rookie scoring at the time, led to him being named the best Giants defenceman since Bowen Byram in his 2017–18 season and one of the best seasons from a 16-year-old in Giants history. Lin continued to impress throughout the season, earning WHL rookie of the week honors for the January 12–19 week, recording four points in two games. By the time Lin earned his rookie of the week honours, he had already broken the record for most points by a 16-year-old Giants defenceman, breaking David Musil's 32-point season in the 2009–10 season. By the end of the season, Lin recorded 5 goals and 48 assists in 60 games, becoming one of three rookie defenceman to record over 50 points in a season along with Scott Niedermayer and Landon DuPont. He was named one of six WHL players in contention for the Jim Piggott Memorial Trophy; DuPont won the award on the April 24. He was also named to the 2024–25 CHL All-Rookie team.

Entering the 2025–26 WHL season, as a projected top-15 pick in the 2026 NHL entry draft, Lin had considered going the NCAA route but stuck with the Vancouver Giants. Prior to the season beginning, he was named to the 2025 CHL USA Prospects Challenge. Lin began the season with two goals and eight assists through ten games.

== International play ==
In December 2023, Lin was selected to the Canada under-18 team roster for the 2024 Winter Youth Olympics. He contributed one goal and four assists in four games, placing in fourth after losing to Finland 4–5 in shootout.

During the 2024–25 season, Lin was selected to the Canada White U17 roster for the 2024 World U-17 Hockey Challenge, recording one goal and one assist in five games. He was also selected for the 2025 IIHF World U18 Championships, recording one goal and one assist in seven games.

Throughout the 2025 offseason, he joined Canada's roster along with top 2026 prospect Keaton Verhoeff and top 2027 prospect Landon DuPont for the 2025 Hlinka Gretzky Cup. He had two goals and three assists in five games.

== Career statistics ==
			Regular season					Playoffs
Season	Team	League	GP	G	A	Pts	PIM	GP	G	A	Pts	PIM
2023–24	Vancouver Giants	WHL	1	0	0	0	0	3	0	0	0	4
2023–24	Richmond Sockeyes	PJHL	1	0	1	1	0	—	—	—	—	—
2024–25	Vancouver Giants	WHL	60	5	48	53	14	5	0	2	2	6
2025–26	Vancouver Giants	WHL	53	14	43	57	35	—	—	—	—	—
WHL totals			114	19	91	110	49	8	0	2	2	10

== Awards and honours ==
Award	Year	Ref
CHL
CHL All-Rookie team	2025	

Awards and achievements
Preceded by Keaton Verhoeff	San Jose Sharks first-round draft pick 2026	Succeeded by Incumbent
