= Adam Goljer =

Slovak ice hockey player (born 2008)

- Born: 7 June 2008 (age 18) Trenčín, Slovakia
- Height: 6 ft 3 in (191 cm)
- Weight: 194 lb (88 kg; 13 st 12 lb)
- Position: Defence
- Shoots: Right
- Slovak team: HK Dukla Trenčín
- NHL draft: 49th overall, 2026; Los Angeles Kings
- Playing career: 2023–present

Adam Goljer (born 7 June 2008) is a professional Slovak ice hockey defenceman for HK Dukla Trenčín of the Slovak Extraliga

== Playing career ==
During the 2025–26 season, he recorded four goals and seven assists in 43 games for HK Dukla Trenčín. His 11 points were the fifth-most points ever by an under-18 defenseman in Slovak Extraliga history.

Goljer was drafted by the Los Angeles Kings in the 2026 NHL entry draft.

== International play ==
Medal record

Ice hockey

Representing Slovakia

World U18 Championships
Silver medal – second place	2026 Slovakia	

Goljer represented Slovakia at the 2026 IIHF World U18 Championships where he won a silver medal and was named to the media all-star team and was named best defenceman by the IIHF Directorate. He then represented Slovakia at the 2026 World Junior Ice Hockey Championships.

== Career statistics ==
=== Regular season and playoffs ===
			Regular season					Playoffs
Season	Team	League	GP	G	A	Pts	PIM	GP	G	A	Pts	PIM
2023–24	Dukla Trenčín	Slovak	2	0	0	0	0	—	—	—	—	—
2024–25	Dukla Trenčín	Slovak	6	0	0	0	0	4	0	0	0	0
2025–26	Dukla Trenčín	Slovak	43	4	7	11	40	—	—	—	—	—
Slovak totals			51	4	7	11	40	4	0	0	0	0

=== International ===
Year	Team	Event	Result	GP	G	A	Pts	PIM
2025	Slovakia	U18	2nd place, silver medalist(s)	5	0	0	0	2
Junior totals				5	0	0	0	2
