= Oliver Suvanto =

Finnish ice hockey player (born 2008)

- Born: 3 September 2008 (age 17) Turku, Finland
- Height: 6 ft 3 in (191 cm)
- Weight: 207 lb (94 kg; 14 st 11 lb)
- Position: Centre
- Shoots: Left
- Liiga team: Tappara
- NHL draft: 18th overall, 2026; Washington Capitals
- Playing career: 2025–present

Oliver Suvanto (born 3 September 2008) is a Finnish professional ice hockey player who is a centre for Tappara of the Liiga. He was drafted 18th overall by the Washington Capitals in the 2026 NHL entry draft.

== Playing career ==
As a 17-year-old, Suvanto scored two goals and five assists in 30 games for Tappara, with one scout comparing him as the most complete Liiga prospect since Aleksander Barkov.

== International play ==
Suvanto won a bronze medal at the Winter Youth Olympics. He was a member of Team Finland at the 2025 Hlinka Gretzky Cup, in a fourth-place finish.

Awards and achievements
Preceded by Lynden Lakovic	Washington Capitals first-round draft pick 2026	Succeeded by Incumbent
