= Juho Piiparinen =

Finnish ice hockey player (born 2008)

- Born: 10 August 2008 (age 17) Lahti, Finland
- Height: 188 cm (6 ft 2 in)
- Weight: 91.2 kg (201 lb; 14 st 5 lb)
- Position: Defence
- Shoots: Right
- NHL team (P) Cur. team: Vegas Golden Knights; Tappara (Liiga)
- NHL draft: 29th overall, 2026; Vegas Golden Knights
- Playing career: 2025–present

Juho Piiparinen (born 10 August 2008) is a Finnish professional ice hockey player who is a defenceman for Tappara of the Liiga while under contract to the Vegas Golden Knights of the National Hockey League (NHL). He was drafted 29th overall by the Golden Knights in the 2026 NHL entry draft.

== Playing career ==
Piiparinen played for team Finland at the 2025 Hlinka Gretzky Cup.

On 15 July 2026, Piiparinen signed his three-year, entry-level contract with the Vegas Golden Knights.

Awards and achievements
Preceded by Trevor Connelly	Vegas Golden Knights first-round draft pick 2026	Succeeded by Incumbent
