= Danil Zhilkin =

Russian hockey player (born 2003)

- Born: December 19, 2003 (age 22) Moscow, Russia
- Height: 6 ft 1 in (185 cm)
- Weight: 192 lb (87 kg; 13 st 10 lb)
- Position: Centre
- Shoots: Left
- NHL team: Winnipeg Jets

Danil (Danny) Zhilkin (born December 19, 2003) is a Canadian-Russian ice hockey player who currently plays for the Winnipeg Jets. Zhilkin made his NHL debut on January 8, 2026. Zhilkin played 4 games with the Jets in January, 2026 where he earned a +2 rating with limited ice time and some penalty kill time. He returned to the Manitoba Moose of the AHL where he centered the first line and remained a top producer for the Jets AHL affiliate. He was recalled to the Jets on an emergency basis on March 27, 2026. He is the fourth line centre for the Jets as they push to earn the second wildcard spot in the 2026 NHL playoffs. He earned his first career NHL point with a wraparound assist during the Jets game versus the Blackhawks on March 31st, 2026.

== Early life and junior career ==
Zhilkin was born in Moscow, Russia and later moved to Canada to pursue his hockey development. He was selected in the first round (14th overall) of the 2019 OHL Priority Selection draft. He played major junior hockey in the Ontario Hockey League (OHL) with the Guelph Storm and Kitchener Rangers, tallying 96 points in 151 games for the Storm and 17 goals in 35 games for the Rangers. Zhilkin was named an alternate captain for Guelph in 2022-23. He was selected by the Winnipeg Jets in the third round (77th overall) of the 2022 NHL Entry Draft.

Zhilkin won a gold medal with Team Canada at the 2021 U18 World Championship, and represented Team Canada at the U17 tournament as well. He has chosen to represent Canada internationally, despite being born and raised in Russia. Zhilkin played for Team Ontario at the 2015 Canada Winter Games, earning a silver medal after losing to Quebec in the finals.

== Professional career ==
After signing with the Winnipeg Jets organization, Zhilkin spent time developing with their AHL affiliate, the Manitoba Moose. During the 2025–26 season, he posted a career-best line with 14 points in 30 games before his recall to the NHL. On January 8, 2026, Zhilkin made his NHL debut with the Winnipeg Jets in a game against the Edmonton Oilers. He was loaned back to the Moose after playing 4 games with the Jets, and scored the game-tying goal against the Grand Rapids Griffins in his second game back from his stint in the NHL.

== Personal life ==
Zhilkin is in a public relationship with his long-time girlfriend, Lauren Shoss. Shoss is a doctoral student studying clinical and school psychology at James Madison University and works for the Toronto Blue Jays as a mental performance specialist in amateur scouting. The two run a non-profit organization, Zhilkin's Vision, which raises awareness about mental health in sport. Danny Zhilkin's younger brother, Dima Zhilkin, is a winger for the OHL's Saginaw Spirit and is projected to be a high NHL draft pick in 2027.
