= Brooks Rogowski =

American ice hockey player (born 2008)

- Born: June 24, 2008 (age 18) Brighton, Michigan, U.S.
- Height: 6 ft 7 in (201 cm)
- Weight: 235 lb (107 kg; 16 st 11 lb)
- Position: Forward
- Shoots: Right
- OHL team: Oshawa Generals
- NHL draft: 33rd overall, 2026; Vancouver Canucks

Brooks Rogowski (born June 24, 2008) is an American junior ice hockey forward for the Oshawa Generals of the Ontario Hockey League (OHL) as a prospect to the Vancouver Canucks of the National Hockey League (NHL). He was drafted 33rd overall by the Canucks in the 2026 NHL entry draft.

== Playing career ==
Rogowski attended Detroit Catholic Central High School. During the 2023–24 season, he recorded 19 goals and 24 assists and helped the Shamrocks win their fifth consecutive MHSAA Division 1 title. He was selected in the second round, 38th overall, by the Oshawa Generals in the 2024 OHL Priority Selection Draft. On May 23, 2024, he signed with the Generals. During the 2024–25 season, he recorded 11 goals and 12 assists in 66 regular season games. During the 2025–26 season, he recorded 15 goals and 27 assists in 46 games.

Rogowski has committed to play college ice hockey for Michigan State during the 2027–28 season.

Rogowski was taken by the Vancouver Canucks with the first pick of the second round of the 2026 NHL entry draft.

== International play ==
Rogowski represented the United States at the 2025 Hlinka Gretzky Cup where he recorded one goals and two assists in five games and won a gold medal.

== Personal life ==
Rogowski's father, Casey, was drafted by the Chicago White Sox, while his uncle Ryan was selected by the Los Angeles Dodgers.

== Career statistics ==
			Regular season					Playoffs
Season	Team	League	GP	G	A	Pts	PIM	GP	G	A	Pts	PIM
2024–25	Oshawa Generals	OHL	66	11	12	23	9	19	3	3	6	0
2025–26	Oshawa Generals	OHL	46	15	27	42	17	—	—	—	—	—
OHL totals			112	26	39	65	26	19	3	3	6	0
