= Pyry Lammi =

Finnish ice hockey player

- Born: 5 February 2008 (age 18) Ikaalinen, Finland
- Height: 177 cm (5 ft 10 in)
- Weight: 65 kg (143 lb; 10 st 3 lb)
- Position: Goaltender
- Catches: Left
- Liiga team: HC Ässät Pori
- National team: Finland
- NHL draft: Eligible 2026
- Playing career: 2024–present

Pyry Lammi (born 5 February 2008) is a Finnish ice hockey goaltender currently playing for HC Ässät Pori of the Finnish Elite League.

Lammi has represented Finland in the junior national team, appearing in the Youth Olympic Games for the country.

== Career ==
On 18 April 2024, Pyry Lammi signed his first professional contract with the HC Ässät Pori at 16 years old, signing a three-year contract. He made his senior debut for the club at 16 years old in the Pitsiturnaus tournament against JYP Jyväskylä.

== International play ==
Lammi was chosen to the Finnish Ice Hockey Association's Pohjola Camp roster in 2023. He played for Finland at the 2024 Winter Youth Olympics, winning the bronze medal of the tournament.

== Career statistics ==
=== International ===
| Year | Team | Event | Result | GP | W | L | OT | MIN | GA | SO | GAA | SV% |
|---|---|---|---|---|---|---|---|---|---|---|---|---|
| 2024 | Finland | YOG | 3rd place, bronze medalist(s) | 2 | 1 | 1 | 0 | 82 | 5 | 0 | 2.49 | 93.1 |
| Junior totals | | | | 2 | 1 | 1 | 0 | 82 | 5 | 0 | 2.49 | 93.1 |
| Senior totals | | | | — | — | — | — | — | — | — | — | — |
