= Pavol Demitra Ice Stadium =

Slovak stadium

Coordinates: 48.9005699°N 18.0571032°E

Zimný štadión Pavla Demitru
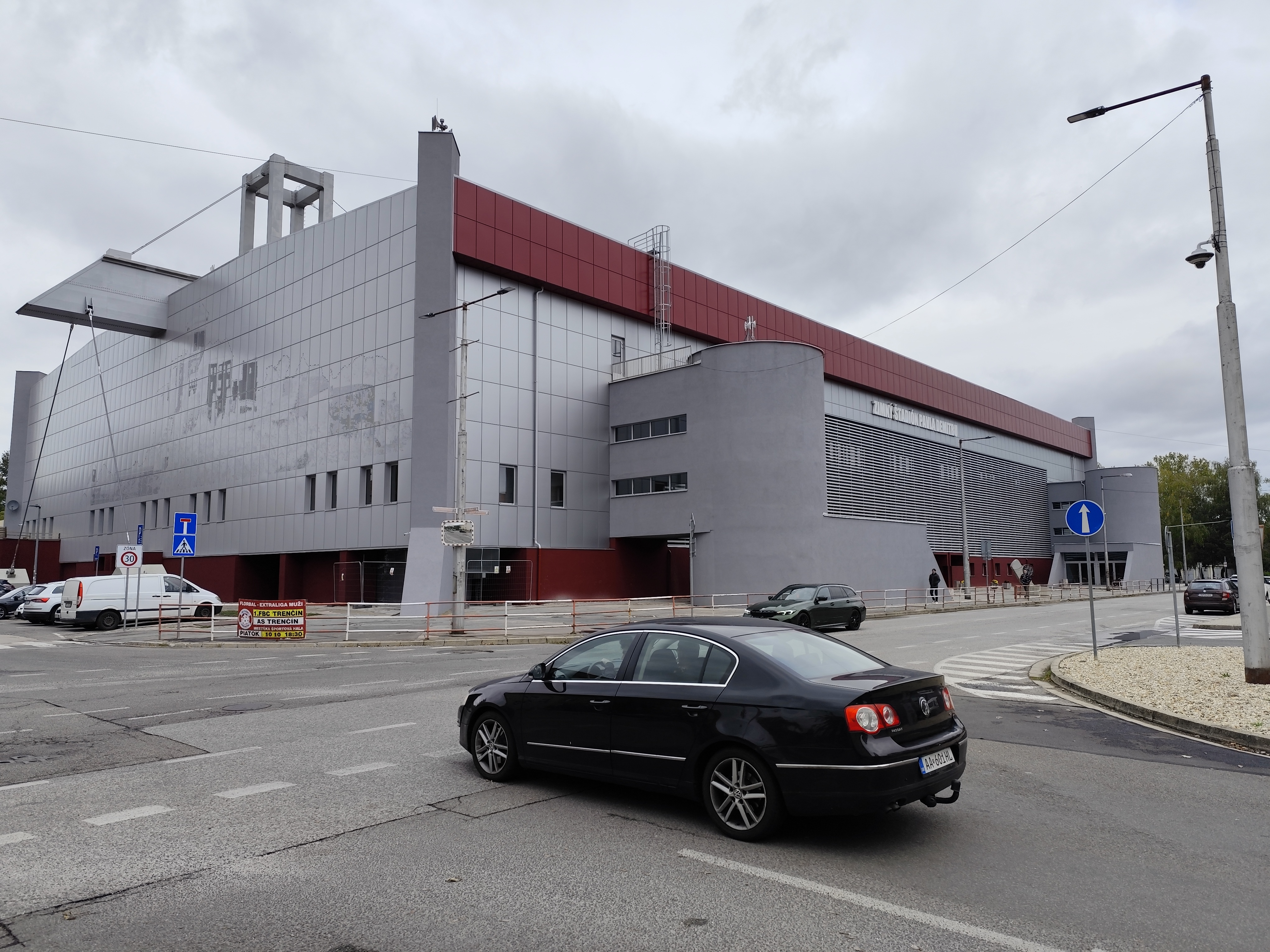
- the arena in October 2025
- Interactive map of Zimný štadión Pavla Demitru
- Former names: B.O.F Aréna
- Location: Trenčín, Slovakia
- Operator: City of Trenčín
- Capacity: 6,300 (ice hockey)

Construction
- Built: 1960
- Opened: January 17, 1960

Tenant
- Dukla Trenčín (Slovak Extraliga)

Pavol Demitra Ice Stadium (Slovak: Zimný Štadión Pavla Demitru) and formerly B.O.F. Arena, is an arena in Trenčín, Slovakia. The stadium is primarily used for ice hockey, and is the home arena of the Slovak Extraliga club, HK Dukla Trenčín. It has a capacity of 6,300 spectators and was built in 1960.

The arena is named after the professional ice hockey player, a three-time National Hockey League All-Star, Pavol Demitra. The name change occurred in 2011 after the 2011 Lokomotiv Yaroslavl plane crash on 7 September 2011, which killed Demitra and the rest of the Lokomotiv team.

== Notable events ==
An overview of some sport events:

1987

- 1987 IIHF World Under-20 Championship
