= Mathis Preston =

Canadian ice hockey player (born 2008)

- Born: July 21, 2008 (age 18) Penticton, British Columbia, Canada
- Height: 5 ft 11 in (180 cm)
- Weight: 173 lb (78 kg; 12 st 5 lb)
- Position: Centre
- Shoots: Right
- WHL team: Vancouver Giants
- NHL draft: 50th overall, 2026; Anaheim Ducks

Mathis Preston (born July 21, 2008) is a Canadian ice hockey centre for the Vancouver Giants of the Western Hockey League (WHL).

== Playing career ==
Preston started playing ice hockey at age three for Penticton Minor. He was a member of Penticton Minor until age 12, when he joined Okanagan Hockey Academy. He began playing for the Okanagan under-15 varsity team in 2020–21. Preston was a member of the Okanagan under-15 prep team in 2021–22 and 2022–23, scoring 81 points in 26 games in the latter year while being named the division's most valuable player. In 2023, he was selected third overall by the Spokane Chiefs in the Western Hockey League (WHL) Prospects Draft.

Not eligible to play immediately for the Chiefs due to his age, Preston played most of the 2023–24 season with the Okanagan U18 prep team, scoring 51 points in 23 games. Overall, in four seasons for Okanagan Hockey Academy, Preston appeared in 106 games and scored 135 goals and 235 points. He appeared in a total of five games for the Chiefs in 2023–24 at age 15, scoring four points. In his first full WHL season, 2024–25, he scored 23 goals and 45 points while appearing in 54 games. He helped the Chiefs to an appearance in the WHL finals and scored nine goals and seven assists while appearing in 20 playoff games.

Preston was regarded as a potential first-round pick in the 2026 NHL entry draft. Ultimately, he would not be selected until the second round, when he was selected with the 50th overall pick by the Anaheim Ducks.

== International play ==
Preston competed for Canada at the 2024 World U-17 Hockey Challenge, helping them to the gold medal while posting six goals which ranked first in the tournament. In 2025, he participated at the Hlinka Gretzky Cup and won the bronze medal.

== Career statistics ==
| | | | Regular season | | | | | Playoffs |
| Season | Team | League | GP | G | A | Pts | PIM | GP | G | A | Pts | PIM |
|---|---|---|---|---|---|---|---|---|---|---|---|---|
| 2023–24 | Spokane Chiefs | WHL | 5 | 4 | 0 | 4 | 6 | 3 | 0 | 0 | 0 | 4 |
| 2024–25 | Spokane Chiefs | WHL | 54 | 23 | 22 | 45 | 24 | 20 | 9 | 7 | 16 | 4 |
| 2025–26 | Spokane Chiefs | WHL | 36 | 14 | 18 | 32 | 32 | — | — | — | — | — |
| 2025–26 | Vancouver Giants | WHL | 10 | 4 | 8 | 12 | 2 | — | — | — | — | — |
| WHL totals | | | 105 | 45 | 48 | 93 | 64 | 23 | 9 | 7 | 16 | 8 |

== Personal life ==
Preston was born on July 21, 2008, in Penticton, British Columbia. He grew up in Penticton and competed in basketball, lacrosse and triathlon in addition to hockey. He has a brother, Nathan, who also plays hockey, and has been friends since childhood with Pittsburgh Penguins prospects Liam and Markus Ruck, who were drafted shortly before Preston.
