= 2025 Hlinka Gretzky Cup =

U18 international ice hockey tournament

Tournament details
- Host countries: Czech Republic; Slovakia
- Venues: 2 (in 2 host cities)
- Dates: 11–16 August 2025
- Teams: 8

Final positions
- Champions: United States (2nd title)
- Runners-up: Sweden
- Third place: Canada
- Fourth place: Finland

Tournament statistics
- Games played: 12
- Goals scored: 87 (7.25 per game)
- Scoring leader: (Sweden) Marcus Nordmark (9 points)

Official website
- hlinkagretzky.cz

The 2025 Hlinka Gretzky Cup was an under-18 international ice hockey tournament held from 11 to 16 August 2025 at Winning Group Arena in Brno, Czechia, and Pavol Demitra Ice Stadium in Trenčín, Slovakia.

The United States defeated Sweden to win their first gold medal since 2003.

== Preliminary round ==
All times are local (UTC+2).

=== Group A ===
Pos	Team	Pld	W	OTW	OTL	L	GF	GA	GD	Pts	Qualification
1	Canada	3	3	0	0	0	19	4	+15	9	Semifinals
2	Finland	3	1	0	1	1	10	10	0	4	Semifinals
3	Czech Republic (H)	3	1	0	0	2	7	11	−4	3	Fifth place game
4	Switzerland	3	0	1	0	2	7	18	−11	2	Seventh place game

Source: hockeyslovakia.sk
(H) Host

11 August 2025; 15:30 UTC+2	Canada	5–3 (2–2, 1–0, 2–1)	Finland	Winning Group Arena, Brno; Attendance: 1,049

Game reference

Gavin Betts
Goalies
William Gammals

Beckham Edwards – 00:58	1–0
Keaton Verhoeff – 08:55	2–0
	2–1	Oscar Hemming – 14:01
	2–2	Jiko Laitinen – 19:25
Ryan Lin – 39:52	3–2
Dimian Zhilkin – 48:19	4–2
	4–3	Vilho Vanhatalo – 56:15
Ethan Belchetz – 59:55	5–3

16 min
Penalties
6 min
39
Shots
26

11 August 2025; 19:00 UTC+2	Czech Republic	6–2 (1–1, 4–1, 1–0)	Switzerland	Winning Group Arena, Brno; Attendance: 1,643

Game reference

Martin Psohlavec
Goalies
Pascal Kunz

	0–1	Tim Münger – 7:12
Jiří Kamas – 11:09	1–1
Šimon Bělohorský – 22:28	2–1
Lukáš Kachlíř – 28:18	3–1
Pilip Novák – 30:22	4–1
Šimon Bělohorský – 34:05	5–1
	5–2	Philip Moser – 34:56
Lukáš Kachlíř – 49:20	6–2

8 min
Penalties
16 min
48
Shots
16

12 August 2025; 15:30 UTC+2	Switzerland	1–9 (0–0, 0–1, 1–8)	Canada	Winning Group Arena, Brno; Attendance: 986

Game reference

Yannis Zambelli
Goalies
Carter Esler

	0–1	Dimian Zhilkin – 20:08
	0–2	Mathis Preston – 46:18
	0–3	Dimian Zhilkin – 46:38
	0–4	Adam Valentini – 47:02
	0–5	Mathis Preston – 48:40
Fabrice Bouvard – 53:14	1–5
	1–6	Mathis Preston – 53:59
	1–7	Adam Valentini – 55:04
	1–8	Ethan Belchetz – 57:33
	1–9	Ryan Lin – 59:25

10 min
Penalties
8 min
15
Shots
45

12 August 2025; 19:00 UTC+2	Czech Republic	1–4 (0–0, 0–2, 1–2)	Finland	Winning Group Arena, Brno; Attendance: 1,905

Game reference

Frantisek Poletin
Goalies
William Gammals

	0–1	Oscar Hemming – 24:59
	0–2	Luka Arkko – 33:36
Petr Tomek – 53:22	1–2
	1–3	Oliver Suvanto – 55:20
	1–4	Luka Arrko – 56:19

16 min
Penalties
14 min
27
Shots
30

13 August 2025; 15:30 UTC+2	Finland	3–4 OT (0–0, 1–1, 2–2); OT: (0–1)	Switzerland	Winning Group Arena, Brno; Attendance: ~1,000

Game reference

Aarni Riihimäki
Goalies
Pascal Kunz

	0–1	Yanis Lutz – 20:28
Jiko Laitinen – 22:38	1–1
Oscar Hemming – 50:34	2–1
	2–2	Lou Bächler – 56:45
	2–3	Thierry Berger – 57:53
Rasmus Rinne – 59:09	3–3
	3–4	Sol Fueter – 63:05

4 min
Penalties
14 min
37
Shots
22

13 August 2025; 20:00 UTC+2	Czech Republic	0–5 (0–1, 0–0, 0–4)	Canada	Winning Group Arena, Brno; Attendance: ~2,000

Game reference

Frantisek Poletin
Goalies
Givin Betts

0–1	Liam Ruck – 11:59
0–2	Beckham Edwards – 51:39
0–3	Daxon Rudolph – 54:51
0–4	Liam Ruck – 56:55
0–5	Alessandro Di Lorio – 59:29

6 min
Penalties
33 min
23
Shots
35

=== Group B ===
Pos	Team	Pld	W	OTW	OTL	L	GF	GA	GD	Pts	Qualification
1	Sweden	3	3	0	0	0	22	3	+19	9	Semifinals
2	United States	3	2	0	0	1	17	9	+8	6	Semifinals
3	Slovakia (H)	3	1	0	0	2	4	13	−9	3	Fifth place game
4	Germany	3	0	0	0	3	1	19	−18	0	Seventh place game

Source: hockeyslovakia.sk
(H) Host

11 August 2025; 15:30 UTC+2	Germany	0–10 (0–4, 0–1, 0–5)	Sweden	Pavol Demitra Ice Stadium, Trenčín; Attendance: 853

Game reference

Max Bolle
Goalies
Milo Tjärnlund

0–1	Max Isaksson – 8:47
0–2	Olle Karlsson – 9:37
0–3	Mikael Kim – 14:29
0–4	Marcus Nordmark – 15:45
0–5	Oscar Holmertz – 30:52
0–6	Elton Hermansson – 41:45
0–7	Nils Bartholdsson – 45:45
0–8	Oscar Holmertz – 47:31
0–9	Mikael Kim – 56:18
0–10	Mans Josbrant – 58:07

8 min
Penalties
8 min
20
Shots
57

11 August 2025; 19:00 UTC+2	Slovakia	3–6 (1–1, 1–2, 1–3)	United States	Pavol Demitra Ice Stadium, Trenčín; Attendance: 3,258

Game reference

Samuel Hrenak
Goalies
Brady Knowling

	0–1	Kalder Varga – 04:21
Oliver Ozogány – 04:51	1–1
	1–2	Levi Harper – 23:04
Oliver Ozogány – 38:01	2–2
	2–3	Blake Zielinski – 39:36
Oliver Ozogány – 49:27	3–3
	3–4	Noah Davidson – 58:20
	3–5	Brooks Rogowski – 58:56
	3–6	Nick Bogas – 59:36

8 min
Penalties
12 min
25
Shots
38

12 August 2025; 15:30 UTC+2	Sweden	5–3 (0–2, 2–1, 3–0)	United States	Pavol Demitra Ice Stadium, Trenčín; Attendance: 1,468

Game reference

Douglas Nilsson
Goalies
Kaenan Smith

	0–1	Shaeffer Gordon Carroll – 01:57
	0–2	Levi Harper – 16:41
Marcus Nordmark – 22:31	1–2
	1–3	Blake Zielinski – 24:19
Bosse Meijer – 37:05	2–3
Malte Gustafsson – 46:59	3–3
Mikael Kim – 47:28	4–3
Elton Hermansson – 48:25	5–3

16 min
Penalties
16 min
33
Shots
41

12 August 2025; 19:00 UTC+2	Slovakia	1–0 (0–0, 0–0, 1–0)	Germany	Pavol Demitra Ice Stadium, Trenčín; Attendance: 2,861

Game reference
Denis Celko	Goalies	Anton Röckl
Matej Stankoven – 58:48 / 1–0
12 min	Penalties	12 min
44	Shots	22

13 August 2025; 15:30 UTC+2	United States	8–1 (3–0, 2–0, 3–1)	Germany	Pavol Demitra Ice Stadium, Trenčín; Attendance: 859

Game reference

Aidan Hesse
Goalies
Sascha Pitaev

Zaide Penner – 2:14	1–0
Caden Harvey – 3:49	2–0
Jack Hextall – 04:45	3–0
Levi Harper – 21:26	4–0
Nolan Duskocy – 30:56	5–0
Kalder Varga – 42:37	6–0
Blake Zielinski – 45:03	7–0
Caden Harvey – 45:26	8–0
	8–1	Jack Peterka – 52:15

8 min
Penalties
6 min
48
Shots
19

13 August 2025; 19:00	Slovakia	0–7 (0–2, 0–2, 0–3)	Sweden	Pavol Demitra Ice Stadium, Trenčín; Attendance: 3,148

Game reference

Samuel Hrenak
Goalies
Milo Tjärnlund

0–1	Malte Gustafsson – 05:31
0–2	Nils Bartholdsson – 16:21
0–3	Marcus Nordmark – 24:04
0–4	Elton Hermansson – 28:02
0–5	Isak Holtet – 43:09
0–6	Elton Hermansson – 57:40
0–7	Marcus Nordmark – 58:48

12 min
Penalties
14 min
26
Shots
37

== Final round ==
=== Bracket ===
Semifinals
15 August – Brno
A1 Canada	3
B2 United States (SO)	4
15 August – Trenčín
B1 Sweden (OT)	6
A2 Finland	5

Final
16 August – Trenčín
B2 United States	5
B1 Sweden	3
Third place
16 August – Trenčín
A1 Canada	3
A2 Finland	0

5th place game
15 August – Brno
A3 Czech Republic	5
B3 Slovakia	2

7th place game
15 August – Trenčín
A4 Switzerland	5
B4 Germany	2

=== Seventh place game ===
15 August 2025; 15:30 UTC+2	Switzerland	5–2; 2–0, 1–2, 2–0	Germany	Pavol Demitra Ice Stadium, Trenčín

Game reference

Yannis Zambelli
Goalies
Max Bolle

Niclas Rentsch – 7:00	1–0
Clemens Troxler – 9:07	2–0
Fabrice Bouvard – 20:28	3–0
	3–1	Karl Wolfsteiner – 30:36
	3–2	Luis Becker – 37:47
Niclas Rentsch – 59:24	4–2
Sol Fueter – 59:55	5–2

16 min
Penalties
12 min
37
Shots
33

=== Fifth place game ===
15 August 2025; 15:30 UTC+2	Czech Republic	5–2 (2–0, 1–1, 2–1)	Slovakia	Winning Group Arena, Brno

Game reference

Marek Sklenička
Goalies
Denis Čelko

Vojtěch Švancar – 1:47	1–0
Jiři Kamas – 18:33	2–0
	2–1	Oliver Ozogány – 25:19
Petr Tomek – 32:15	3–1
Jiři Maxa – 48:01	4–1
Jiři Kamas – 52:44	5–1
	5–2	Matúš Lukáčik – 54:44

12 min
Penalties
14 min
42
Shots
28

=== Semifinals ===
15 August 2025; 19:00 UTC+2	Canada	3–4 SO	United States	Winning Group Arena, Brno

15 August 2025; 19:00 UTC+2	Sweden	6–5 OT	Finland	Pavol Demitra Ice Stadium, Trenčín

=== Bronze medal game ===
16 August 2025; 16:00 UTC+2	Canada	3–0	Finland	Pavol Demitra Ice Stadium, Trenčín

=== Final ===
16 August 2025; 16:00 UTC+2	Sweden	3–5 (2–3, 1–1, 0–1)	United States	Pavol Demitra Ice Stadium, Trenčín; Attendance: 1,112

Game reference

Milo Tjärnlund
Goalies
Brady Knowling

Hermansson (Meijer, Elofsson) – 00:10	1–0
	1–1	02:53 – Harper
	1–2	03:57 – Davidson (Hextall, McLaughlin) (PP)
Zirath (Knights, Bartholdsson) – 06:28	2–2
	2–3	17:12 – Hextall (Zielinski, Klepov) (PP)
	2–4	20:45 – Klepov (Zielinski, Hextall) (PP)
Hermansson (Holmertz, Meijer) (PP) – 37:58	3–4
	3–5	57:34 – Bogas (Harper, Puchner) (PP)

8 min
Penalties
5 min
29
Shots
35

== Statistics ==
=== Scoring leaders ===
Pos	Player	Country	GP	G	A	Pts	PIM
1	Marcus Nordmark	Sweden	3	4	5	9	2
2	Elton Hermansson	Sweden	3	4	3	7	2
3	Blake Zielinski	United States	3	3	3	6	0
4	Axel Elofsson	Sweden	3	0	6	6	2
5	Mathis Preston	Canada	3	3	2	5	0
6	Adam Valentini	Canada	3	2	3	5	0
6	Ethan Belchetz	Canada	3	2	3	5	0
6	Malte Gustafsson	Sweden	3	2	3	5	0
6	Nils Bartholdsson	Sweden	3	2	3	5	2
10	Max Isaksson	Sweden	3	1	4	5	4

GP = Games played; G = Goals; A = Assists; Pts = Points; PIM = Penalties In Minutes
Source: [hockeyczechia.cz]

=== Goaltending leaders ===
(minimum 40% team's total ice time)

Pos	Player	Country	TOI	GA	GAA	SA	Sv%	SO
1	Milo Tjärnlund	Sweden	120	0	0	46	100.00	2
2	Gavin Betts	Canada	120	3	1.5	49	93.99	1
3	Denis Čelko	Slovakia	92	3	1.96	41	92.68	1
4	Sascha Pitaev	Germany	120	9	4.5	94	90.43	0
5	František Poletín	Czech Republic	119	8	4.03	64	87.50	0

TOI = Time on ice (minutes:seconds); GA = Goals against; GAA = Goals against average; SA = Shots against; Sv% = Save percentage; SO = Shutouts
Source: [hockeyczechia.cz]
