= 2024 World U-17 Hockey Challenge =

Tournament details
- Host country: Canada
- Venue: 1 (in 1 host city)
- Dates: November 1–9, 2024

Final positions
- Champions: Canada White (3rd title)
- Runners-up: Canada Red
- Third place: Sweden
- Fourth place: United States

Tournament statistics
- Scoring leader(s): (Canada) White Mathis Preston; Adam Valentini (9 points)

The 2024 World Under-17 Hockey Challenge was an ice hockey tournament that was held in Sarnia, Ontario, Canada from November 1 to 9, 2024. It was the 31st edition of the tournament.

== Venues ==
Sarnia, Ontario, Canada was the tournament host. It was previously the host of the tournament in 2014.

Sarnia	2024 World U-17 Hockey Challenge is located in Canada
Progressive Auto Sales Arena Capacity: 4,118	2024 World U-17 Hockey Challenge is located in Canada

== Preliminary round ==
=== Group A ===
Team	Pld	W	OTW	OTL	L	GF	GA	GD	Pts
Canada Red	2	2	0	0	0	9	4	+5	6
United States	2	1	0	0	1	8	9	−1	3
Finland	2	0	0	0	2	4	8	−4	0

Source: https://www.hockeycanada.ca/en-ca/national-championships/men/world-u17/2024/schedule-results/stats/schedule

==== Results ====
November 3, 2024	Finland	1 – 3	Canada Red	Progressive Auto Sales Arena, Sarnia

November 4, 2024	Canada Red	6 – 3	United States	Progressive Auto Sales Arena, Sarnia

November 5, 2024	United States	5 – 3	Finland	Progressive Auto Sales Arena, Sarnia

=== Group B ===
Team	Pld	W	OTW	OTL	L	GF	GA	GD	Pts
Sweden	2	1	1	0	0	10	7	+3	5
Canada White	2	1	0	1	0	10	7	+3	4
Czech Republic	2	0	0	0	2	5	11	−6	0

Source: https://www.hockeycanada.ca/en-ca/national-championships/men/world-u17/2024/schedule-results/stats/schedule

==== Results ====
November 3, 2024	Canada White	6 – 2	Czech Republic	Progressive Auto Sales Arena, Sarnia

November 4, 2024	Czech Republic	3 – 5	Sweden	Progressive Auto Sales Arena, Sarnia

November 5, 2024	Sweden	5 – 4 OT	Canada White	Progressive Auto Sales Arena, Sarnia

== Playoff round ==
Quarterfinals
B2	Canada White	4
A3	Finland	2
A2	United States (OT)	4
B3	Czech Republic	3

Semifinals
B1	Sweden	4
B2	Canada White	6
A1	Canada Red	7
A2	United States	3

Final
B2	Canada White	3
A1	Canada Red	1
Bronze medal game
B1	Sweden (OT)	5
A2	United States	4
