= Marcus Nordmark =

Swedish ice hockey player (born 2008)

- Born: 4 May 2008 (age 18) Stockholm, Sweden
- Height: 187 cm (6 ft 2 in)
- Weight: 81.65 kg (180 lb; 12 st 12 lb)
- Position: Winger
- Shoots: Left
- SHL team: Djurgårdens IF
- NHL draft: 28th overall, 2026; Anaheim Ducks
- Playing career: 2025–present

Marcus Nordmark (born 4 May 2008) is a Swedish professional ice hockey player who is a winger for Djurgårdens IF of the Swedish Hockey League (SHL). He was drafted 28th overall by the Anaheim Ducks in the 2026 NHL entry draft.

== Playing career ==
Nordmark began playing hockey in local club IFK Täby HC. He joined the junior organisation of Djurgårdens IF for the 2024–25 season. He went on to win the Swedish championship at both the J18 and U20 levels the same season. He made his Swedish Hockey League debut on 22 December 2025, in an away game against HV71. Nordmark extended his contract with Djurgården for two years in May 2026.

== International play ==
Medal record

Men's ice hockey

Representing Sweden

World U18 Championships
Gold medal – first place	2026 Slovakia	

Nordmark was Sweden's best player at the 2025 Hlinka Gretzky Cup, scoring seven goals and 12 points in five games.

== Personal life ==
Nordmark's father is Robert Nordmark, a defenseman who played for the St. Louis Blues and Vancouver Canucks and won gold medals for Sweden at the 1981 World Junior Ice Hockey Championships and the 1987 Ice Hockey World Championships.

Awards and achievements
Preceded by Nikita Klepov	Anaheim Ducks first-round draft pick 2026	Succeeded by Incumbent
