= Anaheim Ducks =

National Hockey League team in Anaheim, California

- 2026–27 Anaheim Ducks season
- Conference: Western
- Division: Pacific
- Founded: 1993
- History: Mighty Ducks of Anaheim; 1993–2006; Anaheim Ducks; 2006–present
- Home arena: Honda Center
- City: Anaheim, California
- Team colors: Orange, gold, black, white
- Media: Amazon Prime Video; KCOP (Fox 11 Plus); KTTV (Fox 11); Ducks Stream on TuneIn
- Owner(s): The Walt Disney Company (1993-2005); Henry & Susan Samueli (2005-present)
- General manager: Pat Verbeek
- Head coach: Joel Quenneville
- Captain: Mikael Granlund
- Minor league affiliates: San Diego Gulls (AHL); Tulsa Oilers (ECHL)
- Stanley Cups: 1 (2006–07)
- Conference championships: 2 (2002–03, 2006–07)
- Presidents' Trophies: 0
- Division championships: 6 (2006–07, 2012–13, 2013–14, 2014–15, 2015–16, 2016–17)
- Official website: nhl.com/ducks

The Anaheim Ducks are a professional ice hockey team based in Anaheim, California. The Ducks compete in the National Hockey League (NHL) as a member of the Pacific Division in the Western Conference. The team plays its home games at Honda Center, and is owned by Henry and Susan Samueli. The Ducks are affiliated with the San Diego Gulls of the American Hockey League (AHL) and the Tulsa Oilers of the ECHL.

The Ducks were founded as an expansion team for the 1993–94 season by the Walt Disney Company, and were known as the Mighty Ducks of Anaheim, a name based on the 1992 film The Mighty Ducks. In 2005, Disney sold the franchise to the Samuelis, who, along with then-general manager Brian Burke, changed the name of the team to the Anaheim Ducks before the 2006–07 season. The Ducks have won six Pacific Division championships, and have advanced to the Stanley Cup Final twice, losing to the New Jersey Devils in 2003, and winning the Stanley Cup in 2007 over the Ottawa Senators, becoming the first of the three California-based teams to win the Stanley Cup. The Ducks have produced two Conn Smythe Trophy winners as the most valuable player of the playoffs – Jean-Sébastien Giguère in 2003 and Scott Niedermayer in 2007.

== History ==
=== Start of a franchise (1993–1994) ===
The Mighty Ducks of Anaheim were founded in 1993 by The Walt Disney Company. The franchise was awarded by the NHL in December 1992, alongside the rights to a Miami team founded by Wayne Huizenga that would become the Florida Panthers. An entrance fee of $50 million was required, half of which Disney would pay directly to the Los Angeles Kings in order to "share" the Los Angeles media market. On March 1, 1993, at the brand-new Anaheim Arena, the team's name was announced. The name was inspired by The Mighty Ducks, a 1992 Disney film about a struggling youth hockey team that, with the help of their new coach, become champions. Philadelphia arena management specialist Tony Tavares was chosen to be team president, and Jack Ferreira, who previously helped create the San Jose Sharks, became the Ducks' general manager. The Ducks selected Ron Wilson to be the first head coach in team history. The Ducks and Florida Panthers filled out their rosters in the 1993 NHL expansion draft and the 1993 NHL entry draft. In the former, a focus on defense led to goaltenders Guy Hebert and Glenn Healy being the first picks, followed by Alexei Kasatonov and Steven King. In the latter, the Ducks selected Paul Kariya with the fourth overall pick, who began playing in 1994 and would turn out to be the face of the franchise for many years. The resulting roster had the lowest payroll of the NHL at only $7.9 million.

Led by Troy Loney, who was the captain at the time, the Ducks finished the 1993–94 season 33–46–5, a record-breaking number of wins for an expansion team, which the Florida Panthers also achieved. The Ducks sold out 27 of 41 home games, including the last 25, and filled the Arrowhead Pond to 98.9% of its season capacity. The Ducks licensed merchandise shot to number one in sales among NHL clubs, helped by their presence from Disney's theme parks and Disney Stores.

=== Paul Kariya era (1994–2003) ===
The lockout-shortened 1994–95 season saw the debut of Kariya, who would play 47 games that year, scoring 18 goals and 21 assists for 39 points. For his efforts, he was named a finalist for the Calder Memorial Trophy for the top rookie of the year. The Ducks went 16–27–5, missing the playoffs.

During the 1995–96 season, Kariya was chosen to play for the Western Conference in the 1996 NHL All-Star Game as the lone Ducks representative, playing in place of Pavel Bure, who was out with a knee injury. Following the All-Star Game, the Mighty Ducks completed a mid-season blockbuster deal with the Winnipeg Jets. The Ducks sent Chad Kilger, Oleg Tverdovsky, and a third-round pick to the Jets in return for forward Marc Chouinard, a fourth-round draft pick, and right winger Teemu Selänne. Following the trade, Ducks center Steve Rucchin commented, "Paul [Kariya] had a lot of pressure on him... He single-handedly won some games for us this year... Now that we have Teemu, there's no way everybody can just key on Paul." These three players formed one of the most potent lines of their time. However, the Mighty Ducks lost the eighth spot in the Western Conference to the Winnipeg Jets based on the number of wins.

During the 1996–97 season, Kariya became team captain following Randy Ladouceur's retirement in the off-season. The Ducks qualified for the postseason after recording the franchise's first winning record of 36–33–13, good enough for home ice in the first round as the fourth seed against the Phoenix Coyotes. The Ducks trailed 3–2 in the series going into Phoenix for game six. Kariya scored in overtime to force the franchise's first game seven, which they won. However, in the second round, they lost to the eventual Stanley Cup champions, the Detroit Red Wings, in a four-game sweep. After the season, Ron Wilson was fired for philosophical differences. Pierre Pagé succeeded him. The Ducks started out slowly in 1997–98, in part because Kariya missed the first 32 games of the season in a contract dispute. He came back in December, but on February 1, he suffered a season-ending concussion when Gary Suter, the defenseman for the Chicago Blackhawks, cross-checked him in the face. With Kariya playing only a total of 22 games that season, the Ducks missed the playoffs and fired Page. The Ducks followed that season up by finishing sixth in the Western Conference in 1998–99 with new head coach Craig Hartsburg. However, they were swept by Detroit again, this time in the first round.

At training camp prior to the 1999–2000 season, the Ducks made a motto, "Take the next step," going into the season. However, due to a much more competitive Western Conference, they missed the playoffs by four points behind rival San Jose Sharks. In the following season, 2000–01, the Ducks ended up performing worse, as Kariya and Selänne's point production significantly declined from the previous season – Kariya went from 86 points to 67 points and Selänne went from 85 points to 57 points. Selänne was subsequently dealt to San Jose at the trade deadline for Jeff Friesen, Steve Shields and a second-round draft pick, while head coach Craig Hartsburg was fired during the season. The team ended up with a losing record and last place in the Western Conference that season. Without Selänne, Kariya's numbers continued to drop in the 2001–02 season with new coach Bryan Murray. The Mighty Ducks finished in 13th place in the Western Conference.

==== Western Conference champions (2002–2003) ====
Prior to the 2002–03 season, Bryan Murray was promoted to general manager. He hired Mike Babcock to be the head coach. The Mighty Ducks made the postseason as the seventh seed with a 40–27–9–6 record, good enough for 95 points. In the first round, the Ducks were once again matched up with the Detroit Red Wings, the defending Stanley Cup champions. They swept the Red Wings in four games. Steve Rucchin scored the series-winning goal in overtime in game four. In the second round, the Ducks faced the Dallas Stars. Game one turned out to be one of the longest games in NHL history, with Petr Sýkora scoring in the fifth overtime to give the Mighty Ducks the series lead. The Ducks finished off the Stars in game six at home. In the team's first trip to the Western Conference finals, they were matched up against the sixth-seeded, three-year-old Minnesota Wild. Jean-Sébastien Giguère strung together three consecutive shutouts and allowed only one total goal in the series in an eventual sweep.

The 2003 Stanley Cup Final was played against the New Jersey Devils. The series began with the home team winning the first five games. In game six at home, Kariya was knocked unconscious from a hit by Devils captain Scott Stevens. However, Kariya returned in the second period and scored the fourth goal of the game. The Mighty Ducks defeated the Devils, 5–2, to send the series back to New Jersey for game seven. Anaheim was unable to win on the road in New Jersey, as they lost game seven to the Devils, 3–0. For his play during the postseason, Giguère was awarded the Conn Smythe Trophy as the most valuable player (MVP) of the playoffs. He became only the fifth player in NHL history to win the trophy as a member of the losing team.

=== New ownership, Selänne's return and franchise rebrand (2003–2008) ===
After the 2002–03 season, Kariya promised to bring the Mighty Ducks back to the Stanley Cup Final the following year. However, Kariya left the Ducks in the summer and joined former teammate Teemu Selänne on the Colorado Avalanche. During the 2003–04 season, the team regressed to a 29–35–10–8 record, finishing fourth in the division.

During the 2004 off-season, Bryan Murray, who had wished to coach again, left the Ducks to join the Ottawa Senators. As the NHL and the National Hockey League Players' Association (NHLPA)'s labor dispute was headed towards a long lockout, Disney tried to sell the team but received a low offer of US$50 million, less than the franchise's original price. In 2005, Broadcom Corporation co-founder Henry Samueli of Irvine, California, and his wife Susan bought the Mighty Ducks from The Walt Disney Company for a reported US$75 million. Henry Samuelis, whose family was already managing Arrowhead Pond said of the sale, "Since we manage the Pond ... it seemed natural to purchase the team since Disney had it up for sale for quite a while." Brian Burke, former Vancouver Canucks general manager and president, was appointed general manager and executive vice-president of the Mighty Ducks on June 20, 2005. Shortly after, Babcock rejected an extension to stay with the Ducks, signing with Detroit instead. Thanks to a weighted draft lottery in which the Ducks had a 4.16% chance at first overall, they were able to get the second pick, which they used to select Bobby Ryan.

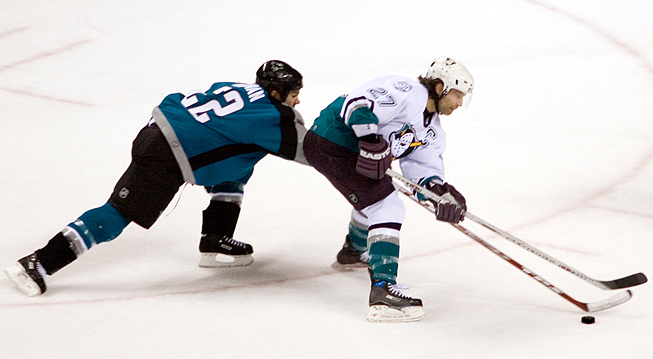
Scott Niedermayer battles for the puck with San Jose Sharks' Scott Hannan in a game during the 2005–06 season; signed in the 2005 off-season, he was later named as team captain

On August 1, 2005, former Norris Trophy-winning defenseman Randy Carlyle was hired as the seventh head coach in team history. Burke was familiar with Carlyle's coaching ability, as the latter had coached the Manitoba Moose from 1996 to 2001 (International Hockey League) and 2004–05 (American Hockey League); the Moose had been the Canucks' farm club since 2001. On August 4, 2005, free agent defenseman Scott Niedermayer signed with the Mighty Ducks to play with his brother Rob; Scott Niedermayer was almost immediately named team captain. On August 22, Selänne returned to Anaheim after undergoing knee surgery. He led the team in scoring during the season with 40 goals and 50 assists for 90 points. He would also record his 1,000th NHL point on January 30, 2006. The 2005–06 season also saw the emergence of rookies Ryan Getzlaf, and Corey Perry. On November 15, 2005, Anaheim traded Sergei Fedorov and a fifth-round draft pick to the Columbus Blue Jackets in exchange for defenseman François Beauchemin and forward Tyler Wright.

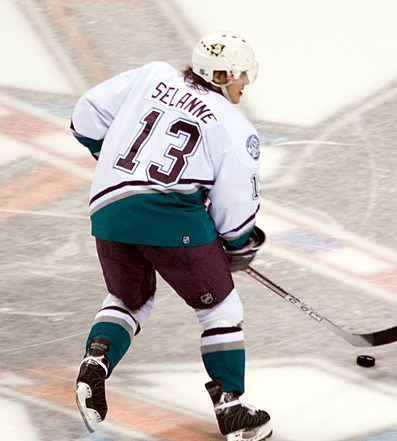
Teemu Selänne playing for the Mighty Ducks of Anaheim against San Jose Sharks in 2006

The Ducks finished the season with a 43–27–12 record, good enough for 98 points. The Ducks faced the Calgary Flames in the conference quarterfinals and forced a seventh game in Calgary, shutting out the Flames to reach the conference semifinals. In the conference semifinals, the Ducks swept the Avalanche in four-straight games;, during which Ilya Bryzgalov broke Giguère's scoreless streak record from the 2003 Stanley Cup playoffs. In the franchise's second conference finals appearance, they faced the eighth-seeded Edmonton Oilers, a series the Ducks would ultimately lose in five games.

In January 2006, Samueli announced the team would be renamed as simply the "Anaheim Ducks" starting the following season.

==== Stanley Cup champions (2006–2007) ====
Prior to the 2006–07 season, the Ducks adopted a completely new look to go along with their new name; their team colors became black, gold and orange, and the logo of a duck-shaped goaltender mask was dropped in favor of the word "Ducks", with a webbed foot in place of the "D".

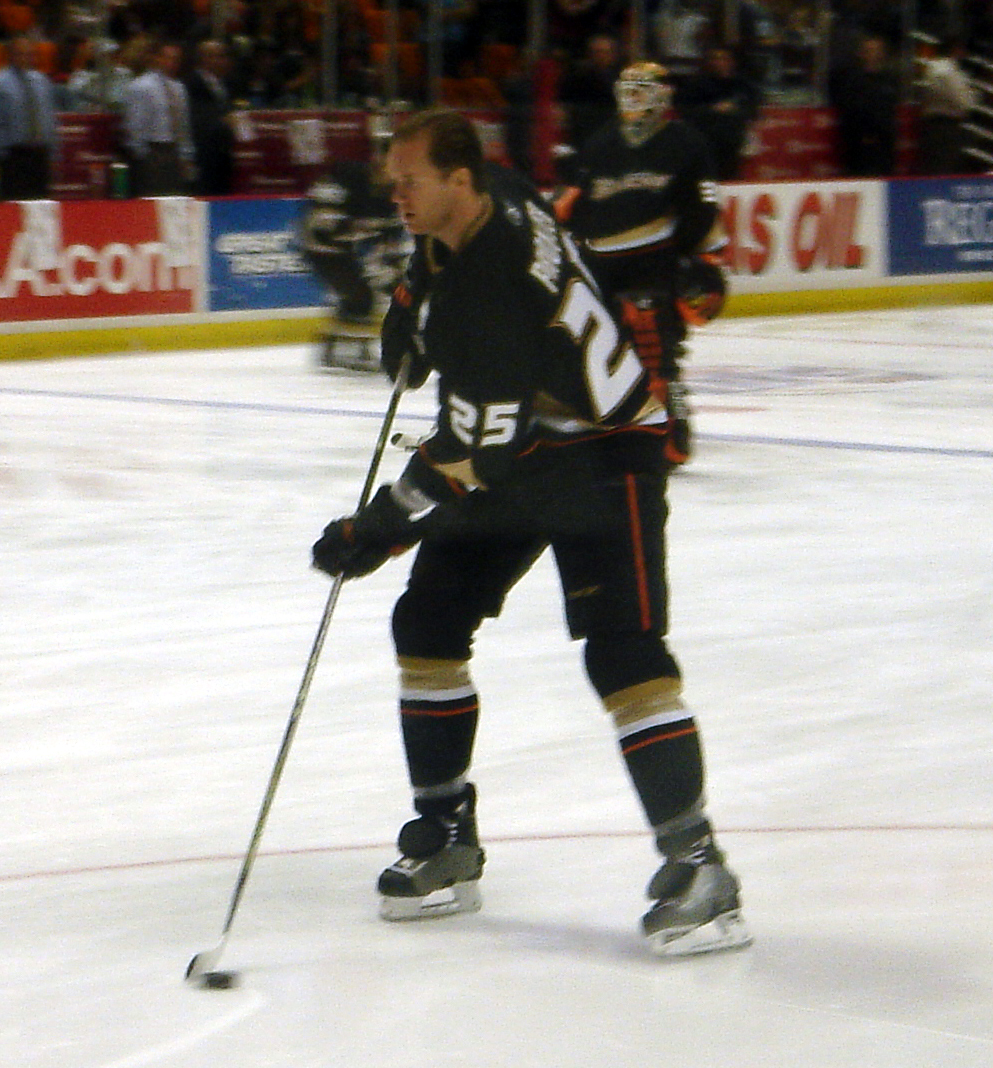
Chris Pronger during the 2006–07 season. The Ducks acquired Pronger during the 2006 off-season, in a trade with the Edmonton Oilers

The Ducks traded Joffrey Lupul, Ladislav Šmíd and a first-round draft pick to the Edmonton Oilers in exchange for defenseman Chris Pronger. On November 9, 2006, the Ducks defeated the Vancouver Canucks 6–0 at General Motors Place in Vancouver to improve their season record to 12–0–4. The win set an NHL record by remaining undefeated in regulation for the first 16 games of the season, eclipsing the previous mark set by the 1983–84 Edmonton Oilers. (Note: The record has since been broken by the Chicago Blackhawks' 21–0–3 start during the 2012–13 season) On April 7, the Ducks won their first division title in franchise history when the Canucks defeated the second-place San Jose Sharks in the final game of the season. The Ducks ended the regular season with a 48–20–14 record and 110 points. Although they had three fewer wins than the Nashville Predators, the Ducks won the second seed in the West by virtue of winning the Pacific Division title; the Predators finished second in the Central Division behind the Detroit Red Wings (the top seed in the West).

In the 2007 playoffs, the Ducks defeated the Minnesota Wild in the conference quarterfinals and the Canucks in the semifinals, both in five games. The Ducks faced the Detroit Red Wings in the franchise's third trip to the conference finals. In game three, Pronger elbowed Tomas Holmström and subsequently received a one-game suspension for the illegal check. However, the Ducks won game four without Pronger and game five in Detroit, with Selänne scoring game fives overtime winner. The Ducks then finished off the Red Wings in game six for their second Stanley Cup Final appearance.

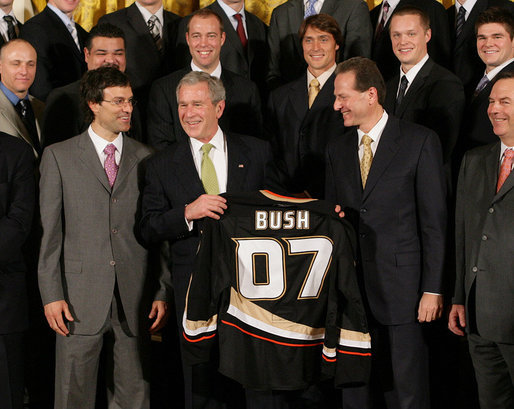
U.S. President George W. Bush is presented with a Ducks jersey during a White House ceremony in honor of the team's championship season

In the Stanley Cup Final, the Ducks won the first two games at home against the Ottawa Senators. However, the Ducks lost game three and Pronger received his second one-game suspension, this time for elbowing Dean McAmmond. The Ducks were again able to win without Pronger, defeating the Senators in game four for an opportunity to win the Stanley Cup on home ice in game five. On June 6, the Ducks defeated the Senators 6–2 at Honda Center to claim their first Stanley Cup in franchise history. Moen was credited with the Cup game-winning goal after Senators defenseman Chris Phillips put the puck in off of goaltender Ray Emery into their own net. Scott Niedermayer was awarded the second Conn Smythe Trophy in Ducks history. The Ducks became the first California team and the first NHL West Coast team to win the Stanley Cup.

==== Post-Stanley Cup (2007–2008) ====
The Ducks began their title defense in the 2007–08 season without Scott Niedermayer and Teemu Selänne, who were both contemplating retirement. To offset those losses, Burke signed forward Todd Bertuzzi and defenseman Mathieu Schneider. Chris Pronger was also named captain with Niedermayer's absence. The team began the season in London for the 2007 NHL Premiere and split their two games with the Los Angeles Kings. The team began slow out of the gate, going 4–7–2 to begin the season. During the season, Burke put goaltender Ilya Bryzgalov on waivers, where he was picked up by the Phoenix Coyotes. Free agent signee Jonas Hiller then became the back-up to starter Jean-Sébastien Giguère. Both Selänne and Niedermayer would return mid-season and the team finished with a 47–27–8 record, good enough to earn home-ice advantage in the first round of the playoffs finishing as the fourth seed in the Western Conference. They were eliminated in the quarterfinals in six games by the Dallas Stars. In the off-season, Burke bought out the remaining year on Bertuzzi's contract and traded Schneider to the Atlanta Thrashers.

=== Bob Murray era (2008–2021) ===
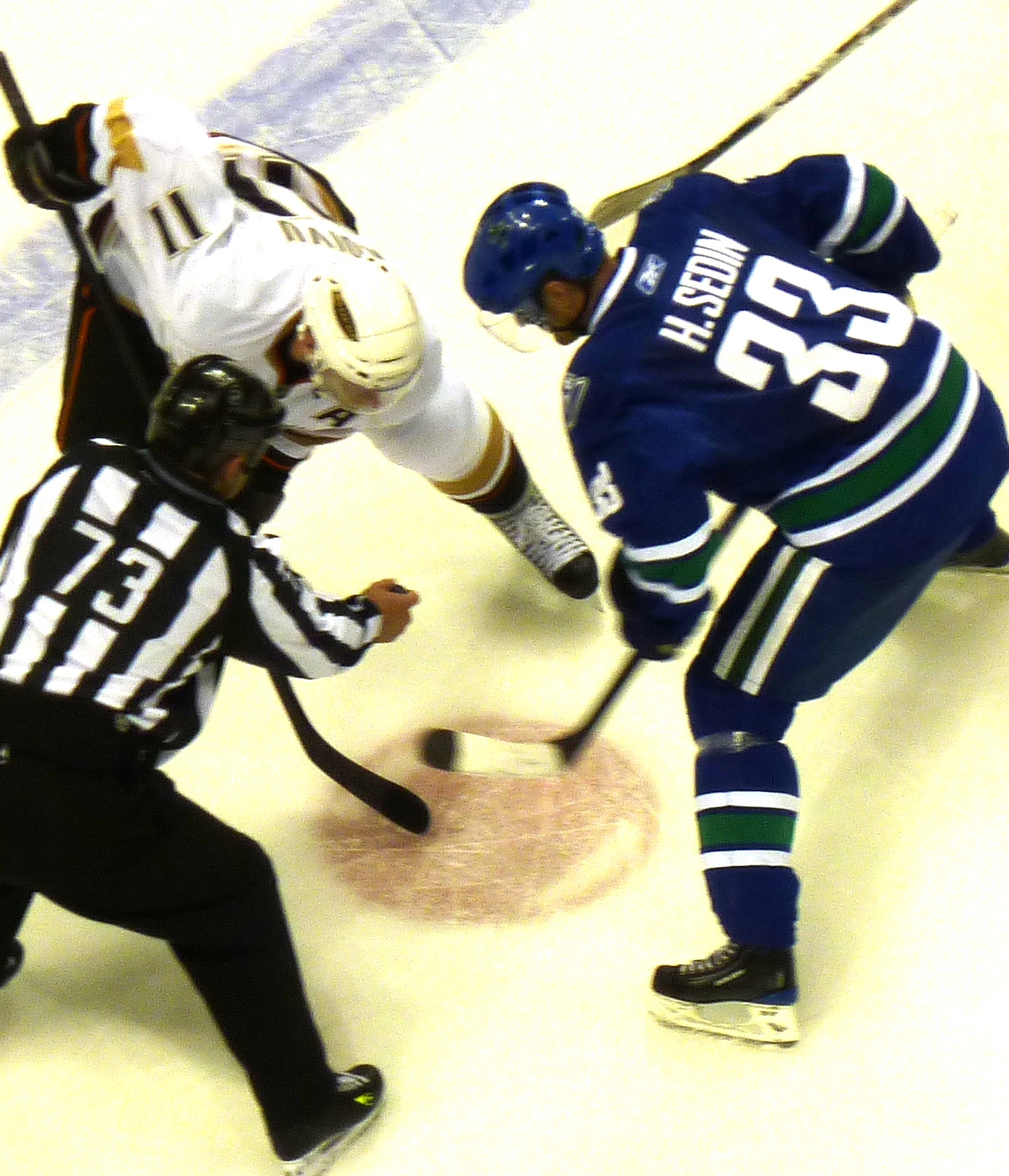
Saku Koivu of the Ducks, and Henrik Sedin of the Vancouver Canucks, face-off during a game in the 2009–10 season. The Ducks signed Koivu during the 2009 off-season.

The Ducks began the 2008–09 season with another slow start, going 1–5–0. On November 12, 2008, Burke resigned to take the same position for the Toronto Maple Leafs. Bob Murray replaced him as general manager, but the team struggled to make the playoffs as the eighth seed in the Western Conference. A bevy of trade deadline deals saw the departure of some mainstays from the Cup team, including Chris Kunitz, who was traded to the Pittsburgh Penguins for defenseman Ryan Whitney, Samuel Pahlsson, who was traded to the Chicago Blackhawks for defenseman James Wisniewski, and Travis Moen, who was traded to the San Jose Sharks for two prospects. The Ducks defeated the first-seeded, Presidents' Trophy-winning San Jose Sharks in six games in the first round before being eliminated in the conference semifinals by the eventual Western Conference champion Detroit Red Wings in seven games. Before the 2009–10 season, the Ducks traded Chris Pronger to the Philadelphia Flyers for Joffrey Lupul, Luca Sbisa and two first-round draft picks. Francois Beauchemin and Rob Niedermayer also left via free agency for the Toronto Maple Leafs and New Jersey Devils, respectively. The Ducks then signed free agent center and former Montreal Canadiens captain Saku Koivu to a one-year deal.

The Ducks would have another slow start, beginning 6–10–3 to the 2009–10 season. Before the trade deadline, the Ducks traded Giguère to the Toronto Maple Leafs for Jason Blake and Vesa Toskala after signing Hiller to a contract extension. The trade deadline saw the Ducks trade Ryan Whitney to Edmonton for offensive defenseman Ľubomír Višňovský, as well as the acquisitions of defenseman Aaron Ward from the Carolina Hurricanes and goaltender Curtis McElhinney from the Calgary Flames. The Ducks played through frequent injuries and picked up play in the second half of the season, but struggled coming out of the Olympic break. For the first time since the lockout, the Ducks failed to make the playoffs with a 39–32–11 record. The 2010 off-season was also busy for the Ducks, as Scott Niedermayer announced his retirement in a June press conference. Niedermayer decided to stay a member of the Ducks as a team consultant. The Ducks re-signed Saku Koivu and signed free agent defenseman Toni Lydman. In addition to Lydman, the Ducks were able to get defenseman Cam Fowler via the draft, and 35-year-old defenseman Andy Sutton signed to a two-year deal. Restricted free agent Bobby Ryan was signed to a five-year deal.

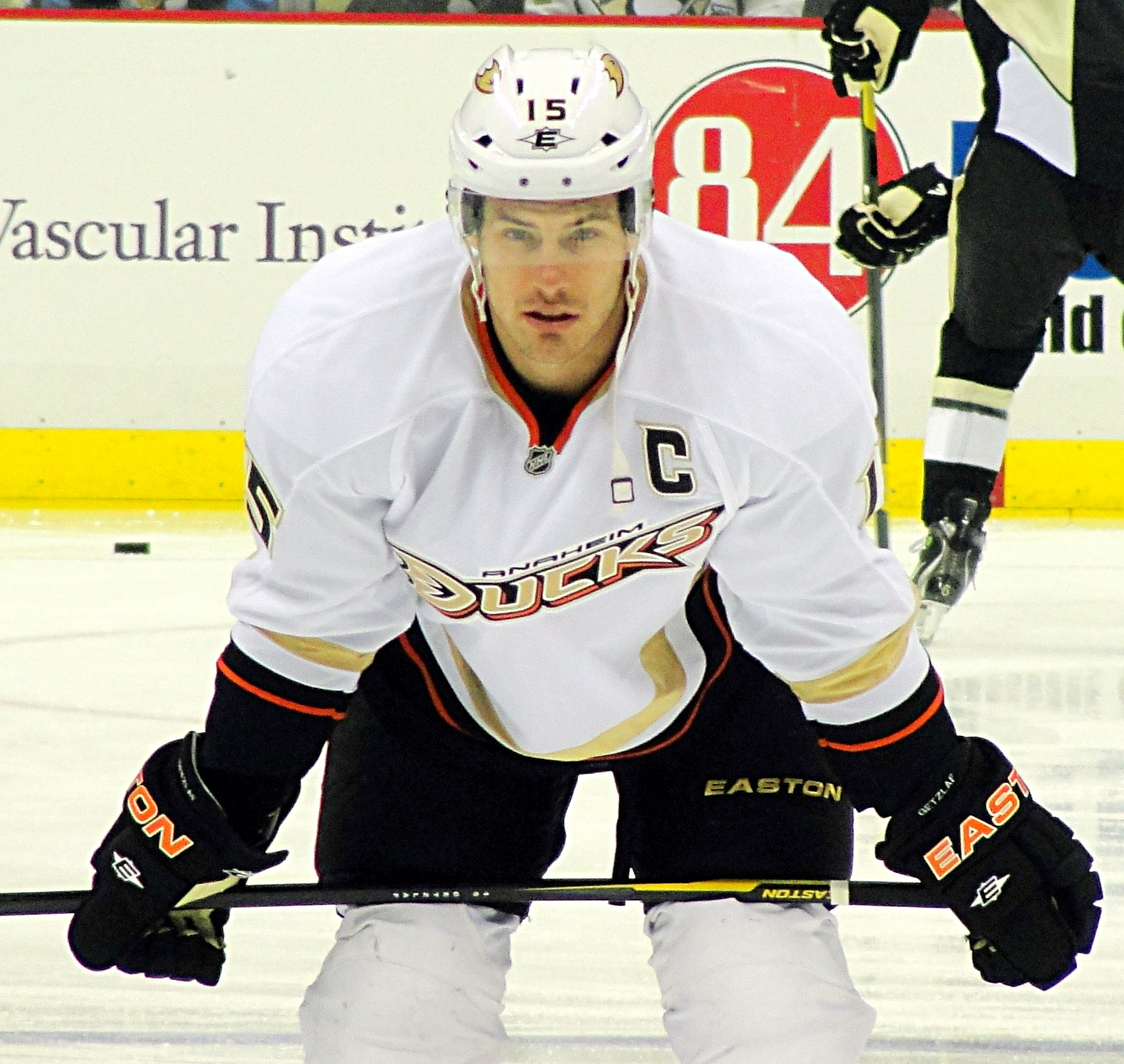
Ryan Getzlaf was drafted by the Ducks in 2003, and served as team captain from 2010 to 2022.

On October 4, 2010, Ryan Getzlaf was named team captain. The 2010–11 season did not begin well for the Ducks, who would lose their first three games and go 4–7–1 throughout October. They maintained a .500 throughout record through the first half of the season, but got better and finished 47–30–5, good for 99 points and second place in the Pacific Division. Corey Perry and Jonas Hiller represented the Ducks at the 2011 All-Star Game, and Perry went on to have a 50-goal, 98-point season, which won him the Maurice "Rocket" Richard Trophy and Hart Memorial Trophy. He became the first-ever Duck to win the Hart, as well as the first Richard winner as a Duck since Teemu Selänne won the award in 1999. However, Hiller was injured at the All-Star Game and missed the rest of the season. In the 2011 playoffs, they lost in the first round to the fifth-seeded Nashville Predators.

==== Bruce Boudreau as head coach ====
Before the 2011–12 season began, former Mighty Duck Ruslan Salei died in a plane crash with several other former NHL players of Kontinental Hockey League (KHL) club Lokomotiv Yaroslavl. The team wore a black patch with his former jersey number, 24, in current team numbering. The Ducks started the season with 2011 NHL Premiere games in Helsinki and Stockholm. This was the second time in franchise history that they started the regular season with games in Europe. They lost 4–1 to the Buffalo Sabres in Helsinki but defeated the New York Rangers 2–1 after a shootout in Stockholm. After a slow start to the season, the Ducks replaced head coach Randy Carlyle with former Washington Capitals head coach Bruce Boudreau. Although the team had a 17–3–4 run in the second half of the season, the Ducks ultimately failed to reach the playoffs in the 2011–12 season.

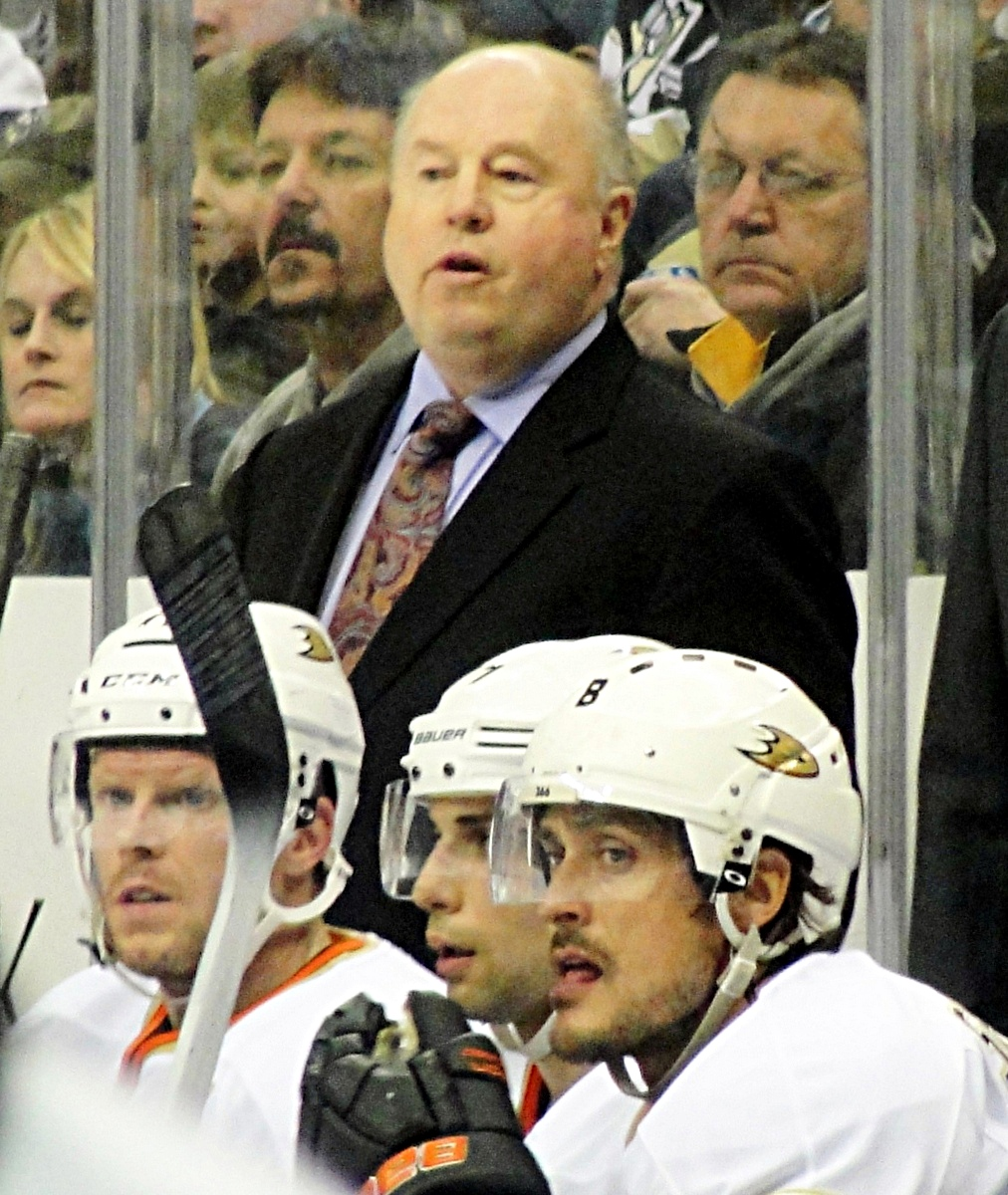
Bruce Boudreau was the head coach of the Ducks from 2011 to 2016. He coached the team to four consecutive division titles.

The 2012–13 season was shortened to 48 games due to a labor lockout. Due to the shortened season and the compacted game scheduling, all games were to be played against the Ducks' own Western Conference opponents, and no games were played against Eastern Conference teams. The Ducks finished the season with a 30–12–6 record and would win their second Pacific Division title in franchise history. In the conference quarterfinals, they ended up losing to the seventh-seeded Detroit Red Wings in seven games, despite holding a 3–2 series lead after game five.

Entering the 2013–14 season, the 20th anniversary of the franchise, it was announced that Teemu Selänne would be playing in his final NHL season. In the off-season, Bobby Ryan was traded to the Ottawa Senators in exchange for forwards Jakob Silfverberg, Stefan Noesen and Ottawa's first-round pick in the 2014 NHL entry draft, and the Ducks also signed center Mathieu Perreault, and a returning Dustin Penner. Despite a bad season opener suffering a 6–1 rout at the hands of the Colorado Avalanche, the Ducks followed the opener with seven-straight wins, a run which was repeated and surpassed twice more during the season, including a franchise-record setting ten consecutive wins from December 6 to 28, 2013. A 9–1 victory over the Vancouver Canucks on January 15 saw Anaheim establish a 20–0–2 record at Honda Center, which matched the longest season-opening home points streak in 34 years. They would also play in their first outdoor game on January 25 at Dodger Stadium in the 2014 Stadium Series against the Los Angeles Kings, which they won 3–0. The Ducks remained towards the top of the NHL standings for the entire season, ending the regular season with a franchise-best 54–20–8 record (116 points) and eventually finished one point behind the Boston Bruins in the race for the Presidents' Trophy. The Ducks secured a second consecutive Pacific Division title and the number one seed in the Western Conference. goaltender John Gibson also made his NHL debut, shutting out the Canucks 3–0. Anaheim faced the eighth-seeded Dallas Stars in the first round and were victorious in six games, marking the first time since 2009 that the Ducks had won a playoff series. In the Western Conference second round, the Ducks faced their geographic rival and eventual Stanley Cup champions the Los Angeles Kings for the first time ever in the playoffs. However, the Ducks ultimately went down in seven games to their Southern Californian rivals, losing game seven by a score of 6–2 at Honda Center.

On June 27, 2014, the Ducks acquired center Ryan Kesler and a third-round pick in 2015 from the Vancouver Canucks. In the following season, they won their third-straight Pacific Division title and finished as the top seed in the West with 109 points. In the 2015 playoffs, they swept the Winnipeg Jets in the first round and beat the Calgary Flames in five games to set up a conference final against the Chicago Blackhawks. After taking a three games to two series lead, the Ducks lost the final two games of the series, including game seven on home ice. This marked the third-straight season the Ducks had lost a series in game seven at home after leading the series three games to two.

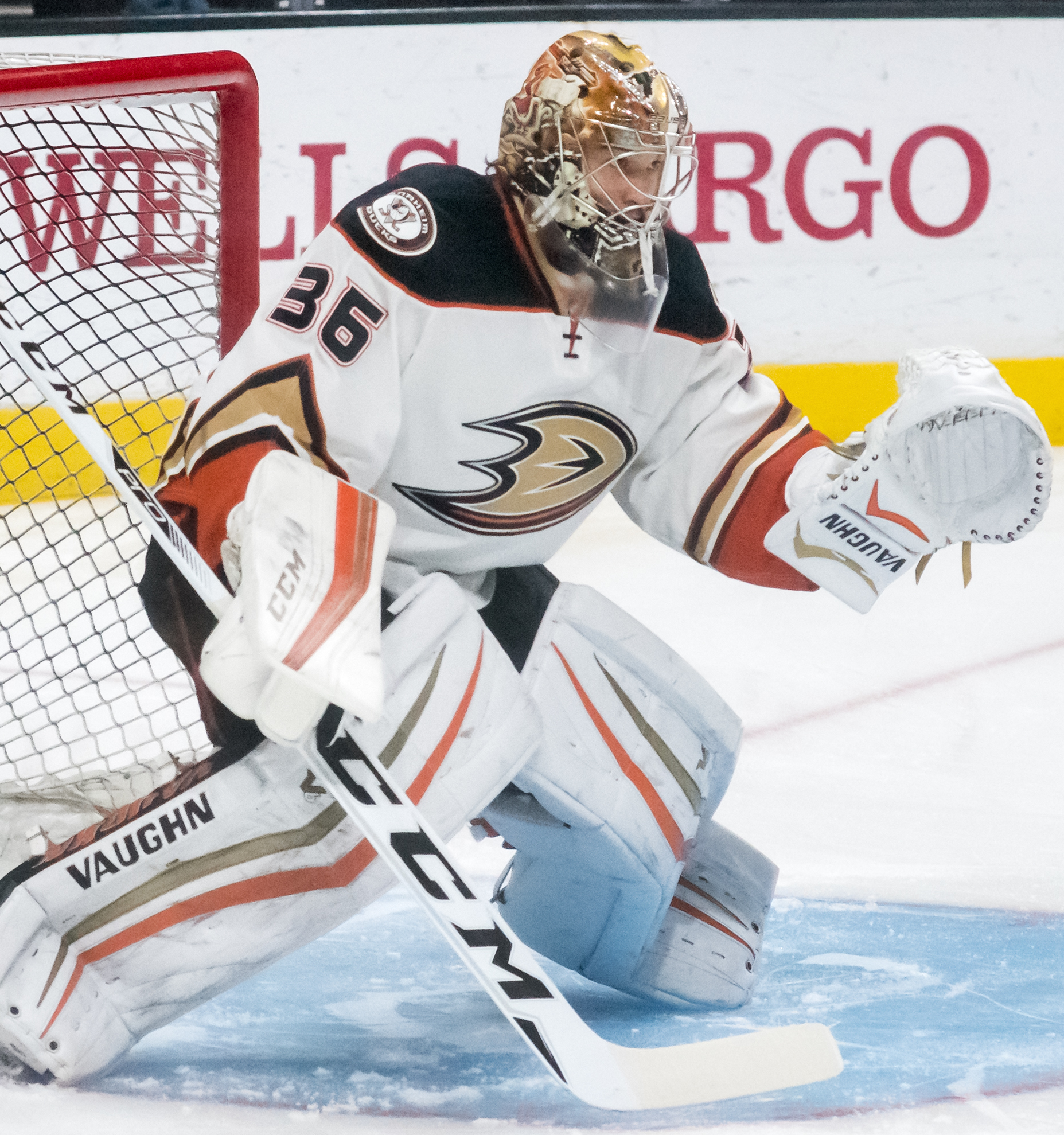
John Gibson in net for the Ducks, April 2016

On July 15, 2015, the Ducks signed Ryan Kesler to a six-year contract extension totaling a reported $41.25 million. Just prior to the 2015 NHL entry draft, the Ducks sent Emerson Etem and a draft pick to the New York Rangers in exchange for left-wing Carl Hagelin. They also traded for Vancouver Canucks defenseman Kevin Bieksa and added veterans Shawn Horcoff, Chris Stewart, and Mike Santorelli. Entering the 2015–16 NHL season, many analysts pegged the Ducks as Stanley Cup favorites. However, scoring struggles led to a slow start, with the team still out of a playoff spot in December. The team improved afterwards riding the goaltending of John Gibson. On March 6, 2016, the Ducks set a franchise record with an 11-game winning streak which ended the following night. On March 24, 2016, the Ducks clinched a playoff spot in a 6–5 overtime loss to the Maple Leafs. the Ducks would win their third consecutive pacific division title. However, in the first round of the playoffs, they fell in seven games to the Nashville Predators, which led to the firing of head coach Bruce Boudreau. On June 14, 2016, the Ducks announced they re-hired former head coach Randy Carlyle.

==== Carlyle returns ====
Although the Ducks started the 2016–17 season 0–3–1, the team managed to finish first in the Pacific Division for the fourth consecutive season. In the first round, they swept the Calgary Flames. On May 10, 2017, the Ducks ended their game seven losing streak when they defeated the Edmonton Oilers in the second round, winning the series 4–3 and advancing to the conference finals for the second time in three seasons. They would fall to the Nashville Predators in game six, ending their playoff run. In the off-season, the team acquired goaltender Ryan Miller in free agency and re-signed Cam Fowler.

In the following season, the Ducks traded for Adam Henrique, giving Sami Vatanen to the New Jersey Devils. However, they failed to win the Pacific Division for the first time since the 2011–12 season. They clinched a playoff berth, but were swept by the San Jose Sharks in the first round.

During the 2018–19 season, the Ducks started the season 19–11–5, but then went on a 12-game losing streak and amidst a seven-game losing streak they fired Carlyle. Bob Murray replaced him as interim head coach; however, the Ducks missed the playoffs for the third time since the 2002–03 NHL season. In the 2019 draft, the Ducks selected Trevor Zegras at ninth overall.

=== Rebuild (2021–2025) ===
On June 17, 2019, the team named Dallas Eakins as the franchise's tenth head coach. Corey Perry left the team in free agency, signing with the Dallas Stars. However, the team was unable to make the expanded 2020 playoffs due to multiple losing streaks throughout the season, missing the postseason for the second consecutive season.

The following season, the team did not fare better as they set an NHL record for the worst power play percentage in a season at 8.94%, missing the playoffs for the third consecutive season. Ryan Miller retired at the end of the season. In the 2021 draft, the Ducks selected third overall Mason McTavish.

On November 9, 2021, Murray was placed on administrative leave by the Ducks pending the results of an ongoing investigation. The investigation was reportedly focused on Murray's alleged history of verbal abuse to players and staff members. Assistant general manager Jeff Solomon was initially named as acting general manager but was then named interim general manager when Murray resigned on November 10. Pat Verbeek was named general manager on February 3, 2022. At the end of the season, captain Ryan Getzlaf retired.

The Ducks fell to last place in the 2022–23 season, including a league worst 357 goals against and -129 goal differential. Following the end of the regular season, Eakins left as head coach. Though the Ducks finished last in the league during the 2022–23 season, the Chicago Blackhawks won the draft lottery and Anaheim's pick fell to second overall. The team hired Greg Cronin as the Ducks' eleventh head coach on June 5, 2023. At the 2023 NHL entry draft, the team selected Leo Carlsson second overall. The Ducks also signed Radko Gudas. The team missed the playoffs again, only gaining one point over the previous season. After the conclusion of the regular season Jakob Silfverberg signed a contract to play overseas in Sweden. Prior to the 2024–25 season, Radko Gudas was named team captain. With their failure to make the playoffs for the seventh consecutive season, Cronin was fired. Joel Quenneville, who had been reinstated to the NHL following an independent investigation into their role in the 2010 Chicago Blackhawks sexual assault scandal, was hired as the team's next head coach. In addition, both Trevor Zegras and John Gibson were traded respectively to the Philadelphia Flyers and the Detroit Red Wings in exchange for forward Ryan Poehling and goaltender Petr Mrázek.

== Team information ==
=== Name ===
Founded in 1993, the then-called Mighty Ducks of Anaheim were directly named for The Mighty Ducks movies. When the Walt Disney Company, which produced the movies and owned the NHL team, sold the team in 2005, the name was shortened to Anaheim Ducks.

=== Uniforms ===
==== 1993–2006 ====
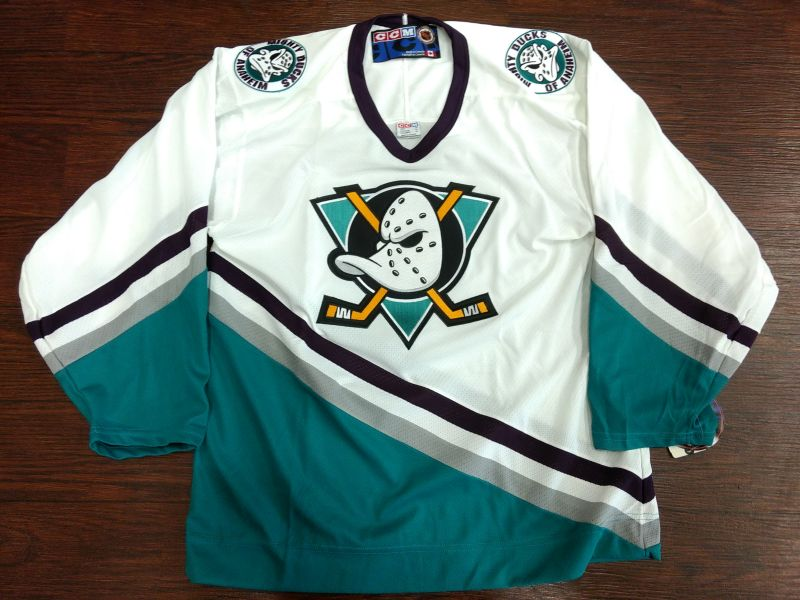
The original Mighty Ducks of Anaheim white jersey from 1993 to 2006.

The Mighty Ducks' original road (later home) jersey features an eggplant and jade base, divided by silver, purple and white diagonal stripes. The home (later road) jersey has a white and jade base, divided by purple, white and silver diagonal stripes. For most of its history, purple pants were used with this set; from 1993 to 1997, and from 1999 to 2003, the pants featured jade and white stripes. In 1996, an alternate front-facing "angry duck mask" logo is added on the shoulders.

In 1995, as part of the NHL's third jersey program, the Mighty Ducks wore alternate "Wild Wing" jerseys, featuring the current mascot breaking out of a sheet of ice amid a jade base and purple trim. The primary logo appears on both shoulders. Even though the Mighty Ducks won two of three games with this uniform, it was immediately retired.

From 1997 to 1999, the Mighty Ducks wore two alternate jerseys. The road alternate has a jade base with purple, jade and silver stripes along the chest and sleeves, and the home alternate has a white base with jade, purple and silver stripes along the chest and sleeves. During this period, the Mighty Ducks switched to black pants and helmets, but in 1999, returned to wearing purple pants and helmets while retiring the road alternate jerseys.

In 2003, the Mighty Ducks released a black alternate jersey with purple and silver trim. This design features the full team name written in a classic script style, and the interlocking "MD" on both shoulders.

==== 2006–2014 ====
The duck foot logo has been in use as either a primary or secondary logo since 2006.

After rebranding as the Anaheim Ducks, the uniforms became black and white with metallic gold and orange stripes. The crest featured the full team name in front. This set was worn until the 2013–14 season, with a few adjustments after Reebok moved to the Edge template in 2007.

In 2010, the Ducks unveiled a black alternate jersey, featuring the "webbed D" as the main crest and thick orange stripes. The original Mighty Ducks logo, this time recolored to the current scheme and placed inside a white oval with the full team name, was placed on the shoulders.

For their Stadium Series game on January 25, 2014, the Ducks created a special jersey. This jersey is primarily orange with black lettering and numbers. The chromed Ducks logo, designed for the Stadium Series, is on the chest. There are gold, black and white stripes on the sleeves as well as black trim around the bottom and sleeves. The jersey has old-fashion black lace on the neck and also has a unique "OC" logo on the left shoulder to represent Orange County where the Ducks are from.

==== 2014–2024 ====
In 2014, the "webbed D" alternate became the primary jersey, and a corresponding white jersey was also unveiled. The letters, previously with a gold accent, now featured orange accents. This set was later tweaked in 2017 after Adidas became the NHL's uniform provider.

In 2015, an orange third jersey was unveiled, with the modified Mighty Ducks crest in front. The "webbed D" was moved to the shoulders. This set was used until 2017, and was brought back in a modern Adidas template starting in 2019.

The Ducks announced for their 25th anniversary season of 2018–19 the adoption of a new third jersey, featuring the original Mighty Ducks logo, striping pattern, and purple and jade colors. While it had the elements of the original jersey, it kept the modern-day aspects of the Ducks identity such as the "webbed D" on the shoulders, black base and current lettering.

For the 2020–21 season, Adidas released a special alternate uniform called the "Reverse Retro" series, which were alternate color versions of throwback uniform designs. The Ducks' version was a white rendition of their 1995–96 Wild Wing alternates. A second "Reverse Retro" uniform was unveiled in the 2022–23 season, this time with the 1993–2006 white uniform recolored to the current orange, black and gold colors.

The Ducks unveiled a 30th-anniversary alternate uniform for the 2023–24 season. The design brought back the purple and jade look the team originally sported from 1993 to 2006, and debuted a new version of the "Wild Wing" mask logo inside a jade circle with the "Anaheim Ducks" name and current logo.

==== 2024–present ====
The current wordmark for the Anaheim Ducks.

On June 24, the Ducks fully unveiled their new logo and their new Fanatics-produced jerseys. The home jersey is fully orange with black, gold, and white striping on the bottom and sleeves of the jersey, while the away jersey is white with orange shoulders and the same colored stripes as the home jersey. Both jerseys feature a revised version of the Duck foot logo of 2006–2024 on the shoulders.

==== Colors and logos ====
The team's colors were eggplant and jade until the change of ownership in 2006. At this point, they became orange, black and gold, with white in place of black for the away jersey. The only exception is the alternate jersey, which is mostly orange. Orange, which has become one of the team's primary colors, is in reference to Orange County, where Anaheim is located.

The original Mighty Ducks logo featured an old-style Jacques Plante-inspired goaltender mask, shaped to form the appearance of a duck bill. Behind the mask are two intersecting hockey sticks, a black hockey puck, and a triangle; the color of the triangle alternated between green and gray.

Upon renaming, the Ducks' logo changed into a webbed foot forming a "D". The text itself is gold (which sometimes may appear as bronze as well) with orange and black accents (forming a three-dimensional appearance). The entire logo is in turn outlined by silver. This is shortened from a prior wordmark logo that spelled out the word "Ducks" in all capital letters.

The current logo of the Ducks is similar to that used in 1993–2006. The refreshed current version has orange hockey sticks which are flat and more curved than that of the original. The triangle is gold, along with the shading under the mask. Other new additions include an orange eye and gold shading above the mask's eye hole. The sticks of the logo still retains the "W" tape, and when shown together shows WW as a nod to the mascot Wild Wing. A revised duck foot, dropping the orange stripe, grey and white outlines is featured as a secondary logo on the shoulders.

=== Mascot ===
The official mascot for the team is an anthropomorphized duck by the name of Wild Wing. He has been the team's mascot since its inaugural season. He wears a Ducks jersey with the number 93 on the back, referring to the year the Ducks became an NHL team.

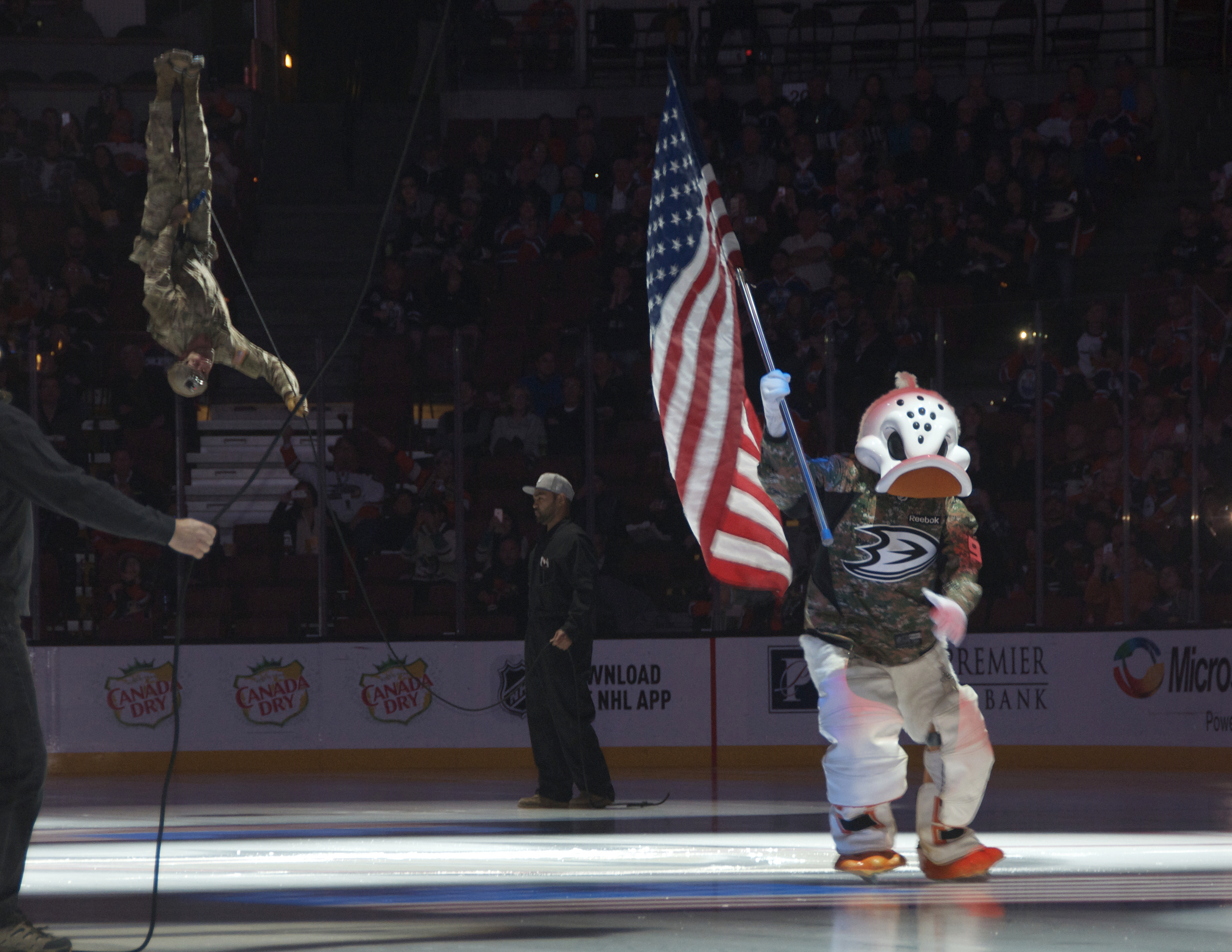
Wild Wing with members of the California National Guard prior to the ceremonial first puck

He regularly descends from the rafters of the arena when making his in-game entrances. In one such descent the rigging that lowered Wild Wing from the rafters malfunctioned leaving the mascot trapped fifty feet above the ice for several minutes. Another well known blunder occurred in October 1995 when Wild Wing, attempting to jump through a "wall of fire", accidentally tripped causing the mascot to land on the fire and set his costume ablaze.

His physical appearance is similar to the duck mask in the original Mighty Ducks logo. A bronze statue of Wild Wing was located outside the south doors of Honda Center from 1993 to 2012, until construction began on the 'Grand Terrace' addition to the arena. When construction was completed and the Grand Terrace opened, the statue was noticeably absent. The statue was later returned from storage in 2017 and sat at the southeast entrance of the arena.. The statue was temporarily removed again in 2026 when construction began on the arena's new south entrance. It currently sits outside the Anaheim Regional Transportation Intermodal Center.

The mascot was the inspiration for the character Wildwing Flashblade in Disney's Mighty Ducks cartoon series.

The Mighty Ducks also used a secondary "mascot", a person (with no particular costume) called the Iceman, during the team's first game in 1993. The Iceman appeared occasionally in the stands, played an electric guitar, and attempted to liven up the crowd. However, the Iceman was poorly received by fans and was quickly eliminated after the Ducks lost to the Red Wings in their inaugural game, 7–2.

== Season-by-season record ==
This is a partial list of the last five seasons completed by the Ducks. For the full season-by-season history, see List of Anaheim Ducks seasons.

Note: GP = Games played, W = Wins, L = Losses, T = Ties, OTL = Overtime Losses, Pts = Points, GF = Goals for, GA = Goals against

Season	GP	W	L	OTL	Pts	GF	GA	Finish	Playoffs
2021–22	82	31	37	14	76	232	271	7th, Pacific	Did not qualify
2022–23	82	23	47	12	58	209	338	8th, Pacific	Did not qualify
2023–24	82	27	50	5	59	204	295	7th, Pacific	Did not qualify
2024–25	82	35	37	10	80	221	263	6th, Pacific	Did not qualify
2025–26	82	43	33	6	92	273	288	3rd, Pacific	Lost in second round, 2–4 (Golden Knights)

== Players and personnel ==
=== Current roster ===
Updated November 17, 2026

No.	Nat	Player	Pos	S/G	Age	Acquired	Birthplace
91	(Sweden)	Leo Carlsson (A)	C	L	21	2023	Karlstad, Sweden
28	(United States)	Judd Caulfield	RW	R	25	2023	Grand Forks, North Dakota
12	(United States)	Sam Colangelo	RW	R	24	2020	Stoneham, Massachusetts
1	(Czech Republic)	Lukáš Dostál	G	L	26	2018	Brno, Czech Republic
61	(United States)	Cutter Gauthier	LW	L	22	2024	Skellefteå, Sweden
64	(Finland)	Mikael Granlund (C)	C	L	34	2025	Oulu, Finland
18	(Canada)	A. J. Greer	LW	L	29	2026	Notre-Dame-des-Prairies, Quebec
14	(United States)	Drew Helleson	D	R	25	2022	Farmington, Minnesota
55	(Canada)	Tyson Hinds	D	L	23	2021	Gatineau, Quebec
33	(Finland)	Ville Husso	G	L	31	2025	Helsinki, Finland
17	(Canada)	Alex Killorn (A)	LW	L	37	2023	Halifax, Nova Scotia
2	(United States)	Jackson LaCombe (A)	D	L	25	2019	Eden Prairie, Minnesota
67	(Canada)	Tristan Luneau	D	R	22	2022	Victoriaville, Quebec
39	(Canada)	Jeff Malott	LW	L	30	2026	Burlington, Ontario
95	(Canada)	Roger McQueen	C	R	20	2025	Saskatoon, Saskatchewan
98	(Russia)	Pavel Mintyukov	D	L	22	2022	Moscow, Russia
34	(United States)	Travis Mitchell	D	L	27	2026	South Lyon, Michigan
3	(United States)	Ian Moore	D	R	24	2020	Concord, Massachusetts
13	(United States)	Nikita Nesterenko	C	L	25	2023	Brooklyn, New York
25	(United States)	Ryan Poehling	C	L	27	2025	Lakeville, Minnesota
45	(Canada)	Beckett Sennecke	RW	R	20	2024	Toronto, Ontario
19	(United States)	Troy Terry (A)	RW	R	29	2015	Denver, Colorado
77	(United States)	Frank Vatrano	RW	L	32	2022	East Longmeadow, Massachusetts
47	(Canada)	Noah Warren	D	R	22	2022	Montreal, Quebec
42	(United States)	Tim Washe	C	L	25	2025	Clarkston, Michigan

=== Team captains ===
- Troy Loney, 1993–1994
- Randy Ladouceur, 1994–1996
- Paul Kariya, 1996–2003
- Teemu Selänne, 1998 (interim)
- Steve Rucchin, 2003–2004
- Scott Niedermayer, 2005–2007, 2008–2010
- Chris Pronger, 2007–2008
- Ryan Getzlaf, 2010–2022
- Radko Gudas, 2024–2026
- Mikael Granlund, 2026–present

=== Coaches ===
- Ron Wilson, 1993–1997
- Pierre Page, 1997–1998
- Craig Hartsburg, 1998–2000
- Guy Charron, 2000–2001
- Bryan Murray, 2001–2002
- Mike Babcock, 2002–2004
- Randy Carlyle, 2005–2011, 2016–2019
- Bruce Boudreau, 2011–2016
- Randy Carlyle, 2016–2019
- Bob Murray, 2019 (interim)
- Dallas Eakins, 2019–2023
- Greg Cronin, 2023–2025
- Joel Quenneville, 2025–present

=== General managers ===
- Jack Ferreira, 1993–1998
- Pierre Gauthier, 1998–2002
- Bryan Murray, 2002–2004
- Al Coates, 2004–2005 (interim)
- Brian Burke, 2005–2008
- Bob Murray, 2008–2021
- Jeff Solomon, 2021–2022 (interim)
- Pat Verbeek, 2022–present

=== First-round draft picks ===
- 1993: Paul Kariya (4th overall)
- 1994: Oleg Tverdovsky (2nd overall)
- 1995: Chad Kilger (4th overall)
- 1996: Ruslan Salei (9th overall)
- 1997: Michael Holmqvist (18th overall)
- 1998: Vitaly Vishnevskiy (5th overall)
- 2000: Alexei Smirnov (12th overall)
- 2001: Stanislav Chistov (5th overall)
- 2002: Joffrey Lupul (7th overall)
- 2003: Ryan Getzlaf (19th overall), Corey Perry (28th overall)
- 2004: Ladislav Šmíd (9th overall)
- 2005: Bobby Ryan (2nd overall)
- 2006: Mark Mitera (19th overall)
- 2007: Logan MacMillan (19th overall)
- 2008: Jake Gardiner (17th overall)
- 2009: Peter Holland (15th overall), Kyle Palmieri (26th overall)
- 2010: Cam Fowler (12th overall), Emerson Etem (29th overall)
- 2011: Rickard Rakell (30th overall)
- 2012: Hampus Lindholm (6th overall)
- 2013: Shea Theodore (26th overall)
- 2014: Nick Ritchie (10th overall)
- 2015: Jacob Larsson (27th overall)
- 2016: Max Jones (24th overall), Sam Steel (30th overall)
- 2018: Isac Lundeström (23rd overall)
- 2019: Trevor Zegras (9th overall), Brayden Tracey (29th overall)
- 2020: Jamie Drysdale (6th overall), Jacob Perreault (27th overall)
- 2021: Mason McTavish (3rd overall)
- 2022: Pavel Mintyukov (10th overall), Nathan Gaucher (22nd overall)
- 2023: Leo Carlsson (2nd overall)
- 2024: Beckett Sennecke (3rd overall), Stian Solberg (23rd overall)
- 2025: Roger McQueen (10th overall)
- 2026: Nikita Klepov (15th overall), Marcus Nordmark (28th overall)

== League and team honors ==
=== NHL awards and trophies ===
Stanley Cup

- 2006–07

Clarence S. Campbell Bowl

- 2002–03, 2006–07

Conn Smythe Trophy

- Jean-Sébastien Giguère: 2002–03
- Scott Niedermayer: 2006–07

Hart Memorial Trophy

- Corey Perry: 2010–11

William M. Jennings Trophy

- Frederik Andersen and John Gibson: 2015–16

Lady Byng Memorial Trophy

- Paul Kariya: 1995–96, 1996–97

Bill Masterton Memorial Trophy

- Teemu Selänne: 2005–06

Maurice "Rocket" Richard Trophy

- Teemu Selänne: 1998–99
- Corey Perry: 2010–11

NHL General Manager of the Year Award

- Bob Murray: 2013–14

First All-Star team

- Paul Kariya: 1995–96, 1996–97, 1998–99
- Teemu Selänne: 1996–97
- Scott Niedermayer: 2005–06, 2006–07
- Corey Perry: 2010–11, 2013–14

Second All-Star team

- Teemu Selänne: 1997–98, 1998–99
- Paul Kariya: 1999–2000, 2002–03
- Chris Pronger: 2006–07
- Ľubomír Višňovský: 2010–11
- François Beauchemin: 2012–13
- Ryan Getzlaf: 2013–14

NHL All-Rookie Team

- Paul Kariya: 1994–95
- Bobby Ryan: 2008–09
- Hampus Lindholm: 2013–14
- Frederik Andersen: 2013–14
- John Gibson: 2015–16
- Trevor Zegras: 2021–22
- Cutter Gauthier: 2024–25
- Beckett Sennecke: 2025–26

=== Retired numbers ===
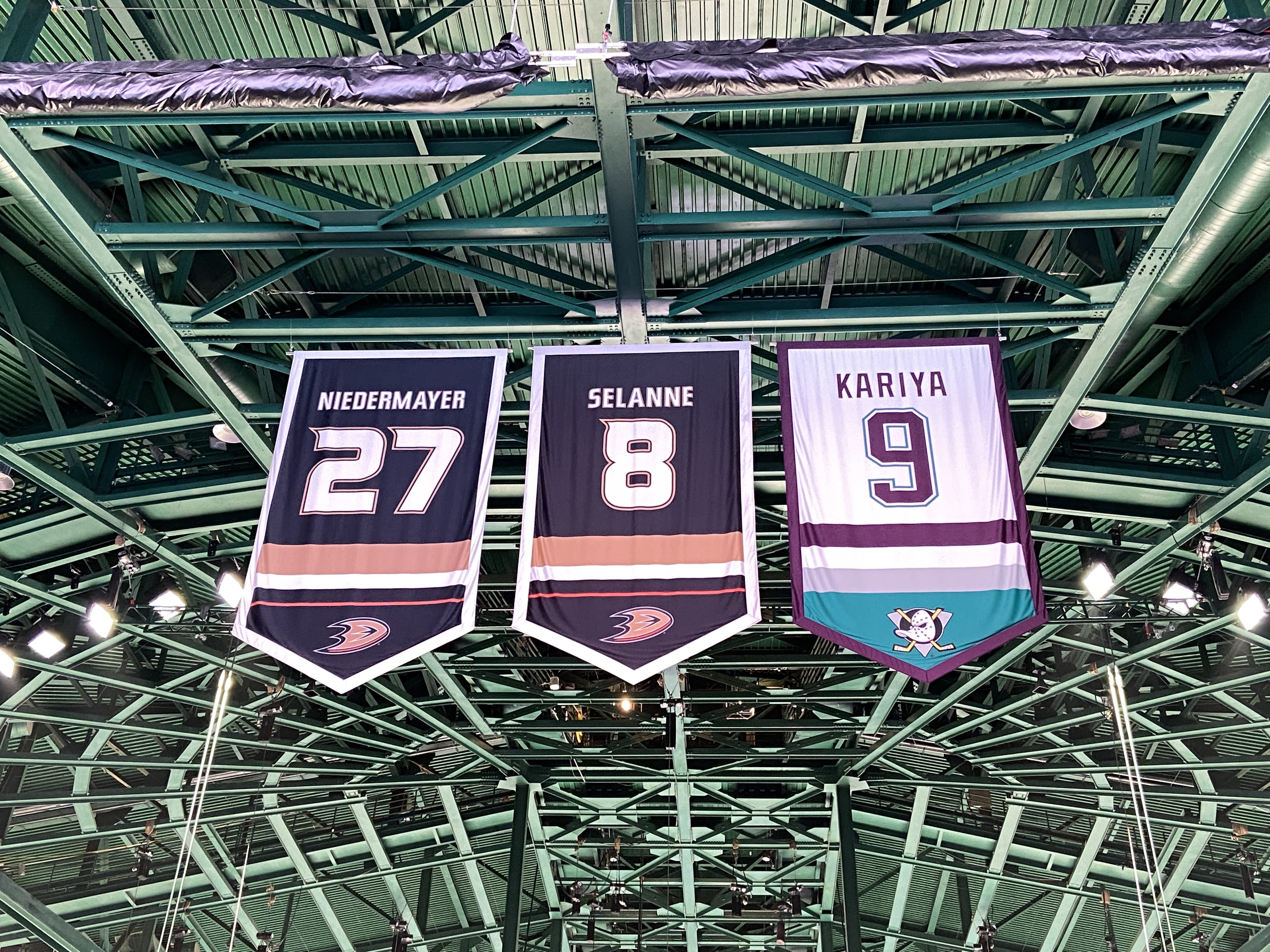
Anaheim Ducks retired numbers hanging inside Honda Center in 2021

The Anaheim Ducks currently have three retired numbers: Teemu Selänne's no. 8, which was retired on January 11, 2015, Paul Kariya's no. 9, retired on October 21, 2018, and Scott Niedermayer's no. 27 on February 17, 2019. On September 1, 2026, the franchise announced that Ryan Getzlaf will have his number 15 retired on January 30, 2027.

The NHL retired Wayne Gretzky's No. 99 for all its member teams at the 2000 NHL All-Star Game.

Anaheim Ducks retired numbers
No.	Player	Position	Tenure	Date
8	Teemu Selänne	RW	1996–2001; 2005–2014	January 11, 2015
9	Paul Kariya	LW	1994–2003	October 21, 2018
27	Scott Niedermayer	D	2005–2010	February 17, 2019

Notes

- Selänne wore number 8 for 14 of his 15 seasons with the Ducks, he would wear number 13 during the 2005–06 season before returning to number 8 from the 2006–07 season onward.

=== Hall of Fame ===
The Anaheim Ducks hold an affiliation with a number of inductees to the Hockey Hall of Fame, including seven inductees from the players category. Of those seven, Paul Kariya and Teemu Selänne earned their credentials primarily with the Ducks.

Jari Kurri was the first player to be inducted in to the Hockey Hall of Fame in 2001. He spent only one season with the team, scoring 13 goals and providing 22 assists. Adam Oates only played one season with team in 2002–03, registering nine goals and 36 assists. Oates was inducted in 2012. Scott Niedermayer, inducted in 2013, spent five seasons with the team, winning the Stanley Cup with the team in 2007, and serving as team captain until his retirement in 2010 (with the exception of the 2008–09 season). Niedermayer provided 60 goals and 204 assists with the team. Sergei Fedorov and Chris Pronger were inducted in 2015. Pronger played three seasons with the team and won the Stanley Cup in 2007, providing 36 goals and 114 assists. He also served as team captain for the 2008–09 season while Niedermayer sat out for most of the season. In 2017, both Kariya and Selänne were inducted into the Hall of Fame. Kariya was drafted by the Ducks and spent nine seasons with team. He spent seven seasons as captain. Kariya scored 300 goals and provided 369 assists while with the Ducks. Selänne started with the team in 1996 via a trade and returned to the team in 2005 winning a Stanley Cup with the team in 2007. Selänne registered 457 goals and 531 assists along with 34 goals and 35 assists in the playoffs. Selänne also holds the NHL record among Finnish players with points and goals.

=== Franchise scoring leaders ===
These are the top-ten point-scorers in franchise history. Figures are updated after each completed NHL regular season.

- * – current Ducks player

Note: Pos = Position; GP = Games played; G = Goals; A = Assists; Pts = Points; P/G = Points per game

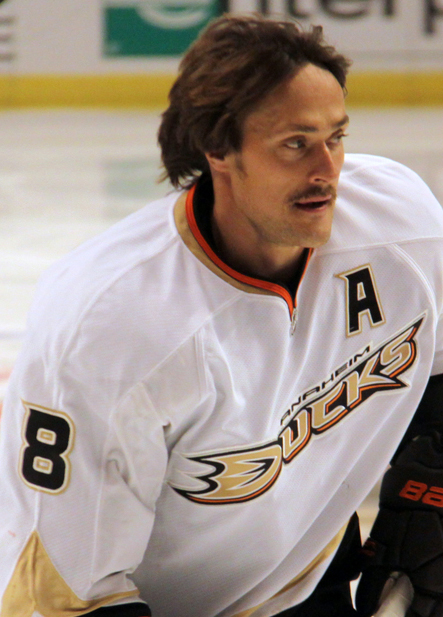
Teemu Selänne is the franchise's all-time leading goalscorer with 457 goals. Selänne is also second in franchise all-time points and assists.

Points
Player	Pos	GP	G	A	Pts	P/G
Ryan Getzlaf	C	1,157	282	737	1,019	.88
Teemu Selänne	RW	966	457	531	988	1.02
Corey Perry	RW	988	372	404	776	.79
Paul Kariya	LW	606	300	369	669	1.10
Cam Fowler	D	991	96	361	457	.46
Steve Rucchin	C	616	153	279	432	.70
Jakob Silfverberg	RW	772	158	196	354	.46
Troy Terry*	RW	488	135	207	342	.70
Rickard Rakell	LW	550	154	185	339	.62
Bobby Ryan	LW	378	147	142	289	.77

Goals
Player	Pos	G
Teemu Selänne	RW	457
Corey Perry	RW	372
Paul Kariya	LW	300
Ryan Getzlaf	C	282
Jakob Silfverberg	LW	158
Rickard Rakell	LW	154
Steve Rucchin	C	153
Bobby Ryan	LW	147
Adam Henrique	C	135
Troy Terry*	RW	135

Assists
Player	Pos	A
Ryan Getzlaf	C	737
Teemu Selänne	RW	531
Corey Perry	RW	404
Paul Kariya	LW	369
Cam Fowler	D	361
Steve Rucchin	C	279
Troy Terry*	RW	207
Scott Niedermayer	D	204
Jakob Silfverberg	RW	196
Rickard Rakell	LW	185

=== Franchise goaltending leaders ===
These are the top-ten goaltenders in franchise history by wins. Figures are updated after each completed NHL regular season.

- * – current Ducks player

Note: GP = Games played; W = Wins; L = Losses; T/O = Ties/Overtime losses; GA = Goal against; GAA = Goals against average; SA = Shots against; SV% = Save percentage; SO = Shutouts

Goaltenders
Player	GP	W	L	T/O	GA	GAA	SA	SV%	SO
Jean-Sébastien Giguère	447	206	163	59	1,057	2.47	12,347	.914	32
John Gibson	506	204	217	63	1,387	2.89	15,420	.910	24
Guy Hebert	441	173	202	52	1,155	2.75	12,968	.911	27
Jonas Hiller	326	162	110	32	768	2.51	9,192	.916	21
Frederik Andersen	125	77	26	12	271	2.33	3,305	.918	6
Lukáš Dostál*	177	72	78	17	533	3.23	5,235	.898	2
Mikhail Shtalenkov	122	34	53	11	320	3.14	3,097	.897	3
Ryan Miller	87	33	27	14	219	2.87	2,434	.910	5
Ilya Bryzgalov	77	27	27	9	173	2.63	1,799	.904	2
Jonathan Bernier	39	21	7	4	83	2.50	982	.915	2

=== Franchise single-season records ===
- Most goals: Teemu Selänne, 52 (1997–98)
- Most assists: Ryan Getzlaf, 66 (2008–09)
- Most points: Teemu Selänne, 109 (1996–97)
- Most penalty minutes: Todd Ewen, 285 (1995–96)
- Most goals, defenseman: Ľubomír Višňovský, 18 (2010–11)
- Most assists, defenseman: Scott Niedermayer, 54 (2006–07)
- Most points, defenseman: Scott Niedermayer, 69 (2006–07)
- Most goals, rookie: Bobby Ryan, 31 (2008–09)
- Most assists, rookie: Trevor Zegras, 38 (2021–22)
- Most points, rookie: Trevor Zegras, 61 (2021–22)
- Most wins: Jean-Sébastien Giguère, 36 (2006–07)
- Most shutouts: Jean-Sébastien Giguère, 8 (2002–03)

=== All-time franchise records ===
Regular season

- Most games: Ryan Getzlaf, 1,157
- Most goals: Teemu Selänne, 457
- Most assists: Ryan Getzlaf, 737
- Most points: Ryan Getzlaf, 1019
- Best plus/minus: Teemu Selänne, 120
- Most power-play goals: Teemu Selänne, 182
- Most game-winning goals: Teemu Selänne, 77
- Most overtime goals: Ryan Getzlaf, 11
- Most shots: Teemu Selänne, 2,964

Playoffs

- Most playoff games: Ryan Getzlaf, 121
- Most playoff goals: Ryan Getzlaf, 37
- Most playoff assists: Ryan Getzlaf, 81
- Most playoff points: Ryan Getzlaf, 118
- Most playoff power-play goals: Ryan Getzlaf and Teemu Selänne, 15
- Most playoff game-winning goals: Corey Perry and Teemu Selänne, 8
- Most playoff shots: Corey Perry, 328

== Broadcasters ==
- John Ahlers, TV play-by-play
- Brian Hayward, TV color analyst
- Steve Carroll, Radio play-by-play
- Emerson Etem, Radio color

Past announcers include Matt McConnell, Charlie Simmer (who was the radio analyst alongside McConnell from 1993 to 1996), Brian Hamilton (who was the radio play-by-play announcer from 1996 to 1999), Pat Conacher (who was the radio analyst from 1996–97), Darren Eliot (who was the radio analyst alongside Hamilton from 1996 to 1999), Mike Greenlay (who was the radio analyst from 1999 to 2001), Brent Severyn (who became the radio analyst beginning in 2005), and Chris Madsen (who was the television play-by-play announcer from 1993 to 2002).

As of the 2026–27 NHL season, Ducks games not broadcast by the NHL's national television partners are televised primarily by KCOP-TV, with selected games airing on its parent Fox station KTTV. Games also stream on Amazon Prime Video for Amazon Prime subscribers within the Ducks' market. Radio broadcasts are hosted on Ducks Stream, an online radio station available via TuneIn.

Disney planned to start an ESPN West regional sports network for the 1998–99 season, which would also carry Anaheim Angels baseball games, but the plan was abandoned. Until the 2024–25 NHL season, television broadcasts were on Bally Sports SoCal or Bally Sports West, with selected games on KCOP. The team briefly moved to Victory+ until the 2026–27 season.

== See also ==
- List of Anaheim Ducks draft picks
- List of Anaheim Ducks players

== Notes ==
Preceded by Carolina Hurricanes	Stanley Cup champions 2006–07	Succeeded by Detroit Red Wings
