= List of Anaheim Ducks draft picks =

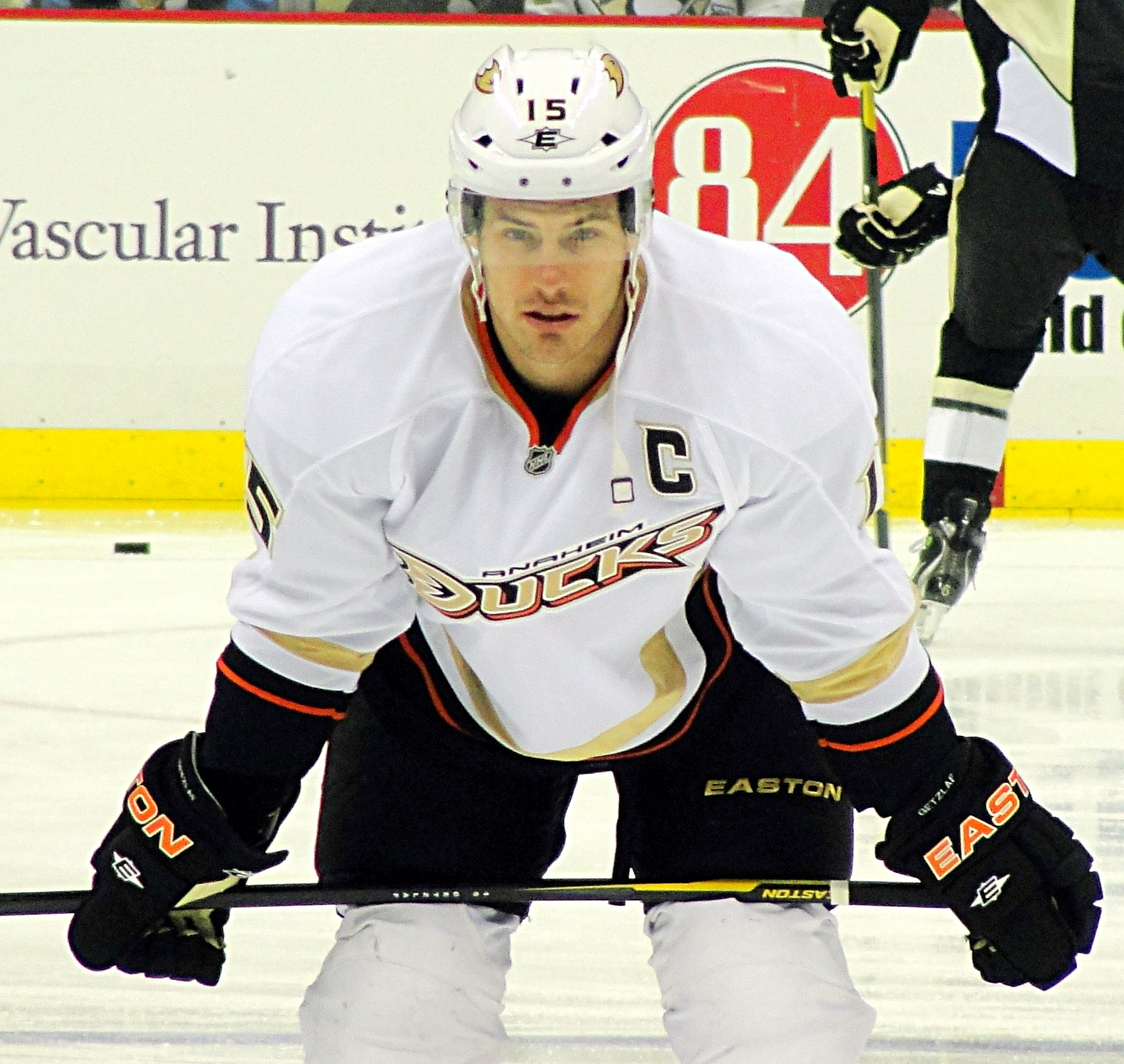
The Ducks selected Ryan Getzlaf 19th overall in the 2003 NHL entry draft.

This is a complete list of ice hockey players who were drafted in the National Hockey League Entry Draft by the Anaheim Ducks franchise. It includes every player who was drafted, regardless of whether they played for the team.

== Key ==
Played at least one game with the Ducks
Spent entire NHL career with the Ducks

General terms and abbreviations
Term or abbreviation	Definition
Draft	The year that the player was selected
Round	The round of the draft in which the player was selected
Pick	The overall position in the draft at which the player was selected
S	Supplemental draft selection

Position abbreviations
Abbreviation	Definition
G	Goaltender
D	Defense
LW	Left wing
C	Center
RW	Right wing
F	Forward

Abbreviations for statistical columns
Abbreviation	Definition
Pos	Position
GP	Games played
G	Goals
A	Assists
Pts	Points
PIM	Penalties in minutes
W	Wins
L	Losses
T	Ties
OT	Overtime/shootout losses
GAA	Goals against average
—	Does not apply

== Draft picks ==
Statistics are complete as of the 2025–26 NHL season and show each player's career regular season totals in the NHL. Wins, losses, ties, overtime losses and goals against average apply to goaltenders and are used only for players at that position.

Draft	Round	Pick	Player	Nationality	Pos	GP	G	A	Pts	PIM	W	L	T	OT	GAA
1993	1	4	Paul Kariya	Canada	LW	989	402	587	989	399	—	—	—	—	—
1993	2	30	Nikolai Tsulygin	Russia	D	22	0	1	1	8	—	—	—	—	—
1993	3	56	Valeri Karpov	Russia	LW	76	14	15	29	32	—	—	—	—	—
1993	4	82	Joel Gagnon	Canada	G	—	—	—	—	—	—	—	—	—	—
1993	5	108	Mikhail Shtalenkov	Russia	G	190	0	6	6	14	62	82	19	—	2.89
1993	6	134	Antti Aalto	Finland	C	151	11	17	28	52	—	—	—	—	—
1993	7	160	Matt Peterson	United States	D	—	—	—	—	—	—	—	—	—	—
1993	8	186	Tom Askey	United States	G	7	0	0	0	0	0	1	2	—	2.64
1993	9	212	Vitaly Kozel	Belarus	C	—	—	—	—	—	—	—	—	—	—
1993	10	238	Anatoli Fedotov	Russia	D	4	0	2	2	0	—	—	—	—	—
1993	11	264	David Penney	United States	LW	—	—	—	—	—	—	—	—	—	—
1993	S	5	Pat Thompson	Canada	D	—	—	—	—	—	—	—	—	—	—
1994	1	2	Oleg Tverdovsky	Russia	D	713	77	240	317	291	—	—	—	—	—
1994	2	28	Johan Davidsson	Sweden	C	83	6	9	15	16	—	—	—	—	—
1994	3	67	Craig Reichert	Canada	RW	3	0	0	0	0	—	—	—	—	—
1994	4	80	Byron Briske	Canada	D	—	—	—	—	—	—	—	—	—	—
1994	5	106	Pavel Trnka	Czech Republic	D	411	14	63	77	323	—	—	—	—	—
1994	6	132	Bates Battaglia	United States	LW	580	80	118	198	385	—	—	—	—	—
1994	7	158	Rocky Welsing	United States	D	—	—	—	—	—	—	—	—	—	—
1994	8	184	Brad Englehart	Canada	LW	—	—	—	—	—	—	—	—	—	—
1994	10	236	Tommi Miettinen	Finland	LW	—	—	—	—	—	—	—	—	—	—
1994	11	262	Jeremy Stevenson	United States	LW	207	19	19	38	451	—	—	—	—	—
1994	S	2	Steve Rucchin	Canada	C	735	171	318	489	164	—	—	—	—	—
1995	1	4	Chad Kilger	Canada	RW	714	107	111	218	363	—	—	—	—	—
1995	2	29	Brian Wesenberg	Canada	RW	1	0	0	0	5	—	—	—	—	—
1995	3	55	Mike Leclerc	Canada	LW	341	64	94	158	288	—	—	—	—	—
1995	5	107	Igor Nikulin	Russia	RW	0	0	0	0	0	—	—	—	—	—
1995	6	133	Peter Leboutillier	Canada	RW	35	2	1	3	176	—	—	—	—	—
1995	7	159	Mike LaPlante	Canada	D	—	—	—	—	—	—	—	—	—	—
1995	8	185	Igor Karpenko	Ukraine	G	—	—	—	—	—	—	—	—	—	—
1996	1	9	Ruslan Salei	Belarus	D	917	45	159	204	1065	—	—	—	—	—
1996	2	35	Matt Cullen	United States	C	1516	266	465	731	592	—	—	—	—	—
1996	5	117	Brendan Buckley	United States	D	—	—	—	—	—	—	—	—	—	—
1996	6	149	Blaine Russell	Canada	G	—	—	—	—	—	—	—	—	—	—
1996	7	172	Timo Ahmaoja	Finland	D	—	—	—	—	—	—	—	—	—	—
1996	8	198	Kevin Kellett	Canada	D	—	—	—	—	—	—	—	—	—	—
1996	9	224	Tobias Johansson	Sweden	D	—	—	—	—	—	—	—	—	—	—
1997	1	18	Michael Holmqvist	Sweden	C	156	18	17	35	72	—	—	—	—	—
1997	2	45	Maxim Balmochnykh	Russia	LW	6	0	1	1	2	—	—	—	—	—
1997	3	72	Jay Legault	Canada	RW	—	—	—	—	—	—	—	—	—	—
1997	5	125	Luc Vaillancourt	Canada	G	—	—	—	—	—	—	—	—	—	—
1997	7	178	Tony Mohagen	Canada	LW	—	—	—	—	—	—	—	—	—	—
1997	7	181	Mat Snesrud	United States	D	—	—	—	—	—	—	—	—	—	—
1997	8	209	Rene Stussi	Switzerland	C	—	—	—	—	—	—	—	—	—	—
1997	9	235	Tommi Degerman	Finland	C	—	—	—	—	—	—	—	—	—	—
1998	1	5	Vitaly Vishnevskiy	Russia	D	552	16	52	68	494	—	—	—	—	—
1998	2	32	Stephen Peat	Canada	RW	130	8	2	10	234	—	—	—	—	—
1998	4	112	Viktor Wallin	Sweden	D	—	—	—	—	—	—	—	—	—	—
1998	6	150	Trent Hunter	Canada	RW	497	101	135	236	209	—	—	—	—	—
1998	7	178	Jesse Fibiger	Canada	D	16	0	0	0	2	—	—	—	—	—
1998	8	205	David Bernier	Canada	RW	—	—	—	—	—	—	—	—	—	—
1998	9	233	Pelle Prestberg	Sweden	RW	—	—	—	—	—	—	—	—	—	—
1998	9	245	Andreas Andersson	Sweden	G	—	—	—	—	—	—	—	—	—	—
1999	2	44	Jordan Leopold	United States	D	695	67	147	214	293	—	—	—	—	—
1999	3	83	Niclas Havelid	Sweden	D	628	34	137	171	342	—	—	—	—	—
1999	4	105	Alexander Chagodayev	Russia	F	—	—	—	—	—	—	—	—	—	—
1999	5	141	Maxim Rybin	Russia	LW	—	—	—	—	—	—	—	—	—	—
1999	6	173	Jan Sandstrom	Sweden	D	—	—	—	—	—	—	—	—	—	—
1999	8	230	Petr Tenkrat	Czech Republic	RW	177	22	30	52	84	—	—	—	—	—
1999	9	258	Brian Gornick	United States	C	—	—	—	—	—	—	—	—	—	—
2000	1	12	Alexei Smirnov	Russia	C	52	3	3	6	20	—	—	—	—	—
2000	2	44	Ilya Bryzgalov	Russia	G	465	0	12	12	20	221	162	0	54	2.58
2000	4	98	Jonas Ronnqvist	Sweden	LW	38	0	4	4	14	—	—	—	—	—
2000	5	134	Peter Podhradsky	Slovakia	D	—	—	—	—	—	—	—	—	—	—
2000	5	153	Bill Cass	United States	D	—	—	—	—	—	—	—	—	—	—
2001	1	5	Stanislav Chistov	Russia	LW	196	19	42	61	116	—	—	—	—	—
2001	2	35	Mark Popovic	Canada	D	81	2	5	7	20	—	—	—	—	—
2001	3	69	Joel Stepp	Canada	C	—	—	—	—	—	—	—	—	—	—
2001	4	102	Timo Parssinen	Finland	LW	17	0	3	3	2	—	—	—	—	—
2001	4	105	Vladimir Korsunov	Russia	D	—	—	—	—	—	—	—	—	—	—
2001	4	118	Brandon Rogers	United States	D	—	—	—	—	—	—	—	—	—	—
2001	5	137	Joel Perrault	Canada	C	96	12	14	26	68	—	—	—	—	—
2001	6	170	Jan Tabacek	Slovakia	D	—	—	—	—	—	—	—	—	—	—
2001	7	224	Tony Martensson	Sweden	C	6	1	1	2	0	—	—	—	—	—
2001	8	232	Martin Gerber	Switzerland	G	229	0	7	7	30	113	78	7	14	2.63
2001	9	264	P. A. Parenteau	Canada	RW	491	114	182	296	342	—	—	—	—	—
2002	1	7	Joffrey Lupul	Canada	RW	701	205	215	420	407	—	—	—	—	—
2002	2	37	Tim Brent	Canada	C	207	21	27	48	76	—	—	—	—	—
2002	3	71	Brian Lee	United States	D	—	—	—	—	—	—	—	—	—	—
2002	4	103	Joonas Vihko	Finland	F	—	—	—	—	—	—	—	—	—	—
2002	5	140	George Davis	Canada	RW	—	—	—	—	—	—	—	—	—	—
2002	6	173	Luke Fritshaw	Canada	D	—	—	—	—	—	—	—	—	—	—
2002	9	261	Francois Caron	Canada	D	—	—	—	—	—	—	—	—	—	—
2002	9	267	Chris Petrow	Canada	D	—	—	—	—	—	—	—	—	—	—
2003	1	19	Ryan Getzlaf	Canada	C	1157	282	737	1019	960	—	—	—	—	—
2003	1	28	Corey Perry	Canada	RW	1464	465	507	972	1568	—	—	—	—	—
2003	3	86	Shane Hynes	Canada	F	—	—	—	—	—	—	—	—	—	—
2003	3	90	Juha Alen	Finland	D	—	—	—	—	—	—	—	—	—	—
2003	4	119	Nathan Saunders	Canada	D	—	—	—	—	—	—	—	—	—	—
2003	6	186	Drew Miller	United States	LW	571	62	60	122	136	—	—	—	—	—
2003	7	218	Dirk Southern	United States	F	—	—	—	—	—	—	—	—	—	—
2003	8	250	Shane O'Brien	Canada	D	537	13	79	92	916	—	—	—	—	—
2003	9	280	Ville Mantymaa	Finland	D	—	—	—	—	—	—	—	—	—	—
2004	1	9	Ladislav Smid	Czech Republic	D	583	12	60	72	472	—	—	—	—	—
2004	2	39	Jordan Smith	Canada	D	—	—	—	—	—	—	—	—	—	—
2004	3	74	Kyle Klubertanz	United States	D	—	—	—	—	—	—	—	—	—	—
2004	3	75	Tim Brent	Canada	C	207	21	27	48	76	—	—	—	—	—
2004	6	172	Matt Auffrey	United States	RW	—	—	—	—	—	—	—	—	—	—
2004	7	203	Gabriel Bouthillette	Canada	G	—	—	—	—	—	—	—	—	—	—
2004	8	236	Matt Christie	Canada	C	—	—	—	—	—	—	—	—	—	—
2004	9	269	Janne Pesonen	Finland	LW	7	0	0	0	0	—	—	—	—	—
2005	1	2	Bobby Ryan	United States	RW	866	261	308	569	470	—	—	—	—	—
2005	2	31	Brendan Mikkelson	Canada	D	131	1	9	10	59	—	—	—	—	—
2005	3	63	Jason Bailey	Canada	RW	—	—	—	—	—	—	—	—	—	—
2005	5	127	Bobby Bolt	Canada	LW	—	—	—	—	—	—	—	—	—	—
2005	5	141	Brian Salcido	United States	D	2	0	1	1	0	—	—	—	—	—
2005	7	197	Jean-Philippe Levasseur	Canada	G	—	—	—	—	—	—	—	—	—	—
2006	1	19	Mark Mitera	United States	D	—	—	—	—	—	—	—	—	—	—
2006	2	38	Bryce Swan	Canada	RW	—	—	—	—	—	—	—	—	—	—
2006	3	83	John de Gray	Canada	D	—	—	—	—	—	—	—	—	—	—
2006	4	112	Matt Beleskey	Canada	LW	477	76	82	158	440	—	—	—	—	—
2006	6	172	Petteri Wirtanen	Finland	C	3	1	0	1	2	—	—	—	—	—
2007	1	19	Logan MacMillan	Canada	C	—	—	—	—	—	—	—	—	—	—
2007	2	42	Eric Tangradi	United States	LW	150	5	11	16	86	—	—	—	—	—
2007	3	63	Maxime Macenauer	Canada	C	29	1	3	4	18	—	—	—	—	—
2007	4	92	Justin Vaive	United States	LW	—	—	—	—	—	—	—	—	—	—
2007	4	93	Steven Kampfer	United States	D	231	15	24	39	110	—	—	—	—	—
2007	4	98	Sebastian Stefaniszin	Germany	G	—	—	—	—	—	—	—	—	—	—
2007	4	121	Mattias Modig	Sweden	G	—	—	—	—	—	—	—	—	—	—
2007	5	151	Brett Morrison	Canada	C	—	—	—	—	—	—	—	—	—	—
2008	1	17	Jake Gardiner	United States	D	645	49	228	277	226	—	—	—	—	—
2008	2	35	Nicolas Deschamps	Canada	LW	3	0	0	0	0	—	—	—	—	—
2008	2	39	Eric O'Dell	Canada	C	41	3	5	8	29	—	—	—	—	—
2008	2	43	Justin Schultz	Canada	D	745	71	253	324	198	—	—	—	—	—
2008	3	71	Josh Brittain	Canada	LW	—	—	—	—	—	—	—	—	—	—
2008	3	83	Marco Cousineau	Canada	G	—	—	—	—	—	—	—	—	—	—
2008	3	85	Brandon McMillan	Canada	LW	171	14	22	36	60	—	—	—	—	—
2008	4	113	Ryan Hegarty	United States	D	—	—	—	—	—	—	—	—	—	—
2008	5	143	Stefan Warg	Sweden	D	—	—	—	—	—	—	—	—	—	—
2008	7	208	Nick Pryor	United States	D	—	—	—	—	—	—	—	—	—	—
2009	1	15	Peter Holland	Canada	C	266	36	49	85	112	—	—	—	—	—
2009	1	26	Kyle Palmieri	United States	RW	925	276	269	545	443	—	—	—	—	—
2009	2	37	Mat Clark	Canada	D	9	0	1	1	6	—	—	—	—	—
2009	3	76	Igor Bobkov	Russia	G	—	—	—	—	—	—	—	—	—	—
2009	4	106	Sami Vatanen	Finland	D	473	47	153	200	212	—	—	—	—	—
2009	5	136	Radoslav Illo	Slovakia	C	—	—	—	—	—	—	—	—	—	—
2009	6	166	Scott Valentine	Canada	D	—	—	—	—	—	—	—	—	—	—
2010	1	12	Cam Fowler	United States	D	1124	109	414	523	283	—	—	—	—	—
2010	1	29	Emerson Etem	United States	RW	173	22	24	46	30	—	—	—	—	—
2010	2	42	Devante Smith-Pelly	Canada	LW	395	44	57	101	137	—	—	—	—	—
2010	5	122	Chris Wagner	United States	C	401	39	27	66	218	—	—	—	—	—
2010	5	132	Tim Heed	Sweden	D	105	6	23	29	20	—	—	—	—	—
2010	6	161	Andreas Dahlstrom	Sweden	C	—	—	—	—	—	—	—	—	—	—
2010	6	167	Kevin Lind	United States	D	—	—	—	—	—	—	—	—	—	—
2010	7	192	Brett Perlini	Canada	F	—	—	—	—	—	—	—	—	—	—
2011	1	30	Rickard Rakell	Sweden	LW	862	260	307	567	180	—	—	—	—	—
2011	2	39	John Gibson	United States	G	563	0	8	8	76	233	239	—	67	2.87
2011	2	53	William Karlsson	Sweden	C	752	183	270	453	116	—	—	—	—	—
2011	3	65	Joseph Cramarossa	Canada	F	68	5	8	13	81	—	—	—	—	—
2011	3	83	Andy Welinski	United States	D	46	1	5	6	8	—	—	—	—	—
2011	5	143	Max Friberg	Sweden	LW	6	0	0	0	2	—	—	—	—	—
2011	6	160	Josh Manson	United States	D	705	44	157	201	691	—	—	—	—	—
2012	1	6	Hampus Lindholm	Sweden	D	829	78	261	339	499	—	—	—	—	—
2012	2	36	Nicolas Kerdiles	United States	F	3	0	0	0	0	—	—	—	—	—
2012	3	87	Frederik Andersen	Denmark	G	552	0	17	17	30	324	149	—	58	2.59
2012	4	97	Kevin Roy	Canada	F	28	6	1	7	6	—	—	—	—	—
2012	4	108	Andrew O'Brien	Canada	D	—	—	—	—	—	—	—	—	—	—
2012	5	127	Brian Cooper	United States	D	—	—	—	—	—	—	—	—	—	—
2012	7	187	Kenton Helgesen	Canada	D	—	—	—	—	—	—	—	—	—	—
2012	7	210	Jaycob Megna	United States	D	197	4	23	27	77	—	—	—	—	—
2013	1	26	Shea Theodore	Canada	D	634	88	314	402	201	—	—	—	—	—
2013	2	45	Nick Sorensen	Sweden	RW	5	0	1	1	2	—	—	—	—	—
2013	3	87	Keaton Thompson	United States	D	—	—	—	—	—	—	—	—	—	—
2013	5	147	Grant Besse	United States	RW	—	—	—	—	—	—	—	—	—	—
2013	6	177	Miro Aaltonen	Finland	C	—	—	—	—	—	—	—	—	—	—
2014	1	10	Nick Ritchie	Canada	LW	481	84	102	186	483	—	—	—	—	—
2014	2	38	Marcus Pettersson	Sweden	D	604	21	159	180	374	—	—	—	—	—
2014	2	55	Brandon Montour	Canada	D	665	95	230	325	496	—	—	—	—	—
2014	5	123	Matthew Berkovitz	United States	D	—	—	—	—	—	—	—	—	—	—
2014	7	205	Ondrej Kase	Czech Republic	RW	258	57	67	124	62	—	—	—	—	—
2015	1	27	Jacob Larsson	Sweden	D	172	3	21	24	52	—	—	—	—	—
2015	2	59	Julius Nattinen	Finland	C	—	—	—	—	—	—	—	—	—	—
2015	3	80	Brent Gates	United States	C	—	—	—	—	—	—	—	—	—	—
2015	3	84	Deven Sideroff	Canada	RW	—	—	—	—	—	—	—	—	—	—
2015	5	148	Troy Terry	United States	RW	488	135	207	342	132	—	—	—	—	—
2015	6	178	Steven Ruggiero	United States	D	—	—	—	—	—	—	—	—	—	—
2015	6	179	Garrett Metcalf	United States	G	—	—	—	—	—	—	—	—	—	—
2016	1	24	Max Jones	United States	LW	305	35	34	69	238	—	—	—	—	—
2016	1	30	Sam Steel	Canada	C	491	61	114	175	154	—	—	—	—	—
2016	3	85	Josh Mahura	Canada	D	278	11	46	57	126	—	—	—	—	—
2016	4	93	Jack Kopacka	United States	LW	—	—	—	—	—	—	—	—	—	—
2016	4	115	Alex Dostie	Canada	C	—	—	—	—	—	—	—	—	—	—
2016	7	205	Tyler Soy	Canada	C	—	—	—	—	—	—	—	—	—	—
2017	2	50	Maxime Comtois	Canada	LW	211	38	49	87	193	—	—	—	—	—
2017	2	60	Antoine Morand	Canada	C	—	—	—	—	—	—	—	—	—	—
2017	3	91	Jack Badini	United States	C	—	—	—	—	—	—	—	—	—	—
2017	4	122	Kyle Olson	Canada	C	—	—	—	—	—	—	—	—	—	—
2017	5	153	Olle Eriksson Ek	Sweden	G	1	0	0	0	0	0	0	—	1	4.69
2018	1	23	Isac Lundestrom	Sweden	C	405	39	57	96	42	—	—	—	—	—
2018	2	54	Benoit-Olivier Groulx	Canada	C	78	4	6	10	24	—	—	—	—	—
2018	3	79	Blake McLaughlin	United States	LW	—	—	—	—	—	—	—	—	—	—
2018	3	85	Lukas Dostal	Czech Republic	G	177	0	1	1	16	72	78	—	17	3.23
2018	4	116	Jack Perbix	United States	RW	—	—	—	—	—	—	—	—	—	—
2018	5	147	Roman Durny	Slovakia	G	—	—	—	—	—	—	—	—	—	—
2018	6	178	Hunter Drew	Canada	D	2	0	0	0	5	—	—	—	—	—
2019	1	9	Trevor Zegras	United States	C	349	93	160	253	265	—	—	—	—	—
2019	1	29	Brayden Tracey	Canada	LW	1	0	0	0	0	—	—	—	—	—
2019	2	39	Jackson Lacombe	United States	D	230	26	92	118	71	—	—	—	—	—
2019	4	101	Henry Thrun	United States	D	123	5	20	25	46	—	—	—	—	—
2019	5	132	Trevor Janicke	United States	C	—	—	—	—	—	—	—	—	—	—
2019	6	163	William Francis	United States	D	—	—	—	—	—	—	—	—	—	—
2019	6	186	Matthew Hill	Canada	D	—	—	—	—	—	—	—	—	—	—
2020	1	6	Jamie Drysdale	Canada	D	295	25	77	102	87	—	—	—	—	—
2020	1	27	Jacob Perreault	Canada	RW	1	0	0	0	0	—	—	—	—	—
2020	2	36	Sam Colangelo	United States	RW	44	12	2	14	8	—	—	—	—	—
2020	3	67	Ian Moore	United States	D	70	4	9	13	24	—	—	—	—	—
2020	4	104	Thimo Nickl	Austria	D	—	—	—	—	—	—	—	—	—	—
2020	5	129	Artyom Galimov	Russia	C	—	—	—	—	—	—	—	—	—	—
2020	6	160	Albin Sundsvik	Sweden	C	—	—	—	—	—	—	—	—	—	—
2020	7	207	Ethan Bowen	Canada	C	—	—	—	—	—	—	—	—	—	—
2021	1	3	Mason McTavish	Canada	C	304	77	104	181	212	—	—	—	—	—
2021	2	34	Olen Zellweger	Canada	D	164	16	35	51	58	—	—	—	—	—
2021	3	66	Sasha Pastujov	United States	RW	—	—	—	—	—	—	—	—	—	—
2021	3	76	Tyson Hinds	Canada	D	6	0	0	0	2	—	—	—	—	—
2021	4	98	Josh Lopina	United States	C	—	—	—	—	—	—	—	—	—	—
2021	5	130	Sean Tschigerl	Canada	LW	—	—	—	—	—	—	—	—	—	—
2021	5	148	Gage Alexander	Canada	G	—	—	—	—	—	—	—	—	—	—
2021	6	162	Kyle Kukkonen	United States	C	—	—	—	—	—	—	—	—	—	—
2022	1	10	Pavel Mintyukov	Russia	D	204	17	52	69	61	—	—	—	—	—
2022	1	22	Nathan Gaucher	Canada	C	3	0	0	0	0	—	—	—	—	—
2022	2	42	Noah Warren	Canada	D	—	—	—	—	—	—	—	—	—	—
2022	2	53	Tristan Luneau	Canada	D	14	2	2	4	6	—	—	—	—	—
2022	4	107	Ben King	Canada	C	—	—	—	—	—	—	—	—	—	—
2022	5	139	Connor Hvidston	Canada	LW	—	—	—	—	—	—	—	—	—	—
2022	5	154	Michael Callow	United States	RW	—	—	—	—	—	—	—	—	—	—
2022	6	178	Vyacheslav Buteyets	Russia	G	1	0	0	0	0	0	0	—	0	9.00
2023	1	2	Leo Carlsson	Sweden	C	201	61	80	141	63	—	—	—	—	—
2023	2	33	Nico Myatovic	Canada	LW	—	—	—	—	—	—	—	—	—	—
2023	2	59	Carey Terrance	United States	C	—	—	—	—	—	—	—	—	—	—
2023	2	60	Damian Clara	Italy	G	—	—	—	—	—	—	—	—	—	—
2023	3	65	Coulson Pitre	Canada	RW	—	—	—	—	—	—	—	—	—	—
2023	3	85	Yegor Sidorov	Belarus	RW	—	—	—	—	—	—	—	—	—	—
2023	4	97	Konnor Smith	Canada	D	—	—	—	—	—	—	—	—	—	—
2023	5	129	Rodwin Dionicio	United States	D	—	—	—	—	—	—	—	—	—	—
2023	6	161	Vojtech Port	Czechia	D	—	—	—	—	—	—	—	—	—	—
2024	1	3	Beckett Sennecke	Canada	RW	82	23	37	60	62	—	—	—	—	—
2024	1	23	Stian Solberg	Norway	D	—	—	—	—	—	—	—	—	—	—
2024	2	35	Lucas Pettersson	Sweden	C	—	—	—	—	—	—	—	—	—	—
2024	3	66	Maxim Masse	Canada	RW	—	—	—	—	—	—	—	—	—	—
2024	3	68	Ethan Procyszyn	Canada	C	—	—	—	—	—	—	—	—	—	—
2024	3	79	Tarin Smith	Canada	D	—	—	—	—	—	—	—	—	—	—
2024	4	100	Alexandre Blais	Canada	C	—	—	—	—	—	—	—	—	—	—
2024	6	182	Austin Burnevik	United States	RW	—	—	—	—	—	—	—	—	—	—
2024	7	214	Darels Uljanskis	Latvia	D	—	—	—	—	—	—	—	—	—	—
2025	1	10	Roger McQueen	Canada	C	—	—	—	—	—	—	—	—	—	—
2025	2	45	Eric Nilson	Sweden	C	—	—	—	—	—	—	—	—	—	—
2025	2	60	Lasse Boelius	Finland	D	—	—	—	—	—	—	—	—	—	—
2025	3	72	Noah Read	Canada	C	—	—	—	—	—	—	—	—	—	—
2025	4	101	Drew Schock	United States	D	—	—	—	—	—	—	—	—	—	—
2025	4	104	Elijah Neuenschwander	Switzerland	G	—	—	—	—	—	—	—	—	—	—
2025	5	136	Alexis Mathieu	Canada	D	—	—	—	—	—	—	—	—	—	—
2025	5	159	Émile Guité	Canada	LW	—	—	—	—	—	—	—	—	—	—
2025	6	168	Anthony Allain-Samaké	Canada	D	—	—	—	—	—	—	—	—	—	—
2025	7	200	Brady Turko	Canada	RW	—	—	—	—	—	—	—	—	—	—
2026	1	15	Nikita Klepov	United States	RW	—	—	—	—	—	—	—	—	—	—
2026	1	28	Marcus Nordmark	Sweden	LW	—	—	—	—	—	—	—	—	—	—
2026	2	45	Jayden Kurtz	United States	D	—	—	—	—	—	—	—	—	—	—
2026	2	50	Mathis Preston	Canada	RW	—	—	—	—	—	—	—	—	—	—
2026	3	82	Rian Chudzinski	United States	RW	—	—	—	—	—	—	—	—	—	—
2026	5	146	Eric Frossard	Canada	D	—	—	—	—	—	—	—	—	—	—
2026	6	178	Gleb Peshkov	Russia	G	—	—	—	—	—	—	—	—	—	—
2026	6	192	Noah Kosick	Germany	C	—	—	—	—	—	—	—	—	—	—
2026	7	210	James Rieber	United States	D	—	—	—	—	—	—	—	—	—	—

== See also ==
- 1993 NHL Expansion Draft
