= Pavel Mintyukov =

Russian ice hockey player (born 2003)

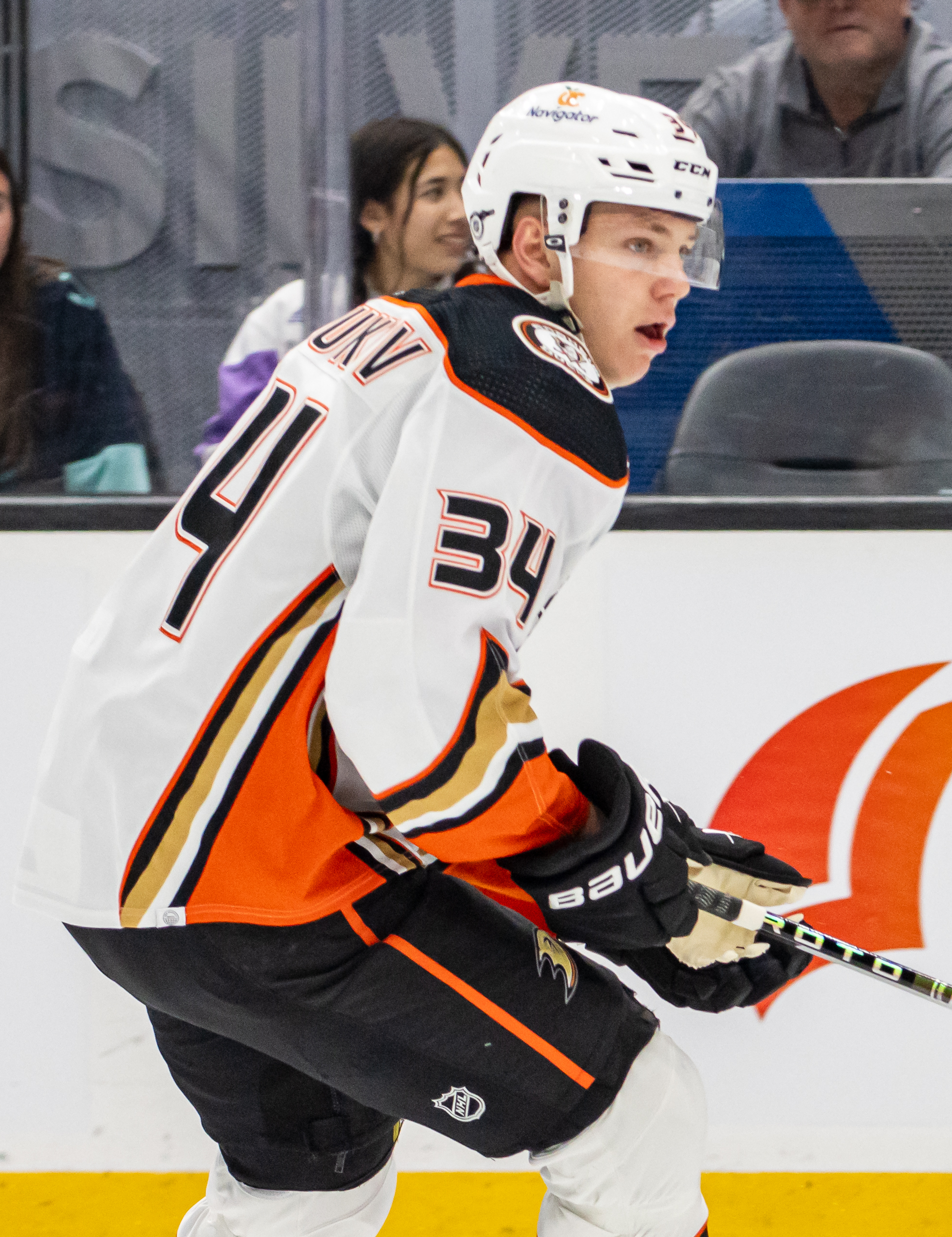
- Mintyukov on the Anaheim Ducks in March 2024
- Born: 25 November 2003 (age 22) Moscow, Russia
- Height: 6 ft 1 in (185 cm)
- Weight: 207 lb (94 kg; 14 st 11 lb)
- Position: Defence
- Shoots: Left
- NHL team: Anaheim Ducks
- NHL draft: 10th overall, 2022; Anaheim Ducks
- Playing career: 2023–present

Pavel Alexeyevich Mintyukov (Russian: Павел Алексеевич Минтюков; born 25 November 2003) is a Russian professional ice hockey player who is a defenceman for the Anaheim Ducks of the National Hockey League (NHL). He was drafted 10th overall by the Ducks in the 2022 NHL entry draft.

== Playing career ==
=== Amateur ===
As a youth, Mintyukov played in his native Russia, featuring within the junior ranks of HC Dynamo Moscow. Following a single season in the MHL with MHC Dynamo Moscow, Mintyukov was drafted in the 2020 CHL Import Draft in the first round, 52nd overall, by the Saginaw Spirit of the Ontario Hockey League (OHL). Mintyukov signed to a contract with the Spirit on 7 July 2020. With the 2020–21 season cancelled due to the COVID-19 pandemic shutdown, Mintyukov returned for the following 2021–22 season, and impressed in showing his offensive acumen from the blueline in posting 17 goals and 45 assist for 62 points in 67 regular season games. He was named to the OHL Third All-Star Team.

Mintyukov began the 2022–23 season with the Spirit, notching 16 goals and 54 points in just 37 regular season games before he was traded to contending OHL club, the Ottawa 67's, in exchange for nine draft picks on 10 January 2023. He was the first defenceman to be named OHL defenceman of the month, for three months consecutively (October–December). He helped lead the 67's to the top of the league, winning the Hamilton Spectator Trophy. He scored 24 goals and 88 points, best among all OHL defencemen, which led to him winning the Max Kaminsky Trophy as the league's best defencemen. However, the 67's were eliminated in the second round of the OHL playoffs.

=== Professional ===
Mintyukov was selected by the Anaheim Ducks of the National Hockey League (NHL) in the first round, 10th overall, of the 2022 NHL entry draft. He was soon signed to a three-year, entry-level contract with the Ducks on 16 July 2022. Mintyukov made his NHL debut in the Ducks 2023–24 season opener on the third defence pair alongside Ilya Lyubushkin in a 4–1 loss to the Vegas Golden Knights on 15 October 2023. He scored his first NHL goal against Antti Raanta in Anaheim's 6–3 win over the Carolina Hurricanes on 16 October.

On 5 July 2026 as a restricted free agent, Mintyukov signed a five-year, $36 million contract with the Ducks.

== Career statistics ==
=== Regular season and playoffs ===
			Regular season					Playoffs
Season	Team	League	GP	G	A	Pts	PIM	GP	G	A	Pts	PIM
2019–20	MHC Dynamo Moscow	MHL	33	1	2	3	0	3	0	0	0	0
2021–22	Saginaw Spirit	OHL	67	17	45	62	28	—	—	—	—	—
2022–23	Saginaw Spirit	OHL	37	16	38	54	15	—	—	—	—	—
2022–23	Ottawa 67's	OHL	32	8	26	34	11	11	0	9	9	2
2023–24	Anaheim Ducks	NHL	63	4	24	28	24	—	—	—	—	—
2024–25	Anaheim Ducks	NHL	68	5	14	19	20	—	—	—	—	—
2025–26	Anaheim Ducks	NHL	73	8	14	22	17	12	0	0	0	4
NHL totals			204	17	52	69	61	12	0	0	0	4

=== International ===
Year	Team	Event	Result	GP	G	A	Pts	PIM
2019	Russia	U17	1st place, gold medalist(s)	6	0	5	5	2
Junior totals				6	0	5	5	2

== Awards and honours ==
Award	Year	Ref
OHL
Third All-Star Team	2022	

Awards and achievements
Preceded by Mason McTavish	Anaheim Ducks first-round draft pick 2022	Succeeded by Nathan Gaucher
