= Nikita Klepov =

Russian ice hockey player (born 2008)

- Born: June 27, 2008 (age 18) Deerfield Beach, Florida, U.S.
- Height: 6 ft 0 in (183 cm)
- Weight: 192 lb (87 kg; 13 st 10 lb)
- Position: Forward
- Shoots: Left
- NHL team: Anaheim Ducks
- NHL draft: 15th overall, 2026; Anaheim Ducks
- Playing career: 2026–present

Nikita Klepov (born June 27, 2008) is an American professional ice hockey player who is a forward for the Anaheim Ducks of the National Hockey League (NHL). He was drafted 15th overall by the Ducks in the 2026 NHL entry draft.

== Early life ==
Klepov was born in Deerfield Beach, Florida to Russian parents who were visiting relatives in the area. The family returned to Russia before Nikita's first birthday, and Nikita would move back to the US when he was 15 to play for the Wilkes-Barre/Scranton Knights.

== Playing career ==
=== Junior ===
On July 2, 2025, Klepov was drafted 35th overall by the Saginaw Spirit in the 2025 CHL Import Draft. On August 7, 2025, he signed a standard player agreement with the Spirit. During the 2025–26 season, he led the Ontario Hockey League (OHL) in scoring with 37 goals and 60 assists in 67 regular season games. In October 2025, he led all rookies in scoring with ten goals and 13 assists in 15 games. He was subsequently named the OHL Rookie of the Month. In January 2026, he led all rookies in scoring with eight goals and 11 assists in 12 games, recording five multi-point games. He was subsequently named the OHL Rookie of the Month. In February tied for the lead in scoring with six goals and 17 assists in 12 games and was subsequently named the OHL Rookie of the Month for the second consecutive month. He tied Marco Rossi's record of three OHL Rookie of the Month honors in a single season. On February 14, 2026, he recorded his 75th point of the season, setting a new Spirit single-season rookie scoring record, surpassing the previous record of 74 points set by Cole Perfetti in 2019. Following the season he won the Eddie Powers Memorial Trophy, as the league's top scorer, and Jim Mahon Memorial Trophy, as the league's top-scoring right wing. He also won the Emms Family Award as Rookie of the Year. He became the first rookie within his first two years of OHL eligibility to claim the award since Jack Valiquette during the 1973–74 season. He's also the first American player to lead the OHL in scoring since Jason Robertson during the 2018–19 season. Klepov was committed to play college ice hockey for Michigan State during the 2026–27 season.

=== Professional ===
On June 26, 2026, Klepov was drafted in the first round, 15th overall, by the Anaheim Ducks in the 2026 NHL entry draft. He was then signed by the Ducks to a three-year, entry-level contract on July 25, 2026, foregoing his commitment to Michigan State. He made the Ducks' opening night roster for the 2026–27 NHL season, and made his NHL debut on October 7, 2026, against the Edmonton Oilers. Following four NHL games in which Klepov was scoreless and had 6 penalty minutes, he was returned to juniors.

== International play ==
A dual citizen of the United States and Russia, Klepov represented the United States at the 2025 Hlinka Gretzky Cup, but remains eligible to represent Russia, and is currently on hiatus from international hockey in hopes of playing for Russia should they be reinstated to the IIHF.

== Career statistics ==
=== Regular season and playoffs ===
			Regular season					Playoffs
Season	Team	League	GP	G	A	Pts	PIM	GP	G	A	Pts	PIM
2024–25	Sioux City Musketeers	USHL	59	12	19	31	20	5	1	1	2	4
2025–26	Saginaw Spirit	OHL	67	37	60	97	43	4	1	4	5	6
OHL totals			67	37	60	97	43	4	1	4	5	6

=== International ===
Year	Team	Event	Result	GP	G	A	Pts	PIM
2025	United States	HG18	1st place, gold medalist(s)	5	1	5	6	0
Junior totals				5	1	5	6	0

== Awards and honors ==
Award	Year	Ref
OHL
First All-Rookie Team	2026	
First All-Star Team	2026	
Emms Family Award	2026	
Eddie Powers Memorial Trophy	2026	
Jim Mahon Memorial Trophy	2026	

Awards and achievements
Preceded by Roger McQueen	Anaheim Ducks first-round draft pick 2026	Succeeded by Marcus Nordmark
