= Leo Carlsson =

Swedish ice hockey player (born 2004)

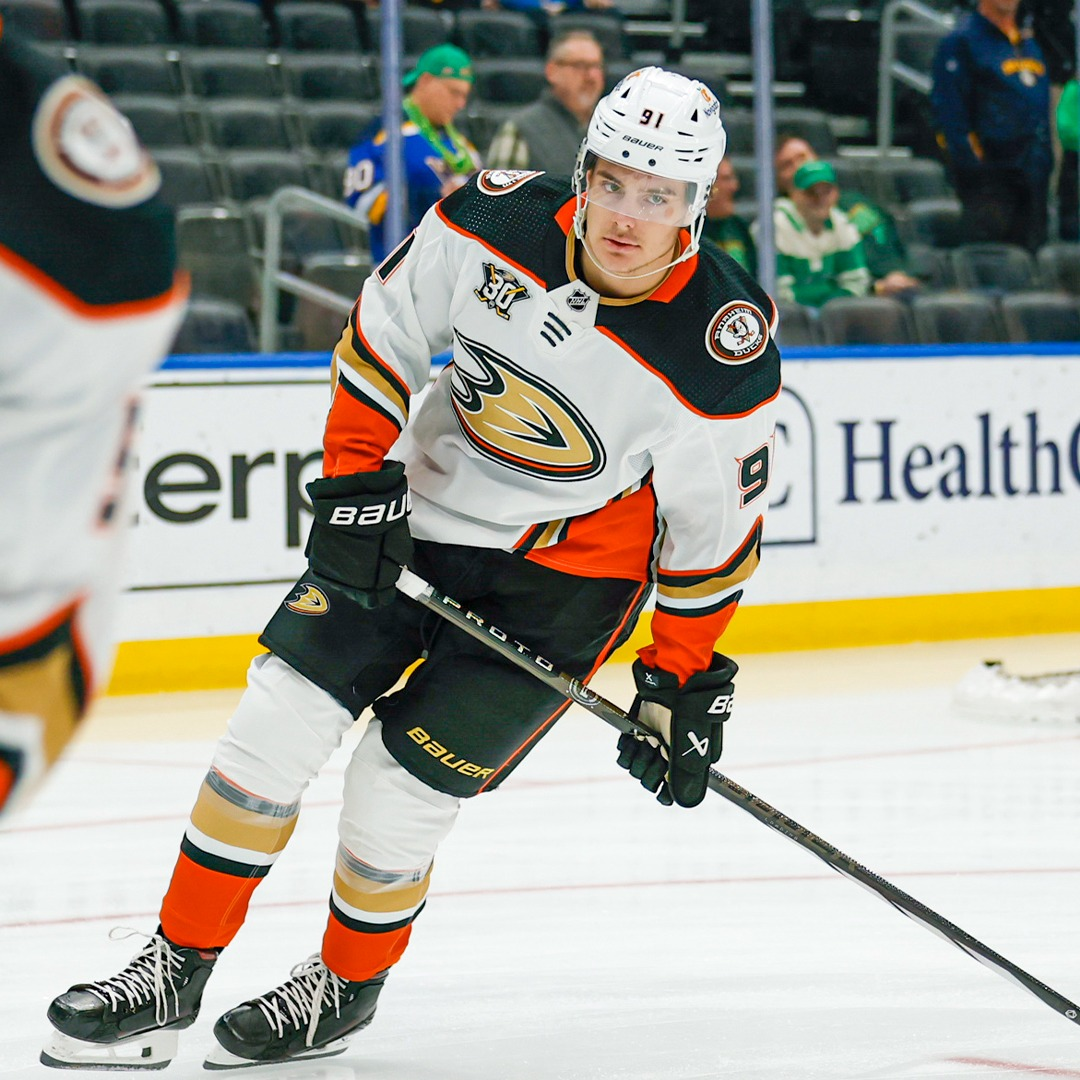
- Carlsson in 2024
- Born: 26 December 2004 (age 21) Karlstad, Sweden
- Height: 6 ft 3 in (191 cm)
- Weight: 194 lb (88 kg; 13 st 12 lb)
- Position: Centre
- Shoots: Left
- NHL team Former teams: Anaheim Ducks; Örebro HK
- National team: Sweden
- NHL draft: 2nd overall, 2023; Anaheim Ducks
- Playing career: 2021–present

Leif Leo Olof Carlsson (born 26 December 2004) is a Swedish professional ice hockey player who is a centre and alternate captain for the Anaheim Ducks of the National Hockey League (NHL). He was drafted second overall by the Ducks in the 2023 NHL entry draft.

== Playing career ==
Carlsson originally played at the youth level with hometown team Färjestad BK before moving to fellow tenured Swedish Hockey League (SHL) team, Örebro HK, for the 2020–21 season. During the 2021–22 season, Carlsson made his professional debut in the SHL as a 17-year-old, posting three goals and six assists in 35 regular-season games.

In his year of NHL entry draft eligibility, Carlsson increased his stock in playing exclusively with the senior team in the SHL showing an offensive acumen in securing a scoring line role among Örebro HK for the 2022–23 season. Bob McKenzie referred to Carlsson as a "blue-chip" prospect in the 2023 NHL entry draft.

On 28 June 2023, Carlsson was drafted second overall by the Anaheim Ducks in the 2023 draft. He signed a three-year, entry-level contract with the Ducks on 12 July. On 10 October, Carlsson was named to the Ducks' opening night roster for the 2023–24 season after attending the team's training camp. However, he suffered an injury during practice on 6 October, and was unable to play in the Ducks' first two games of the season. Carlsson made his NHL debut on 19 October, scoring a goal in the Ducks' 3–2 loss against the Dallas Stars. On 10 November, in a 6–3 loss to the Philadelphia Flyers, Carlsson became the youngest player in Ducks franchise history to record a hat-trick, at 18 years and 319 days old. During a game against the Boston Bruins on 22 February 2025, Carlsson tallied his 49th career point to tie Hampus Lindholm for the fourth-most points by a Ducks player before age 21.

Entering the 2026 off-season as a restricted free agent, the Philadelphia Flyers submitted an offer sheet to Carlsson, offering a five-year, $90 million contract on 3 July 2026, making Carlsson the highest-paid player in the NHL with an annual value of $18 million. On 9 July, Anaheim matched the offer sheet.

== International play ==
Medal record

Men's ice hockey

Representing Sweden

World Championships
Bronze medal – third place	2025 Sweden/Denmark	

Carlsson represented Sweden junior team at the 2023 World Junior Championships. In May 2023, it was announced that Carlsson would play for Sweden senior team in the 2023 World Championship. Carlsson was selected to play for the 2026 Swedish Olympic team, and was expected to play as their first line centre, but a Morel-Lavallée lesion (separation of skin and fat from fascia tissue) on his left thigh caused him to miss the tournament.

== Career statistics ==
=== Regular season and playoffs ===
			Regular season					Playoffs
Season	Team	League	GP	G	A	Pts	PIM	GP	G	A	Pts	PIM
2020–21	Örebro HK	J20	19	4	5	9	12	—	—	—	—	—
2021–22	Örebro HK	J20	14	10	17	27	2	4	1	7	8	2
2021–22	Örebro HK	SHL	35	3	6	9	4	—	—	—	—	—
2022–23	Örebro HK	SHL	44	10	15	25	6	13	1	8	9	4
2023–24	Anaheim Ducks	NHL	55	12	17	29	16	—	—	—	—	—
2024–25	Anaheim Ducks	NHL	76	20	25	45	14	—	—	—	—	—
2025–26	Anaheim Ducks	NHL	70	29	38	67	33	12	4	7	11	0
SHL totals			79	13	21	34	10	13	1	8	9	4
NHL totals			201	61	80	141	63	12	4	7	11	0

=== International ===
Year	Team	Event	Result	GP	G	A	Pts	PIM
2021	Sweden	HG18	3rd place, bronze medalist(s)	5	1	2	3	0
2022	Sweden	U18	1st place, gold medalist(s)	2	2	1	3	0
2023	Sweden	WJC	4th	7	3	3	6	2
2023	Sweden	WC	6th	8	3	2	5	0
2025	Sweden	4NF	3rd	1	0	0	0	0
2025	Sweden	WC	6th	10	4	6	10	2
Junior totals				14	6	6	12	2
Senior totals				10	7	8	15	2

Awards and achievements
Preceded by Nathan Gaucher	Anaheim Ducks first-round draft pick 2023	Succeeded by Beckett Sennecke
