= Mark Mitera =

American ice hockey player (born 1987)

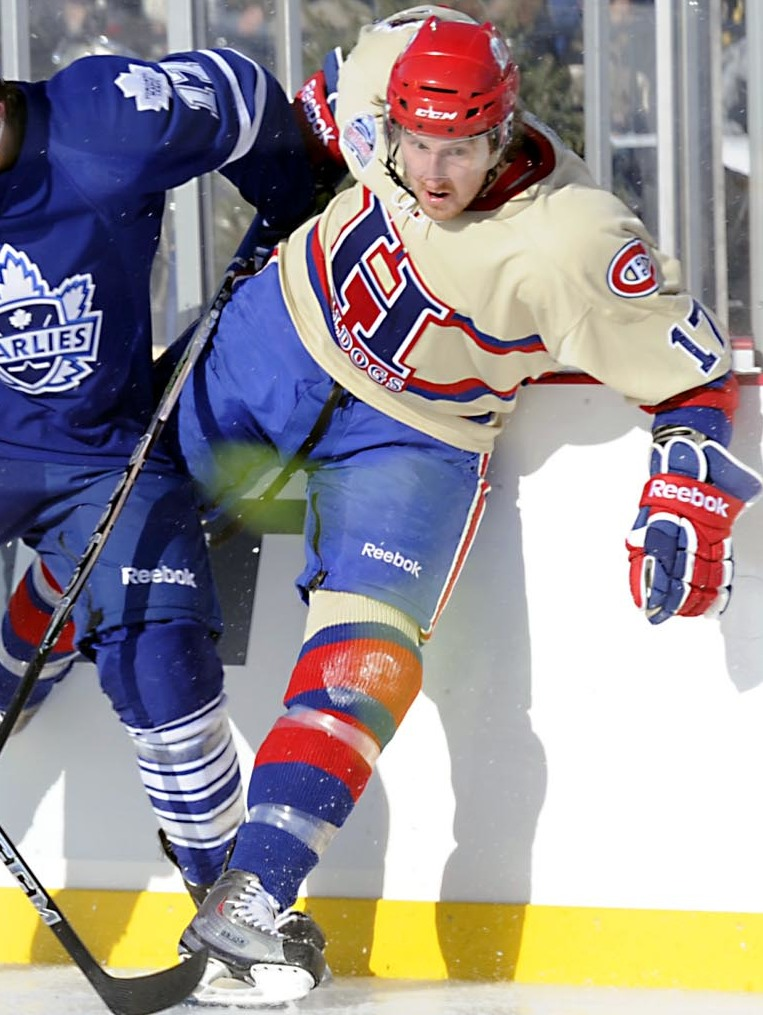
- Mitera with the Hamilton Bulldogs in 2012
- Born: October 22, 1987 (age 38) Royal Oak, MI, United States
- Height: 6 ft 3 in (191 cm)
- Weight: 215 lb (98 kg; 15 st 5 lb)
- Position: Defense
- Shot: Left
- Played for: Iowa Chops; San Antonio Rampage; Abbotsford Heat; Syracuse Crunch; Hamilton Bulldogs; Grand Rapids Griffins
- NHL draft: 19th overall, 2006; Anaheim Ducks
- Playing career: 2009–2013

Mark Mitera (born October 22, 1987) is an American former professional ice hockey player. Mitera was drafted by the Anaheim Ducks in the first round, 19th overall, in the 2006 NHL Entry Draft. He last played for the Reading Royals of the ECHL in 2012–13.

== Playing career ==
Mitera joined the University of Michigan for the 2005-06 season after playing two seasons with the U.S. National Team Development Program.

During his final season with Michigan, Mitera tore his ACL and underwent successful surgery. He returned to the Wolverines lineup and finished the season with one goal and two assists in eight games. After four seasons with the Michigan Wolverines men's ice hockey team in the Central Collegiate Hockey Association (CCHA), Mitera signed a three-year, entry-level contract with the Ducks on March 30, 2009.

On July 15, 2011, Mitera was traded by the Ducks to the Montreal Canadiens for Mathieu Carle. On January 10, 2013, Mitera signed for the remainder of the 2012–13 season with the Reading Royals of the ECHL.

== Career statistics ==
=== Regular season and playoffs ===
			Regular season					Playoffs
Season	Team	League	GP	G	A	Pts	PIM	GP	G	A	Pts	PIM
2003–04	U.S. NTDP U18	NAHL	42	2	13	15	69	—	—	—	—	—
2004–05	U.S. NTDP U18	NAHL	16	2	6	8	32	—	—	—	—	—
2005–06	University of Michigan	CCHA	39	0	10	10	59	—	—	—	—	—
2006–07	University of Michigan	CCHA	41	1	17	18	52	—	—	—	—	—
2007–08	University of Michigan	CCHA	43	2	21	23	60	—	—	—	—	—
2008–09	University of Michigan	CCHA	8	1	2	3	4	—	—	—	—	—
2008–09	Iowa Chops	AHL	5	0	2	2	2	—	—	—	—	—
2009–10	San Antonio Rampage	AHL	5	0	0	0	6	—	—	—	—	—
2009–10	Bakersfield Condors	ECHL	36	3	11	14	62	—	—	—	—	—
2009–10	Abbotsford Heat	AHL	27	0	3	3	12	13	0	2	2	9
2010–11	Syracuse Crunch	AHL	71	6	16	22	50	—	—	—	—	—
2011–12	Hamilton Bulldogs	AHL	75	3	10	13	48	—	—	—	—	—
2012–13	Grand Rapids Griffins	AHL	2	0	0	0	0	—	—	—	—	—
2012–13	Reading Royals	ECHL	35	2	14	16	18	19	2	10	12	4
AHL totals			185	9	31	40	118	13	0	2	2	9

=== International ===
Year	Team	Event	GP	G	A	Pts	PIM
2004	United States	U17	6	1	2	3	8
2005	United States	WJC18	6	0	0	0	8
2006	United States	WJC	7	0	0	0	27
Junior totals			19	1	2	3	43

== Awards and honors ==
Award	Year
College
All-CCHA Second Team	2007–08
CCHA All-Tournament Team	2008

Awards and achievements
Preceded by Bobby Ryan	Anaheim Ducks first-round draft pick 2006	Succeeded by Logan MacMillan
