= Roger McQueen =

Canadian ice hockey player (born 2006)

- Born: October 2, 2006 (age 20) Saskatoon, Saskatchewan, Canada
- Height: 6 ft 5 in (196 cm)
- Weight: 197 lb (89 kg; 14 st 1 lb)
- Position: Centre
- Shoots: Right
- NHL team: Anaheim Ducks
- NHL draft: 10th overall, 2025; Anaheim Ducks
- Playing career: 2026–present

Roger McQueen (born October 2, 2006) is a Canadian professional ice hockey player who is a centre for the Anaheim Ducks of the National Hockey League (NHL). He played college ice hockey at Providence College. He was drafted tenth overall by the Ducks in the 2025 NHL entry draft.

== Playing career ==
During the 2022–23 season, in his rookie season with the Brandon Wheat Kings, McQueen recorded four goals and ten assists in 55 regular season games. During the 2023–24 season, McQueen recorded 21 goals and 30 assists in 53 regular season games. He missed the final month of the regular season due to a back injury and returned for the playoffs, where he led the team in scoring and recorded four goals and one assist in four playoff games.

McQueen began the 2024–25 season with a four-goal season debut against the Moose Jaw Warriors. He recorded 11 points through the first eight games of the season before suffering an injury against the Medicine Hat Tigers on October 11, 2024.

On June 27, 2025, McQueen was drafted in the first round, tenth overall, by the Anaheim Ducks in the 2025 NHL entry draft. When drafted by the Ducks, he chose to wear the number 95 as a reference to the Cars character, Lightning McQueen. On August 6, 2025, he committed to play college ice hockey for Providence College during the 2025–26 season. During his freshman year he recorded 11 goals and 16 assists in 36 games. He ranked second on the team in scoring with 27 points. Following the season he was named the Hockey East Rookie of the Year, becoming the fourth Friar overall to win the league's Rookie of the Year award, and the first since 2013.

Upon the conclusion of his college season, McQueen signed an amateur tryout (ATO) contract with the San Diego Gulls of the American Hockey League (AHL) on April 1, 2026. He made his professional debut for the Gulls on April 3, against the Bakersfield Condors. The following week, he scored his first professional goal against Condors goaltender, Calvin Pickard. On April 18, he signed a three-year, entry-level contract with the Ducks. McQueen scored his first NHL goal and first with the Ducks on October 29, 2026, against the Buffalo Sabres.

== International play ==
Medal record

Representing Canada

Ice hockey

World U18 Championships
Gold medal – first place	2024 Finland	

On July 12, 2023, McQueen was selected to represent Canada at the 2023 Hlinka Gretzky Cup. During the tournament he recorded four goals and three assists in five games and won a gold medal.

On April 16, 2024, McQueen was selected to represent Canada at the 2024 IIHF World U18 Championships. During the tournament he recorded one assist in two games and won a gold medal, before missing the remainder of the tournament due to injury.

== Career statistics ==
=== Regular season and playoffs ===
			Regular season					Playoffs
Season	Team	League	GP	G	A	Pts	PIM	GP	G	A	Pts	PIM
2021–22	Brandon Wheat Kings	WHL	2	0	1	1	0	—	—	—	—	—
2022–23	Brandon Wheat Kings	WHL	55	4	10	14	26	—	—	—	—	—
2023–24	Brandon Wheat Kings	WHL	53	21	30	51	50	4	4	1	5	8
2024–25	Brandon Wheat Kings	WHL	17	10	10	20	40	3	1	0	1	6
2025–26	Providence College	HE	36	11	16	27	45	—	—	—	—	—
2025–26	San Diego Gulls	AHL	7	1	2	3	6	2	0	0	0	12
WHL totals			127	35	51	86	116	7	5	1	6	14

=== International ===
Year	Team	Event	Result	GP	G	A	Pts	PIM
2022	Canada White	U17	6th	6	4	4	8	6
2023	Canada	HG18	1st place, gold medalist(s)	5	4	3	7	6
2024	Canada	U18	1st place, gold medalist(s)	2	0	1	1	29
Junior totals				13	8	8	16	41

== Awards and honors ==
Award	Year	Ref
College
Hockey East All-Rookie Team	2026	
Hockey East Rookie of the Year	2026	

Awards and achievements
Preceded by Stian Solberg	Anaheim Ducks first-round draft pick 2025	Succeeded by Nikita Klepov
Preceded by Cole Hutson	Hockey East Rookie of the Year; 2025–26	Succeeded by Incumbent
