= Robert Nordmark =

Swedish ice hockey player and coach

- Born: 20 August 1962 (age 63) Överkalix, Sweden
- Height: 6 ft 1 in (185 cm)
- Weight: 220 lb (100 kg; 15 st 10 lb)
- Position: Defence
- Shot: Right
- Played for: St. Louis Blues; Vancouver Canucks; VIK Västerås HK; Djurgårdens IF
- National team: Sweden
- NHL draft: 191st overall, 1981; Detroit Red Wings; 59th overall, 1987; St. Louis Blues
- Playing career: 1987–1991

Robert Ingemar Nordmark (born 20 August 1962) is a Swedish former professional ice hockey player. He was the head coach for Almtuna IS in Allsvenskan (the Swedish second division) in the 2007–08 season, but he was replaced by Leif Boork in November 2007 because of poor results. He is a European scout of the Toronto Maple Leafs.

== Playing career ==
Nordmark was drafted 191st overall in the 1981 NHL entry draft by the Detroit Red Wings, after helping Sweden to their first gold medal at the World Junior Championships in 1981. Despite solid performances in the Swedish Elite League in ensuing years, Nordmark was never signed by the Red Wings and his draft rights lapsed in 1984. After strong performances at the 1986 and 1987 World Championships, Nordmark was re-drafted 59th overall in the 1987 NHL entry draft by the St. Louis Blues.

In 1987–88, Nordmark stepped into the Blues' lineup, registering 3 goals and 18 assists for 21 points in 67 games. Following the season, however, he was dealt to the Vancouver Canucks with a draft pick for Dave Richter. In 1988–89 with the Canucks, he would have a career year, registering 6 goals and 35 assists for 41 points while forming an effective combination on the powerplay with Paul Reinhart. He added to the playoffs, with 3 goals and 5 points in 7 games.

Nordmark was unable to duplicate his success of 1988–89. In 1989–90, he slumped to just 2 goals and 13 points in 44 games, while his defensive play became erratic and he became a target for boo-birds at Canuck home games, including being jeered after assisting on an overtime winning goal. The 1990–91 season was another disappointment, as he finished with just 8 points in 45 games, and following the year he was released by the Canucks and allowed to return to Sweden.

Nordmark returned to form in the Elitserien and was a top defender in that league for several more seasons with VIK Västerås HK and Djurgårdens IF, earning another invitation to the World Championships in 1995. He had one of the best seasons of his career in 1995–96, scoring 16 goals and 29 points for Lukko Rauma of the Finnish SM-liiga. He had further stints in Switzerland, Austria, and Britain before retiring in 2001 and moving into coaching. In 2003–04, while coaching Djurgården, came out of retirement in an injury crisis and scored 7 points in 14 games at the age of 41.

Nordmark finished his NHL career with totals of 13 goals and 70 assists for 83 points in 236 games, along with 254 penalty minutes.

== Personal ==
Nordmark is a cousin of former athlete Kenth Eldebrink and former ice hockey defenceman Anders Eldebrink. He is the father of NHL prospect Marcus Nordmark.

== Career statistics ==
Robert Nordmark
Medal record

Representing Sweden

Men's ice hockey

World Championships
Silver medal – second place	1995 Stockholm	
Gold medal – first place	1987 Vienna	
Silver medal – second place	1986 Moscow	

World Junior Championships
Gold medal – first place	1981 Füssen	

European Junior Championships
Bronze medal – third place	1980 Hradec Králové	

=== Regular season and playoffs ===
			Regular season					Playoffs
Season	Team	League	GP	G	A	Pts	PIM	GP	G	A	Pts	PIM
1979–80	Luleå HF	Div. 1	24	4	2	6	16	8	0	0	0	4
1980–81	Frölunda HC	SEL	34	4	3	7	30	2	0	0	0	0
1981–82	Brynäs IF	SEL	34	5	5	10	16	—	—	—	—	—
1982–83	Brynäs IF	SEL	36	8	5	13	32	—	—	—	—	—
1983–84	Brynäs IF	SEL	32	10	15	25	44	—	—	—	—	—
1984–85	Luleå HF	SEL	33	3	9	12	30	—	—	—	—	—
1985–86	Luleå HF	SEL	35	9	15	24	48	—	—	—	—	—
1986–87	Luleå HF	SEL	32	7	8	15	46	3	0	3	3	4
1987–88	St. Louis Blues	NHL	67	3	18	21	60	—	—	—	—	—
1988–89	Vancouver Canucks	NHL	80	6	35	41	97	7	3	2	5	4
1989–90	Vancouver Canucks	NHL	44	2	11	13	34	—	—	—	—	—
1990–91	Vancouver Canucks	NHL	45	2	6	8	63	—	—	—	—	—
1991–92	VIK Västerås HK	SEL	36	11	6	17	70	—	—	—	—	—
1992–93	VIK Västerås HK	SEL	24	11	5	16	52	3	1	0	1	10
1993–94	Djurgårdens IF	SEL	35	5	5	10	62	6	0	0	0	6
1994–95	Djurgårdens IF	SEL	34	7	11	18	50	3	1	0	1	2
1995–96	Lukko	SM-l	43	16	13	29	58	8	2	4	6	6
1996–97	ZSC Lions	NLA	41	9	17	26	59	—	—	—	—	—
1997–98	Djurgårdens IF	SEL	11	3	5	8	10	6	0	0	0	4
1998–99	VEU Feldkirch	ALP	15	7	3	10	2	—	—	—	—	—
1998–99	Klagenfurt AC	ALP	4	1	3	4	2	—	—	—	—	—
1998–99	Klagenfurt AC	EBEL	22	2	9	11	20	—	—	—	—	—
1999–00	Hammarby IF	Allsv	37	7	10	17	24	2	1	0	1	0
2000–01	Nottingham Panthers	BISL	29	4	6	10	16	6	1	1	2	4
2003–04	Djurgårdens IF	SEL	14	3	4	7	10	1	0	0	0	2
2004–05	Enköpings SK	Div. 2	5	0	2	2	2	7	1	4	5	6
NHL totals			236	13	70	83	254	7	3	2	5	4
SEL totals			390	86	96	182	500	24	2	3	5	28

=== International ===
Year	Team	Event	GP	G	A	Pts	PIM
1980	Sweden Jr.	EJC	5	1	1	2	6
1981	Sweden Jr.	WJC	5	0	0	0	2
1982	Sweden Jr.	WJC	7	2	1	3	0
1986	Sweden	WC	8	3	2	5	10
1987	Sweden	WC	9	1	2	3	16
1995	Sweden	WC	8	1	1	2	4
Senior int'l totals			62	—	—	—	—
