= Bookie (disambiguation) =

Bookie, short for bookmaker, is a person or organization that takes bets on at agreed-upon odds.

Bookie or Bookies may also refer to:

== People ==
- Bookie Bolin (born 1940), American football player
- Mike Bookie (1904–1944), American soccer player
- Dave Bookman (1960–2019), Canadian radio personality
- Kid Bookie (born 1992), British rapper

== Arts, entertainment, and media ==
- Bookies (film), a German thriller directed by Mark Illsley
- Bookie (TV series), an American comedy created by Chuck Lorre

== See also ==
- Book (disambiguation)
- Bookmaker (disambiguation)
