= Bookmaker (disambiguation) =

A bookmaker (often abbreviated "bookie") is a person or organization that calculates odds and accepts and pays off bets.

Bookmaker may also refer to:

- Printer (publishing)

== See also ==
- Book (disambiguation)
- Bookbinder, someone who physically assembles a book from an ordered stack of paper sheets
- Bookie (disambiguation)
- Editor, of books
- Publisher
