= Music book =

Music book may refer to:

- Sheet music, written or printed musical notation
- Song book, a book of song lyrics
- Musical book, the libretto or script of a musical play
- Choirbook, a large manuscript used by choirs during the Middle Ages and Renaissance

== See also ==
- Book music
- Book (disambiguation)
- Music (disambiguation)
- Category:Books about music
