= Joshua Ravensbergen =

Canadian ice hockey player (born 2006)

- Born: November 27, 2006 (age 19) North Vancouver, British Columbia, Canada
- Height: 6 ft 5 in (196 cm)
- Weight: 190 lb (86 kg; 13 st 8 lb)
- Position: Goaltender
- Catches: Right
- NCAA team: Michigan State University
- NHL draft: 30th overall, 2025; San Jose Sharks

Joshua Ravensbergen (born November 27, 2006) is a Canadian college ice hockey goaltender for Michigan State University of the National Collegiate Athletic Association (NCAA) as a prospect to the San Jose Sharks of the National Hockey League (NHL). Ravensbergen was drafted 30th overall by the San Jose Sharks in the 2025 NHL entry draft.

Born and raised in North Vancouver, British Columbia, Ravensbergen played with Vancouver Northwest Hawks before entering the Western Hockey League (WHL) in 2023 undrafted. Ravensbergen quickly made a name for himself with the Prince George Cougars, receiving four WHL awards in three months in his rookie season, being named to the WHL Second All-Star team at the end of the season. He took over as the Prince George Cougars' starting goaltender position for the next three seasons, receiving another spot on the WHL Second All-Star team in 2025, and being named WHL Goaltender of the year and earning a spot on the First All-Star team in 2026. Following the 2025–26 season, he joined the Michigan State Spartans in the NCAA.

== Playing career ==
Ravensbergen played youth hockey for the Vancouver Northwest Hawks of the BC Elite Hockey League (BCEHL) from 2020 to 2023. After helping the U-17 Hawks win the BCEHL championship for the 2021–22 season, he attended the Prince George Cougars training camp but was not signed, returning to the Vancouver Northwest Hawks for the 2022–23 BCEHL season. After recording a 15–2–3 record, a 2.10 goals against average (GAA) and two shutouts for the U-18 Hawks, the Cougars signed Ravensbergen as an undrafted free agent to a WHL Scholarship and Development Agreement.

In his first season with the Prince George Cougars, he was expected to be the backup goaltender to Vancouver Canucks prospect Ty Young, but took over starting goaltender after a hot start, being named as the WHL Goaltender of the Week for the weeks of October 30, November 6, and December 4. He was also named WHL Goaltender of the Month for November. Up to December 4, he had recorded a .944 save percentage, a 1.63 GAA, and five shutouts, leading the Cougars to rank second in goals allowed per game at 2.64. With five shutouts, he rivaled the Cougars' rookie record for most shutouts in a single season, set at six by Scott Bowles in the 2005–06 season. In April 2024, he was named the WHL Rookie of the Month after a 6–2–0–0 record with three shutouts in that stretch. He ended the regular season with a 2.46 GAA, a .907 save percentage, and six shutouts, tying the rookie record. He was also named to the WHL B.C. Division second all-star team. Throughout the season, he received 2025 NHL entry draft coverage for potentially being the "next big goaltending prospect". The Cougars entered the 2024 WHL playoffs as the W1 seed against the W5 seed Kelowna Rockets, who they defeated in five with Ravensbergen recording back-to-back shutouts in game one and two of the series. They advanced to the conference finals against the W2-seeded Portland Winterhawks, a series that they would lose in six. In the playoffs, he recorded a .931 save percentage and a 1.98 GAA.

Over the summer, Ravensbergen was invited to the Hockey Canada National Junior Team Summer Showcase, along with 41 other players as a part of a training camp exhibition series hybrid. Fellow North Vancouverite Macklin Celebrini was also invited but did not attend the showcase. He entered the 2024–25 season being selected to the roster for the 2024 CHL USA Prospects Challenge, a two-game series between 2025 NHL eligible prospects and the USA Hockey National Team Development Program. By that point, he had already recorded a 6–1–2–1 record. In the first preliminary rankings put out by the NHL Central Scouting Bureau, Ravensbergen was given an A, while teammates Jett Lajoie and Aiden Foster were both given a C. He was later ranked as the top North American goaltender in the NHL Central Scouting Bureau's midterm rankings. In his second season with the Cougars, he recorded a 33–13–3–1 record with a 3.01 goals against average and a .901 save percentage, receiving a spot on the WHL Western Conference second all-star team for the second year in a row along with teammate Viliam Kmec. The Cougars entered the 2025 WHL playoffs as the fourth seed, paired against the fifth-seed Winterhawks, a series they lost in seven. Following the playoffs, he received the Cougars' Dan Hamhuis Most Valuable Player Award. Further analysis of Ravensbergen's game happened as a part of the 2025 NHL entry draft coverage, with his size being "desirable" at 6-foot-6, but his athleticism "[left] much to be desired". He was selected in the first round by the San Jose Sharks in the 2025 NHL entry draft with the 30th overall pick, marking their second selection in the first round following the selection of Michael Misa at 2nd overall.

Ravensbergen started the 2025–26 season at the San Jose Sharks' rookie showcase camp with the opportunity to advance to main camp. He did not make the cut for the main camp, and ended up back with the Cougars for his third season. While in rumours for being a potential prospect to receive an invitation to the 2026 World Juniors camp for Canada, he started off the WHL season winning the Goaltender of the Month for November, posting a 2.00 GAA, .940 save percentage, and one shutout. He was named to Canada's training camp roster on December 8. On January 26, 2026, it was announced that he committed to Michigan State to play college ice hockey. He ended the regular season with a 2.51 GAA, and a .919 save percentage, ranking top five in GAA among all WHL goaltenders. The Cougars entered the 2026 playoffs as the third seed against the sixth-seed Spokane Chiefs, a series they won in six. They advanced to the conference semifinals against the second-seed Penticton Vees, a series they lost in six. He recorded a .918 save percentage and a 2.71 GAA in 12 playoff games. Following the end of the season, he received the Del Wilson Trophy as the WHL's goaltender of the year and a spot on the WHL Western Conference's first all-star team along with teammate Carson Carels.

== International play ==
Medal record

Men's ice hockey

Representing Canada

World Junior Championships
Bronze medal – third place	2026 United States	

On December 8, 2025, he was selected to represent Canada at the 2026 World Junior Ice Hockey Championships. As the third-string goaltender on the team's depth chart, behind Jack Ivankovic and Carter George, he did not play in the World Junior Ice Hockey Championships, playing only one pre-tournament game against Denmark on December 23. He was listed as the backup goaltender on December 27 and January 5 against Latvia and Finland respectively; the latter game being won 6–3 to give Canada the bronze medal.

== Personal life ==
On February 27, 2019, Ravensbergen and the group of friends he was with helped catch an eight-year-old boy who slipped from his ski lift chair while on the slopes of Grouse Mountain. The teens were given Civic Recognition Awards by the District of North Vancouver council and later honored by then–Governor General of Canada Julie Payette for their efforts.

== Career statistics ==
			Regular season									Playoffs
Season	Team	League	GP	W	L	OTL	MIN	GA	SO	GAA	SV%	GP	W	L	MIN	GA	SO	GAA	SV%
2023–24	Prince George Cougars	WHL	38	26	4	2	2,072	85	6	2.46	.907	12	9	3	696	23	3	1.98	.931
2024–25	Prince George Cougars	WHL	51	33	13	4	2,964	148	0	3.00	.901	7	2	4	417	25	0	3.60	.896
2025–26	Prince George Cougars	WHL	46	32	13	0	2,680	112	4	2.51	.919	12	6	6	731	33	0	2.71	.918
WHL totals			135	91	30	6	7,716	345	10	2.68	.909	31	17	13	1,844	81	3	2.64	.917

== Awards and honours ==
Honours	Year	Ref
WHL
Del Wilson Trophy	2025–26	
First All-Star Team	2025–26	
Second All-Star Team	2023–24, 2024–25	

Awards and achievements
Preceded by Michael Misa	San Jose Sharks first-round draft pick 2025	Succeeded by Ivar Stenberg
