= 2025–26 WHL season =

- League: Western Hockey League
- Sport: Ice hockey
- Duration: Regular season September 19, 2025 – March 22, 2026; Playoffs March 27, 2026 – May 15, 2026
- Teams: 23
- TV partner(s): KRCW-TV, KZJO, CBC, TSN, RDS, Victory+

Regular season
- Scotty Munro Memorial Trophy: Everett Silvertips (3)
- Season MVP: Bryce Pickford (Medicine Hat Tigers)
- Top scorer: Markus Ruck (Medicine Hat Tigers)

Playoffs
- Playoffs MVP: Julius Miettinen (Silvertips)
- Finals champions: Everett Silvertips (1)
- Runners-up: Prince Albert Raiders

Seasons
- 2024–25 2026–27

2025–26 CHL seasons
- League: Canadian Hockey League
- Sport: Ice hockey
- Duration: OHL September 2025–May 2026; QMJHL September 2025–May 2026; WHL September 2025–May 2026
- Teams: 61
- TV partner(s): CBC Television/Gem, TSN, RDS, Rogers TV
- Season MVP: Maxim Massé (Chicoutimi Saguenéens)
- Top scorer: Markus Ruck (Medicine Hat Tigers) (WHL)

Memorial Cup
- Finals champions: Kitchener Rangers (OHL) (3rd title)
- Runners-up: Everett Silvertips (WHL)

The 2025–26 WHL season was the 60th season of the Western Hockey League (WHL). The regular season began on September 19, 2025. The Penticton Vees joined as the league's newest franchise, its 23rd, and were placed in the B.C. division of the Western Conference.

The Everett Silvertips won the Ed Chynoweth Cup, their first WHL championship, and will represent the WHL at the 2026 Memorial Cup, hosted by the Kelowna Rockets of the WHL. The tournament was held at Prospera Place in Kelowna, British Columbia. The tournament concluded on May 31, with the host Rockets eliminated after being win-less in the round-robin, and the WHL champion Silvertips falling to the Ontario Hockey League champion Kitchener Rangers in the tournament final.

== Conference standings ==
Western Conference
Pos	Div	Team	Pld	W	L	OTL	SOL	GF	GA	Pts	PCT
1	U.S.	x, y, z – Everett Silvertips	68	57	8	2	1	304	173	117	.860
2	B.C.	x, y – Penticton Vees	68	44	14	6	4	268	188	98	.721
3	B.C.	x – Prince George Cougars	68	44	22	2	0	245	188	90	.662
4	B.C.	x – Kelowna Rockets	68	38	21	6	3	259	220	85	.625
5	B.C.	x – Kamloops Blazers	68	31	24	7	6	264	250	75	.551
6	U.S.	x – Spokane Chiefs	68	36	30	2	0	223	209	74	.544
7	U.S.	x – Seattle Thunderbirds	68	31	27	6	4	223	241	72	.529
8	U.S.	x – Portland Winterhawks	68	30	30	7	1	235	264	68	.500
9	B.C.	e – Victoria Royals	68	28	30	6	4	209	253	66	.485
10	U.S.	e – Tri-City Americans	68	26	36	5	1	181	252	58	.426
11	U.S.	e – Wenatchee Wild	68	25	38	3	2	190	242	55	.404
12	B.C.	e – Vancouver Giants	68	25	39	2	2	196	282	54	.397

Source: "2025-26 Regular Season Conference Standings". CHL.ca.
e – eliminated from playoff contention; x – clinched playoff; y – clinched division; z – best regular season record

Eastern Conference
Pos	Div	Team	Pld	W	L	OTL	SOL	GF	GA	Pts	PCT
1	East	x, y – Prince Albert Raiders	68	52	10	5	1	310	165	110	.809
2	Central	x, y – Medicine Hat Tigers	68	50	10	5	3	348	208	108	.794
3	Central	x – Edmonton Oil Kings	68	45	18	3	2	287	205	95	.699
4	Central	x – Calgary Hitmen	68	38	21	8	1	248	221	85	.625
5	East	x – Brandon Wheat Kings	68	40	26	2	0	269	241	82	.603
6	East	x – Saskatoon Blades	68	34	27	5	2	220	224	75	.551
7	East	x – Regina Pats	68	25	34	7	2	234	289	59	.434
8	Central	x – Red Deer Rebels	68	26	36	4	2	198	266	58	.426
9	East	e – Moose Jaw Warriors	68	25	36	5	2	234	296	57	.419
10	East	e – Swift Current Broncos	68	15	44	4	5	179	326	39	.287
11	Central	e – Lethbridge Hurricanes	68	17	47	3	1	198	319	38	.279

Source: "2025-26 Regular Season Conference Standings". CHL.ca.
e – eliminated from playoff contention; x – clinched playoff; y – clinched division

== Statistical leaders ==
=== Scoring leaders ===
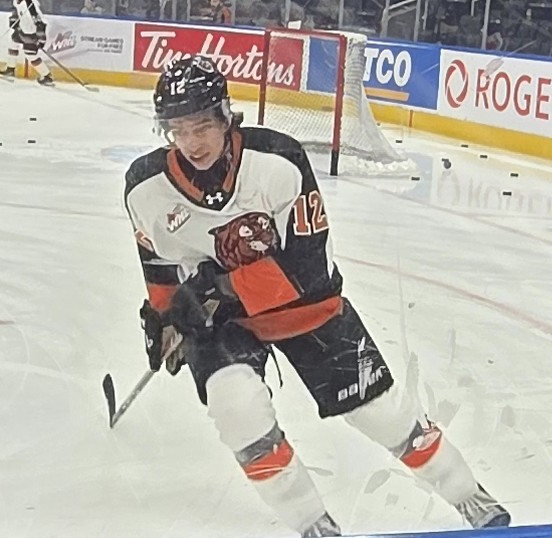
Liam Ruck finished second in league scoring, behind his twin brother Markus.

These are the top ten skaters based on points. If there is a tie in points, goals take precedence over assists; if there is a tie in goals, players with fewer games played take precedence over those with more. Updated following games played on March 22, 2026.

Note: GP = Games played; G = Goals; A = Assists; Pts. = Points; PIM = Penalty minutes

Player	Team	GP	G	A	Pts	PIM
Markus Ruck	Medicine Hat Tigers	68	21	87	108	28
Liam Ruck	Medicine Hat Tigers	68	45	59	104	36
Cameron Schmidt	Vancouver/Seattle	72	51	49	100	58
JP Hurlbert	Kamloops Blazers	68	42	55	97	45
Alex Weiermair	Portland Winterhawks	66	37	56	93	28
Tij Iginla	Kelowna Rockets	48	41	49	90	29
Luke Mistelbacher	Brandon Wheat Kings	67	42	46	88	33
Lukas Sawchyn	Edmonton Oil Kings	68	27	61	88	42
Matias Vanhanen	Everett Silvertips	62	21	66	87	6
Nathan Behm	Kamloops Blazers	67	38	48	86	41

=== Leading goaltenders ===
These are the top five goaltenders is a combined table of the top five goaltenders based on goals against average who have played more than 40% of their team's total minutes. Updated following games played on March 21, 2026.

Note: GP = Games played; Mins = Minutes played; GA = Goals against; W = Wins; L = Losses; OTL = Overtime losses; SOL = Shootout losses; SO = Shutouts; GAA = Goals against average; Sv% = Save percentage

Player	Team	GP	Mins	W	L	OTL	SOL	GA	SO	GAA	Sv%
Michal Oršulák	Prince Albert Raiders	36	2,139	28	4	3	1	79	4	2.22	.907
Anders Miller	Calgary/Everett	36	2,086	31	5	0	0	80	4	2.30	.914
A.J. Reyelts	Penticton Vees	43	2,520	29	6	6	2	103	3	2.45	.906
Joshua Ravensbergen	Prince George Cougars	46	2,680	32	13	0	0	112	4	2.51	.919
Ethan McCallum	Saskatoon/Penticton	34	1,781	18	10	0	1	78	4	2.63	.907

== 2026 WHL playoffs ==
Conference quarterfinals	Conference semifinals
E1	Prince Albert	4
E8	Red Deer	1
E1	Prince Albert	4
E6	Saskatoon	0
E2	Medicine Hat	4
E7	Regina	1
Eastern
E3	Edmonton	3
E6	Saskatoon	4
E2	Medicine Hat	4
E4	Calgary	0
E4	Calgary	4
E5	Brandon	0
Note: Pairings are re-seeded after the first round.
W1	Everett	4
W8	Portland	0
W1	Everett	4
W4	Kelowna	1
W2	Penticton	4
W7	Seattle	1
Western
W3	Prince George	4
W6	Spokane	2
W2	Penticton	4
W3	Prince George	2
W4	Kelowna	4
W5	Kamloops	0

Conference finals
E1	Prince Albert	4
E2	Medicine Hat	2
W1	Everett	4
W2	Penticton	0

WHL championship
E1	Prince Albert	1
W1	Everett	4

== Conference quarterfinals ==
=== Eastern Conference ===
==== (1) Prince Albert Raiders vs. (8) Red Deer Rebels ====
March 27	Red Deer Rebels	1–4	Prince Albert Raiders	Art Hauser Centre	Recap
No scoring		First period	14:43 - pp - Braeden Cootes (1)
No scoring		Second period	2:03 - Daxon Rudolph (1)
Poul Andersen (1) - pp - 7:35		Third period	10:58 - Braeden Cootes (2); 16:46 - Brock Cripps (1)
Matthew Kondro (35 saves / 39 shots)		Goalie stats	Michal Oršulák (22 saves / 23 shots)

March 28	Red Deer Rebels	0–6	Prince Albert Raiders	Art Hauser Centre	Recap
No scoring		First period	No scoring
No scoring		Second period	1:37 - pp - Brock Cripps (2); 3:37 - Ben Harvey (1); 8:19 - sh - Daxon Rudolph (2); 16:08 - pp - Riley Boychuk (1); 17:55 - pp - Brayden Dube (1)
No scoring		Third period	5:10 - Brayden Dube (2)
Matthew Kondro (30 saves / 36 shots); Peyton Shore (4 saves / 4 shots)		Goalie stats	Michal Oršulák (13 saves / 13 shots)

March 31	Prince Albert Raiders	4–2	Red Deer Rebels	Marchant Crane Centrium	Recap
Alisher Sarkenov (1) - 8:24; Alisher Sarkenov (2) - 19:00		First period	10:55 - pp - Patrick Sopiarz (1); 13:54 - pp - Kalder Varga (1)
Aiden Oiring (1) - 16:27		Second period	No scoring
Owen Corkish (1) - en - 19:44		Third period	No scoring
Michal Oršulák (18 saves / 20 shots)		Goalie stats	Matthew Kondro (22 saves / 25 shots)

April 1	Prince Albert Raiders	3–4	Red Deer Rebels	Marchant Crane Centrium	Recap
Brandon Gorzynski (1) - 4:35; Daxon Rudolph (3) - pp - 8:00		First period	19:12 - Cameron Dillard (1)
Connor Howe (1) - 8:15		Second period	2:45 - Cameron Dillard (2); 14:31 - Beckett Hamilton (1)
No scoring		Third period	1:24 - pp - Kalder Varga (2)
Michal Oršulák (9 saves / 13 shots)		Goalie stats	Matthew Kondro (35 saves / 38 shots)

April 3	Red Deer Rebels	3–4	OT	Prince Albert Raiders	Art Hauser Centre	Recap
Beckett Hamilton (2) - 11:38		First period		5:49 - Brock Cripps (3)
Kohen Lodge (1) - 17:28		Second period		2:08 - Owen Corkish (2); 14:26 - Linden Burrett (1)
Nate Yellowaga (1) - 19:13		Third period		No scoring
No scoring		First overtime period		2:21 - Brandon Gorzynski (2)
Matthew Kondro (48 saves / 52 shots)		Goalie stats		Michal Oršulák (20 saves / 23 shots)

Prince Albert wins series 4 – 1

==== (2) Medicine Hat Tigers vs. (7) Regina Pats ====
March 27	Regina Pats	2–6	Medicine Hat Tigers	Co-op Place	Recap
Mathis Paull (1) - 19:17		First period	9:45 - Shaeffer Gordon-Carroll (1)
Jace Egland (1) - 1:58		Second period	3:23 - Jonas Woo (1); 6:29 - Jonas Woo (2); 8:55 - pp - Bryce Pickford (1); 18:50 - Jonas Woo (3)
No scoring		Third period	14:20 - Yaroslav Bryzgalov (1)
Taylor Tabashniuk (19 saves / 25 shots)		Goalie stats	Jordan Switzer (16 saves / 18 shots)

March 28	Regina Pats	4–2	Medicine Hat Tigers	Co-op Place	Recap
Zachary Lansard (1) - 16:39		First period	17:49 - Ethan Neutens (1)
Ephram McNutt (1) - 6:01		Second period	No scoring
Ruslan Karimov (1) - 5:37; Jace Egland (2) - en - 19:10		Third period	6:29 - Markus Ruck (1)
Marek Schlenker (21 saves / 23 shots)		Goalie stats	Jordan Switzer (16 saves / 19 shots)

March 31	Medicine Hat Tigers	8–2	Regina Pats	Brandt Centre	Recap
Yaroslav Bryzgalov (2) - 7:47; Kade Stengrim (1) - 13:54; Bryce Pickford (2) - 19:25		First period	No scoring
Andrew Basha (1) - 9:53; Andrew Basha (2) - 12:25; Carter Cunningham (1) - 19:29		Second period	0:43 - pp - Ruslan Karimov (2); 12:54 - Liam Pue (1)
Noah Davidson (1) - 11:56; Shaeffer Gordon-Carroll (2) - 12:11		Third period	No scoring
Jordan Switzer (25 saves / 27 shots)		Goalie stats	Marek Schlenker (14 saves / 19 shots); Taylor Tabashniuk (17 saves / 20 shots)

April 1	Medicine Hat Tigers	4–2	Regina Pats	Brandt Centre	Recap
Kade Stengrim (2) - 10:40; Gavin Kor (1) - 18:50		First period	8:02 - Zachary Lansard (2)
Liam Ruck (1) - 11:57; Noah Davidson (2) - pp - 13:21		Second period	15:19 - Ruslan Karimov (3)
No scoring		Third period	No scoring
Carter Casey (28 saves / 30 shots)		Goalie stats	Taylor Tabashniuk (26 saves / 30 shots)

April 4	Regina Pats	4–5	OT	Medicine Hat Tigers	Co-op Place	Recap
Dayton Deschamps (1) - 1:20		First period		No scoring
Zachary Lansard (3) - pp - 1:54; Ruslan Karimov (4) - 2:17; Ellis Mieyette (1) - 12:07		Second period		6:07 - pp - Andrew Basha (3); 18:18 - Noah Davidson (3); 19:55 - Bryce Pickford (3)
No scoring		Third period		15:36 - pp - Liam Ruck (2)
No scoring		First overtime period		0:51 - Cam Parr (1)
Marek Schlenker (32 saves / 37 shots)		Goalie stats		Jordan Switzer (17 saves / 21 shots)

Medicine Hat wins series 4 – 1

==== (3) Edmonton Oil Kings vs. (6) Saskatoon Blades ====
March 27	Saskatoon Blades	3–2	Edmonton Oil Kings	Rogers Place	Recap

March 29	Saskatoon Blades	3–4	OT	Edmonton Oil Kings	Rogers Place	Recap

March 31	Edmonton Oil Kings	3–4	Saskatoon Blades	SaskTel Centre	Recap
No scoring		First period	13:16 - pp – David Lewandowski (2)
Noa Ta'amu (1) – 0:54; Ryan Gower (1) – 3:00; Miroslav Holinka (2) – 6:26		Second period	17:50 – Rowan Calvert (1)
No scoring		Third period	8:36 – Tyler Parr (2); 12:33 – pp – Tristen Doyle (1)
Ethan Simcoe (29 saves / 33 shots)		Goalie stats	Evan Gardner (23 saves / 26 shots)

April 1	Edmonton Oil Kings	5–2	Saskatoon Blades	SaskTel Centre	Recap
Miroslav Holinka (3) – 7:34; Miroslav Holinka (4) – pp – 18:44		First period	14:21 - Kazden Mathies (1)
Lukas Sawchyn (1) – 4:29; Miroslav Holinka (5) – 19:38		Second period	15:33 – Hunter Laing (2)
Adam Jecho (1) – en – 19:58		Third period	No scoring
Ethan Simcoe (31 saves / 33 shots)		Goalie stats	Evan Gardner (23 saves / 27 shots)

April 3	Saskatoon Blades	4–2	Edmonton Oil Kings	Rogers Place	Recap
Zach Olsen (1) – 18:53		First period	14:27 – Miroslav Holinka (6)
Hunter Laing (3) – 1:45; Hayden Harsanyi (4) – 10:23		Second period	3:15 – Kayden Stroeder (2)
Tyler Parr (3) – en – 19:49		Third period	No scoring
Evan Gardner (35 saves / 37 shots)		Goalie stats	Ethan Simcoe (35 saves / 38 shots)

April 5	Edmonton Oil Kings	3–2	2OT	Saskatoon Blades	SaskTel Centre	Recap
Aaron Obobaifo (2) – 7:28; Dylan Dean (2) – pp – 16:34		First period		16:52 - Brayden Klimpke (1)
No scoring		Second period		No scoring
No scoring		Third period		19:53 - Cooper Williams (1)
Miroslav Holinka (7) – pp – 14:05		Second overtime period		No scoring
Parker Snell (37 saves / 39 shots)		Goalie stats		Evan Gardner (41 saves / 44 shots)

April 6	Saskatoon Blades	3–2	OT	Edmonton Oil Kings	Rogers Place	Recap
No scoring		First period		No scoring
David Lewandowski (3) – pp – 6:46		Second period		8:46 – pp – Aaron Obobaifo (3)
Cooper Williams (2) – 14:52		Third period		14:19 – Gavin Hodnett (1)
Rowan Calvert (2) – pp – 7:23		First overtime period		No scoring
Evan Gardner (30 saves / 32 shots)		Goalie stats		Parker Snell (29 saves / 32 shots)

Saskatoon wins series 4 – 3

==== (4) Calgary Hitmen vs. (5) Brandon Wheat Kings ====
March 27	Brandon Wheat Kings	0–1	3OT	Calgary Hitmen	Scotiabank Saddledome	Recap
No scoring		First period		No scoring
No scoring		Second period		No scoring
No scoring		Third period		No scoring
No scoring		Third overtime period		5:11 - Ethan Moore (1)
Filip Růžička (64 saves / 65 shots)		Goalie stats		Eric Tu (49 saves / 49 shots)

March 29	Brandon Wheat Kings	5–6	OT	Calgary Hitmen	Scotiabank Saddledome	Recap
No scoring		First period		8:30 - Kale Dach (1); 11:37 - Andrei Molgachev (1)
Jimmy Egan (1) - 11:38; Grayson Burzynski (1) - 12:57		Second period		15:23 - Julien Maze (1)
Luke Mistelbacher (1) - 0:57; Luke Mistelbacher (2) - 1:11; Jaxon Jacobson (1) - 7:34		Third period		12:53 - pp - Ethan Moore (2); 18:49 - Axel Hurtig (1)
No scoring		First overtime period		10:04 - pp - Ethan Moore (3)
Filip Růžička (38 saves / 44 shots)		Goalie stats		Eric Tu (26 saves / 31 shots)

March 31	Calgary Hitmen	3–1	Brandon Wheat Kings	Tundra Oil & Gas Place	Recap
Andrei Molgachev (2) – 18:39		First period	No scoring
Ethan Moore (4) – 14:37		Second period	15:49 – Luke Mistelbacher (3)
Landon Amrhein (1) – en – 18:16		Third period	No scoring
Eric Tu (35 saves / 36 shots)		Goalie stats	Filip Růžička (48 saves / 50 shots)

April 2	Calgary Hitmen	4–2	Brandon Wheat Kings	Tundra Oil & Gas Place	Recap
No scoring		First period	2:27 – Grayson Burzynski (2); 13:14 – pp – Chase Surkan (1)
Kale Dach (2) – 5:06		Second period	No scoring
Harrison Lodewyk (1) – 9:13; Ethan Moore (5) – 11:48; Julien Maze (2) – en – 18:44		Third period	No scoring
Eric Tu (28 saves / 30 shots)		Goalie stats	Filip Růžička (25 saves / 28 shots)

Calgary wins series 4 – 0

=== Western Conference ===
==== (1) Everett Silvertips vs. (8) Portland Winterhawks ====
March 27	Portland Winterhawks	1–8	Everett Silvertips	Angel of the Winds Arena	Recap
No scoring		First period	0:48 - Brek Liske (1); 1:37 - Mattias Uyeda (1); 17:44 - Zackary Shantz (1)
Nathan Free (1) - pp - 14:16		Second period	10:34 - pp - Julius Miettinen (1); 17:37 - Lukas Kaplan (1)
No scoring		Third period	4:30 - Julius Miettinen (2); 8:21 - pp - Matias Vanhanen (1); 15:30 - Hunter Rudolph (1)
Ondřej Štěbeták (34 saves / 39 shots); Cruz Chase (18 saves / 21 shots)		Goalie stats	Anders Miller (24 saves / 25 shots)

March 28	Portland Winterhawks	1–4	Everett Silvertips	Angel of the Winds Arena	Recap
Nathan Free (2) - pp - 9:36		First period	10:15 - Rhys Jamieson (1); 14:20 - Matias Vanhanen (2)
No scoring		Second period	7:44 - pp - Rylan Gould (1)
No scoring		Third period	18:57 - en - Julius Miettinen (3)
Ondřej Štěbeták (44 saves / 47 shots)		Goalie stats	Anders Miller (20 saves / 21 shots)

March 31	Everett Silvertips	7–0	Portland Winterhawks	Veterans Memorial Coliseum	Recap
Julius Miettinen (4) - 13:07		First period	No scoring
Matias Vanhanen (3) - 0:48; Mirco Dufour (1) - 16:34		Second period	No scoring
Shea Busch (1) - 5:23; Jaxsin Vaughan (1) - 8:17; Landon DuPont (1) - 9:15; Jesse Heslop (1) - 10:09		Third period	No scoring
Anders Miller (19 saves / 19 shots)		Goalie stats	Ondřej Štěbeták (43 saves / 50 shots)

April 1	Everett Silvertips	6–3	Portland Winterhawks	Veterans Memorial Coliseum	Recap
No scoring		First period	5:42 - Nathan Free (3)
Jaxsin Vaughan (2) - 6:11; Lukas Kaplan (2) - 14:39; Landon DuPont (2) - 15:53		Second period	5:05 - pp - Nathan Brown (1)
Zackary Shantz (2) - 1:12; Jesse Heslop (2) - pp - 6:25; Rylan Gould (2) - pp - 14:28		Third period	19:50 - Ryan Miller (1)
Anders Miller (30 saves / 33 shots)		Goalie stats	Ondřej Štěbeták (36 saves / 42 shots)

Everett wins series 4 – 0

==== (2) Penticton Vees vs. (7) Seattle Thunderbirds ====
March 27	Seattle Thunderbirds	2–3	OT	Penticton Vees	South Okanagan Events Centre	Recap
Noah Kosick (1) - 13:24		First period		6:01 - pp - Brady Birnie (1)
Antonio Martorana (1) - 17:31		Second period		9:19 - Jacob Kvasnicka (1)
No scoring		Third period		No scoring
No scoring		First overtime period		6:48 - Charlie Michaud (1)
Marek Sklenička (42 saves / 45 shots)		Goalie stats		A.J. Reyelts (25 saves / 27 shots)

March 28	Seattle Thunderbirds	1–4	Penticton Vees	South Okanagan Events Centre	Recap
No scoring		First period	16:37 - Louis Wehmann (1); 17:12 - Tristan Petersen (1)
Coster Dunn (1) - 17:03		Second period	7:59 - pp - Jacob Kvasnicka (2)
No scoring		Third period	4:49 - Ryden Evers (1)
Marek Sklenička (37 saves / 41 shots)		Goalie stats	A.J. Reyelts (29 saves / 30 shots)

March 31	Penticton Vees	4–3	Seattle Thunderbirds	accesso ShoWare Center	Recap
Brady Birnie (2) - 12:19		First period	No scoring
Jacob Kvasnicka (3) - 14:36		Second period	1:07 - Cameron Schmidt (1); 11:18 - Cameron Schmidt (2)
Ryden Evers (2) - 10:06; Ethan Weber (1) - 14:19		Third period	19:38 - Joe Gramer (1)
A.J. Reyelts (29 saves / 32 shots)		Goalie stats	Grayson Malinoski (36 saves / 40 shots)

April 1	Penticton Vees	3–4	Seattle Thunderbirds	accesso ShoWare Center	Recap
No scoring		First period	13:59 - Joe Gramer (2)
Brittan Alstead (1) - 16:57		Second period	4:07 - Matthew Gard (1); 7:53 - Brock England (1); 12:31 - Coster Dunn (2)
Ryden Evers (3) - 0:24; Samuel Drančák (1) - 15:27		Third period	No scoring
Ethan McCallum (16 saves / 20 shots)		Goalie stats	Marek Sklenička (50 saves / 53 shots)

April 3	Seattle Thunderbirds	3–6	Penticton Vees	South Okanagan Events Centre	Recap
Cameron Schmidt (3) - 8:11		First period	3:42 - Ryden Evers (4); 17:31 - Louis Wehmann (2)
No scoring		Second period	8:35 - Nolan Stevenson (1); 14:58 - Louis Wehmann (3)
Tai Riley (1) - 4:43; Coster Dunn (3) - 14:39		Third period	4:05 - ps - Jacob Kvasnicka (4); 18:13 - en - Jacob Kvasnicka (5)
Marek Sklenička (29 saves / 34 shots)		Goalie stats	A.J. Reyelts (28 saves / 31 shots)

Penticton wins series 4 – 1

==== (3) Prince George Cougars vs. (6) Spokane Chiefs ====
March 27	Spokane Chiefs	3–6	Prince George Cougars	CN Centre	Recap
Assanali Sarkenov (1) – 1:20; Owen Martin (1) – pp – 8:06; Sam Oremba (1) – 16:48		First period	0:51 – Aiden Foster (1)
No scoring		Second period	2:17 – pp – Arsenii Anisimov (1); 13:31 – pp – Terik Parascak (1)
No scoring		Third period	1:26 - pp - Brock Souch (1); 11:41 – Brock Souch (2); 13:51 – Bauer Dumanski (1)
Carter Esler (41 saves / 47 shots)		Goalie stats	Joshua Ravensbergen (19 saves / 22 shots)

March 28	Spokane Chiefs	2–3	Prince George Cougars	CN Centre	Recap
No scoring		First period	9:27 – Brock Souch (3); 11:18 – Lee Shurgot (1)
No scoring		Second period	8:24 – pp – Kooper Gizowski (1)
Ethan Hughes (1) – sh – 7:23; Tyus Sparks (1) – 17:23		Third period	No scoring
Linus Vieillard (21 saves / 24 shots)		Goalie stats	Joshua Ravensbergen (43 saves / 45 shots)

March 30	Prince George Cougars	3–2	OT	Spokane Chiefs	Numerica Veterans Arena	Recap
No scoring		First period		No scoring
Brock Souch (4) – sh – 6:28; Kayden Lemire (1) – 14:58		Second period		12:16 – Coco Armstrong (1); 18:48 – Tyus Sparks (2)
No scoring		Third period		No scoring
Arsenii Anisimov (2) – pp – 1:06		First overtime period		No scoring
Joshua Ravensbergen (30 saves / 32 shots)		Goalie stats		Carter Esler (29 saves / 32 shots)

April 1	Prince George Cougars	2–3	Spokane Chiefs	Numerica Veterans Arena	Recap
No scoring		First period	9:52 – sh – Owen Martin (2)
Townes Kozicky (1) – 4:55		Second period	15:16 – Assanali Sarkenov (2); 16:14 – Gavin Burcar (1)
Lee Shurgot (2) – 18:20		Third period	No scoring
Joshua Ravensbergen (41 saves / 44 shots)		Goalie stats	Carter Esler (23 saves / 25 shots)

April 2	Prince George Cougars	3–4	OT	Spokane Chiefs	Numerica Veterans Arena	Recap
No scoring		First period		No scoring
Brock Souch (5) – pp – 8:07; Terik Parascak (2) – pp – 19:18		Second period		13:08 – Sam Oremba (2)
Kooper Gizowski (2) – pp – 2:38		Third period		9:20 – pp – Owen Martin (3); 19:04 – Chase Harrington (1)
No scoring		First overtime period		12:39 – Chase Harrington (2)
Joshua Ravensbergen (36 saves / 40 shots)		Goalie stats		Carter Esler (26 saves / 29 shots)

April 5	Spokane Chiefs	3–5	Prince George Cougars	CN Centre	Recap
Owen Martin (4) – 8:40		First period	17:34 – Dmitri Yakutsenak (1)
Owen Martin (5) – 4:42		Second period	1:49 – pp – Kooper Gizowski (3); 11:39 – Riley Ashe (1); 13:09 – Dmitri Yakutsenak (2)
Sam Oremba (3) – 19:56		Third period	19:32 – en – Terik Parascak (3)
Carter Esler (24 saves / 28 shots)		Goalie stats	Joshua Ravensbergen (21 saves / 24 shots)

Prince George wins series 4 – 2

==== (4) Kelowna Rockets vs. (5) Kamloops Blazers ====
March 27	Kamloops Blazers	1–3	Kelowna Rockets	Prospera Place	Recap
No scoring		First period	No scoring
No scoring		Second period	10:15 - pp - Vojtěch Čihař (1)
Jacob Dumansky (1) - 19:55		Third period	10:18 - pp - Tij Iginla (1); 18:33 - en - Vojtěch Čihař (2)
Logan Edmonstone (26 saves / 28 shots)		Goalie stats	Harrison Boettiger (16 saves / 17 shots)

March 28	Kamloops Blazers	1–5	Kelowna Rockets	Prospera Place	Recap
No scoring		First period	16:44 - Vojtěch Čihař (3); 19:10 - Tij Iginla (2)
JP Hurlbert (1) - 13:23		Second period	5:45 - Jacob Henderson (1)
No scoring		Third period	7:32 - Carson Wetsch (1); 15:43 - Tij Iginla (3)
Logan Edmonstone (44 saves / 49 shots)		Goalie stats	Harrison Boettiger (34 saves / 35 shots)

March 31	Kelowna Rockets	7–4	Kamloops Blazers	Sandman Centre	Recap
Tij Iginla (4) - 6:37; Nate Corbet (1) - 13:05; Dawson Gerwing (1) - 15:16		First period	No scoring
Tij Iginla (5) - 3:56		Second period	0:12 - Jordan Keller (1); 7:39 - Isa Guram (1)
Vojtěch Čihař (4) - 2:49; Ryan Oothoudt (1) - 3:18; Rowan Guest (1) - en - 17:41		Third period	13:07 - Ryan Michael (1); 17:26 - Jacob Dumansky (2)
Harrison Boettiger (33 saves / 37 shots)		Goalie stats	Logan Edmonstone (9 saves / 12 shots); Ivans Kufterins (25 saves / 28 shots)

April 1	Kelowna Rockets	6–2	Kamloops Blazers	Sandman Centre	Recap
Vojtěch Čihař (5) - 18:19		First period	2:04 - pp - Tommy Lafrenière (1)
Hayden Paupanekis (1) - pp - 4:06; Dawson Gerwing (2) - 16:30		Second period	No scoring
Tomáš Poletín (1) - 4:26; Vojtěch Čihař (6) - 6:47; Carson Wetsch (2) - 17:16		Third period	11:15 - Tommy Lafrenière (2)
Harrison Boettiger (31 saves / 33 shots)		Goalie stats	Logan Edmonstone (24 saves / 30 shots)

Kelowna wins series 4 – 0

== Conference semifinals ==
=== Eastern Conference ===
==== (1) Prince Albert Raiders vs. (6) Saskatoon Blades ====
April 10	Saskatoon Blades	1–6	Prince Albert Raiders	Art Hauser Centre	Recap
No scoring		First period	3:41 - Aiden Oiring (2); 5:17 - Daxon Rudolph (4); 15:58 - Alisher Sarkenov (3)
No scoring		Second period	12:01 - Brandon Gorzynski (3)
Zac Olsen (2) - pp - 10:52		Third period	1:31 - pp - Aiden Oiring (3); 2:37 - pp - Brayden Dube (3)
Evan Gardner (27 saves / 31 shots); Ryley Budd (9 saves / 11 shots)		Goalie stats	Michal Oršulák (16 saves / 17 shots)

April 11	Saskatoon Blades	0–3	Prince Albert Raiders	Art Hauser Centre	Recap
No scoring		First period	No scoring
No scoring		Second period	13:40 - Owen Corkish (3); 17:56 - Jonah Sivertson (1)
No scoring		Third period	1:01 - Matyáš Man (1)
Evan Gardner (34 saves / 37 shots)		Goalie stats	Michal Oršulák (15 saves / 15 shots)

April 14	Prince Albert Raiders	4–0	Saskatoon Blades	SaskTel Centre	Recap
Brandon Gorzynski (4) - 3:19		First period	No scoring
Braeden Cootes (3) - 1:04; Braeden Cootes (4) - 5:46		Second period	No scoring
Evan Smith (1) - sh - en - 19:29		Third period	No scoring
Michal Oršulák (23 saves / 23 shots)		Goalie stats	Evan Gardner (37 saves / 40 shots)

April 15	Prince Albert Raiders	5–3	Saskatoon Blades	SaskTel Centre	Recap
Braeden Cootes (5) - 1:10; Maddix McCagherty (1) - 4:54; Matyáš Man (2) - 6:54; Daxon Rudolph (5) - 17:03		First period	6:40 - David Lewandowski (4)
Max Heise (1) - 19:03		Second period	11:39 - Hunter Laing (4); 15:30 - pp - Tyler Parr (4)
No scoring		Third period	No scoring
Michal Oršulák (23 saves / 26 shots)		Goalie stats	Evan Gardner (25 saves / 30 shots)

Prince Albert wins series 4 – 0

==== (2) Medicine Hat Tigers vs. (4) Calgary Hitmen ====
April 10	Calgary Hitmen	2–3	OT	Medicine Hat Tigers	Co-op Place	Recap
No scoring		First period		No scoring
Kale Dach (3) - 19:39		Second period		18:53 - Kade Stengrim (3)
Ethan Moore (6) - 11:39		Third period		1:41 - pp - Bryce Pickford (4)
No scoring		First overtime period		19:00 - Bryce Pickford (5)
Eric Tu (40 saves / 43 shots)		Goalie stats		Carter Casey (27 saves / 29 shots)

April 11	Calgary Hitmen	3–4	Medicine Hat Tigers	Co-op Place	Recap
Caine Wilke (1) - 4:45; Keaton Jundt (1) - 9:47; Ethan Moore (7) - pp - 12:53		First period	10:32 - Kadon McCann (1)
No scoring		Second period	4:28 - Kade Stengrim (4); 7:50 - Jonas Woo (4)
No scoring		Third period	4:30 - Josh Van Mulligen (1)
Eric Tu (20 saves / 24 shots)		Goalie stats	Jordan Switzer (27 saves / 30 shots)

April 13	Medicine Hat Tigers	5–2	Calgary Hitmen	Scotiabank Saddledome	Recap
Liam Ruck (3) - 1:19		First period	1:04 - Ethan Moore (8); 7:34 - Wyatt Pisarczyk (1)
Liam Ruck (4) - sh - 4:49; Markus Ruck (2) - 11:51		Second period	No scoring
Liam Ruck (5) - en - 18:22; Ethan Neutens (2) - en - 19:29		Third period	No scoring
Carter Casey (34 saves / 36 shots)		Goalie stats	Eric Tu (23 saves / 26 shots)

April 15	Medicine Hat Tigers	5–2	Calgary Hitmen	Scotiabank Saddledome	Recap
Noah Davidson (4) - 5:59		First period	9:49 - Blake Vanek (1)
Veeti Väisänen (1) - 10:23; Jonas Woo (5) - pp - 14:56		Second period	5:04 - Ethan Moore (9)
Kade Stengrim (5) - 10:43; Ethan Neutens (3) - en - 18:19		Third period	No scoring
Jordan Switzer (22 saves / 24 shots)		Goalie stats	Eric Tu (26 saves / 30 shots)

Medicine Hat wins series 4 – 0

=== Western Conference ===
==== (1) Everett Silvertips vs. (4) Kelowna Rockets ====
April 10	Kelowna Rockets	1–4	Everett Silvertips	Angel of the Winds Arena	Recap
No scoring		First period	11:50 - pp - Shea Busch (2)
Ty Halaburda (1) - 0:23		Second period	4:20 - Matias Vanhanen (4); 16:14 - Julius Miettinen (5)
No scoring		Third period	18:17 - en - Matias Vanhanen (5)
Harrison Boettiger (36 saves / 39 shots)		Goalie stats	Anders Miller (21 saves / 22 shots)

April 11	Kelowna Rockets	2–4	Everett Silvertips	Angel of the Winds Arena	Recap
Hayden Paupanekis (2) - 17:39		First period	4:56 - Zackary Shantz (3)
Owen Folstrom (1) - 6:58		Second period	1:19 - Jaxsin Vaughan (3); 15:35 - pp - Carter Bear (1)
No scoring		Third period	9:01 - pp - Julius Miettinen (6)
Harrison Boettiger (34 saves / 38 shots)		Goalie stats	Anders Miller (37 saves / 39 shots)

April 14	Everett Silvertips	4–1	Kelowna Rockets	Prospera Place	Recap
No scoring		First period	No scoring
Matias Vanhanen (6) - 7:45; Brek Liske (2) - 8:09; Julius Miettinen (7) - 16:56		Second period	No scoring
Lukas Kaplan (3) - ps - 16:24		Third period	5:52 - pp - Tomáš Poletín (2)
Anders Miller (36 saves / 37 shots)		Goalie stats	Harrison Boettiger (23 saves / 27 shots)

April 15	Everett Silvertips	3–4	OT	Kelowna Rockets	Prospera Place	Recap
Julius Miettinen (8) - 1:04; Matias Vanhanen (7) - pp - 8:47; Brek Liske (3) - 14:10		First period		No scoring
No scoring		Second period		No scoring
No scoring		Third period		7:54 - pp - Tij Iginla (6); 12:11 - Hiroki Gojsic (1); 19:52 - pp - Shane Smith (1)
No scoring		First overtime period		2:30 - Tij Iginla (7)
Anders Miller (20 saves / 24 shots)		Goalie stats		Harrison Boettiger (7 saves / 10 shots); Josh Banini (29 saves / 29 shots)

April 17	Kelowna Rockets	1–2	OT	Everett Silvertips	Angel of the Winds Arena	Recap
No scoring		First period		No scoring
No scoring		Second period		No scoring
Shane Smith (2) - 18:47		Third period		11:34 - sh - Carter Bear (2)
No scoring		First overtime period		0:40 - Landon DuPont (3)
Josh Banini (53 saves / 55 shots)		Goalie stats		Anders Miller (30 saves / 31 shots)

Everett wins series 4 – 1

==== (2) Penticton Vees vs. (3) Prince George Cougars ====
April 10	Prince George Cougars	4–1	Penticton Vees	South Okanagan Events Centre	Recap
Jett Lajoie (1) - 8:23		First period	No scoring
Terik Parascak (4) - pp - 19:47		Second period	No scoring
Lee Shurgot (3) - 0:43; Terik Parascak (5) - en - 15:30		Third period	18:58 - Noah Milford (1)
Joshua Ravensbergen (34 saves / 35 shots)		Goalie stats	A.J. Reyelts (16 saves / 19 shots)

April 11	Prince George Cougars	6–2	Penticton Vees	South Okanagan Events Centre	Recap
Terik Parascak (6) - sh - 6:35; Tyrone Sobry (1) - sh - 6:47; Terik Parascak (7) - pp - 15:52; Jett Lajoie (2) - 19:20		First period	No scoring
Dawson Seitz (1) - 18:25		Second period	No scoring
Jett Lajoie (3) - pp - 7:49		Third period	8:27 - Louis Wehmann (4); 10:43 - Brady Birnie (3)
Joshua Ravensbergen (40 saves / 42 shots)		Goalie stats	A.J. Reyelts (7 saves / 11 shots); Ethan McCallum (12 saves / 14 shots)

April 14	Penticton Vees	5–3	Prince George Cougars	CN Centre	Recap
No scoring		First period	16:20 - pp - Aiden Foster (2); 18:51 - Brock Souch (6)
Matteo Danis (1) - 13:40; Ryden Evers (5) - 13:50		Second period	No scoring
Brady Birnie (4) - 12:15; Brady Birnie (5) - 18:07; Jacob Kvasnicka (6) - en - 19:08		Third period	15:47 - Dmitri Yakutsenak (3)
A.J. Reyelts (18 saves / 21 shots)		Goalie stats	Joshua Ravensbergen (24 saves / 28 shots)

April 15	Penticton Vees	5–2	Prince George Cougars	CN Centre	Recap
Louis Wehmann (5) - 8:21		First period	16:38 - pp - Kooper Gizowski (4)
Ryden Evers (6) - pp - 6:24		Second period	16:50 - Lee Shurgot (4)
Nolan Stevenson (2) - pp - 15:44; Ethan Weber (2) - pp - 17:31; Brady Birnie (6) - pp - 19:09		Third period	No scoring
A.J. Reyelts (27 saves / 29 shots)		Goalie stats	Joshua Ravensbergen (30 saves / 35 shots)

April 17	Prince George Cougars	0–1	Penticton Vees	South Okanagan Events Centre	Recap
No scoring		First period	10:27 - pp - Brittan Alstead (2)
No scoring		Second period	No scoring
No scoring		Third period	No scoring
Joshua Ravensbergen (28 saves / 29 shots)		Goalie stats	A.J. Reyelts (25 saves / 29 shots)

April 19	Penticton Vees	3–2	OT	Prince George Cougars	CN Centre	Recap
No scoring		First period		No scoring
No scoring		Second period		3:44 - Carson Carels (1); 17:12 - pp - Lee Shurgot (5)
Diego Johnson (1) - 1:58; Doogan Pedersen (1) - 13:23		Third period		No scoring
Jacob Kvasnicka (7) - 62:16		First overtime period		No scoring
A.J. Reyelts (40 saves / 42 shots)		Goalie stats		Joshua Ravensbergen (22 saves / 25 shots)

Penticton wins series 4 – 2

== Conference finals ==
=== Eastern Conference ===
==== (1) Prince Albert Raiders vs. (2) Medicine Hat Tigers ====
April 24	Medicine Hat Tigers	3–8	Prince Albert Raiders	Art Hauser Centre	Recap
Markus Ruck (3) - 15:37		First period	6:23 - Brayden Dube (4); 17:16 - Justice Christensen (1)
Shaeffer Gordon-Carroll (3) - 16:58		Second period	2:43 - Ben Harvey (2); 13:53 - pp - Max Heise (2)
Bryce Pickford (6) - 8:01		Third period	3:37 - pp - Aiden Oiring (4); 6:46 - pp - Alisher Sarkenov (4); 15:40 - Aiden Oiring (5); 19:41 - Evan Smith (2)
Carter Casey (31 saves / 39 shots)		Goalie stats	Michal Oršulák (21 saves / 24 shots)

April 25	Medicine Hat Tigers	5–0	Prince Albert Raiders	Art Hauser Centre	Recap
Noah Davidson (5) - 19:54		First period	No scoring
Liam Ruck (6) - pp - 16:13; Markus Ruck (4) - 12:49		Second period	No scoring
Jonas Woo (6) - en - 18:05; Niilopekka Muhonen (1) - 18:41		Third period	No scoring
Jordan Switzer (30 saves / 30 shots)		Goalie stats	Michal Oršulák (36 saves / 40 shots)

April 28	Prince Albert Raiders	1–2	OT	Medicine Hat Tigers	Co-op Place	Recap
15:33 - Daxon Rudolph (6)		First period		No scoring
No scoring		Second period		16:07 - pp - Kade Stengrim (6)
No scoring		Third period		No scoring
No scoring		First overtime period		4:07 - Liam Ruck (7)
Michal Oršulák (19 saves / 21 shots)		Goalie stats		Jordan Switzer (37 saves / 38 shots)

April 29	Prince Albert Raiders	6–3	Medicine Hat Tigers	Co-op Place	Recap
Daxon Rudolph (7) - pp - 10:16; Evan Smith (3) - 11:40		First period	11:48 - Shaeffer Gordon-Carroll (4)
Daxon Rudolph (8) - pp - 0:25; Aiden Oiring (6) - 4:15; Maddix McCagherty (2) - 6:33		Second period	6:58 - Ethan Neutens (4)
Max Heise (3) - 9:07		Third period	15:20 - Shaeffer Gordon-Carroll (5)
Michal Oršulák (23 saves / 26 shots)		Goalie stats	Jordan Switzer (12 saves / 16 shots); Carter Casey (18 saves / 20 shots)

May 1	Medicine Hat Tigers	3–6	Prince Albert Raiders	Art Hauser Centre	Recap
Jonas Woo (7) - 17:10		First period	5:00 - Alisher Sarkenov (5)
No scoring		Second period	0:22 - Owen Corkish (4); 8:57 - Ben Harvey (3); 13:36 - Owen Corkish (5)
Ethan Neutens (5) - 1:55; Josh Van Mulligen (2) - 9:19		Third period	17:29 - en - Owen Corkish (6); 18:31 - en - Brayden Dube (5)
Carter Casey (41 saves / 45 shots)		Goalie stats	Michal Oršulák (25 saves / 28 shots)

May 3	Prince Albert Raiders	7–6	Medicine Hat Tigers	Co-op Place	Recap
Riley Boychuk (2) - 15:43		First period	13:29 - Jonas Woo (8)
Braeden Cootes (6) - pp - 3:47; Daxon Rudolph (9) - 5:39; Aiden Oiring (7) - pp - 13:12; Brayden Dube (6) - 17:59; Jonah Sivertson (2) - 19:27		Second period	1:15 - pp - Noah Davidson (6); 8:31 - Luke Cozens (1)
Riley Boychuk (3) - 12:59		Third period	2:20 - pp - Kade Stengrim (7); 6:59 - Josh Van Mulligen (3); 19:54 - Liam Ruck (8)
Michal Oršulák (24 saves / 30 shots)		Goalie stats	Jordan Switzer (10 saves / 13 shots); Carter Casey (14 saves / 18 shots)

Prince Albert wins series 4 – 2

=== Western Conference ===
==== (1) Everett Silvertips vs. (2) Penticton Vees ====
April 23	Penticton Vees	1–4	Everett Silvertips	Angel of the Winds Arena	Recap
No scoring		First period	12:12 - Landon DuPont (4)
No scoring		Second period	15:16 - Jaxsin Vaughan (4)
Ryden Evers (7) - 3:01		Third period	8:32 - Hunter Rudolph (2); 19:15 - en - Kayd Ruedig (1)
A.J. Reyelts (27 saves / 30 shots)		Goalie stats	Anders Miller (23 saves / 24 shots)

April 25	Penticton Vees	4–5	2OT	Everett Silvertips	Angel of the Winds Arena	Recap
Brady Birnie (7) - 2:20		First period		3:16 - Carter Bear (3); 18:35 - Matias Vanhanen (8)
Diego Johnson (2) - 7:17		Second period		15:51 - pp - Rylan Gould (3)
Brady Birnie (8) - 2:32; Ethan Weber (3) - 19:04		Third period		11:43 - Shea Busch (3)
No scoring		Second overtime period		6:41 - pp - Rylan Gould (4)
A.J. Reyelts (48 saves / 53 shots)		Goalie stats		Anders Miller (29 saves / 33 shots)

April 27	Everett Silvertips	4–3	Penticton Vees	South Okanagan Events Centre	Recap
Zackary Shantz (4) - 2:54		First period	0:37 - Ethan Weber (4)
Julius Miettinen (9) - 9:13		Second period	0:46 - Nolan Stevenson (3)
Matias Vanhanen (9) - 4:37; Rhys Jamieson (2) - 5:41		Third period	15:44 - Brady Birnie (9)
Anders Miller (21 saves / 24 shots)		Goalie stats	A.J. Reyelts (23 saves / 27 shots)

April 28	Everett Silvertips	4–2	Penticton Vees	South Okanagan Events Centre	Recap
No scoring		First period	15:33 - pp - Nolan Stevenson (4)
Nolan Chastko (1) - 4:01		Second period	5:02 - Jacob Kvasnicka (8)
Jesse Heslop (3) - 11:05; Matias Vanhanen (10) - 13:05; Julius Miettinen (10) - en - 18:13		Third period	No scoring
Anders Miller (26 saves / 28 shots)		Goalie stats	A.J. Reyelts (28 saves / 31 shots)

Everett wins series 4 – 0

== WHL Championship ==
=== (W1) Everett Silvertips vs. (E1) Prince Albert Raiders ===
May 8	Prince Albert Raiders	4–2	Everett Silvertips	Angel of the Winds Arena	Recap
No scoring		First period	6:07 - Carter Bear (4)
Jonah Sivertson (3) - 5:12; Braeden Cootes (7) - 15:07; Justice Christensen (2) - 17:50		Second period	No scoring
Aiden Oiring (8) - en - 18:55		Third period	17:51 - pp - Julius Miettinen (11)
Michal Oršulák (39 saves / 41 shots)		Goalie stats	Anders Miller (22 saves / 25 shots)

May 9	Prince Albert Raiders	2–6	Everett Silvertips	Angel of the Winds Arena	Recap
No scoring		First period	3:20 - Carter Bear (5); 5:31 - Kayd Ruedig (2); 19:17 - pp - Rylan Gould (5)
Brock Cripps (4) - pp - 4:24		Second period	19:14 - Carter Bear (6)
Justice Christensen (3) - 9:46		Third period	18:58 - en - Julius Miettinen (12); 19:59 - pp - Jesse Heslop (4)
Michal Oršulák (32 saves / 37 shots)		Goalie stats	Anders Miller (37 saves / 39 shots)

May 12	Everett Silvertips	3–2	Prince Albert Raiders	Art Hauser Centre	Recap
Matias Vanhanen (11) – 11:45		First period	18:19 – pp – Max Heise (4)
Luke Vlooswyk (1) – 18:07		Second period	1:59 – Ben Harvey (4)
Julius Miettinen (13) – 15:32		Third period	No scoring
Anders Miller (18 saves / 20 shots)		Goalie stats	Michal Oršulák (41 saves / 44 shots)

May 13	Everett Silvertips	5–2	Prince Albert Raiders	Art Hauser Centre	Recap
Julius Miettinen (14) – 0:32		First period	No scoring
Ryan Gould (6) – pp – 18:43		Second period	9:53 – Brandon Gorzynski (5)
Carter Bear (7) – pp – 4:24; Shea Busch (4) – 10:20; Matias Vanhanen (12) – en – 17:35		Third period	6:43 – Justice Christensen (4)
Anders Miller (31 saves / 33 shots)		Goalie stats	Michal Oršulák (30 saves / 34 shots)

May 15	Everett Silvertips	7–2	Prince Albert Raiders	Art Hauser Centre	Recap
Shea Busch (5) – 1:08; Mattias Uyeda (2) – 15:57		First period	No scoring
Brek Liske (4) – 14:51; Shea Busch (6) – pp – 19:16		Second period	3:38 – Brayden Dube (7)
Shea Busch (7) – 6:17; Nolan Chastko (2) – 7:07; Landon DuPont (5) – pp – 15:50		Third period	11:04 – pp – Justice Christensen
Anders Miller (22 saves / 24 shots)		Goalie stats	Michal Oršulák (29 saves / 36 shots)

Everett wins series 4–1

== Playoff scoring leaders ==
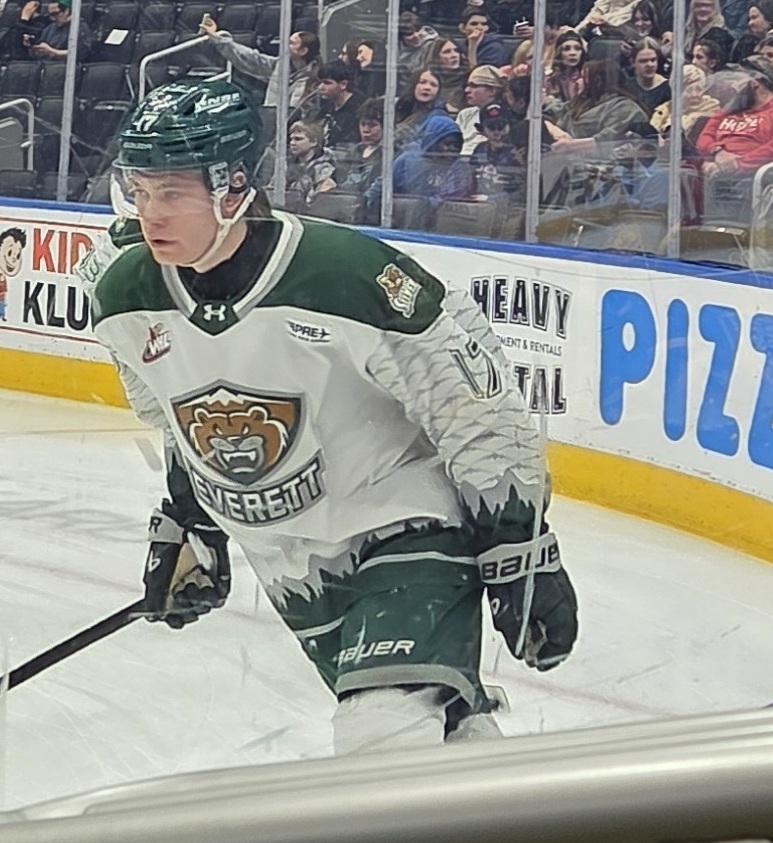
Julius Miettinen led the playoffs in scoring with 27 points in 18 games

Note: GP = Games played; G = Goals; A = Assists; Pts = Points; PIM = Penalty minutes.

Player	Team	GP	G	A	Pts	PIM
Julius Miettinen	Everett Silvertips	18	14	13	27	25
Daxon Rudolph	Prince Albert Raiders	19	9	18	27	25
Matias Vanhanen	Everett Silvertips	18	12	12	24	6
Braeden Cootes	Prince Albert Raiders	20	7	16	23	2
Landon DuPont	Everett Silvertips	18	5	18	23	24
Carter Bear	Everett Silvertips	18	7	15	22	24
Brock Cripps	Prince Albert Raiders	20	4	17	21	9
Andrew Basha	Medicine Hat Tigers	15	3	18	21	8
Aiden Oiring	Prince Albert Raiders	20	8	12	20	8
Brayden Dube	Prince Albert Raiders	20	7	12	19	26

== Playoff leading goaltenders ==
Note: GP = Games played; Mins = Minutes played; W = Wins; L = Losses; GA = Goals Allowed; SO = Shutouts; SV% = Save percentage; GAA = Goals against average

Player	Team	GP	Mins	W	L	GA	SO	Sv%	GAA
Josh Banini	Kelowna Rockets	2	107	1	1	2	0	.976	1.12
Anders Miller	Everett Silvertips	18	1,068	16	2	34	1	.932	1.91
Parker Snell	Edmonton Oil Kings	4	297	2	2	11	0	.924	2.22
Eric Tu	Calgary Hitmen	8	550	4	4	22	1	.918	2.40
Filip Růžička	Brandon Wheat Kings	4	292	0	4	12	0	.936	2.47

== WHL awards ==
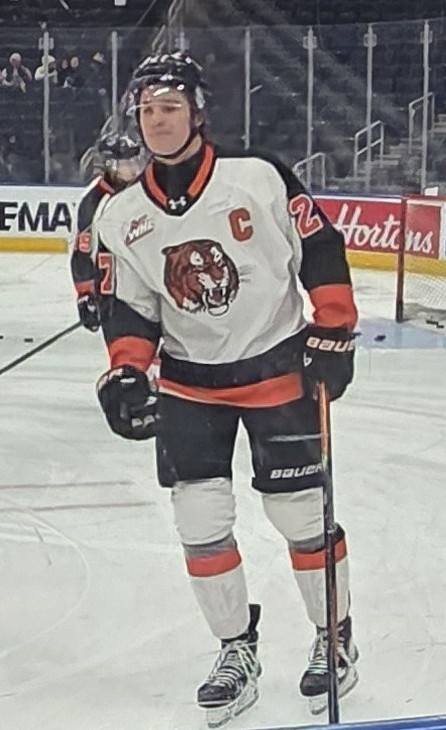
Bryce Pickford was awarded the Four Broncos Memorial Trophy as the league's player of the year, and the Bill Hunter Memorial Trophy as the best defenceman.

Scotty Munro Memorial Trophy	Regular season champions	Everett Silvertips
Four Broncos Memorial Trophy	Player of the Year	Bryce Pickford, Medicine Hat Tigers
Bob Clarke Trophy	Top Scorer	Markus Ruck, Medicine Hat Tigers
Bill Hunter Memorial Trophy	Top Defenceman	Bryce Pickford, Medicine Hat Tigers
Jim Piggott Memorial Trophy	Rookie of the Year	JP Hurlbert, Kamloops Blazers
Del Wilson Trophy	Top Goaltender	Joshua Ravensbergen, Prince George Cougars
WHL Plus-Minus Award	Top Plus-Minus Rating	Tarin Smith, Everett Silvertips
Brad Hornung Trophy	Most Sportsmanlike Player	Braeden Cootes, Prince Albert Raiders
Daryl K. (Doc) Seaman Trophy	Scholastic player of the Year	Alex Weiermaier, Portland Winterhawks
Jim Donlevy Memorial Trophy	Scholastic team of the Year	Regina Pats
Dunc McCallum Memorial Trophy	Coach of the Year	Steve Hamilton, Everett Silvertips
Lloyd Saunders Memorial Trophy	Executive of the Year	Fred Harbinson, Penticton Vees
Allen Paradice Memorial Trophy	Top Official	Mike Campbell
St. Clair Group Trophy	Marketing/Public Relations Award	Portland Winterhawks
Doug Wickenheiser Memorial Trophy	Humanitarian of the Year	Shane Smith, Kelowna Rockets
WHL Playoff MVP	WHL Finals Most Valuable Player	Julius Miettinen, Everett Silvertips
Professional Hockey Achievement; Academic Recipient	Alumni Achievement Awards	

=== All-Star teams ===
==== Eastern Conference ====
First Team		Pos.	Second Team	
Player	Team	Pos.	Player	Team
Michal Oršulák	Prince Albert Raiders	G	Filip Růžička; Chase Wutzke	Brandon Wheat Kings; Moose Jaw Warriors
Bryce Pickford	Medicine Hat Tigers	D	Jonas Woo	Medicine Hat Tigers
Daxon Rudolph	Prince Albert Raiders	D	Ethan MacKenzie	Edmonton Oil Kings
Liam Ruck	Prince Albert Raiders	F	Miroslav Holinka	Edmonton Oil Kings
Markus Ruck	Prince Albert Raiders	F	Jaxon Jacobson	Brandon Wheat Kings
Luke Mistelbacher	Brandon Wheat Kings	F	Kale Dach	Calgary Hitmen

==== Western Conference ====
First Team		Pos.	Second Team>	
Player	Team	Pos.	Player	Team
Joshua Ravensbergen	Prince George Cougars	G	Tobias Tvrznik	Wenatchee Wild
Landon DuPont	Everett Silvertips	D	Tarin Smith	Everett Silvertips
Carson Carels	Prince George Cougars	D	Ryan Lin	Vancouver Giants
Tij Iginla	Kelowna Rockets	F	Jacob Kvasnicka	Penticton Vees
JP Hurlbert	Kamloops Blazers	F	Julius Miettinen	Everett Silvertips
Cameron Schmidt	Vancouver/Seattle	F	Carter Bear	Everett Silvertips

== Attendance ==
=== Regular season ===
Home team	Home games	Average attendance	Total attendance
Edmonton Oil Kings	34	7,645	259,946
Spokane Chiefs	34	6,780	230,545
Everett Silvertips	34	6,567	223,278
Portland Winterhawks	34	5,160	175,466
Kelowna Rockets	34	4,664	158,582
Calgary Hitmen	34	4,492	152,746
Saskatoon Blades	34	4,464	151,797
Seattle Thunderbirds	34	4,458	151,592
Medicine Hat Tigers	34	4,125	140,277
Prince George Cougars	34	4,099	139,379
Tri-City Americans	34	3,923	133,398
Red Deer Rebels	34	3,851	130,945
Victoria Royals	34	3,805	129,374
Kamloops Blazers	34	3,764	127,993
Vancouver Giants	34	3,699	125,797
Lethbridge Hurricanes	34	3,552	120,800
Regina Pats	34	3,531	120,069
Penticton Vees	34	3,445	117,151
Brandon Wheat Kings	34	2,884	98,085
Wenatchee Wild	34	2,854	97,040
Prince Albert Raiders	34	2,668	90,734
Moose Jaw Warriors	34	2,667	90,690
Swift Current Broncos	34	2,207	75,040
League	782	4,144	3,240,724

=== Playoffs ===
Home team	Home games	Average attendance	Total attendance
Everett Silvertips	9	6,206	55,861
Prince George Cougars	6	5,527	33,165
Saskatoon Blades	5	5,411	27,058
Edmonton Oil Kings	4	5,225	20,901
Medicine Hat Tigers	8	5,129	41,032
Penticton Vees	8	4,186	33,493
Kelowna Rockets	4	3,965	15,861
Kamloops Blazers	2	3,582	7,165
Spokane Chiefs	3	3,467	10,402
Regina Pats	2	3,326	6,652
Portland Winterhawks	2	3,321	6,643
Prince Albert Raiders	11	3,236	35,601
Red Deer Rebels	2	3,036	6,073
Calgary Hitmen	4	2,894	11,577
Seattle Thunderbirds	2	2,548	5,096
Brandon Wheat Kings	2	1,254	2,508
League	74	4,312	319,088

== See also ==
- List of WHL seasons
- 2025–26 OHL season
- 2025–26 QMJHL season
- 2026 Memorial Cup

Preceded by 2024–25 WHL season	WHL seasons	Succeeded by 2026–27 WHL season
