= Reading book (disambiguation) =

A reading book or basal reader is a book used to teach children.

Reading book may also refer to:

- Book, a book used to record information
- Textbook, a book for standard work
- Comic book, a book of comic strips
- Novel, a long work of narrative form
- Chapter book, a book for intermediate readers
- Encyclopedia, a book providing summaries of knowledge
- Dictionary, a book for definitions

== See also ==
- Reading
- Book (disambiguation)
