= Ilia Morozov =

Russian ice hockey player (born 2008)

- Born: 3 August 2008 (age 18) Moscow, Russia
- Height: 6 ft 3 in (191 cm)
- Weight: 200 lb (91 kg; 14 st 4 lb)
- Position: Forward
- Shoots: Left
- NCAA team: Miami RedHawks
- NHL draft: 20th overall, 2026; Buffalo Sabres

Ilia Sergeyevich Morozov (born 3 August 2008) is a Russian college ice hockey player who is a forward for Miami RedHawks of the National Collegiate Athletic Association (NCAA). He was drafted 20th overall by the Buffalo Sabres in the 2026 NHL entry draft.

== Early life ==
Morozov was born in Moscow, Russia, and moved to Chicago at 14 years old to pursue ice hockey.

== Playing career ==
On 14 December 2023, Morozov signed with the Tri-City Storm of the United States Hockey League (USHL). In his first season in the United States, he recorded 33 goals and 41 assists in 49 games with the Windy City Storm, an affiliate of Tri-City Storm. During the 2024–25 season he recorded 11 goals and 11 assists in 59 regular season games.

On 17 February 2025, he signed with Miami University. During the 2025–26 season he was the youngest college ice hockey player at 17 years old. During his rookie year he recorded eight goals and 12 assists in 36 games.

On 26 June 2026, he was drafted in the first round, 20th overall, by the Buffalo Sabres in the 2026 NHL entry draft.

== Career statistics ==
			Regular season					Playoffs
Season	Team	League	GP	G	A	Pts	PIM	GP	G	A	Pts	PIM
2024–25	Tri-City Storm	USHL	59	11	11	22	20	2	0	0	0	0
2025–26	Miami University	NCHC	36	8	12	20	27	—	—	—	—	—
NCAA totals			36	8	12	20	27	—	—	—	—	—

Awards and achievements
Preceded by Daxon Rudolph	Buffalo Sabres first-round draft pick 2026	Succeeded by Incumbent
