= Oak View Group =

American sports and real estate company

Oak View Group, LLC
- Type: Private
- Industry: Venue management Hospitality Real estate development Professional sports Live Music
- Founded: 2015
- Founder: Tim Leiweke, Irving Azoff, and Daniel Griffis
- Headquarters: Denver, Colorado, United States
- Area served: Worldwide
- Key people: Irving Azoff (Senior Partner), Chris Granger (CEO), Daniel Griffis (President, Global Partnerships)
- Subsidiaries: Pollstar
- Website: www.oakviewgroup.com

Oak View Group, LLC (OVG) is an American professional sports, venue management, hospitality, sponsorships, booking and commercial real estate company based in Denver. It manages several sports venues, including Climate Pledge Arena in Seattle and UBS Arena in New York, which was constructed under the company's supervision. OVG was formed in 2015, by Tim Leiweke and his business partners, Irving Azoff and Daniel Griffis.

== Business developments ==
The former KeyArena in Seattle was redeveloped in preparation for the Seattle Kraken, the city's National Hockey League team. The new arena, named Climate Pledge Arena via a naming rights deal with Amazon, is also home to the WNBA's Seattle Storm. On December 4, 2017, the Seattle City Council voted 7–1 to approve a memorandum of understanding with the OVG for the redevelopment, which built a new subterranean arena on the existing site while retaining the historical landmarked roof and three exterior walls. Demolition and construction for the new arena began in 2018 and was fully completed in 2021. The company was competing against a rival proposal by Chris Hansen.

On December 7, the NHL's board of governors agreed to consider an application for an expansion team from Seattle, with an expansion fee set at $650 million. The Seattle ownership group was represented by David Bonderman and Jerry Bruckheimer. On February 20, Mayor Jenny Durkan launched an NHL campaign during her State of the Union and announced that the OVG would be initiating a season ticket drive on March 1, 2018. OVG manages Climate Pledge Arena.

The group is also a partner in UBS Arena with the New York Islanders. In December 2017, New York Arena Partners (a venture of the Islanders, OVG, and Sterling Equities) won a bid to construct a new, 18,000-seat arena and mixed-used district at Belmont Park, beating a competing proposal by New York City FC for a new soccer stadium. The new arena was completed in time for the 2021–22 season.

In 2016, OVG announced an "Arena Alliance" of independent arenas such as AT&T Center (San Antonio), Scotiabank Arena (Toronto), Amalie Arena (Tampa Bay), BB&T Center (Ft. Lauderdale), Bankers Life Fieldhouse (Indianapolis), Chase Center (San Francisco), PPG Paints Arena (Pittsburgh), KeyBank Center (Buffalo), The Forum (Los Angeles), Golden 1 Center (Sacramento), Little Caesars Arena (Detroit), Madison Square Garden (New York), Ball Arena (Denver), State Farm Arena (Atlanta), Prudential Center (Newark), Rocket Arena (Cleveland), Rogers Arena (Vancouver), Enterprise Center (St. Louis), United Center (Chicago), Wells Fargo Center (Philadelphia), and Xcel Energy Center (St. Paul).

In 2016, OVG acquired Venues Today, a trade publication for the live entertainment industry. In 2017, the company purchased Pollstar, a trade publication for the concert industry.

In 2018, it was announced that OVG and the University of Texas at Austin (UT) had agreed to build a new $338 million arena for the Texas Longhorns men's and women's basketball programs to replace the Frank Erwin Center. Under the agreement, UT has exclusive use of the arena for 60 days per year and receives all revenue from Longhorns games, while OVG and its partners Live Nation and C3 Presents have the right to hold events on the other days, receiving the bulk of the revenue from those dates. The arena, ultimately named Moody Center, opened in April 2022.

In 2019, OVG launched Oak View Group International. Based in London, it will focus on building arena and stadium development and partnership opportunities in the UK, Europe, the Middle East, and Asia. Jessica Koravos, president of Andrew Lloyd Webber’s Really Useful Group, and formerly MD of Anschutz Entertainment Group Live and COO of AEG Europe, is co-chair of OVG International alongside Tim Leiweke.

In February 2019, it was announced that OVG had become the arena manager of Webster Bank Arena, now known as Total Mortgage Arena, in Bridgeport, Connecticut. Oak View Group also will operate Acrisure Arena in Thousand Palms, California. Upon completion in December 2022, the arena became the home ice for the Kraken's American Hockey League affiliate, the Coachella Valley Firebirds.

In May 2021, OVG Global Partnerships, under the leadership of co-founder Daniel Griffis, secured its first Sports Business Journal (SBJ) award for Best in Sales, Consulting and Client Service. Since then, OVG Global Partnerships has been nominated 9 straight times for this award. VG Global Partnerships has sold more than $6.8B in sponsorships and 43 naming rights deals.

In August 2021, it was announced that OVG and Spectra, a venue management company, would be merging to form a full-service live events company. In October 2021, Oak View Group partnered with the Hamilton Urban Precinct Entertainment Group (HUPEG) to redevelop Hamilton, Ontario's Arts and Entertainment district, including a renovation of TD Coliseum.

In November 2021, Oak View Group and Thirty Five Ventures (founded by basketball star Kevin Durant) reached a 30-year agreement with Baltimore City to operate the city-owned arena, now called CFG Bank Arena. The arena underwent $250 million in renovations and reopened in April 2023.

In March 2022, OVG announced its largest project to date, a 20,000-seat arena in Las Vegas. The 25-acre site (10 ha) is south of the station for the high-speed rail line to the Los Angeles area, Brightline West.

On July 10, 2025, the Department of Justice indicted Tim Leiweke for violation of the Sherman Act in relation to bid rigging of a college stadium in Texas. As a result of the indictment, Oak View Group agreed to pay a $15M fine and Tim Leiweke stepped down as CEO. Tim Leiweke resigned from OVG in July 2025 and then received a presidential pardon on 2nd Dec 2025.

In April 2026, OVG announced a joint venture with Live Nation and Atletico Madrid on a new arena to open in the 4th quarter of 2029.
