= Carter Bear =

Canadian ice hockey player (born 2006)

- Born: November 4, 2006 (age 19) Winnipeg, Manitoba, Canada
- Height: 6 ft 0 in (183 cm)
- Weight: 180 lb (82 kg; 12 st 12 lb)
- Position: Forward
- Shoots: Left
- NHL team (P) Cur. team: Detroit Red Wings; Grand Rapids Griffins (AHL)
- NHL draft: 13th overall, 2025; Detroit Red Wings
- Playing career: 2026–present

Carter Bear (born November 4, 2006) is a Canadian professional ice hockey player for the Grand Rapids Griffins of the American Hockey League (AHL) as a prospect under contract to the Detroit Red Wings of the National Hockey League (NHL). He was drafted 13th overall by the Red Wings in the 2025 NHL entry draft.

== Playing career ==
On June 17, 2022, Bear signed a standard player agreement with the Everett Silvertips of the WHL. During the 2022–23 season, he recorded one goal and one assist in 19 games. He scored his first career goal during the final game of the regular season. During the 2023–24 season, he recorded 25 goals and 32 assists in 67 regular season games. During the playoffs he recorded four assists in nine games.

During the 2024–25 season, he recorded 40 goals and 42 assists in 56 regular season games. On October 22, 2024, he was selected to the CHL/USA Prospects Challenge. He led the team with 14 power play goals and nine game-winning goals, and was named to the Western Conference Second All-Star team. On March 9, 2025, he suffered a lacerated achilles tendon in a game against the Portland Winterhawks, ending his season.

== International play ==
Medal record

Representing Canada

Ice hockey

World Junior Championships
Bronze medal – third place	2026 United States	

Bear represented Canada at the 2026 World Junior Ice Hockey Championships and won a bronze medal.

== Personal life ==
Bear is of indigenous heritage. His parents, Conrad and Misty, come from Peguis First Nation.

== Career statistics ==
=== Regular season and playoffs ===
			Regular season					Playoffs
Season	Team	League	GP	G	A	Pts	PIM	GP	G	A	Pts	PIM
2022–23	Everett Silvertips	WHL	19	1	1	2	0	5	0	0	0	4
2023–24	Everett Silvertips	WHL	67	25	32	57	26	9	0	4	4	6
2024–25	Everett Silvertips	WHL	56	40	42	82	77	—	—	—	—	—
2025–26	Everett Silvertips	WHL	53	36	41	77	56	18	7	15	22	24
WHL totals			195	102	116	218	159	32	7	19	26	34

=== International ===
Year	Team	Event	Result	GP	G	A	Pts	PIM
2026	Canada	WJC	3rd place, bronze medalist(s)	2	0	0	0	0
Junior totals				2	0	0	0	0

== Awards and honours ==
Award	Year	Ref
WHL
Ed Chynoweth Cup	2026	

Awards and achievements
Preceded by Michael Brandsegg-Nygård	Detroit Red Wings first-round draft pick 2025	Succeeded by JP Hurlbert
