= South Okanagan Events Centre =

Indoor arena in British Columbia, Canada

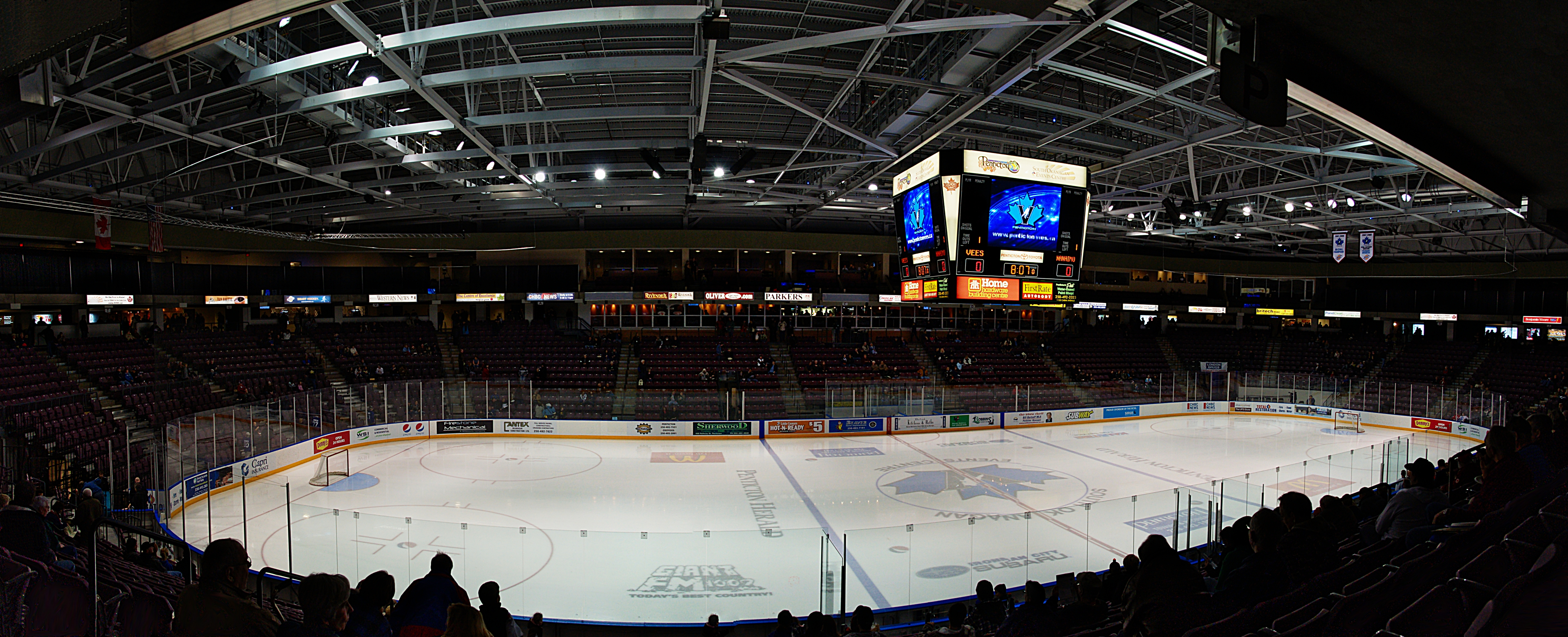
- Interactive map of South Okanagan Events Centre
- Address: 853 Eckhardt Avenue West; Penticton, British Columbia; V2A 9C4
- Coordinates: 49.494946°N 119.606545°W
- Owner: City of Penticton
- Operator: Global Spectrum
- Capacity: Ice hockey: 4,701; Concerts: 6,432

Construction
- Opened: 2008
- Cost: C$56.16 million

Tenants
- Penticton Vees (BCHL) (2008–2025); Penticton Vees (WHL) (2025–present)

The South Okanagan Events Centre (SOEC) is a 5,000-seat multi-purpose arena in Penticton, British Columbia, Canada. It is home to the Penticton Vees ice hockey team. The arena opened to the public in September 2008.

The centre hosted the 2018 Scotties Tournament of Hearts Canadian national women's curling championship from 27 January to 4 February.

== Description ==
The SOEC is part of the SOEC Complex (sometimes called the SOEC Campus), which includes the Penticton Trade and Convention Centre (PTCC), Memorial Arena and Cascades Casino. It is adjacent to the Penticton Community Centre, Cleland Theatre, Penticton Curling Club, and Bambino Field. These are part of a wider development project called the North Gateway, located at the northwest corner of the Penticton city limits, on the entry point to the city from the north.

The SOEC complex includes three of the city's four arenas: The SOEC with NHL-size ice (26 m × 61 m; 85 ft × 200 ft) expandable to Olympic-size (30 m × 61 m; 100 ft × 200 ft), the Okanagan Hockey School with NHL-size ice, and Memorial Arena (24 m × 55 m; 80 ft × 180 ft).

The SOEC opened in 2008, with a (approx.) 5,000-seat area. It faces British Columbia Highway 97 in Penticton.

The SOEC Complex is managed and operated by Oak View Group (OVG360), formerly Spectra and Global Spectrum Facility Management. It is owned by the City of Penticton.

== Finances ==
The original estimate for construction was $56 million, which had risen to $73 million after residents approved borrowing $40 million to cover construction in a 2006 referendum. The final cost was over $81 million. The city announced in February 2019 that the funds borrowed for construction had been paid in full.

The SOEC has always operated at a financial loss. Its annual operating deficit was reported in 2010 as $1.8 million. This fell to $1.5 million in 2011 and 2012 and approached $1 million in 2017. However, COVID-19 restrictions and rising expenses resulted in the annual operating deficit rising above $2 million in 2020 through 2024.

In 2024, the City of Penticton began exploring selling the naming rights to the SOEC.

Penticton and the SOEC were included in a 2018 marketing study of a dozen mid-sized Canadian cities which had constructed new minor-league hockey arenas. Like Penticton, most of the mid-sized cities owned and controlled operation of the facilities, unlike larger cities whose major-league franchises typically contribute to venue construction and operating costs. Debt repayment and operating expenses were often double the direct revenue generated by a facility; debt repayment for the SOEC was estimated at over $3.5 million in 2017. Operating the facilities at a financial loss, cities are thus subsidizing the events hosted in order to generate associated economic activity in the area, to raise the city's reputation for hosting events, and to promote the city's brand in association with the events. The study linked the success of facilities to the facilities' integration into the city's overall development strategies.

== Ice hockey ==
The SOEC's anchor tenant is the Penticton Vees ice hockey team, which advanced from the British Columbia Hockey League (BCHL) to the Western Hockey League (WHL) in 2025. It is also home to the British Columbia Hockey Hall of Fame and the Okanagan Hockey School, and has served as the main training camp for the Vancouver Canucks.

The centre is home to the Young Stars Rookie Tournament, which is an annual tournament featuring rookies and prospects from the Calgary Flames, Vancouver Canucks, Winnipeg Jets and Edmonton Oilers.
