= JP Hurlbert =

American ice hockey player (born 2008)

- Born: April 11, 2008 (age 18) Allen, Texas, U.S.
- Height: 6 ft 0 in (183 cm)
- Weight: 191 lb (87 kg; 13 st 9 lb)
- Position: Left wing
- Shoots: Right
- NCAA team: Michigan
- NHL draft: 23rd overall, 2026; Detroit Red Wings

Jeffrey Paul Hurlbert III (born April 11, 2008) is an American college ice hockey player who is a left wing for the Michigan Wolverines of the National Collegiate Athletic Association (NCAA). He was drafted 23rd overall by the Detroit Red Wings in the 2026 NHL entry draft.

== Playing career ==
Hurlbert played for the USA Hockey National Team Development Program during the 2024–25 season, and recorded 19 goals and 18 assists in 56 games with the under-17 team. He also recorded 16 goals and 15 assists in 34 games with the NTDP in the United States Hockey League (USHL).

Hurlbert was drafted 20th overall by the Kamloops Blazers in the 2023 U.S. Priority Draft. On August 26, 2025, he signed with the Blazers. He made his debut for the Blazers on September 20, 2025, against the Spokane Chiefs, and scored a hat-trick. He was subsequently named the WHL Rookie of the Week for the week ending September 21, 2025. The next week against the Seattle Thunderbirds, he recorded three goals and three assists in two games and was named the WHL Player of the Week for the week ending September 28, 2025. He began the season with 11 goals and 17 assists in 15 games to lead the WHL in scoring during the months of September and October. He recorded eight multi-point games, including six games with at least three points, and was subsequently named the WHL Player of the Month. During November 2025, he recorded eight goals and 12 assists in 12 games. He recorded seven multi-point games, and became the first WHL player to reach the 20 goal milestone this season. He was subsequently named the WHL Rookie of the Month. He finished the 2025–26 season with 42 goals and 55 assists in 68 regular season games, leading his team in goals, assists and points. His 97 points led all WHL rookies and tied for first across the entire Canadian Hockey League with Nikita Klepov of the Saginaw Spirit. Following the season he was named the Jim Piggott Memorial Trophy winner as the WHL's rookie of the year.

On June 26, 2026, Hurlbert was drafted in the first round, 23rd overall, by the Detroit Red Wings in the 2026 NHL entry draft.

Hurlbert committed to play college ice hockey for Michigan during the 2026–27 season.

== International play ==
Hurlbert represented the United States at the 2024 Winter Youth Olympics, and recorded four goals and three in four games and won a gold medal. During the semifinals against Canada, he scored the game-winning shootout goal to help the United States advance to the gold medal game. During the gold medal game against the Czech Republic, he recorded one goal and two assists, helping team USA win gold. In November 2024, he represented the United States at the 2024 World U-17 Hockey Challenge and recorded three assists in five games, as team USA finished in fourth place.

== Career statistics ==
=== Regular season and playoffs ===
			Regular season					Playoffs
Season	Team	League	GP	G	A	Pts	PIM	GP	G	A	Pts	PIM
2024–25	U.S. National Development Team	USHL	34	16	15	31	38	—	—	—	—	—
2025–26	Kamloops Blazers	WHL	68	42	55	97	45	4	1	2	3	6
WHL totals			68	42	55	97	45	4	1	2	3	6

=== International ===
Year	Team	Event	Result	GP	G	A	Pts	PIM
2024	United States	U17	4th	5	0	3	3	2
Junior totals				5	0	3	3	2

== Awards and honours ==
Award	Year	Ref
WHL
Jim Piggott Memorial Trophy	2026	

Awards and achievements
Preceded by Carter Bear	Detroit Red Wings first-round draft pick 2026	Succeeded by Incumbent
