= Daxon Rudolph =

Canadian ice hockey player (born 2008)

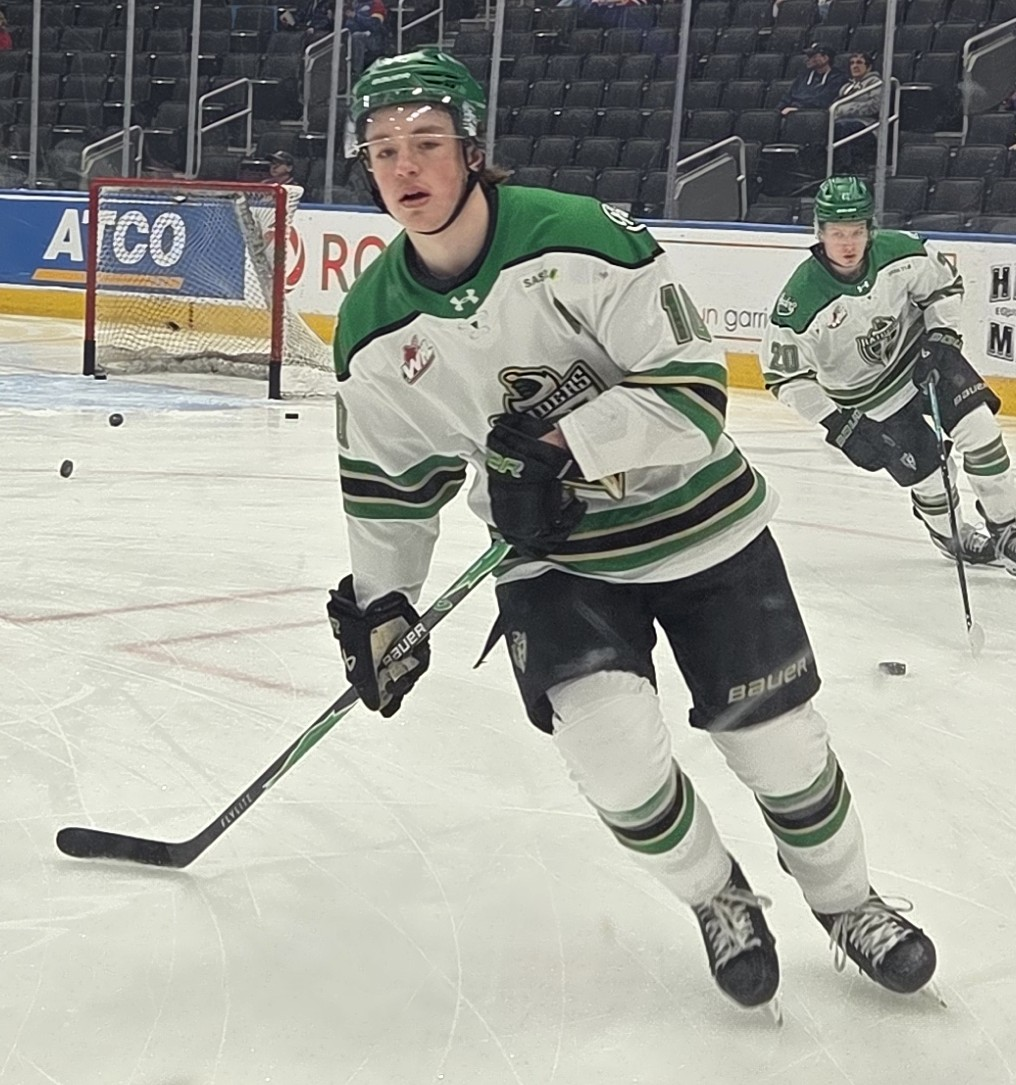
- Rudolph in 2026 with the Prince Albert Raiders
- Born: March 6, 2008 (age 18) Lacombe, Alberta, Canada
- Height: 6 ft 2 in (188 cm)
- Weight: 206 lb (93 kg; 14 st 10 lb)
- Position: Defence
- Shoots: Right
- WHL team: Prince Albert Raiders
- NHL draft: 4th overall, 2026; Buffalo Sabres

Daxon Rudolph (born March 6, 2008) is a Canadian ice hockey player who is a defenceman for the University of Denver of the National Collegiate Athletic Association (NCAA). He previously played for the Prince Albert Raiders of the Western Hockey League (WHL). He was drafted fourth overall by the Buffalo Sabres in the 2026 NHL entry draft.

== Playing career ==
Rudolph played ice hockey for the Red Deer Rebels under-15 AAA team during the 2021–22 season, posting two goals and 22 assists in 24 games played. The following season, he was a member of the Northern Alberta Xtreme U15 team in the Canadian Sport School Hockey League (CSSHL), notching 50 points in 30 games played. In 2023, he was selected first overall in the WHL bantam draft by the Prince Albert Raiders. Rudolph spent the 2023–24 season with the Xtreme's U18 team in the CSSHL, leading them to a record of 24–3–2–0–0–1 and an appearance in the league finals. He appeared in 28 regular-season games and was eighth in league scoring with 59 points, from 22 goals and 37 assists. He ranked second in team history for points in a single season by a defenceman and earned both CSSHL Freshman of the Year as well as co-league MVP honors.

Rudolph joined the Raiders for the 2024–25 season, appearing in 64 games while totalling seven goals and 34 assists. He ranked fifth among the league's rookies in assists, as well as fourth among rookie defencemen in points, and was a nominee for Western Hockey League Rookie of the Year.

Rudolph was selected by the Buffalo Sabres in the first round, with the fourth overall pick, of the 2026 NHL entry draft.

== International play ==
Medal record

Men's ice hockey

Representing Canada

World U18 Championship
Gold medal – first place	2025 United States	

Rudolph was a member of Canada's ice hockey team at the 2024 Winter Youth Olympics in South Korea, appearing in four games. Later that year, he won the gold medal with Canada White at the 2024 World U-17 Hockey Challenge. He appeared in one game for Canada at the 2025 IIHF World U18 Championships and won a gold medal. Rudolph was also a member of Canada's team at the 2025 Hlinka Gretzky Cup, helping them to the bronze medal while scoring four points in five games.

== Career statistics ==
Bold indicates led league

			Regular season					Playoffs
Season	Team	League	GP	G	A	Pts	PIM	GP	G	A	Pts	PIM
2024–25	Prince Albert Raiders	WHL	64	7	34	41	30	11	1	11	12	2
2025–26	Prince Albert Raiders	WHL	68	28	50	78	75	19	9	**18**	**27**	25
WHL totals			132	35	84	119	105	30	10	29	39	27

Awards and achievements
Preceded by Radim Mrtka	Buffalo Sabres first-round draft pick 2026	Succeeded by Ilia Morozov
