= Bryce Pickford =

Canadian ice hockey player (born 2006)

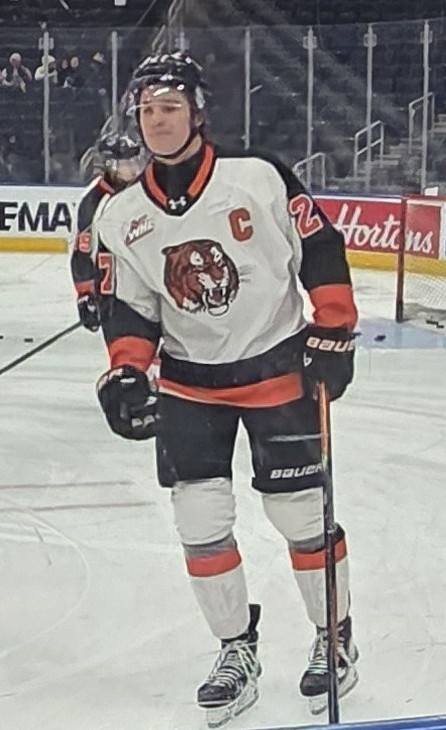
- Pickford with the Medicine Hat Tigers in March 2026
- Born: April 2, 2006 (age 20) Chauvin, Alberta, Canada
- Height: 6 ft 1 in (185 cm)
- Weight: 185 lb (84 kg; 13 st 3 lb)
- Position: Defence
- Shoots: Right
- NHL team (P) Cur. team: Montreal Canadiens; Laval Rocket (AHL)
- NHL draft: 81st overall, 2025; Montreal Canadiens

Bryce Pickford (born April 2, 2006) is a Canadian professional ice hockey player who is a defenceman for the Laval Rocket of the American Hockey League (AHL) while under contract to the Montreal Canadiens of the National Hockey League (NHL). He was selected in the third round, 81st overall, by the Canadiens in the 2025 NHL entry draft.

== Early life ==
Born in Chauvin, Alberta to parents Angela and Jim, his family previously lived in Leduc, where Pickford's mother worked as a nurse and his father owned a gym. Thereafter, Pickford grew up on their family farm, where he and his four siblings were homeschooled.

== Playing career ==
=== Minor ===
Initially spending two years not playing hockey as a teenager, Pickford opted to train full-time with his father and work on the family's farm. When asked about his time away from the sport, he offered: “All I did was wake up, chores, farm work, work out for four hours, eat, then more chores and go to the rink in Chauvin all day and night. That’s just the way we grew up. Working comes first. The two years I took off was a mental grind. I really didn’t see anybody. I just had long hair, and I didn’t want to go into town; I just wanted to get my work done.”

Following introduction to skills coach Adam Huxley, Pickford played one season of AA before attempting to move onto AAA distinction the next year. Despite securing a AAA roster spot, he decided that the commute to Lloydminster was too far and that the team wasn't a good personal fit. He instead joined the Wainwright Wainalta Polar Kings of the Alberta Elite Hockey League (AEHL) for the 2021–22 season, recording 53 points in 30 regular season games. Pickford likewise appeared in five games with the Wainwright Bisons of the North Eastern Alberta Junior B Hockey League (NEAJBHL) who were coached by the aforementioned Huxley at the time. The night before the Western Hockey League (WHL) Prospects Draft held in early December 2021, Huxley had invited various scouts to watch Pickford play a game with the Bisons in which he scored two goals. The following day, he was selected in the second round (38th overall) of proceedings by the Seattle Thunderbirds.

=== Junior ===
After making his major junior debut during the 2021–22 season versus the Spokane Chiefs on April 9, 2022, Pickford recorded his first career WHL goal four days later against the Vancouver Giants. Appearing in a further eight postseason games with the Thunderbirds, his team was ultimately defeated by the Edmonton Oil Kings in that year's league championship. For his part, Pickford initially skated as a forward through his first ten games played, before switching to defence.

The following season, his first spent solely in the WHL ranks, Pickford registered five goals and 12 assists in 54 regular season games. He also contributed two goals and one assist across 17 postseason games en route to the Thunderbirds capturing their second Ed Chynoweth Cup in franchise history. His team then had a strong showing at the ensuing Memorial Cup tournament, reaching the final.

With the Thunderbirds struggling over the course of the 2023–24 season, Pickford was traded to the Medicine Hat Tigers in exchange for various draft picks following conclusion of league play. Upon arrival, Tigers head coach and general manager Willie Desjardins spoke highly of Pickford, noting that “We needed to add depth to our backend with moves made today and going forward, he brings plenty of experience from past playoff runs that lead to championships, Bryce is a strong defender that will help us get that competitive edge we need going forward.”

In advance of the 2024–25 season, Pickford was announced as one of the Tigers' alternate captains. The subsequent campaign was highlighted by immense offensive output for Pickford, who recorded career-highs in both goals (20) and assists (27). His shift in playing style after being traded had been attributed to the Thunderbirds having several top NHL prospects on their roster during his time with the team, resulting in Pickford being pushed down the lineup and needing to focus mainly on defence. Overall, the Tigers made a deep playoff run, defeating the Spokane Chiefs in five games to capture the Ed Chynoweth Cup, the second of Pickford's WHL tenure. The team likewise reached the 2025 Memorial Cup final, losing to the Ontario Hockey League (OHL) champion London Knights by a final score of 4–1.

Serving as Tigers team captain for the 2025–26 season, Pickford managed to set additional career-highs in scoring, finishing the year tied with teammate Liam Ruck for second most goals leaguewide with 45, despite missing almost a month with an upper-body injury. Collectively, his goal count was the highest single-season total by a Canadian Hockey League (CHL) blueliner in the 21st century and the most in the WHL since Greg Hawgood who posted 48 in 1987–88. For his efforts, Pickford was chosen as recipient of the Bill Hunter Memorial Trophy and Four Broncos Memorial Trophy as WHL Defenceman and Player of the Year respectively, and was also named to the league's Eastern Conference First All-Star Team. In June 2026, he received the CHL Defenceman of the Year Award, becoming only the second player in Medicine Hat Tigers history to earn this distinction following Kris Russell.

=== Professional ===
Despite being eligible for selection in the 2024 NHL entry draft, Pickford went undrafted that year. He was later selected in the third round of the 2025 NHL entry draft by the Montreal Canadiens with the 81st overall pick, and signed a three-year, entry-level contract with the team on December 24, 2025.

After undergoing shoulder surgery in July 2026, Pickford was unable to partake in any on-ice sessions at the Canadiens' annual development camp, delaying his professional debut.

== Career statistics ==
=== Regular season and playoffs ===
			Regular season					Playoffs
Season	Team	League	GP	G	A	Pts	PIM	GP	G	A	Pts	PIM
2021–22	Seattle Thunderbirds	WHL	2	1	0	1	2	8	0	0	0	0
2022–23	Seattle Thunderbirds	WHL	54	5	12	17	50	17	2	1	3	2
2023–24	Seattle Thunderbirds	WHL	65	2	15	17	68	—	—	—	—	—
2024–25	Medicine Hat Tigers	WHL	48	20	27	47	65	18	13	11	24	12
2025–26	Medicine Hat Tigers	WHL	55	45	38	83	56	15	6	6	12	8
WHL totals			224	73	92	165	241	58	21	18	39	22

== Awards and honours ==
Award	Year	Ref
CHL
CHL Defenceman of the Year	2026	
First All-Star Team	2026	
WHL
Ed Chynoweth Cup champion	2023, 2025	
Four Broncos Memorial Trophy	2026	
Bill Hunter Memorial Trophy	2026	
Eastern Conference First All-Star Team	2026	

== Records ==
Medicine Hat Tigers:

- Most goals by a defenceman, single season: 45 (2025–26)
