= Four Broncos Memorial Trophy =

Western Hockey League Player of the Year award

The Four Broncos Memorial Trophy is awarded each year to the Western Hockey League's Player of the Year.

The trophy is named in honour of four members of the Swift Current Broncos who were killed on December 30, 1986 in the Swift Current Broncos bus crash: Trent Kresse, Scott Kruger, Chris Mantyka, and Brent Ruff. The accident that occurred as the team bus was en route to a game in Regina.

== Winners ==
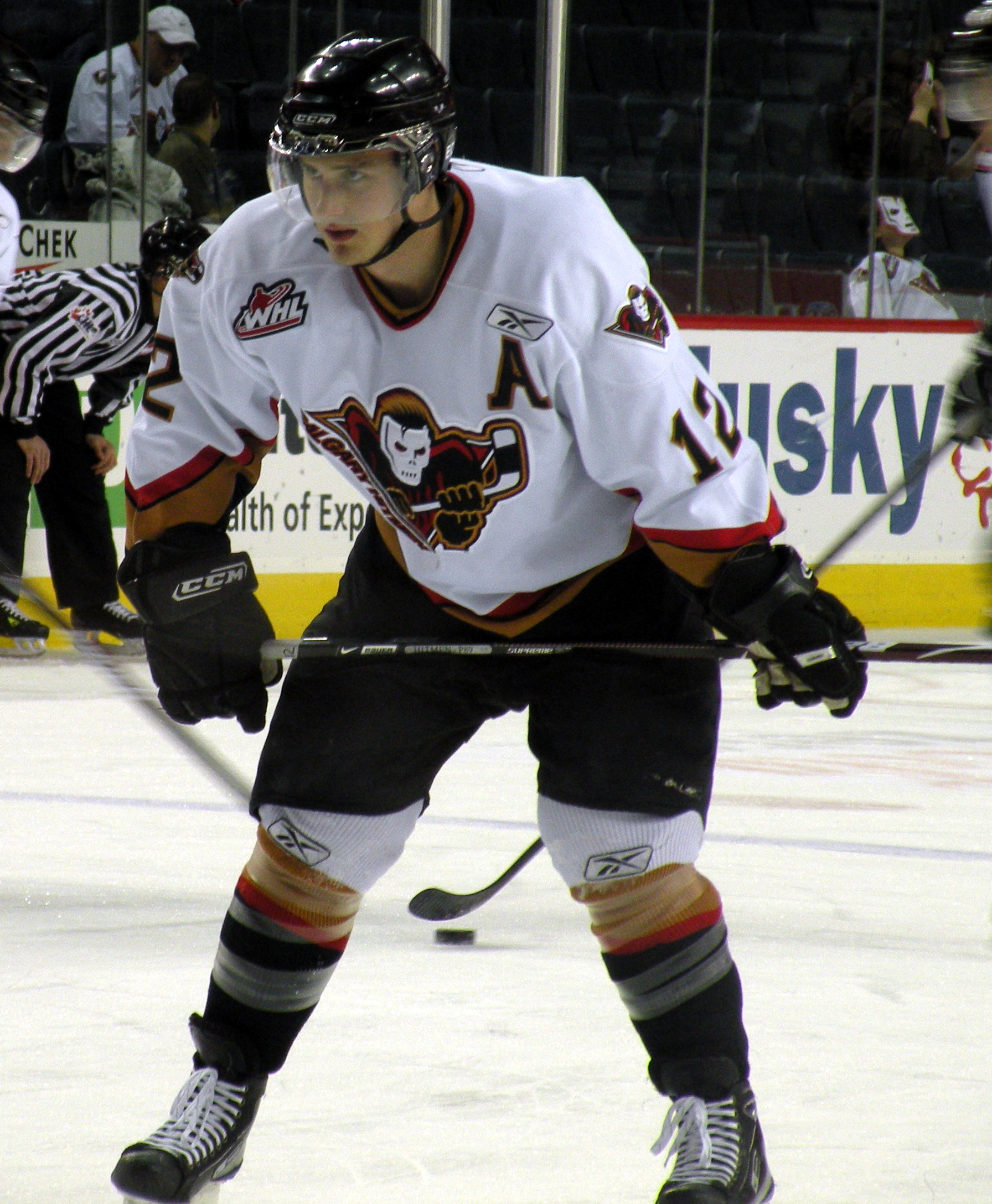
Brett Sonne, winner in 2008–09.

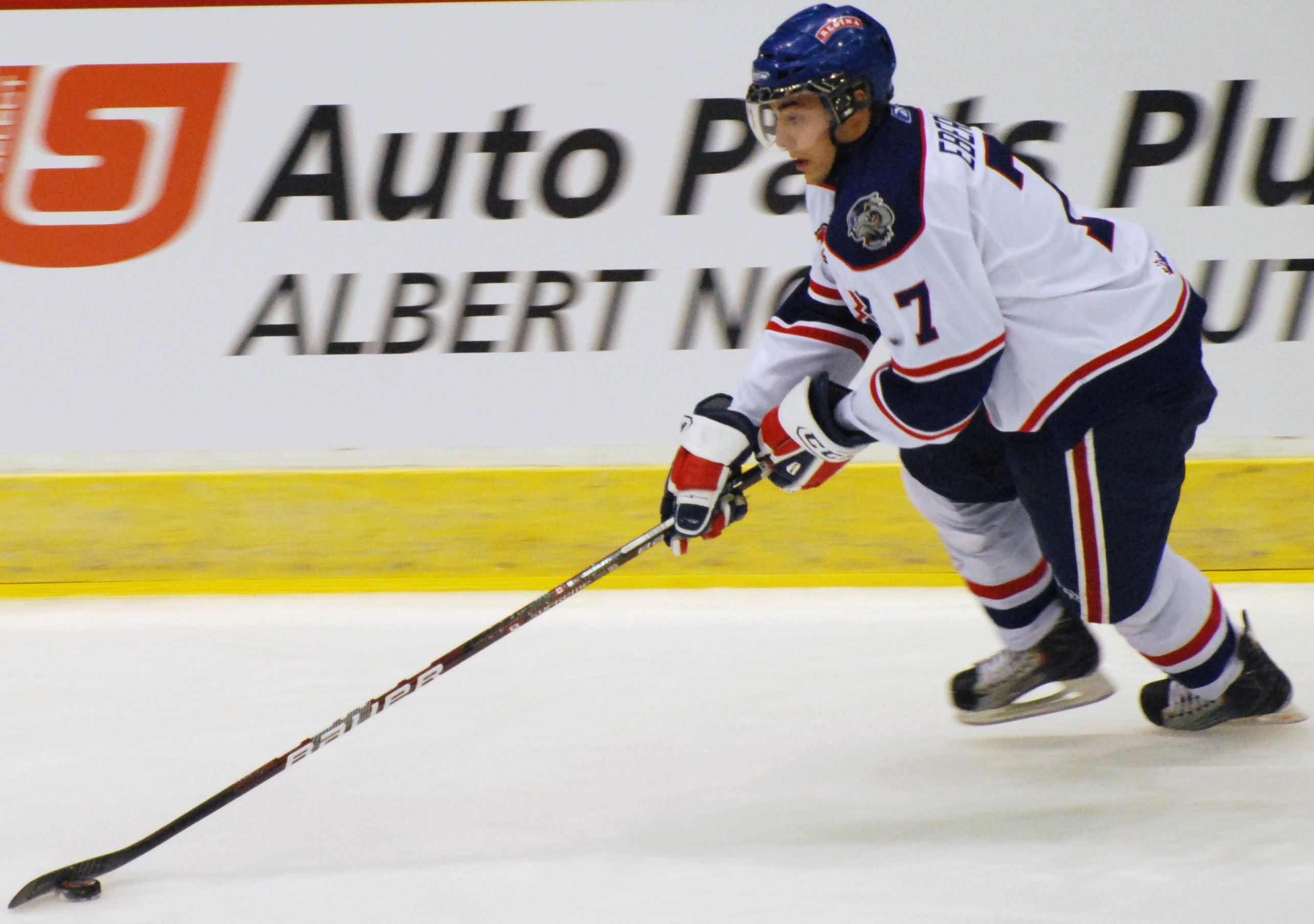
Jordan Eberle, winner in 2009–10.

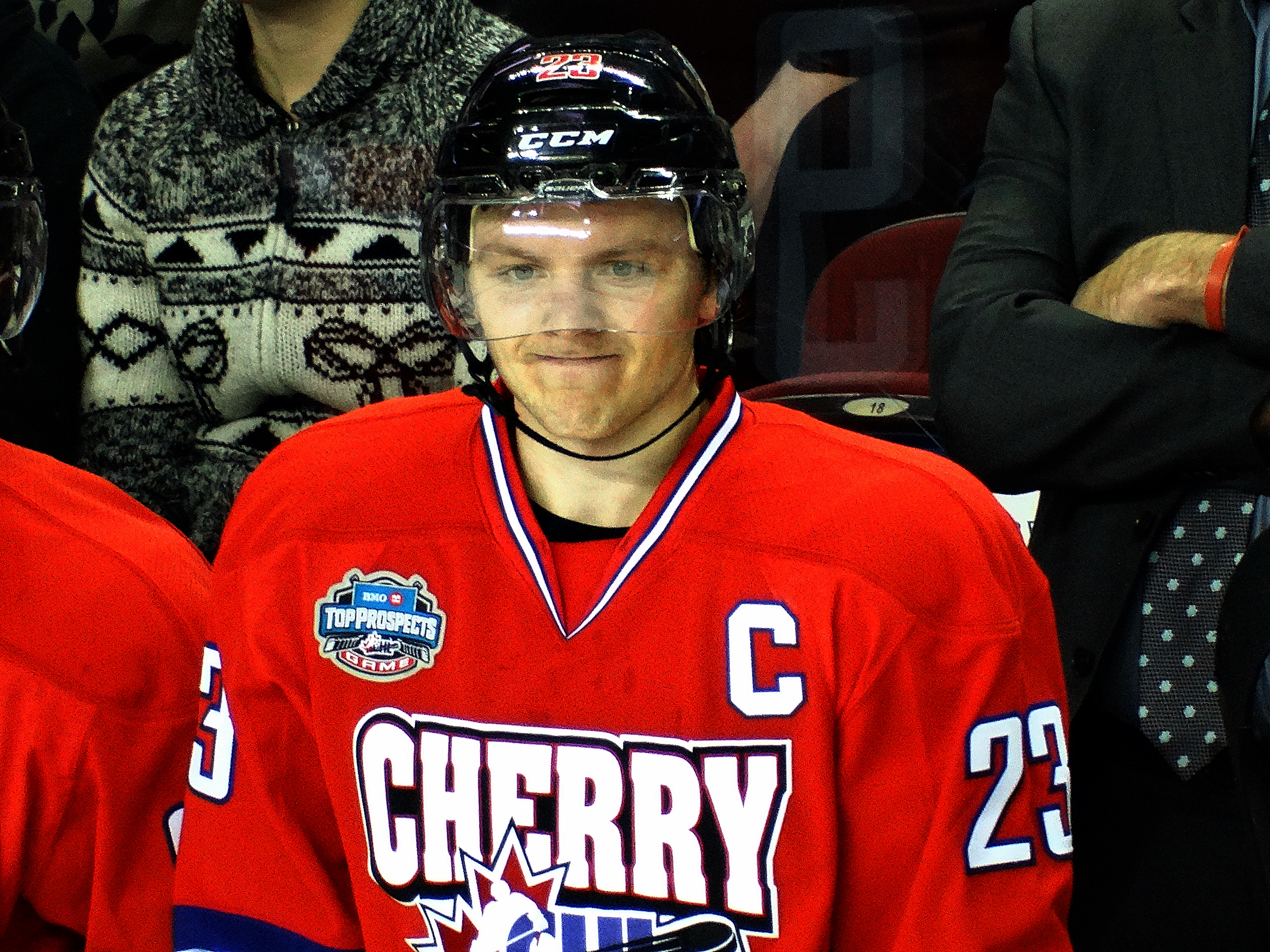
Sam Reinhart, winner in 2013–14.

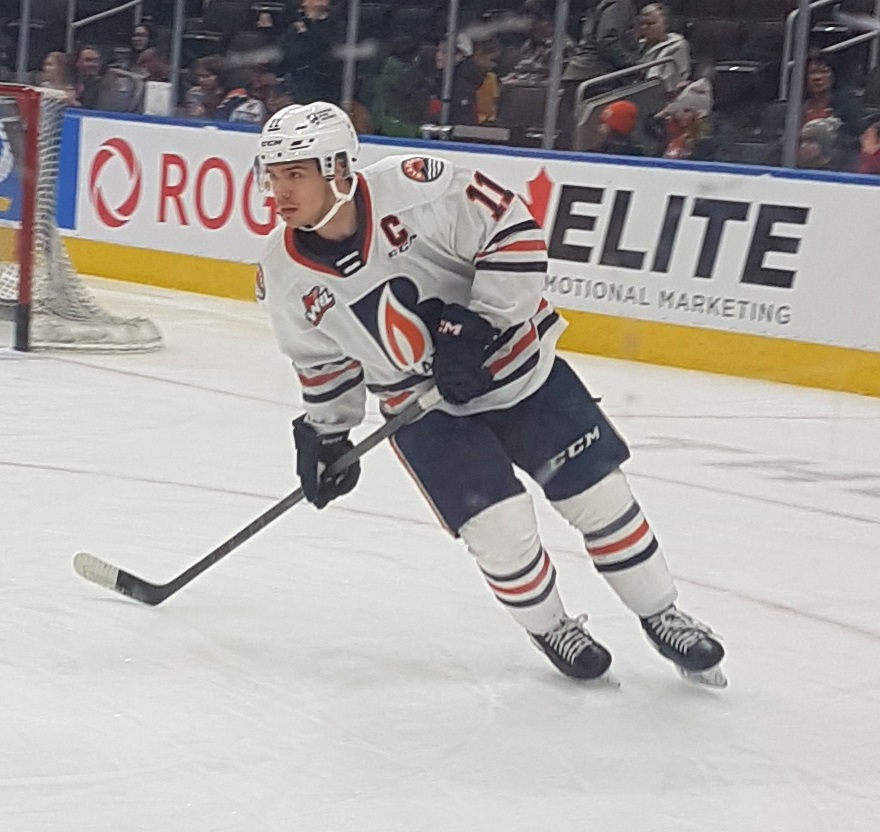
Logan Stankoven, winner in 2021–22.

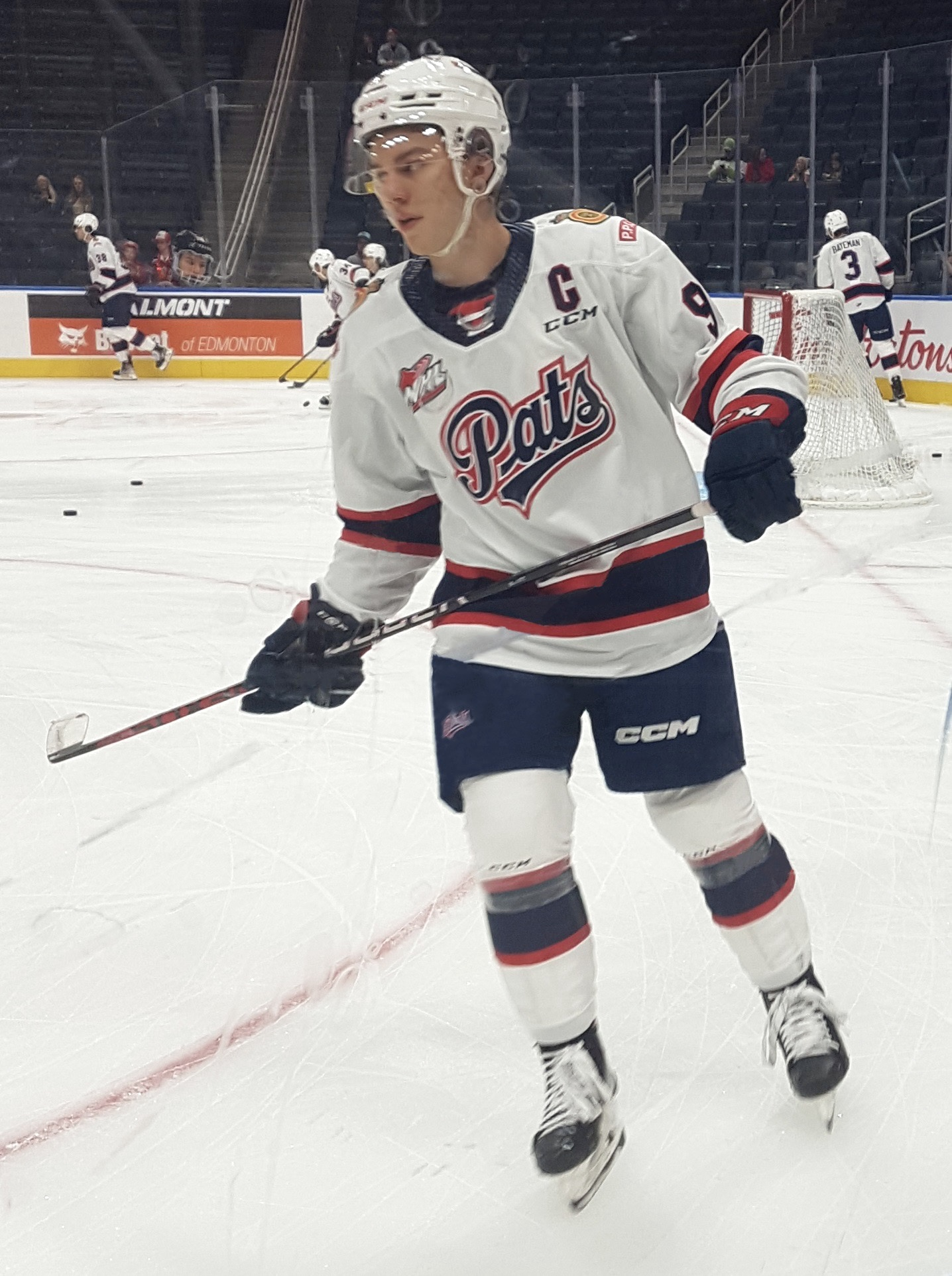
Connor Bedard, winner in 2022–23.

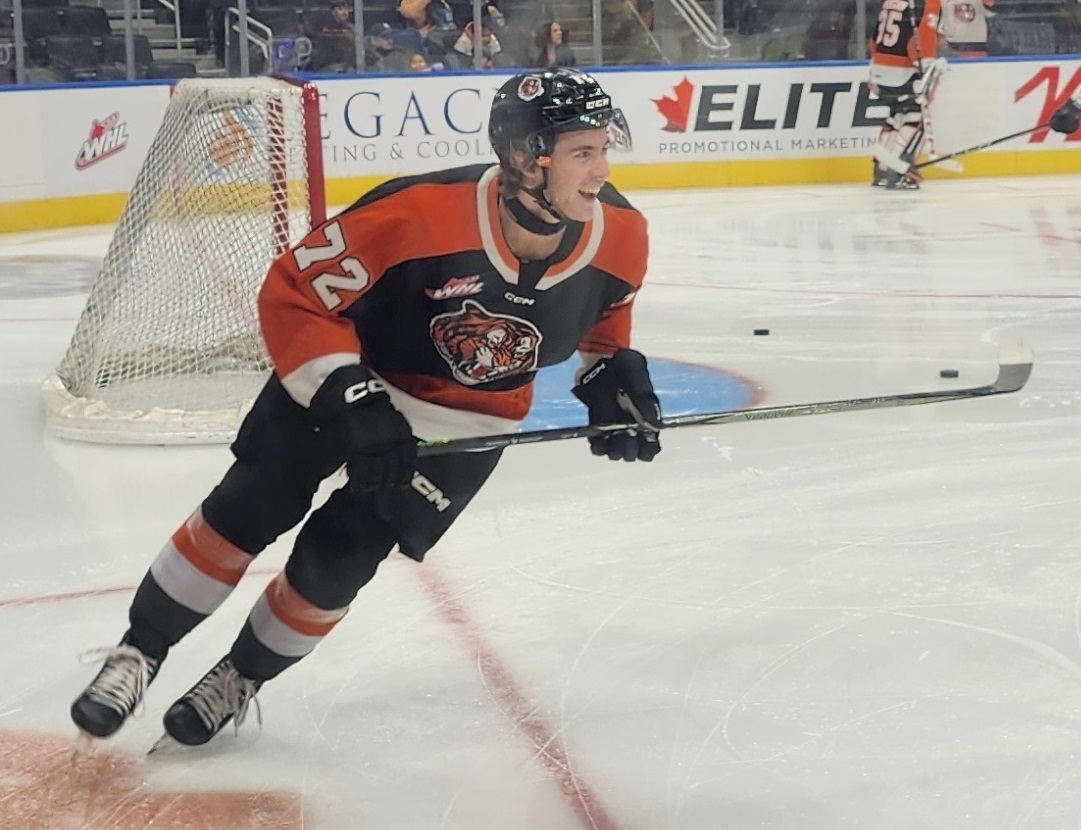
Gavin McKenna, winner in 2024–25.

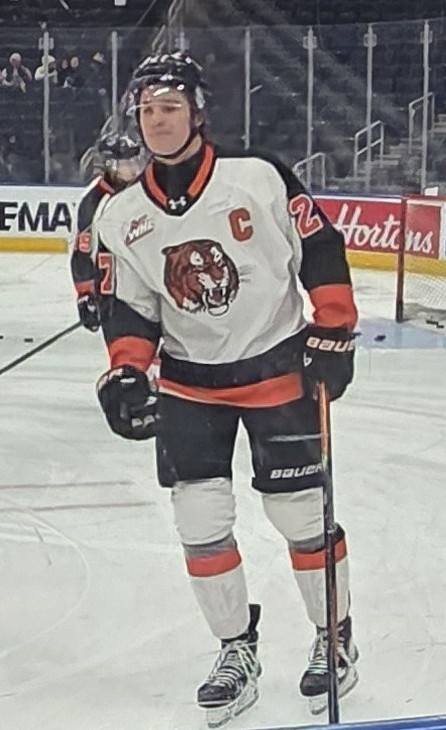
Bryce Pickford, winner in 2025–26.

List of winners of the Four Broncos Memorial Trophy.

Also named CHL Player of the Year

Season	Winner	Team	Goals	Assists	Points
1966–67	Gerry Pinder	Saskatoon Blades	78	62	140
1967–68	Jim Harrison	Estevan Bruins	32	43	75
1968–69	Bobby Clarke	Flin Flon Bombers	51	86	137
1969–70	Reggie Leach	Flin Flon Bombers	65	46	111
1970–71	Ed Dyck	Calgary Centennials	Goalkeeper		
1971–72	John Davidson	Calgary Centennials	Goalkeeper		
1972–73	Dennis Sobchuk	Regina Pats	67	80	147
1973–74	Ron Chipperfield	Brandon Wheat Kings	90	72	162
1974–75	Bryan Trottier	Lethbridge Broncos	46	98	144
1975–76	Bernie Federko	Saskatoon Blades	72	115	187
1976–77	Barry Beck	New Westminster Bruins	16	46	62
1977–78	Ryan Walter	Seattle Breakers	54	71	125
1978–79	Perry Turnbull	Portland Winter Hawks	75	43	118
1979–80	Doug Wickenheiser	Regina Pats	89	81	170
1980–81	Steve Tsujiura	Medicine Hat Tigers	55	84	139
1981–82	Mike Vernon	Calgary Wranglers	Goalkeeper		
1982–83	Mike Vernon	Calgary Wranglers	Goalkeeper		
1983–84	Ray Ferraro	Brandon Wheat Kings	108	84	192
1984–85	Cliff Ronning	New Westminster Bruins	89	108	197
1985–86^{1}	Rob Brown	Kamloops Blazers	58	115	173
1985–86^{1}	Manny Viveiros	Prince Albert Raiders	22	70	92
1986–87^{1}	Rob Brown	Kamloops Blazers	76	136	212
1986–87^{1}	Joe Sakic	Swift Current Broncos	60	73	133
1987–88	Joe Sakic	Swift Current Broncos	78	82	160
1988–89	Stu Barnes	Tri-City Americans	59	82	141
1989–90	Glen Goodall	Seattle Thunderbirds	76	87	163
1990–91	Ray Whitney	Spokane Chiefs	67	118	185
1991–92	Steve Konowalchuk	Portland Winter Hawks	51	53	104
1992–93	Jason Krywulak	Swift Current Broncos	81	81	162
1993–94	Sonny Mignacca	Medicine Hat Tigers	Goalkeeper		
1994–95	Marty Murray	Brandon Wheat Kings	40	88	128
1995–96	Jarome Iginla	Kamloops Blazers	63	73	136
1996–97	Peter Schaefer	Brandon Wheat Kings	49	74	123
1997–98	Sergei Varlamov	Swift Current Broncos	66	53	119
1998–99	Cody Rudkowsky	Seattle Thunderbirds	Goalkeeper		
1999–2000	Brad Moran	Calgary Hitmen	48	72	120
2000–01	Justin Mapletoft	Red Deer Rebels	43	77	120
2001–02	Dan Hamhuis	Prince George Cougars	10	50	60
2002–03	Josh Harding	Regina Pats	Goalkeeper		
2003–04	Cam Ward	Red Deer Rebels	Goalkeeper		
2004–05	Eric Fehr	Brandon Wheat Kings	59	52	111
2005–06	Justin Pogge	Calgary Hitmen	Goalkeeper		
2006–07	Kris Russell	Medicine Hat Tigers	32	37	69
2007–08	Karl Alzner	Calgary Hitmen	7	29	36
2008–09	Brett Sonne	Calgary Hitmen	48	52	100
2009–10	Jordan Eberle	Regina Pats	50	56	106
2010–11	Darcy Kuemper	Red Deer Rebels	Goalkeeper		
2011–12	Brendan Shinnimin	Tri-City Americans	58	76	134
2012–13	Adam Lowry	Swift Current Broncos	45	43	88
2013–14	Sam Reinhart	Kootenay Ice	36	69	105
2014–15	Oliver Bjorkstrand	Portland Winterhawks	63	55	118
2015–16	Dryden Hunt	Moose Jaw Warriors	58	58	116
2016–17	Sam Steel	Regina Pats	50	81	131
2017–18	Carter Hart	Everett Silvertips	Goalkeeper		
2018–19	Joachim Blichfeld	Portland Winterhawks	53	61	114
2019–20	Adam Beckman	Spokane Chiefs	48	59	107
2020–21	Peyton Krebs	Winnipeg Ice	13	30	43
2021–22	Logan Stankoven	Kamloops Blazers	45	59	104
2022–23	Connor Bedard	Regina Pats	71	72	143
2023–24	Jagger Firkus	Moose Jaw Warriors	61	65	126
2024–25	Gavin McKenna	Medicine Hat Tigers	41	88	129
2025-26	Bryce Pickford	Medicine Hat Tigers	45	38	83

1. The WHL handed out separate awards for the East and West divisions.

== See also ==
- Red Tilson Trophy - Ontario Hockey League Player of the Year
- Michel Brière Memorial Trophy - Quebec Major Junior Hockey League Player of the Year
- List of Canadian Hockey League awards
