= The Book =

The Book may refer to:

== Religious texts ==
- The Bible, especially a Tyndale House edition of the New Living Translation published as "The Book"
- The Qur’ān (Arabic: القرآن al-qur'ān, literally "the recitation")
- The second part of The Revelation of Arès, a publication of a 20th-century religious movement founded by Michel Potay

== Music ==
- The Book (album) by Root, 1999
- The Book (D-Sisive EP), 2008
- The Book (Yoasobi EP), 2021

== In fiction ==
- The Theory and Practice of Oligarchical Collectivism, a fictional book written by Emmanuel Goldstein that serves as a major plot element in George Orwell's novel Nineteen Eighty-Four
- The Hitchhiker's Guide to the Galaxy (fictional), often referred to simply as "the book" within its namesake series
- The Book (Time Warp Trio), a fictional item from the book Time Warp Trio and television series The Time Warp Trio

== Other uses ==
- Paul Erdős's concept of "The Book", in which God kept the best proof of each mathematical theorem, and which inspired Proofs from THE BOOK
- The Book (short story), an unfinished, fragmentary short story by H. P. Lovecraft
- The Book: On the Taboo Against Knowing Who You Are, a 1966 work by Alan Watts
- The Book of Tasty and Healthy Food, a Soviet-era government-sponsored cookbook
- "The Book", a song by King Gizzard and the Lizard Wizard on Sketches of Brunswick East
- "The Book" (Good Omens), a 2019 television episode

== See also ==
- Book (disambiguation)
- The Books, an American music group
