= Good book =

Good Book, good books or The Good Book may refer to:

- The Bible
- The Good Book Company, a Christian publishing company
- The Good Book Press, a fine press publishing company by artists Peter and Donna Thomas
- The Good Book (album), a 1971 album by Melanie
- The Good Book (book), by A. C. Grayling, 2011 anthology of non-religious philosophy
- GoodBooks, an English indie rock band
- The Good Book (Vice Principals), an episode of the American TV series Vice Principals

== See also ==
- Book (disambiguation)
