= Brock Cripps =

Canadian ice hockey player (born 2009)

- Born: July 23, 2009 (age 17) Victoria, British Columbia, Canada
- Height: 5 ft 11 in (180 cm)
- Weight: 170 lb (77 kg; 12 st 2 lb)
- Position: Defence
- Shoots: Right
- WHL team: Prince Albert Raiders
- NHL draft: Eligible 2027

Brock Cripps (born July 23, 2009) is a Canadian junior ice hockey player for the Prince Albert Raiders of the Western Hockey League (WHL) He is considered a top prospect eligible for the 2027 NHL entry draft.

== Playing career ==
Cripps began his career with St. George's School prep team. During the 2023–24 season, with the U15 team, he led the league in scoring with 25 goals and 45 assists in 26 regular season games. Following the season he was named the CSSHL U15 Prep MVP and Top Defenceman. He holds the St. George's School career U15 prep defenseman record for assists (79) and points (108). During the 2024–25 season, with the U18 team, he led all defencemen in scoring with seven goals and 39 assists in 30 games. Following the season he was named the CSSHL U18 Prep Top Defenceman.

On May 9, 2024, Cripps was drafted second overall by the Prince Albert Raiders in the 2024 WHL Prospects Draft. On May 14, 2024, he signed a WHL Scholarship and Development contract with the Raiders. During the 2025–26 season, in his first full year with the Raiders, he recorded six goals and 31 assists in 62 regular season games. During the playoffs he recorded four goals and 17 assists in 20 games.

== International play ==
Cripps represented Canada at the 2026 Hlinka Gretzky Cup where he recorded one goal and five assists in five games and won a gold medal.

== Personal life ==
Cripps has two older brothers, Brady and Boston. Brady played soccer for the Vancouver Island Wave, while Boston, plays ice hockey for the Nanaimo Buccaneers.

== Career statistics ==
=== Regular season and playoffs ===
| | | | Regular season | | | | | Playoffs |
| Season | Team | League | GP | G | A | Pts | PIM | GP | G | A | Pts | PIM |
|---|---|---|---|---|---|---|---|---|---|---|---|---|
| 2024–25 | Prince Albert Raiders | WHL | 4 | 0 | 1 | 1 | 2 | — | — | — | — | — |
| 2025–26 | Prince Albert Raiders | WHL | 62 | 6 | 31 | 37 | 18 | 20 | 4 | 17 | 21 | 9 |
| WHL totals | | | 66 | 6 | 32 | 38 | 20 | 20 | 4 | 17 | 21 | 9 |

=== International ===
| Year | Team | Event | Result | GP | G | A | Pts | PIM |
|---|---|---|---|---|---|---|---|---|
| 2026 | Canada | HG18 | 1st place, gold medalist(s) | 5 | 1 | 5 | 6 | 0 |
| Junior totals | | | | 5 | 1 | 5 | 6 | 0 |
