= Jaxon Jacobson =

Canadian ice hockey player (born 2008)

- Born: December 11, 2008 (age 17) Brandon, Manitoba, Canada
- Height: 5 ft 10 in (178 cm)
- Weight: 182 lb (83 kg; 13 st 0 lb)
- Position: Forward
- Shoots: Left
- WHL team: Brandon Wheat Kings
- NHL draft: Eligible 2027

Jaxon Jacobson (born December 11, 2008) is a Canadian junior ice hockey forward for the Brandon Wheat Kings of the Western Hockey League (WHL). He is considered a top prospect eligible for the 2027 NHL entry draft.

Jaxon's father Jared purchased the Brandon Wheat Kings the year before the WHL Bantam Draft that Jaxon was eligible for. There was no doubt amongst league officials and scouts that Jaxon was going to be drafted by the Wheat Kings in the first round.

== Playing career ==
Jacobson was selected by the Brandon Wheat Kings in the first round, fifth overall in the 2023 WHL Prospects Draft. At the age of 14, Jacobson was the youngest player to ever debut for the Wheat Kings. In his debut with the Wheat Kings, Jacobson scored two goals in a 5–4 shootout win.

In 2024, Jacobson was named the CEHL's 2023–24 player of the year.

== Career statistics ==
			Regular season					Playoffs
Season	Team	League	GP	G	A	Pts	PIM	GP	G	A	Pts	PIM
2023–24	Brandon Wheat Kings	WHL	7	4	2	6	4	—	—	—	—	—
2024–25	Brandon Wheat Kings	WHL	51	15	29	44	40	5	0	1	1	2
2025–26	Brandon Wheat Kings	WHL	63	25	60	85	32	4	1	3	4	0
WHL totals			121	44	91	135	76	9	1	4	5	2
