= Book (surname) =

Book is an English surname. Notable people with the surname include:

- Anna Book (born 1970), Swedish singer
- Asher Book (born 1988), American dancer, singer-songwriter and actor
- Clifford H. Book (1895–1954), lawyer in Melbourne, Australia
- Dan Book (born 1983), American songwriter and record producer
- Ed Book (born 1970), New Zealand basketball player
- Ian Book (born 1998), American football player
- Kim Book (born 1946), English footballer and manager
- Lauren Book (born 1984), American politician
- Nils-Ole Book (born 1986), German footballer
- Raymond Book (1925–2018), American politician
- Steve Book (born 1969), English footballer
- Todd Book (born 1968), American politician
- Tony Book (1934–2025), English footballer and manager
