= Penticton Vees (WHL) =

Western Hockey League franchise

- City: Penticton, British Columbia
- League: Western Hockey League
- Conference: Western
- Division: B.C.
- Founded: 2025
- Home arena: South Okanagan Events Centre
- Colours: Black, navy blue, mountain blue and white
- Owners: Graham Fraser; Mark Scheifele; Mike Richter; Joe Walters; Gord Kovacik
- General manager: Fred Harbinson
- Head coach: Fred Harbinson
- Captain: Nolan Stevenson
- Website: chl.ca/whl-vees

Current uniform

The Penticton Vees are a Junior ice hockey franchise that debuted in the Western Hockey League (WHL) in the 2025–26 WHL season as an expansion team. The team plays its home games in the South Okanagan Events Centre in Penticton as part of the B.C. Division of the Western Conference.

== Organization ==
The franchise is operated by part-owner Graham Fraser, who also is the majority owner of the BCHL Penticton Vees since June 2008. The other ownership partners are Mark Scheifele, Mike Richter, Joe Walters and Gord Kovacik. The team planned to have the same operations staff as the BCHL franchise, including head coach and general manager Fred Harbinson.

The team employs a staff of 11 scouts assigned to specific regions in Western Canada and the United States, including: Manitoba, Saskatchewan, Alberta, Southern Alberta, Mainland British Columbia, Vancouver Island, Minnesota and California.

== Arena ==
The South Okanagan Events Centre is a 95,000-square-foot multi-purpose facility with 3 ice rinks, 5,000 seats and 27 luxury seats. It opened in 2008 and is owned by the City of Penticton and managed by Oak View Group.

== History ==
The team traces its history to 1961 when the Penticton Jr. Vees were a founding member of the Okanagan-Mainline Junior "A" Hockey League (OMJHL). Before joining the WHL as an expansion team in 2025, the Penticton Vees had been the name of a British Columbia Hockey League (BCHL) franchise from 2004 to 2025. With the establishment of the WHL franchise, the BCHL franchise was expected to relocate to another city. The name "Vees" is a reference to the Victory, Valiant, and Vidette varieties of peaches grown in the Okanagan Valley.

== Season-by-season record ==
Note: GP = Games played, W = Wins, L = Losses, OTL = Overtime losses, SOL = Shootout losses, GF = Goals for, GA = Goals against

Season	GP	W	L	OTL	SOL	GF	GA	Points	Finish	Playoffs
2025–26	68	44	14	6	4	268	188	98	1st B.C.	Lost Western Conference final

=== WHL Championship history ===
- Regular season division titles (1): 2025–26

== Sources ==
- Powrie, Chelsea (24 March 2025). "'New chapter, new legacy': Penticton Vees celebrate moving up to the Western Hockey League - Penticton News". castanet.net.
- Lypka, Ben (24 March 2025). "Chilliwack receiving WHL franchise for 2026-27 season". The Chilliwack Progress. Black Press Media.
- Lypka, Ben (25 March 2025). "WHL apologizes for past Chilliwack mistakes, pledges future loyalty". The Chilliwack Progress. Black Press Media.
- Lypka, Ben (27 March 2025). "Chilliwack mayor on WHL: 'I don't think it's the right move'". The Chilliwack Progress. Black Press Media.
- Lypka, Ben (28 March 2025). "Chilliwack mayor apologizes for 'disrespect' shown to the WHL". The Chilliwack Progress. Black Press Media.
- "Kelowna Rockets to pick third, Penticton Vees fourth in 2025 WHL draft". Vernon Matters. Pattison Media. 11 April 2025.
- "Penticton Vees expand to Western Hockey League". Global News. Corus Entertainment. The Canadian Press. 24 March 2025.
- Shire, Taylor (7 April 2025). "WHL draft lottery set for Thursday: Here's what you need to know". leaderpost.com. Postmedia.
- Ewen, Steve (13 February 2025). "Several sources have Penticton Vees leaving BCHL to join WHL as expansion team next season". The Province. Postmedia.
- "Vees Reveal New Brand Logo". pentictonvees.ca (Press release). Penticton, B.C. 26 August 2022.
- Richardson, Casey (26 August 2022). "Penticton Vees reveal new logo and team colours - BCHL". castanet.net.
- Powrie, Chelsea (22 April 2025). "Penticton Vees name new head of scouting ahead of first WHL season". castanet.net.
- Lockhart, Logan (22 April 2025). "WHL-bound Penticton Vees appoint new director of scouting". Penticton Western News. Black Press Media.
- Lockhart, Logan (25 April 2025). "Rules, regulations set for Penticton Vees WHL expansion draft". Penticton Western News. Black Press Media.
- Ewen, Steve (5 May 2025). "Busy Vees: Penticton playing in BCHL semifinals, making WHL expansion draft picks this week". The Province. Postmedia.
- Richardson, Casey (7 May 2025). "Penticton Vees unveil their 22 players for the 2025 WHL Expansion Draft - WHL". castanet.net.
- Rocca, Taylor (7 May 2025). "Penticton Vees acquire 22 players in 2025 WHL Expansion Draft proceedings". Western Hockey League.
- Palmer, Randy (7 May 2025). "Plenty of Saskatchewan players headed west as Penticton Vees WHL expansion draft announced". MooseJawToday.com. Harvard Media.
- Lockhart, Logan (7 May 2025). "Penticton Vees acquire 22 players in WHL expansion draft". Penticton Western News. Black Press Media.
- Lockhart, Logan (8 May 2025). "'Super special': Penticton makes history with 1st WHL draft pick". Nelson Star. Black Press Media.
- Vaski, Corvin (8 May 2025). "Vees head to Alberta for first-ever WHL draft pick". PentictonNow.
- "Meet Penticton's first-ever top draft pick". Penticton Herald. 8 May 2025.
- McIntosh, Sean (8 May 2025). "Penticton Vees select Doogan Pederson from Red Deer Rebels in 2025 WHL Expansion Draft". Red Deer Advocate. Black Press Media.
- "Laurie and Warriors part ways: Joins WHL's Penticton Vees". AM 1150. Vista Radio. 27 May 2025.
- Duncan, Josh (4 June 2025). "Penticton Vees to open inaugural WHL season in Victoria, debut at home against Kelowna". PentictonNow.
- DeMille, Matthew (5 June 2025). "Vees complete 2025 WHL Expansion Draft with Medicine Hat selection". Western Hockey League. Canadian Hockey League.
- Powrie, Chelsea (8 August 2025). "'Peach pie in a bottle': Limited hot sauce celebrates Penticton Vees' entry to WHL". castanet.net.
