= Book, Louisiana =

Human settlement in the United States

Coordinates: 31°20′15″N 91°52′17″W

Book is an unincorporated community in Catahoula Parish, Louisiana, United States.

== History ==
Book was named for a family of pioneer settlers which included the first postmaster.
