= Booking =

Booking may refer to:

- Making an appointment for a meeting or gathering, as part of event planning/scheduling
- The intake or admission process into a prison or psychiatric facility
- Booking (manhwa), a Korean comics anthology magazine published by Haksan
- Booking (professional wrestling), the laying out of the plot before a professional wrestling match
- An accounting system a.k.a. double-entry bookkeeping system
- Booking (clubbing), the practise of forced socialisation in South Korean clubs
- Booking Holdings, American company
- Booking.com, a website for arranging hotel reservations
- Booking, scheduling services performed by a talent agent
- In professional sports, the noting of a player's name in a referee's book, the player having been shown a penalty card

== See also ==
- Book (disambiguation)
