= Book (disambiguation) =

A book is a written work of substantial length by one or more authors. They can be distributed in various forms including as printed books, audiobooks, and electronic books (ebooks). For structural divisions within longer works, such as Books I-XII of the Aeneid or the books of the Bible, see Chapter (books) § Book-like.

Book or Books may also refer to:

== Objects ==
- Address book, database used for storing contact details
- Autograph book, album for collecting autographs
- Book safe, a hollowed-out book or container designed to imitate a real book
- Commonplace book, personal notebooks used to compile any information the owner finds interesting or useful
- Logbook, a record used to record states, events, or conditions applicable to complex machines or the personnel who operate them
- Notebook, Book for writing, drawing, scrapbooking
- Phone book, a list of phone numbers of people and businesses
- Sketchbook, a book or pad with blank pages for sketching

== Places ==
- Book, Louisiana, a community in the United States
- Book's Covered Bridge, also known as Kaufman Covered Bridge, an historic wooden bridge in Jackson Township, Pennsylvania

== People with the name ==
- Book (surname)
- Bob Books (American football) (1903–1958), American football player

== Arts, entertainment, and media ==
=== Fictional characters ===
- Shepherd Book, a character in the Firefly television series and the following film, Serenity
- Book, a character from Battle for Dream Island, an animated web series
- J. B. Books, a character in the film The Shootist

=== Music ===
- The Books, an American band
- Books (EP), a 2004 Extended Play music recording by Belle & Sebastian
- "Book", a 2015 song by Chon from Grow
- Book (album), a 2021 album by They Might Be Giants

=== Other arts, entertainment, and media ===
- Book (musical theatre), the spoken dialogue of a stage musical
- Book, a 1997 memoir by Whoopi Goldberg
- "Book 'em, Danno!", Det. Capt. Steve McGarrett's catchphrase on the Hawaii Five-O (1968 TV series)
- "Books", an episode from Ben & Holly's Little Kingdom

== Other uses ==
- Book (graph theory), a split graph consisting of p triangles sharing a common edge
- Book (wagering), a set of odds for the possible outcomes in betting
- Book, a synonym for the act of making a reservation with a hospitality vendor (e.g., a table reservation or travel reservation) or entertainment act
- Book, to arrest someone, i.e., apprehend and take them into custody
- Book lung, a respiratory organ in some arachnids
- Book of Life, the book in which God, on Rosh Hashana, writes the names of those who will live another year
- Book wallpaper, in wallpaper installation, the step that activates the paste
- Bookkeeping, books, accounting and financial records
- Bookworm, a lover of books

== See also ==
- Bookie
- Booking (disambiguation)
- Cook the Books (TV program)
- Cook the Books
- Good book (disambiguation)
- The Book (disambiguation)
