= 1992–93 USHL season =

- League: United States Hockey League
- Sport: Ice hockey
- Duration: Regular season September 1992 – March 1993; Postseason; March – April 1993
- Games: 48
- Teams: 10

Regular season
- Anderson Cup: Omaha Lancers

Clark Cup Playoffs
- Finals champions: Omaha Lancers
- Runners-up: Dubuque Fighting Saints

USHL seasons
- ← 1991–92 1993–94 →

The 1992–93 USHL season was the 14th season of the United States Hockey League as an all-junior league. The regular season began in September 1992 and concluded in March 1993. The Omaha Lancers won the Anderson Cup as regular season champions. The Omaha Lancers also defeated the Dubuque Fighting Saints 3 games to 1 for the Clark Cup.

== Member changes ==
None

== Regular season ==
Final standings

Note: GP = Games played; W = Wins; L = Losses; T = Ties; OTL = Overtime losses; GF = Goals for; GA = Goals against; PTS = Points; x = clinched playoff berth; y = clinched league title

Team	GP	W	L	T	OTL	Pts	GF	GA
xy – Omaha Lancers	48	35	9	0	4	74	255	159
x – Des Moines Buccaneers	48	33	11	4	0	70	231	171
x – Dubuque Fighting Saints	48	30	11	5	2	67	229	163
x – Thunder Bay Flyers	48	31	14	2	1	65	243	163
x – St. Paul Vulcans	48	26	19	2	1	55	212	201
x – Rochester Mustangs	48	20	25	2	1	43	168	202
x – Waterloo Black Hawks	48	17	24	3	4	41	155	205
x – Sioux City Musketeers	48	15	25	4	4	38	212	237
North Iowa Huskies	48	14	28	2	4	34	161	227
Wisconsin Capitols	48	6	39	2	1	15	135	273

== Clark Cup playoffs ==
Teams were reseeded after the quarterfinal round.

Quarterfinal (Best-of-5)
1	Omaha Lancers	3
8	Sioux City Musketeers	1
2	Des Moines Buccaneers	3
7	Waterloo Black Hawks	0
3	Dubuque Fighting Saints	3
6	Rochester Mustangs	1
4	Thunder Bay Flyers	3
5	St. Paul Vulcans	2

Semifinal (Best-of-5)
1	Omaha Lancers	3
4	Thunder Bay Flyers	1
2	Des Moines Buccaneers	0
3	Dubuque Fighting Saints	3

Championship (Best-of-5)
1	Omaha Lancers	3
3	Dubuque Fighting Saints	1

Note: * denotes overtime period(s)

== Awards ==
Award	Recipient	Team
Player of the Year	Eric Rud	Des Moines Buccaneers
Forward of the Year	Neil Donovan	Omaha Lancers
Defenseman of the Year	Eric Rud	Des Moines Buccaneers
Goaltender of the Year	Bob Petrie	Omaha Lancers
Coach of the Year	Mike Guentzel	Omaha Lancers
General Manager of the Year	Bob Ferguson	Des Moines Buccaneers
