= 1991–92 USHL season =

- League: United States Hockey League
- Sport: Ice hockey
- Duration: Regular season September 1991 – March 1992; Postseason; March – April 1992
- Games: 48
- Teams: 10

Regular season
- Anderson Cup: Thunder Bay Flyers

Clark Cup Playoffs
- Finals champions: Des Moines Buccaneers
- Runners-up: Dubuque Fighting Saints

USHL seasons
- ← 1990–91 1992–93 →

The 1991–92 USHL season was the 13th season of the United States Hockey League as an all-junior league. The regular season began in September 1991 and concluded in March 1992. The Thunder Bay Flyers won the Anderson Cup as regular season champions. The Des Moines Buccaneers defeated the Dubuque Fighting Saints 3 games to 1 for the Clark Cup.

== Member changes ==
- The Madison Capitols rebranded as the Wisconsin Capitols

== Regular season ==
Final standings

Note: GP = Games played; W = Wins; L = Losses; T = Ties; OTL = Overtime losses; GF = Goals for; GA = Goals against; PTS = Points; x = clinched playoff berth; y = clinched league title

Team	GP	W	L	T	OTL	Pts	GF	GA
xy – Thunder Bay Flyers	48	36	10	1	1	74	265	173
x – Des Moines Buccaneers	48	35	10	2	1	73	291	157
x – St. Paul Vulcans	48	31	12	2	3	67	255	179
x – Dubuque Fighting Saints	48	27	17	2	2	58	256	179
x – Omaha Lancers	48	22	22	1	3	48	222	236
x – Waterloo Black Hawks	48	21	23	2	2	46	253	286
x – Sioux City Musketeers	48	19	26	1	2	41	217	256
x – Rochester Mustangs	48	17	25	2	4	40	185	214
North Iowa Huskies	48	14	32	1	1	30	154	296
Wisconsin Capitols	48	11	33	0	4	26	182	291

== Clark Cup playoffs ==
Teams were reseeded after the quarterfinal round.

Quarterfinal (Best-of-5)
1	Thunder Bay Flyers	3
8	Rochester Mustangs	0
2	Des Moines Buccaneers	3
7	Sioux City Musketeers	0
3	St. Paul Vulcans	3
6	Waterloo Black Hawks	1
4	Dubuque Fighting Saints	3
5	Omaha Lancers	0

Semifinal (Best-of-5)
1	Thunder Bay Flyers	1
4	Dubuque Fighting Saints	3
2	Des Moines Buccaneers	3
3	St. Paul Vulcans	2

Championship (Best-of-5)
4	Dubuque Fighting Saints	1
2	Des Moines Buccaneers	3

Note: * denotes overtime period(s)

== Awards ==
Award	Recipient	Team
Player of the Year	Peter Ferraro	Waterloo Black Hawks
Forward of the Year	Peter Ferraro	Waterloo Black Hawks
Defenseman of the Year	Andrew Backen	Thunder Bay Flyers
Goaltender of the Year	Paul Sass	Des Moines Buccaneers
Coach of the Year	Mike Guentzel	St. Paul Vulcans
Coach of the Year	Bob Ferguson	Des Moines Buccaneers
General Manager of the Year	Bob Ferguson	Des Moines Buccaneers
General Manager of the Year	Cary Eades	Dubuque Fighting Saints
