= 1986–87 USHL season =

- League: United States Hockey League
- Sport: Ice hockey
- Games: 48
- Teams: 10

Regular season
- Anderson Cup: Rochester Mustangs

Clark Cup Playoffs
- Finals champions: Rochester Mustangs
- Runners-up: Madison Capitols

USHL seasons
- ← 1985–86 1987–88 →

The 1986–87 USHL season was the 8th season of the United States Hockey League as an all-junior league. The Rochester Mustangs won the Anderson Cup as regular season champions and the Clark Cup as postseason champions.

== Member changes ==
- The Omaha Lancers joined the league as an expansion franchise.

== Regular season ==
Final standings

Note: GP = Games played; W = Wins; L = Losses; T = Ties; OTL = Overtime losses; GF = Goals for; GA = Goals against; PTS = Points; x = clinched playoff berth; y = clinched league title

Team	GP	W	L	T	OTL	Pts	GF	GA
xy – Rochester Mustangs	48	37	9	0	2	76	340	200
x – Thunder Bay Flyers	48	35	10	1	2	73	312	180
x – Madison Capitols	48	33	14	0	1	67	282	205
x – Waterloo Black Hawks	48	23	19	0	6	52	259	266
x – Dubuque Fighting Saints	48	25	21	1	1	52	263	236
x – Des Moines Buccaneers	48	23	20	2	3	51	277	241
x – Sioux City Musketeers	48	23	23	1	1	48	256	236
x – St. Paul Vulcans	48	12	22	4	1	47	236	228
North Iowa Huskies	48	15	29	1	3	34	226	311
Omaha Lancers	48	0	46	0	2	2	105	453

== Clark Cup playoffs ==
Missing information

The Rochester Mustangs won the Clark Cup

== Awards ==
Award	Recipient	Team
Player of the Year	Terry Menard	Thunder Bay Flyers
Forward of the Year	Terry Menard	Thunder Bay Flyers
Defenseman of the Year	Darren Sheehan	Thunder Bay Flyers
Goaltender of the Year	Pat Sztrum	Thunder Bay Flyers
Coach of the Year	Dave Siciliano	Thunder Bay Flyers
General Manager of the Year	Scott Owens	Madison Capitols
