= 1987–88 USHL season =

- League: United States Hockey League
- Sport: Ice hockey
- Games: 48
- Teams: 10

Regular season
- Anderson Cup: Thunder Bay Flyers

Clark Cup Playoffs
- Finals champions: Thunder Bay Flyers
- Runners-up: Rochester Mustangs

USHL seasons
- ← 1986–87 1988–89 →

The 1987–88 USHL season was the 9th season of the United States Hockey League as an all-junior league. The Thunder Bay Flyers won the Anderson Cup as regular season champions and the Clark Cup as postseason champions.

== Member changes ==
None

== Regular season ==
Final standings

Note: GP = Games played; W = Wins; L = Losses; T = Ties; OTL = Overtime losses; GF = Goals for; GA = Goals against; PTS = Points; x = clinched playoff berth; y = clinched league title

Team	GP	W	L	T	OTL	Pts	GF	GA
xy – Thunder Bay Flyers	48	40	7	1	0	81	340	168
x – Rochester Mustangs	48	39	6	2	2	81	260	132
x – St. Paul Vulcans	48	29	11	4	4	66	277	181
x – Des Moines Buccaneers	48	23	19	3	3	52	266	270
x – Madison Capitols	48	24	22	0	2	50	256	231
x – North Iowa Huskies	48	22	21	2	3	49	238	234
x – Sioux City Musketeers	48	23	22	0	3	49	275	281
x – Waterloo Black Hawks	48	20	24	3	1	44	237	269
Dubuque Fighting Saints	48	6	39	3	0	15	158	349
Omaha Lancers	48	4	40	2	2	12	155	372

== Clark Cup playoffs ==
Missing information

The Thunder Bay Flyers won the Clark Cup

== Awards ==
Award	Recipient	Team
Player of the Year	Mike O'Hara	Rochester Mustangs
Forward of the Year	Bob Nardella	Des Moines Buccaneers
Defenseman of the Year	Chris Nelson	Rochester Mustangs
Goaltender of the Year	Mike O'Hara	Rochester Mustangs
Coach of the Year	Scott Owens	Madison Capitols
General Manager of the Year	Mark Janes	Rochester Mustangs
