= 1990–91 USHL season =

- League: United States Hockey League
- Sport: Ice hockey
- Duration: Regular season September 1990 – March 1991; Postseason; March – April 1991
- Games: 48
- Teams: 10

Regular season
- Anderson Cup: Thunder Bay Flyers

Clark Cup Playoffs
- Finals champions: Omaha Lancers
- Runners-up: Thunder Bay Flyers

USHL seasons
- ← 1989–90 1991–92 →

The 1990–91 USHL season was the 12th season of the United States Hockey League as an all-junior league. The regular season began in September 1990 and concluded in March 1991. The Thunder Bay Flyers won the Anderson Cup as regular season champions. The Omaha Lancers defeated the Thunder Bay Flyers 3 games to 1 for the Clark Cup.

== Member changes ==
None

== Regular season ==
Final standings

Note: GP = Games played; W = Wins; L = Losses; T = Ties; OTL = Overtime losses; GF = Goals for; GA = Goals against; PTS = Points; x = clinched playoff berth; y = clinched league title

Team	GP	W	L	T	OTL	Pts	GF	GA
xy – Thunder Bay Flyers	48	36	7	2	3	77	293	176
x – Omaha Lancers	48	28	13	5	2	63	258	194
x – Des Moines Buccaneers	48	28	13	2	5	63	247	187
x – St. Paul Vulcans	48	28	16	3	1	60	228	182
x – Madison Capitols	48	21	20	4	3	49	163	197
x – Dubuque Fighting Saints	48	22	24	0	2	46	245	222
x – Rochester Mustangs	48	22	25	1	0	45	205	217
x – North Iowa Huskies	48	17	21	4	6	44	215	247
Waterloo Black Hawks	48	17	25	2	4	40	162	234
Sioux City Musketeers	48	9	37	1	1	20	166	326

== Clark Cup playoffs ==
Teams were reseeded after the quarterfinal round.

Quarterfinal (Best-of-5)
1	Thunder Bay Flyers	3
8	North Iowa Huskies	0
2	Omaha Lancers	3
7	Rochester Mustangs	0
3	Des Moines Buccaneers	2
6	Dubuque Fighting Saints	3
4	St. Paul Vulcans	3
5	Madison Capitols	2

Semifinal (Best-of-5)
1	Thunder Bay Flyers	1
6	Dubuque Fighting Saints	3
2	Omaha Lancers	3
3	St. Paul Vulcans	0

Championship (Best-of-5)
1	Thunder Bay Flyers	1
2	Omaha Lancers	3

Note: * denotes overtime period(s)

== Awards ==
Award	Recipient	Team
Player of the Year	Gary Kitching	Thunder Bay Flyers
Forward of the Year	Chris Ferraro	Dubuque Fighting Saints
Defenseman of the Year	Paul Koch	Omaha Lancers
Goaltender of the Year	Chris Burns	Thunder Bay Flyers
Coach of the Year	Dave Siciliano	Thunder Bay Flyers
General Manager of the Year	Bob Ferguson	Des Moines Buccaneers
