= 1985–86 USHL season =

- League: United States Hockey League
- Sport: Ice hockey
- Games: 48
- Teams: 9

Regular season
- Anderson Cup: Sioux City Musketeers

Clark Cup Playoffs
- Finals champions: Sioux City Musketeers
- Runners-up: Rochester Mustangs

USHL seasons
- ← 1984–85 1986–87 →

The 1985–86 USHL season was the 7th season of the United States Hockey League as an all-junior league. The Sioux City Musketeers won the Anderson Cup as regular season champions and the Clark Cup as postseason champions.

== Member changes ==
- The Minneapolis Stars folded.
- The Austin Mavericks relocated and became the Rochester Mustangs, adopting the same name as an earlier senior team.

== Regular season ==
Final standings

Note: GP = Games played; W = Wins; L = Losses; T = Ties; OTL = Overtime losses; GF = Goals for; GA = Goals against; PTS = Points; x = clinched playoff berth; y = clinched league title

Team	GP	W	L	T	OTL	Pts	GF	GA
xy – Sioux City Musketeers	48	42	6	0	0	84	358	184
x – Rochester Mustangs	48	32	11	2	3	69	251	180
x – St. Paul Vulcans	48	33	13	0	2	68	258	178
x – Dubuque Fighting Saints	48	27	15	1	5	60	247	190
x – Madison Capitols	48	20	18	2	8	50	240	258
x – North Iowa Huskies	48	17	27	0	4	38	211	267
x – Waterloo Black Hawks	48	16	30	1	1	34	223	304
x – Thunder Bay Flyers	48	15	32	0	1	31	210	300
Des Moines Buccaneers	48	11	36	0	1	23	194	331

== Clark Cup playoffs ==
Missing information

The Sioux City Musketeers won the Clark Cup

== Awards ==
Award	Recipient	Team
Player of the Year	Tim Ferguson	Sioux City Musketeers
Forward of the Year	Tim Ferguson	Sioux City Musketeers
Defenseman of the Year	Kord Cernick	Dubuque Fighting Saints
Goaltender of the Year	Chad Meyhoff	Rochester Mustangs
Coach of the Year	Bob Ferguson	Austin Mavericks
General Manager of the Year	Bob Ferguson	Austin Mavericks
