= List of USHL seasons =

This is a list of seasons of the United States Hockey League since its transition to a junior hockey league in 1979.

== Junior league ==
Starting in 1979–80, the USHL changed to an all-junior league and would operate as an American competitor to the Canadian Hockey League. While the CHL is the major junior program for most professional hockey prospects, its players are forbidden by NCAA regulations to play hockey for Division I or III programs, making the USHL a favorite preparatory league for players seeking to play collegiate hockey in America.

No.	Season	No. of teams	Reg. season games	Start (reg. season)	Finish (incl. USHL playoffs)	Anderson Cup Champion	Clark Cup Champion
1	1979–80	7 (Note: The USHL began its first all-junior season in 1979 with six teams continuing from the semi-professional USHL the year before and one expansion franchise (Hennepin Nordiques).)	48			Hennepin Nordiques (30–18–0)	Hennepin Nordiques
2	1980–81	8 (Note: Waterloo Black Hawks relocated to Dubuque, Iowa, as the Fighting Saints; Hennepin Nordiques relocated to Waterloo, Iowa, as the Black Hawks; Des Moines Buccaneers added as an expansion team.)	48			Dubuque Fighting Saints (38–9–1)	Dubuque Fighting Saints
3	1981–82	7 (Note: Green Bay Bobcats ceased operations.)	48			Sioux City Musketeers (29–16–3)	Sioux City Musketeers
4	1982–83	7	48			Dubuque Fighting Saints (39–8–1)	Dubuque Fighting Saints
5	1983–84	8 (Note: North Iowa Huskies added as an expansion team.)	48			St. Paul Vulcans (37–8–0–3)	St. Paul Vulcans
6	1984–85	10 (Note: Thunder Bay Flyers and Madison Capitols are added as expansion teams. Bloomington Junior Stars change their name to Minnesota Stars.)	48			Austin Mavericks (39–8–1–0)	Dubuque Fighting Saints
7	1985–86	9 (Note: Minnesota Stars ceased operations. Austin Mavericks relocated to Rochester, Minnesota, as the Mustangs.)	48			Sioux City Musketeers (42–6–0–0)	Sioux City Musketeers
8	1986–87	10 (Note: Omaha Lancers added as an expansion team.)	48			Rochester Mustangs (37–9–0–2)	Rochester Mustangs
9	1987–88	10	48			Thunder Bay Flyers (40–7–1-0)	Thunder Bay Flyers
10	1988–89	10	48			Thunder Bay Flyers (40–6–2–0)	Thunder Bay Flyers
11	1989–90	10	48	September 30		Omaha Lancers (36–11–0–1)	Omaha Lancers
12	1990–91	10	48			Thunder Bay Flyers (36–10–2–0)	Omaha Lancers
13	1991–92	10 (Note: Madison Capitols changed their name to Wisconsin Capitols.)	48			Thunder Bay Flyers (36–11–1)	Des Moines Buccaneers
14	1992–93	10	48			Omaha Lancers (35–9–0–4)	Omaha Lancers
15	1993–94	10	48–54 (Note: For the 1993–94 season, some teams played a normal 48-game schedule, while others played slightly more with the North Iowa Huskies playing the most at 54 games.)			Des Moines Buccaneers (36–12–0–0)	Omaha Lancers
16	1994–95	11 (Note: Green Bay Gamblers added as an expansion team.)	48			Des Moines Buccaneers (38–5–5–0)	Des Moines Buccaneers
17	1995–96	11 (Note: Fargo-Moorhead Bears added as an expansion team. Wisconsin Capitols ceased operations. St. Paul Vulcans changed their name to Twin City Vulcans.)	46			Green Bay Gamblers (32–11–3–0)	Green Bay Gamblers
18	1996–97	12 (Note: Fargo-Moorhead Bears ceased operations. Fargo-Moorhead Ice Sharks and Lincoln Stars added as expansion teams.)	54		April 22	Green Bay Gamblers (41–11–0–2)	Lincoln Stars
19	1997–98	13 (Note: US National Team Development Program played a partial, 24-game schedule.)	24, 56		April 21	Des Moines Buccaneers (40–14–2)	Omaha Lancers
20	1998–99	13 (Note: US National Team Development Program added as a full-time member.)	56		April 23	Des Moines Buccaneers (48–7–0–1)	Des Moines Buccaneers
21	1999–2000	14 (Note: Sioux Falls Stampede added as an expansion team. North Iowa Huskies relocated to Cedar Rapids, Iowa, as the Cedar Rapids RoughRiders.)	58	September 17	April 27	Lincoln Stars (41–16–1)	Green Bay Gamblers
22	2000–01	13 (Note: Thunder Bay Flyers ceased operations; Fargo-Moorhead Ice Sharks relocated to Chicago, Illinois, as the Steel; Twin Cities Vulcans relocated to Kearney, Nebraska, as the Tri-City Storm. The US National Team Development Program returns to a partial, 24-game schedule.)	24, 58		April 28	Lincoln Stars (43–7–0–6)	Omaha Lancers
23	2001–02	14 (Note: Dubuque Fighting Saints relocated to Tulsa, Oklahoma, as the Crude. Topeka ScareCrows added as an expansion team after the organization's franchise was removed the professional CHL. The US National Team Development Program played once against each team.)	13, 61		May 12	Omaha Lancers (46–12-0–3)	Sioux City Musketeers
24	2002–03	11 (Note: Rochester Mustangs and Tulsa Crude ceased operations. Omaha Lancers relocated to Council Bluffs, Iowa, as the name River City Lancers. US National Team Development Program stops playing USHL games.)	60	September 27	April 29	Waterloo Black Hawks (37–14–3–6)	Lincoln Stars
25	2003–04	12 (Note: Danville Wings transferred from the NAHL. Topeka ScareCrows relocated to Chesterfield, Missouri, as the Heartland Eagles.)	60	September 26	May 5	Tri-City Storm (43–12–1–4)	Waterloo Black Hawks
26	2004–05	11 (Note: Danville Wings relocated to Indianapolis, Indiana, as the Indiana Ice. The St. Louis Heartland Eagles ceased operations.)	60	September 24	May 9	Cedar Rapids RoughRiders (42–13–1–4)	Cedar Rapids RoughRiders
27	2005–06	11 (Note: River City Lancers changed their name back to Omaha Lancers.)	60	September 23	May 1	Sioux Falls Stampede (43–13–1–3)	Des Moines Buccaneers
28	2006–07	12 (Note: Ohio Junior Blue Jackets added as an expansion team.)	60	October 5	May 15	Waterloo Black Hawks (39–17–4)	Sioux Falls Stampede
29	2007–08	12	60	October 5	May 10	Omaha Lancers (43–12–5)	Omaha Lancers
30	2008–09	12 (Note: Ohio Junior Blue Jackets ceased operations; Fargo Force added as an expansion team.)	60	October 3	May 8	Green Bay Gamblers (38–17–4)	Indiana Ice
31	2009–10	14 (Note: Youngstown Phantoms and US National Team Development Program transferred from the NAHL.)	60	October 2	May 12	Green Bay Gamblers (45–10–5)	Green Bay Gamblers
32	2010–11	16 (Note: Dubuque Fighting Saints resurrected and Muskegon Lumberjacks added as an expansion team.)	60	October 1	May 21	Cedar Rapids RoughRiders (42–13–6)	Dubuque Fighting Saints
33	2011–12	16	60	September 30	May 23	Green Bay Gamblers (47–9–4)	Green Bay Gamblers
34	2012–13	16	64	September 28	May 17	Dubuque Fighting Saints (45–11–8)	Dubuque Fighting Saints
35	2013–14	16	60	September 20	May 20	Waterloo Black Hawks (44–11–5)	Indiana Ice
36	2014–15	17 (Note: Bloomington Thunder and Madison Capitols added as expansion teams; Indiana Ice granted "dormancy status".)	60	September 26	May 15	Youngstown Phantoms (40–14–6)	Sioux Falls Stampede
37	2015–16	17	60	September 25	May 20	Cedar Rapids RoughRiders (40–15–3–2)	Tri-City Storm
38	2016–17	17	60	September 23	May 24	Sioux City Musketeers (40–13–5–2)	Chicago Steel
39	2017–18	17 (Note: Bloomington Thunder changed their name to Central Illinois Flying Aces.)	60	October 6	May 19	Waterloo Black Hawks (38–14–6–2)	Fargo Force
40	2018–19	17	62	September 27	May 17	Tri-City Storm (45–12–3–2)	Sioux Falls Stampede
41	2019–20 (Note: Remainder of season canceled on March 18, 2020, and did not resume play due to COVID-19 pandemic. All teams suspended play a week prior to cancellation.)	16 (Note: Central Illinois Flying Aces ceased operations.)	47–50	September 26	March 11	Chicago Steel (41–7–1–0)	Not awarded
42	2020–21	14 (Note: Cedar Rapids RoughRiders and Madison Capitols went on hiatus.)	49–54	November 6	April 24	Chicago Steel (38–11–3–2)	Chicago Steel
43	2021–22	16 (Note: Cedar Rapids RoughRiders and Madison Capitols returned from hiatus.)	62	September 23	May 21	Tri-City Storm (47–11–3–1)	Sioux City Musketeers
44	2022–23	16	62	September 22	May 19	Fargo Force (40–14–4–4)	Youngstown Phantoms
45	2023–24	16	62	September 20	May 22	Fargo Force (50–10–2–0)	Fargo Force
46	2024–25	16	62	September 18	May 20	Lincoln Stars (44–15–3–0)	Muskegon Lumberjacks
