= 1989–90 USHL season =

- League: United States Hockey League
- Sport: Ice hockey
- Games: 48
- Teams: 10

Regular season
- Anderson Cup: Omaha Lancers

Clark Cup Playoffs
- Finals champions: Omaha Lancers
- Runners-up: Rochester Mustangs

USHL seasons
- ← 1988–89 1990–91 →

The 1989–90 USHL season was the 11th season of the United States Hockey League as an all-junior league. The Omaha Lancers won the Anderson Cup as regular season champions. The Omaha Lancers defeated the Rochester Mustangs 3 games to 0 for the Clark Cup.

== Member changes ==
None

== Regular season ==
Final standings

Note: GP = Games played; W = Wins; L = Losses; T = Ties; OTL = Overtime losses; GF = Goals for; GA = Goals against; PTS = Points; x = clinched playoff berth; y = clinched league title

Team	GP	W	L	T	OTL	Pts	GF	GA
xy – Omaha Lancers	48	36	11	0	1	73	302	197
x – Rochester Mustangs	48	34	12	0	2	70	267	163
x – Thunder Bay Flyers	48	31	16	1	0	63	277	210
x – Sioux City Musketeers	48	29	16	1	2	61	240	187
x – Madison Capitols	48	25	16	2	5	57	220	201
x – St. Paul Vulcans	48	27	19	1	1	56	229	197
x – North Iowa Huskies	48	21	25	0	2	44	228	223
x – Des Moines Buccaneers	48	17	29	2	0	36	216	297
Waterloo Black Hawks	48	7	36	3	2	19	181	314
Dubuque Fighting Saints	48	8	39	0	1	17	152	323

== Clark Cup playoffs ==
Teams were reseeded after the quarterfinal round.

Quarterfinal (Best-of-5)
1	Omaha Lancers	3
8	Des Moines Buccaneers	0
2	Rochester Mustangs	3
7	North Iowa Huskies	0
3	Thunder Bay Flyers	3
6	St. Paul Vulcans	0
4	Sioux City Musketeers	0
5	Madison Capitols	3

Semifinal (Best-of-5)
1	Omaha Lancers	3
5	Madison Capitols	0
2	Rochester Mustangs	3
3	Thunder Bay Flyers	2

Championship (Best-of-5)
1	Omaha Lancers	3
2	Rochester Mustangs	0

Note: * denotes overtime period(s)

== Awards ==
Award	Recipient	Team
Player of the Year	Gary Kitching	Thunder Bay Flyers
Forward of the Year	Kurt Miller	Rochester Mustangs
Defenseman of the Year	John Gruden	Waterloo Black Hawks
Goaltender of the Year	Jeff Levy	Rochester Mustangs
Coach of the Year	Bob Ferguson	Sioux City Musketeers
General Manager of the Year	Frank Serratore	Omaha Lancers
