= 1984–85 USHL season =

- League: United States Hockey League
- Sport: Ice hockey
- Games: 48
- Teams: 10

Regular season
- Anderson Cup: Austin Mavericks

Clark Cup Playoffs
- Finals champions: Dubuque Fighting Saints
- Runners-up: St. Paul Vulcans

USHL seasons
- ← 1983–84 1985–86 →

The 1984–85 USHL season was the 6th season of the United States Hockey League as an all-junior league. The Sioux City Musketeers won the Anderson Cup as regular season champions while the Dubuque Fighting Saints won the Clark Cup as postseason champions.

== Member changes ==
- The Madison Capitols joined the league as an expansion franchise.
- After the collapse of the Thunder Bay Hockey League, the Thunder Bay Kings were admitted into the USHL. The team rebranded as the Thunder Bay Flyers for this season.

== Regular season ==
Final standings

Note: GP = Games played; W = Wins; L = Losses; T = Ties; OTL = Overtime losses; GF = Goals for; GA = Goals against; PTS = Points; x = clinched playoff berth; y = clinched league title

Team	GP	W	L	T	OTL	Pts	GF	GA
xy – Austin Mavericks	48	39	8	1	0	79	317	177
x – Minneapolis Jr. Stars	48	37	9	0	2	76	259	151
x – Dubuque Fighting Saints	48	30	14	0	4	64	267	232
x – St. Paul Vulcans	48	31	16	0	1	63	263	198
x – Sioux City Musketeers	48	27	14	1	6	61	268	209
x – Waterloo Black Hawks	48	21	24	0	3	45	260	278
x – Thunder Bay Flyers	48	20	25	0	3	43	250	252
x – Madison Capitols	48	15	30	1	2	33	217	277
North Iowa Huskies	48	11	35	0	2	25	178	333
Des Moines Buccaneers	48	7	37	1	3	18	183	255

== Clark Cup playoffs ==
Missing information

The Dubuque Fighting Saints won the Clark Cup

== Awards ==
Award	Recipient	Team
Player of the Year	Scott Shoffstall	Sioux City Musketeers
Forward of the Year	Scott Shoffstall	Sioux City Musketeers
Defenseman of the Year	Mike Castellano	Austin Mavericks
Goaltender of the Year	Jeff Meis	Minneapolis Jr. Stars
Coach of the Year	Frank Serratore	Austin Mavericks
General Manager of the Year	Frank Serratore	Austin Mavericks
