= 1983–84 USHL season =

- League: United States Hockey League
- Sport: Ice hockey
- Games: 48
- Teams: 8

Regular season
- Anderson Cup: St. Paul Vulcans

Clark Cup Playoffs
- Finals champions: St. Paul Vulcans
- Runners-up: Sioux City Musketeers

USHL seasons
- ← 1982–83 1984–85 →

The 1983–84 USHL season was the 5th season of the United States Hockey League as an all-junior league. The St. Paul Vulcans won the Anderson Cup as regular season champions and the Clark Cup as postseason champions.

== Member changes ==
- The North Iowa Huskies joined the league as an expansion franchise.

== Regular season ==
Final standings

Note: GP = Games played; W = Wins; L = Losses; T = Ties; OTL = Overtime losses; GF = Goals for; GA = Goals against; PTS = Points

Team	GP	W	L	T	OTL	Pts	GF	GA
St. Paul Vulcans	48	37	8	0	3	77	246	160
Austin Mavericks	48	35	11	0	2	72	277	192
Sioux City Musketeers	48	32	11	2	3	69	305	204
Des Moines Buccaneers	48	23	21	1	3	50	270	259
Dubuque Fighting Saints	48	20	23	2	3	45	227	246
North Iowa Huskies	48	21	25	1	1	44	239	264
Waterloo Black Hawks	48	11	33	1	3	26	199	307
Bloomington Junior Stars	48	8	34	3	3	22	161	292

== Clark Cup playoffs ==
Missing information

The St. Paul Vulcans won the Clark Cup

== Awards ==
Award	Recipient	Team
Player of the Year	Jay Cates	St. Paul Vulcans
Forward of the Year	Jay Cates	St. Paul Vulcans
Defenseman of the Year	Doug Claggett	Dubuque Fighting Saints
Goaltender of the Year	Craig Shermoen	St. Paul Vulcans
Coach of the Year	Kevin Hartzell	St. Paul Vulcans
General Manager of the Year	Ron Woodey	St. Paul Vulcans
