= 1988–89 USHL season =

- League: United States Hockey League
- Sport: Ice hockey
- Games: 48
- Teams: 10

Regular season
- Anderson Cup: Thunder Bay Flyers

Clark Cup Playoffs
- Finals champions: Thunder Bay Flyers
- Runners-up: St. Paul Vulcans

USHL seasons
- ← 1987–88 1989–90 →

The 1988–89 USHL season was the 10th season of the United States Hockey League as an all-junior league. The Thunder Bay Flyers won the Anderson Cup as regular season champions and the Clark Cup as postseason champions.

== Member changes ==
None

== Regular season ==
Final standings

Note: GP = Games played; W = Wins; L = Losses; T = Ties; OTL = Overtime losses; GF = Goals for; GA = Goals against; PTS = Points; x = clinched playoff berth; y = clinched league title

Team	GP	W	L	T	OTL	Pts	GF	GA
xy – Thunder Bay Flyers	48	40	6	2	0	82	340	189
x – St. Paul Vulcans	48	38	10	0	0	76	306	171
x – Madison Capitols	48	33	10	3	2	71	316	211
x – Rochester Mustangs	48	31	11	4	2	68	221	146
x – North Iowa Huskies	48	24	19	2	3	53	286	264
x – Des Moines Buccaneers	48	18	27	1	2	39	250	276
x – Sioux City Musketeers	48	17	28	1	2	37	248	273
x – Omaha Lancers	48	15	31	2	0	32	204	277
Waterloo Black Hawks	48	9	37	0	2	20	169	338
Dubuque Fighting Saints	48	7	40	1	0	15	185	380

== Clark Cup playoffs ==
Missing information

The Thunder Bay Flyers won the Clark Cup

== Awards ==
Award	Recipient	Team
Player of the Year	Mark Karpen	North Iowa Huskies
Forward of the Year	Greg Johnson	Thunder Bay Flyers
Defenseman of the Year	Mark Peterson	St. Paul Vulcans
Goaltender of the Year	Corey Chwialkowsk	Rochester Mustangs
Coach of the Year	Dave Siciliano	Thunder Bay Flyers
General Manager of the Year	Bob Motzko	North Iowa Huskies
