= 1981–82 USHL season =

- League: United States Hockey League
- Sport: Ice hockey
- Games: 48
- Teams: 7

Regular season
- Anderson Cup: Sioux City Musketeers

Clark Cup Playoffs
- Finals champions: Sioux City Musketeers
- Runners-up: Des Moines Buccaneers

USHL seasons
- ← 1980–81 1982–83 →

The 1981–82 USHL season was the 3rd season of the United States Hockey League as an all-junior league. The Sioux City Musketeers won the Anderson Cup as regular season champions and the Clark Cup as postseason champions.

== Member changes ==
- The Green Bay Bobcats folded.

== Regular season ==
Final standings

Note: GP = Games played; W = Wins; L = Losses; T = Ties; GF = Goals for; GA = Goals against; PTS = Points

Team	GP	W	L	T	Pts	GF	GA
Sioux City Musketeers	48	29	16	3	61	281	226
Dubuque Fighting Saints	48	29	19	0	58	274	232
Bloomington Junior Stars	48	28	20	0	56	302	233
St. Paul Vulcans	48	26	21	1	53	263	251
Austin Mavericks	48	24	24	0	48	234	252
Des Moines Buccaneers	48	18	29	1	37	265	314
Waterloo Black Hawks	48	11	36	1	23	179	290

=== Scoring leaders ===
The following players led the league in regular season points at the completion of all regular season games.

Player	Team	GP	G	A	Pts	PIM
Myles Hart	Des Moines Buccaneers	48	32	78	110	–
Jerry Bolstad	Dubuque Fighting Saints	48	56	47	103	–
Scott Staff	Dubuque Fighting Saints	48	48	53	101	–
Brian Williams	Sioux City Musketeers	48	44	56	100	–
Dan Dorion	Austin Mavericks	50	53	44	97	–
Fred Kaminska	Sioux City Musketeers	47	25	68	93	–
Nick Holmes	St. Paul Vulcans	45	38	54	92	–
Scott Rupp	Des Moines Buccaneers	48	34	54	88	–
Pete Ryskamp	Sioux City Musketeers	48	39	46	85	–
Peter Bonin	St. Paul Vulcans	36	32	47	79	–

== Clark Cup playoffs ==
Missing information

The Sioux City Musketeers won the Clark Cup

== Awards ==
Award	Recipient	Team
Player of the Year	Brian Williams	Sioux City Musketeers
Forward of the Year	Scott Staff	Dubuque Fighting Saints
Forward of the Year	Myler Hart	Des Moines Buccaneers
Defenseman of the Year	Fred Kaminska	Sioux City Musketeers
Goaltender of the Year	Doug Spedding	Sioux City Musketeers
Rookie of the Year	Brian Williams	Sioux City Musketeers
Rookie of the Year	Scott Staff	Dubuque Fighting Saints
