= 1980–81 USHL season =

- League: United States Hockey League
- Sport: Ice hockey
- Games: 48
- Teams: 8

Regular season
- Anderson Cup: Dubuque Fighting Saints

Clark Cup Playoffs
- Finals champions: Dubuque Fighting Saints
- Runners-up: Austin Mavericks

USHL seasons
- ← 1979–80 1981–82 →

The 1980–81 USHL season was the 2nd season of the United States Hockey League as an all-junior league. The Dubuque Fighting Saints won the Anderson Cup as regular season champions and the Clark Cup as postseason champions.

== Member changes ==
- The Waterloo Black Hawks relocated and became the Dubuque Fighting Saints. Shortly afterwards, the Hennepin Nordiques relocated to Waterloo and assumed the name and history of the Black Hawks.
- The Des Moines Buccaneers joined the league as an expansion franchise.

== Regular season ==
Final standings

Note: GP = Games played; W = Wins; L = Losses; T = Ties; GF = Goals for; GA = Goals against; PTS = Points; y = clinched division title; z = clinched league title

=== North Division ===
Team	GP	W	L	T	Pts	GF	GA
y – Green Bay Bobcats	48	29	19	0	58	292	218
Austin Mavericks	48	28	19	1	57	253	218
St. Paul Vulcans	48	28	19	1	57	291	223
Bloomington Junior Stars	48	15	32	1	31	206	289

=== South Division ===
Team	GP	W	L	T	Pts	GF	GA
yz – Dubuque Fighting Saints	48	38	9	1	77	351	187
Des Moines Buccaneers	48	23	25	0	46	240	299
Waterloo Black Hawks	48	16	32	0	32	220	311
Sioux City Musketeers	48	12	36	0	24	200	308

==== Scoring leaders ====
The following players led the league in regular season points at the completion of all regular season games.

Player	Team	GP	G	A	Pts	PIM
Mike Carlson	Dubuque Fighting Saints	47	59	68	127	–
Brian Collins	Dubuque Fighting Saints	48	55	53	108	–
Tom Strelow	St. Paul Vulcans	–	50	44	94	–
Steve Palmiscno	Des Moines Buccaneers	–	47	44	91	–
Tim Lee	Green Bay Bobcats	–	48	38	86	–
Bill Mason	Green Bay Bobcats	–	33	52	85	–
Jeff Thole	St. Paul Vulcans	–	36	44	80	–
Myles Hart	Des Moines Buccaneers	–	31	49	80	–
Dave Mogush	Dubuque Fighting Saints	48	40	38	78	–
Dean Thomas	Dubuque Fighting Saints	47	33	41	74	–

== Clark Cup playoffs ==
Missing information

The Dubuque Fighting Saints won the Clark Cup

== Awards ==
Award	Recipient	Team
Player of the Year	Mike Carlson	Dubuque Fighting Saints
Forward of the Year	Mike Carlson	Dubuque Fighting Saints
Defenseman of the Year	Rick Zombo	Austin Mavericks
Goaltender of the Year	Brian Granger	Dubuque Fighting Saints
Rookie of the Year	Mike Carlson	Dubuque Fighting Saints
Coach of the Year	Jack Barzee	Dubuque Fighting Saints
General Manager of the Year	Jack Barzee	Dubuque Fighting Saints
