= 1982–83 USHL season =

- League: United States Hockey League
- Sport: Ice hockey
- Games: 48
- Teams: 7

Regular season
- Anderson Cup: Dubuque Fighting Saints

Clark Cup Playoffs
- Finals champions: Dubuque Fighting Saints
- Runners-up: Sioux City Musketeers

USHL seasons
- ← 1981–82 1983–84 →

The 1982–83 USHL season was the 4th season of the United States Hockey League as an all-junior league. The Dubuque Fighting Saints won the Anderson Cup as regular season champions and the Clark Cup as postseason champions.

== Member changes ==
None

== Regular season ==
Final standings

Note: GP = Games played; W = Wins; L = Losses; T = Ties; GF = Goals for; GA = Goals against; PTS = Points

Team	GP	W	L	T	Pts	GF	GA
Dubuque Fighting Saints	48	39	8	1	79	350	217
Sioux City Musketeers	48	34	14	0	68	271	199
Des Moines Buccaneers	48	25	22	1	51	298	309
Austin Mavericks	48	23	23	2	48	244	233
Bloomington Junior Stars	48	20	28	0	40	257	263
St. Paul Vulcans	48	18	28	2	38	242	294
Waterloo Black Hawks	48	6	42	0	12	189	336

== Clark Cup playoffs ==
Missing information

The Dubuque Fighting Saints won the Clark Cup

== Awards ==
Award	Recipient	Team
Player of the Year	Steve MacSwain	Dubuque Fighting Saints
Forward of the Year	Steve MacSwain	Dubuque Fighting Saints
Defenseman of the Year	Gary Suter	Dubuque Fighting Saints
Goaltender of the Year	Dana Orent	Sioux City Musketeers
Rookie of the Year	Steve MacSwain	Dubuque Fighting Saints
Coach of the Year	Jack Barzee	Dubuque Fighting Saints
General Manager of the Year	Jack Barzee	Dubuque Fighting Saints
