= Wisconsin Capitols =

- City: Madison, Wisconsin
- League: United States Hockey League
- Founded: 1984
- Folded: 1995
- Home arena: Hartmeyer Ice Arena
- Colors: Red, black and white

Franchise history
- 1984–1991: Madison Capitols
- 1991–1995: Wisconsin Capitols

The Wisconsin Capitols were a Tier I junior ice hockey team that played in the United States Hockey League.

== History ==
=== Early history (1984–1991) ===
The Madison Capitols began as a team in 1984, competing in the USHL, and played for 11 consecutive seasons. During this period, the Capitols played home games at the Hartmeyer Ice Arena, posting a 207–278–16 record, playing a total of 530 games.

The team was coached by Bob Suter from 1984 to 1986, posting a 35–48–3–10 record. Following what was a mild start to the franchise, Scott Owens took over coaching duties in 1986 and started a winning franchise, posting a 136–85–9–10 record through 1991. Owens would then move on to coach the Des Moines Buccaneers and Colorado College, ending the first era of the Madison Capitols.

=== Wisconsin Capitols (1991–1995) ===
With the departure of Owens, the Madison Capitols re-branded themselves as the Wisconsin Capitols in 1991. Steve Huglen, a University of Illinois Defensemen, was hired as head coach for the 1991–1992 campaign and the Capitols intended to continue their winning record; however, under Huglen the team posted an 11–37–0 season.

The 1992–93 campaign saw the departure of Huglen, and the addition of Mike Dibble as head coach. After the team posted a 2–21–2 record Dibble was replaced by Rob Andriga mid-season, who would coach the Capitols to a 4–19–1 record, finishing at 6–39–2–1 season record.

In the 1993–94 season, Andringa was still coaching the Wisconsin Capitols, along with the additions of Don Granato, and Brian Duffy. The Capitols would post a 9–37–1–3 record this season, second to their worst. The era of the Wisconsin Capitols and, for the time being, USHL hockey in Madison was close to an end.

The final season of the Capitols in Madison in 1994–95, saw the return of Duffy, who would post a 3–8–0 record as head coach. The replacement coach, Len Semplice would finish the season with a 7–29–1 record, totaling a team season record of 10–37–1.

== Season-by-season record ==
Season	GP	W	L	OTL	Pts	GF	GA	Finish	Playoffs	
Madison Capitols
1984–85	48	15	30	1	2	33	217	277	8th of 10, USHL	Missing information
1985–86	48	20	18	2	8	50	240	258	5th of 9, USHL	Missing information
1986–87	48	33	14	0	1	67	282	205	3rd of 10, USHL	Missing information
1987–88	48	24	22	0	2	50	256	231	5th of 10, USHL	Missing information
1988–89	48	33	10	3	2	71	316	211	3rd of 10, USHL	Missing information
1989–90	48	25	16	2	5	57	220	201	5th of 10, USHL	Won Quarterfinal series, 3–0 (Sioux City Musketeers); Lost Semifinal series, 0–3 (Omaha Lancers)
1990–91	48	21	23	4	0	49	163	197	5th of 10, USHL	Lost Quarterfinal series, 2–3 (St. Paul Vulcans)
Wisconsin Capitols
1991–92	48	11	37	0	0	26	182	291	10th of 10, USHL	Did not qualify
1992–93	48	6	39	2	1	15	135	273	10th of 10, USHL	Did not qualify
1993–94	48	9	35	1	3	22	128	252	9th of 10, USHL	Did not qualify
1994–95	48	10	32	1	5	26	145	245	10th of 11, USHL	Did not qualify

== Personnel ==
=== NHL alumni ===
- Alex Brooks, 1993-94
- John Byce, 1985-86
- Don Granato, 1985-87
- Mark Osiecki, 1986-87
- Derek Plante, 1989–90
- Brian Rafalski, 1990–91

=== Awards and player recognition ===
- Scott Owens – USHL General Manager of the Year, 1986–87
- Scott Owens – USHL Coach of the Year, 1987–88
- Joe Harwell – 1988-89 All-USHL 1st Team
- Forrest Karr – 1994-95 All-USHL 2nd Team
