= Alex Brooks =

American ice hockey player

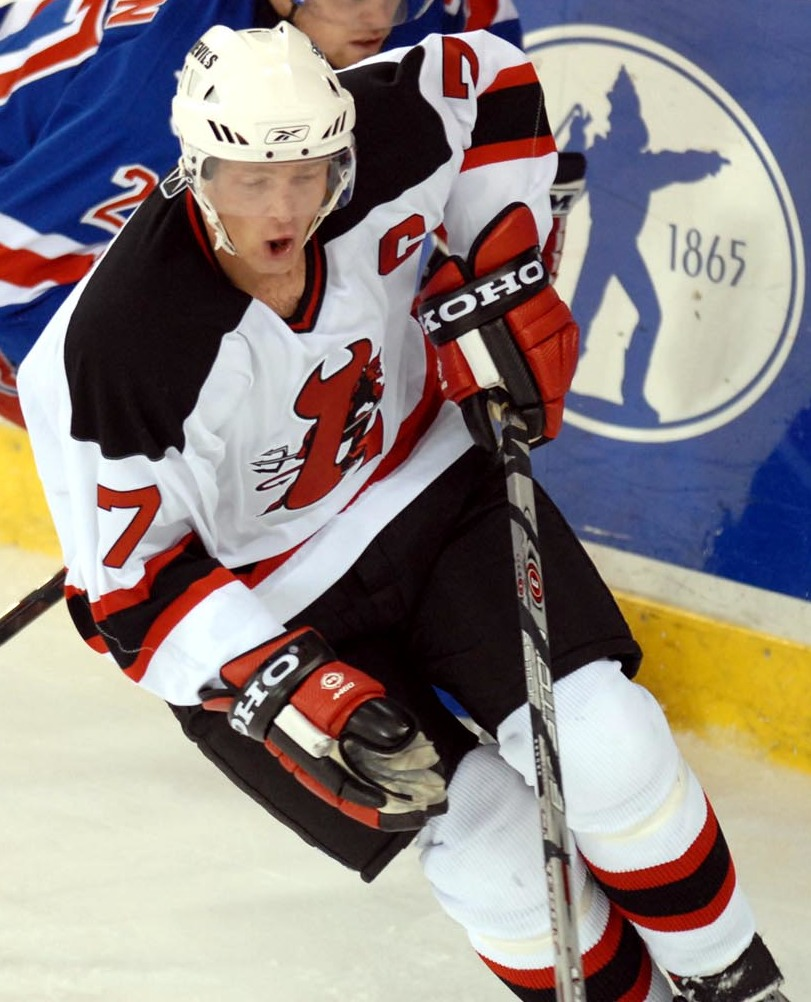
- Brooks with the Lowell Devils in 2006
- Born: August 21, 1976 (age 48); Madison, Wisconsin, USA
- Height: 6 ft 1 in (185 cm)
- Weight: 195 lb (88 kg; 13 st 13 lb)
- Position: Defense
- Shot: Right
- Played for: Jokerit; New Jersey Devils
- NHL draft: Undrafted
- Playing career: 2001–2011

Alex Whitmore Brooks (born August 21, 1976) is an American former professional ice hockey defenseman who played, as an undrafted player, 19 games in the National Hockey League for the New Jersey Devils in the 2006–07 season.

== Playing career ==
Undrafted and out of college from the University of Wisconsin, Brooks took his game to Jokerit of the Finnish First League. The New Jersey Devils, attracted to Brooks' tough defensive play, signed the defenseman to an entry-level contract. Brooks spent four years with the Devils' minor league affiliate, the Albany River Rats. When veteran center Pascal Rheaume was traded, Brooks was named captain, and held that post even after the team relocated to Lowell.

In the 2006–07 season, when several Devils were injured, including Colin White, Johnny Oduya, and Brad Lukowich, Brooks was called up, playing 19 games and scoring 1 assist to go along with 4 PIM. Then, in a game against the St. Louis Blues, Brooks broke his foot, and was subsequently sent back to Lowell, and was replaced by Andy Greene. He returned to Lowell and regained his post as captain. Andy Greene flourished, and thus, Brooks was left in Lowell.

On August 9, 2007, Brooks signed on with the St. Louis Blues. However, with chances limited, Brooks provided a veteran presence in Peoria, the Blues' minor league squad. He played one season with the Chicago Wolves of the AHL before returning to Finland and Jokerit for the 2009–10 season.

Brooks played his final professional season with Karlskrona HK of the Swedish Division 1 in 2010–11 before retiring and joining the Chicago Blackhawks staff as a pro scout.

== Career statistics ==
=== Regular season and playoffs ===
			Regular season					Playoffs
Season	Team	League	GP	G	A	Pts	PIM	GP	G	A	Pts	PIM
1993–94	Wisconsin Capitols	USHL	13	3	11	14	6	—	—	—	—	—
1994–95	Madison West High School	HS-WI	24	13	28	31	12	—	—	—	—	—
1995–96	Green Bay Gamblers	USHL	43	3	22	25	213	—	—	—	—	—
1997–98	University of Wisconsin	WCHA	40	1	4	5	72	—	—	—	—	—
1998–99	University of Wisconsin	WCHA	37	0	3	3	73	—	—	—	—	—
1999–00	University of Wisconsin	WCHA	41	4	10	14	78	—	—	—	—	—
2000–01	University of Wisconsin	WCHA	41	3	16	19	76	—	—	—	—	—
2001–02	Jokerit	SM-l	53	1	3	4	109	12	0	0	0	11
2002–03	Albany River Rats	AHL	66	0	7	7	56	—	—	—	—	—
2003–04	Albany River Rats	AHL	77	2	6	8	100	—	—	—	—	—
2004–05	Albany River Rats	AHL	63	0	6	6	83	—	—	—	—	—
2005–06	Albany River Rats	AHL	58	1	4	5	81	—	—	—	—	—
2006–07	Lowell Devils	AHL	21	0	2	2	6	—	—	—	—	—
2006–07	New Jersey Devils	NHL	19	0	1	1	4	—	—	—	—	—
2007–08	Peoria Rivermen	AHL	70	0	8	8	90	—	—	—	—	—
2008–09	Chicago Wolves	AHL	50	0	10	10	58	—	—	—	—	—
2009–10	Jokerit	SM-l	25	2	3	5	53	1	0	0	0	0
2010–11	Karlskrona HK	SWE-3	11	0	2	2	10	10	0	4	4	8
AHL totals			405	3	43	46	474	—	—	—	—	—
NHL totals			19	0	1	1	4	—	—	—	—	—

== Awards and honors ==
Award	Year
All-WCHA Third Team	1999–00
