= Mark Carlson (ice hockey) =

American ice hockey player (born 1969)

- Born: February 5, 1969 (age 57); Lawrenceville, New Jersey
- Education: University of Massachusetts-Lowell (B.S.); Northeastern University (MES)
- Spouse: Tammy
- Children: 2
Ice hockey career
- Position: Left wing
- Shot: Left
- NHL draft: 215th overall, 1987; Pittsburgh Penguins
- Playing career: 1990–1993

Mark Carlson (born February 5, 1969) is the Cedar Rapids RoughRiders President, Head Coach and General Manager. In 2016, he became the second United States Hockey League (USHL) coach to reach 1,000 games.

== Early life and education ==
Carlson was born in the Lawrenceville section of Lawrence Township, Mercer County, New Jersey.

Carlson attended the University of Massachusetts-Lowell from 1990 until 1993. He played for the UMass Lowell River Hawks men's ice hockey. Carlson recorded his first collegiate goal on February 1, 1992, against the Wildcats.

== Coaching career ==
=== College ===
After graduating with a B.S. in Business Administration and Marketing, he assumed the role of assistant coach for the 1995–96 season. After his first stint with the UMass River Hawks helped lead them to the 1996 NCAA tournament, Carlson became an assistant coach and recruiting coordinator at Northeastern University. In 1999, Carlson was offered a job at Colorado College, but committed to continue working alongside Bruce Crowder at UMass-Lowell.

=== USHL ===
On July 7, 1999, Carlson was named the head coach of the Cedar Rapids RoughRiders of the United States Hockey League (USHL). During the team's inaugural season in Cedar Rapids, they had no home arena and practiced at Coral Ridge Mall. The team played their first game on September 24, 1999. He signed a three-year extension at the end of the season.

In his second season as head coach, the RoughRiders qualified for the USHL playoffs and won the first series. Carlson led the RoughRiders to their first Clark Cup during the 2004–05 USHL season. He led them to a 42-13-5 record during the regular season and a 9–2 record during the playoffs. As a result, he was the recipient of the 2005 USHL Coach of the Year.

In 2009, Carlson was re-signed to a 10-year contract courtesy of Newco Riders, LLC., which also included ownership of the team. He was also selected to coach the 2009 U.S. Junior Select Team at the World Junior A Challenge. The following season, Carlson led the RoughRiders to the Anderson Cup and was named USHL Coach of the Year. The season set a new record for the league's best regular season record of 42-12-6. As well, the RoughRiders had the best home record in the League and set a new team high for longest home winning streak. Carlson achieved a personal milestone as well by becoming the sixth coach in USHL history to reach 400 wins. After that season, Carlson was offered a coaching position at the University of Massachusetts, which he declined.

During the 2015–16 season, Carlson became the second USHL coach to reach 1,000 games. After the RoughRiders clinched the Anderson Cup, he was named USHL Coach of the Year. Carlson continued his success with the RoughRiders and eventually became the first coach in the USHL to record 600 career wins with one team.

== Awards and recognitions ==
In January 2019, Carlson was nominated for the inaugural Darcy Haugan Memorial Award, named after Humboldt Broncos coach.

== Personal life ==
Carlson is married to Tammy and they have two sons together.
