= Jake Taylor (ice hockey) =

American ice hockey player

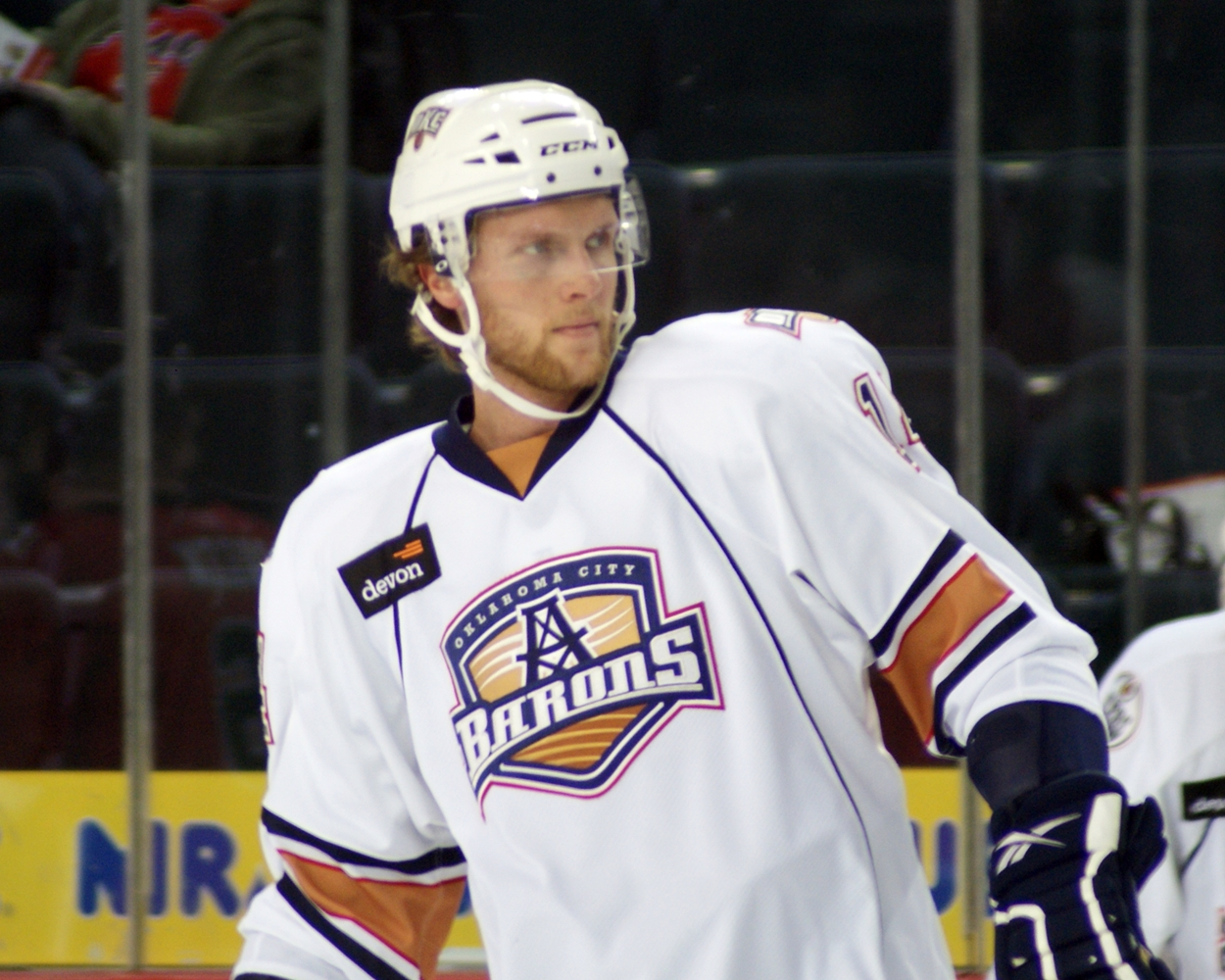
- 2010–11 Oklahoma City Barons
- Born: August 1, 1983 (age 42) Rochester, Minnesota, U.S.
- Height: 6 ft 4 in (193 cm)
- Weight: 225 lb (102 kg; 16 st 1 lb)
- Position: Defense
- Shot: Right
- Played for: Hartford Wolf Pack; Springfield Falcons; Oklahoma City Barons
- NHL draft: 177th overall, 2002; New York Rangers
- Playing career: 2004–2011

Jake Taylor (born August 1, 1983) is an American former professional ice hockey defenseman who played in the American Hockey League (AHL). He was selected by the New York Rangers in the 6th round of the 2002 NHL entry draft, 177th overall.

== Playing career ==
Taylor began his career in 2000, playing for the Green Bay Gamblers of the United States Hockey League (USHL).

After being drafted by the New York Rangers in 2002, Taylor completed his junior career, playing his final season with Green Bay, and was the winner of the USHL's Curt Hammer Award in 2002–03, before going on to represent the University of Minnesota the following year.

Taylor turned pro in 2004; he was assigned to the Rangers' AHL affiliates, the Hartford Wolf Pack. He played 43 games for the Wolf Pack in his first season there, registering 3 assists. He would spend the next four years in the Rangers' system, playing for the Wolf Pack and the Charlotte Checkers, their ECHL affiliates.

The 2008–09 season would see Taylor in new surroundings when he joined the Edmonton Oilers organization after becoming a free agent. He was assigned to the Springfield Falcons, the Oilers' AHL affiliates, after impressing at training camp. In his two seasons in Springfield, Taylor played a total of 100 games for the Falcons, scoring 1 goal and 10 assists, tallying 11 points.

On July 9, 2010, Taylor and Colin McDonald, a fellow Falcons teammate, were announced as their first-ever players signed up to play for the Oilers' recently reactivated AHL franchise, the Oklahoma City Barons, for their inaugural season.

== Awards ==
- 2002–03: USHL Curt Hammer Award

== Career statistics ==
			Regular season					Playoffs
Season	Team	League	GP	G	A	Pts	PIM	GP	G	A	Pts	PIM
2000–01	Rochester Lourdes High School	HSMN	29	9	15	24	34	—	—	—	—	—
2000–01	Green Bay Gamblers	USHL	5	0	0	0	8	—	—	—	—	—
2001–02	Green Bay Gamblers	USHL	56	1	2	3	147	7	0	0	0	11
2002–03	Green Bay Gamblers	USHL	60	8	8	16	160	—	—	—	—	—
2003–04	University of Minnesota	WCHA	39	2	6	8	68	—	—	—	—	—
2004–05	Hartford Wolf Pack	AHL	43	0	3	3	156	—	—	—	—	—
2004–05	Charlotte Checkers	ECHL	11	0	2	2	31	—	—	—	—	—
2005–06	Hartford Wolf Pack	AHL	66	1	11	12	128	5	0	0	0	6
2006–07	Charlotte Checkers	ECHL	4	0	0	0	7	—	—	—	—	—
2006–07	Hartford Wolf Pack	AHL	15	0	1	1	29	—	—	—	—	—
2007–08	Hartford Wolf Pack	AHL	77	3	10	13	129	5	0	0	0	0
2008–09	Springfield Falcons	AHL	28	1	3	4	52	—	—	—	—	—
2009–10	Springfield Falcons	AHL	72	0	7	7	182	—	—	—	—	—
2010–11	Oklahoma City Barons	AHL	65	0	5	5	135	6	0	1	1	10
AHL totals			366	5	40	45	811	16	0	1	1	16
ECHL totals			15	0	2	2	38	—	—	—	—	—
