= Scott Owens (ice hockey) =

American ice hockey player and coach (born 1956)

Current position
- Title: General manager
- Team: Des Moines Buccaneers

Biographical details
- Born: March 7, 1956 (age 70); Madison, Wisconsin, U.S.

Playing career
- 1975–1979: Colorado College
- 1979–1984: TSV Kottern
- Position: Goaltender

Coaching career (HC unless noted)
- 1979–1984: TSV Kottern (assistant)
- 1984–1990: Madison Capitols
- 1990–1991: Wisconsin (assistant)
- 1991–1995: Colorado College (assistant)
- 1995–1999: Des Moines Buccaneers
- 1999–2014: Colorado College
- 2015–2020: Sioux Falls Stampede

Head coaching record
- Overall: 324–228–54 (.579) (College); 405–226–62 (.629) (USHL)

Accomplishments and honors

Championships
- 1999 Clark Cup Championship; 2003 WCHA regular season champion 2005 WCHA regular season champion 2008 WCHA regular season champion 2019 Clark Cup Championship

Scott Owens (born March 7, 1956) is an American former ice hockey player and coach. Owens was the long-time head coach of Colorado College.

== Career ==
Scott Owens made his first appearance for the Colorado College (CC) Tigers during the 1975–76 season. While none of his four years saw CC finish with a winning record, they did earn their only conference title in school history in 1978. Once he had graduated, Owens became a player-assistant coach with TSV Kottern, which played in varying levels of West Germany's amateur leagues, for five years before returning to North America.

Owens' next job came in his home town of Madison as general manager for the newly formed Madison Capitols of the United States Hockey League (USHL). After two seasons, Owens also took the head coaching position with the Capitols, and under his leadership the team routinely finished in the top half of league standings. Owens left after the 1989–90 season to accept a position with the NCAA Wisconsin Badgers as an assistant under his old head coach Jeff Sauer. In 1991, he moved back to his alma mater Colorado College as an assistant coach. After four more seasons with the Tigers, Owens headed back to the USHL as head coach of the Des Moines Buccaneers.

Despite a rocky start that saw his first losing record as a head coach, Owen's tenure in Des Moines was even more successful than his time with the Capitols. In his third year, the Buccaneers won the Anderson Cup as the best regular season team and followed it up with a repeat performance in addition to a Clark Cup for winning the league title. Owens then returned Colorado College to take over as head coach. With the departed Don Lucia having revived the moribund program, Owens stepped in and had immediate success, making the NCAA tournament three straight years. The fourth year culminated with Peter Sejna, a player Owens had coached and recruited in Des Moines, winning the Hobey Baker Award, the first in school history.

Two years later, Owens has his best season with Colorado College, winning 31 games and qualifying for the 2005 Frozen Four with Colorado College's second Hobey Baker winner, Marty Sertich. After the success in his early years, Colorado College began to slip back into the rest of the pack. While still maintaining winning seasons over the next seven years, CC would only top 20 wins three times and win only one more game in the NCAA tournament before CC posted its first losing season in 20 years at 18–19–5 in 2012–13. The following year was much worse as the Tigers won only seven games and Owens then stepped down as head coach after 15 seasons. At the time of his resignation, Owens was both the longest tenured and winningest coach in Colorado College's ice hockey program history.

On May 21, 2015, Owens returned to coaching and the United States Hockey League when he was named head coach of the Sioux Falls Stampede. He retired from coaching on March 26, 2020, and returned to the Des Moines Buccaneers as general manager.

== Head coaching record ==
Record table
Season	Team	Overall	Conference	Standing	Postseason
Colorado College Tigers (WCHA) (1999–2013)
1999–00	Colorado College	18–18–3	14–11–3	5th	WCHA first round
2000–01	Colorado College	27–13–1	17–11–0	4th	NCAA East Regional semifinals
2001–02	Colorado College	27–13–3	16–10–2	4th	NCAA West Regional semifinals
2002–03	Colorado College	30–7–5	19–4–5	1st	NCAA Midwest Regional final
2003–04	Colorado College	20–16–3	11–15–2	7th	WCHA Quarterfinal
2004–05	Colorado College	31–9–3	19–7–2	t-1st	NCAA Frozen Four
2005–06	Colorado College	24–16–2	15–11–2	5th	NCAA Midwest Regional semifinals
2006–07	Colorado College	18–17–4	13–12–3	5th	WCHA first round
2007–08	Colorado College	28–12–1	21–6–1	1st	NCAA West Regional semifinals
2008–09	Colorado College	16–12–10	12–9–7	4th	WCHA first round
2009–10	Colorado College	19–17–3	12–13–3	6th	WCHA first round
2010–11	Colorado College	23–19–3	13–13–2	6th	NCAA West Regional final
2011–12	Colorado College	18–16–2	15–12–1	5th	WCHA first round
2012–13	Colorado College	18–19–5	11–13–4	8th	WCHA runner-up
Colorado College:		317–204–48	208–147–37		
Colorado College Tigers (NCHC) (2013–2014)
2013–14	Colorado College	7–24–6	6–13–5–1	7th	NCHC quarterfinals
Colorado College:		7–24–6	6–13–5–1		
Total:		324–228–54			
National champion Postseason invitational champion Conference regular season champion Conference regular season and conference tournament champion Division regular season champion Division regular season and conference tournament champion Conference tournament champion
