= Cedar Rapids RoughRiders =

American junior ice hockey team

- City: Cedar Rapids, Iowa
- League: United States Hockey League
- Conference: Eastern
- Founded: 1983
- Home arena: ImOn Ice Arena
- Colors: Green, white, black
- General manager: Mark Carlson
- Head coach: Mark Carlson

Franchise history
- 1983–1999: North Iowa Huskies
- 1999–present: Cedar Rapids RoughRiders

Championships
- Regular season titles: 3 Anderson Cups (2004–05, 2010–11, 2015–16)
- Playoff championships: 1 Clark Cup (2005)

The Cedar Rapids RoughRiders are a junior ice hockey team playing in the United States Hockey League (USHL). Before moving to Cedar Rapids, Iowa, in 1999, the team was based in Mason City, where they were known as the North Iowa Huskies.

The RoughRiders' home ice is the ImOn Ice Arena also known as The Stable.

== History ==
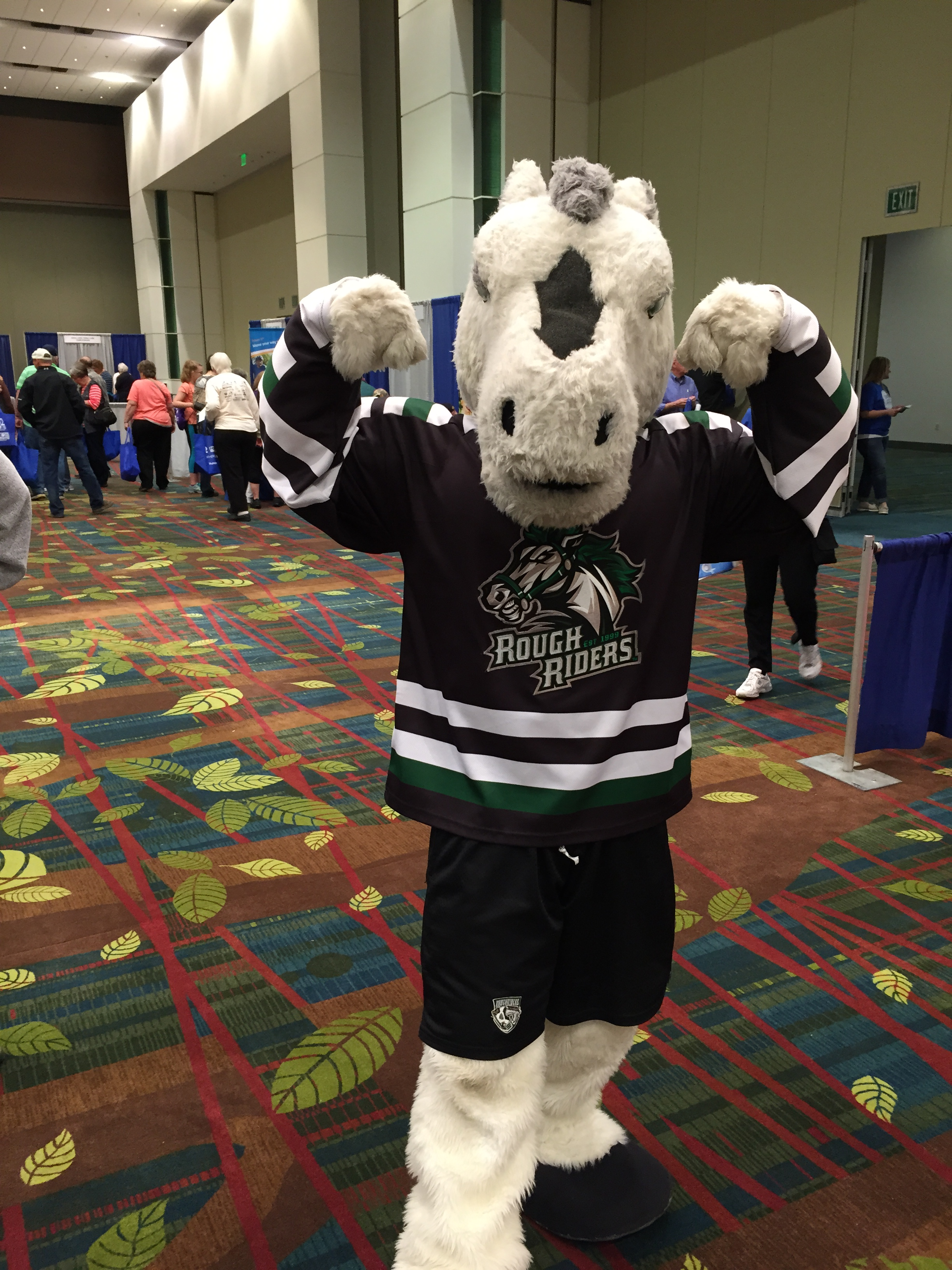
Cedar Rapids RoughRiders mascot Ricochet.

The North Iowa Huskies relocated to Cedar Rapids in 1999. The RoughRiders' new name was chosen in a name-the-team contest won by a local teacher at Roosevelt Middle School in Cedar Rapids as it was the school's mascot.

In the 2002–03 season, the Roughriders finished in second place in the East Division with a 27–26–7 record. In the quarterfinals of the playoffs, the Roughriders beat the Topeka ScareCrows 3-games-to-1 before being swept 3–0 by the Lincoln Stars. After another second place division finish in 2003–04, the Roughriders lost in the quarterfinals to the Danville Wings.

In the 2004–05 season, the Roughriders finished first in the East Division with a record of 42 wins, 13 losses, and 5 overtime losses, for 89 points in the standings. They tied the West Division champions Omaha Lancers for the regular season overall title, the Anderson Cup. After three-game sweeps against the Indiana Ice and Chicago Steel, the Roughriders faced the Sioux City Musketeers winning game one of the Clark Cup finals 5–0, but lost game two, 1–2. After splitting games in Sioux City, the Roughriders finally defeated the Musketeers at home 4–1, to win their first Clark Cup championship. Goaltender Alex Stalock took most valuable player honors for the series. Future NHL players who played on this championship team included: Teddy Purcell, Justin Abdelkader, Alec Martinez, and Alex Stalock. In postseason awards, Roughriders' coach Mark Carlson was named Coach of the Year, and two Roughriders were named to the All-USHL second team.

The following season, the Roughriders won the Eastern Division regular season top playoff position based on goal differential against the Des Moines Buccaneers when both compiled 33 wins, 21 losses, and 6 overtime losses. The Roughriders also won the Corridor Cup against the Waterloo Black Hawks. In the playoffs, the Roughriders won the division semifinals against the Indiana Ice, 3-games-to-2, before bowing to eventual Clark Cup champion Des Moines in a three-game sweep. Roughriders' player Chad Costello finished on top of the league scoring race with 76 points, and teammate Teddy Purcell finished on top of the assists list with 52.

The 2006–07 season had the Roughriders finish in second place in the East Division with a 37–18–5 record. They defeated the Ohio Junior Blue Jackets in a four-game sweep bin the first round but lost both their round-robin games and were eliminated from the playoffs. In 2007–08, the Roughriders finished in third place in the East Division with a 33–22–5 record and were led in net with Brady Hjelle. The Roughriders were swept in the first round of the playoffs by the Waterloo Black Hawks three-games-to-none. The Roughriders would continue to lose in the first round of the playoffs over the next two seasons.

The Roughriders would again finish in first place in the Eastern Conference and capturing their second Anderson Cup during the 2010–11 season. In the playoffs, the Roughriders beat Muskegon in the quarterfinals 3-games-to-1, but lost in the conference semifinals to Green Bay in four games.

After the 2012–13 season, the Roughriders failed to qualify for the playoffs for the first time since their inaugural 1999–2000 season in Cedar Rapids. They finished in sixth place in the East Division with a 25–30–9 record for a total of 59 points. The Roughriders would bounce back, finishing in second place in the Eastern Conference in both the 2013–14 and 2014–15 seasons. However, they lost in the first round in the playoffs against the Dubuque Fighting Saints both seasons.

In the 2015–16 season, the Roughriders finished in first place in the league with a 40–15–5 record for a total of 85 points and capturing the franchise's third Anderson Cup. The Roughriders continued to struggle in the playoffs and lost to the Bloomington Thunder three-games-to-two in the first round. The Roughriders failed to qualify in the following 2016–17 season after a last place finish in the Eastern Conference.

In 2020 and the midst of the COVID-19 pandemic that curtailed the 2019–20 USHL season, the RoughRiders' home arena was damaged during the August 10 derecho, forcing the team to suspend operations for at least the 2020–21 season.
