= Bob Ferguson (ice hockey) =

Canadian ice hockey player and coach

- Born: October 19, 1954 (age 71) Kingston, Ontario, Canada
- Height: 6 ft 0 in (183 cm)
- Weight: 185 lb (84 kg; 13 st 3 lb)
- Position: Centre
- Played for: Tucson Icemen (SWHL); Sioux City Musketeers (USHL); Utica Mohawks (EHL); Salem Raiders (EHL)
- NHL draft: 163rd overall, 1974; New York Islanders
- WHA draft: 96th overall, 1975; Winnipeg Jets
- Playing career: 1976–1981

Bob Ferguson (born October 19, 1954) is a Canadian former professional ice hockey player and coach.

== Career ==
Ferguson was selected by the New York Islanders in the 10th round (163rd overall) of the 1974 NHL amateur draft and was also drafted by the Winnipeg Jets in the 7th round (96th overall) of the 1974 WHA Amateur Draft.

Ferguson is a two-time winner of the John Brophy Award given to the ECHL coach of the year.

== Awards and honors ==
Award	Year
John Brophy Award – ECHL Coach of the Year	1998–99
John Brophy Award – ECHL Coach of the Year	1999–2000
