= List of USHL award winners =

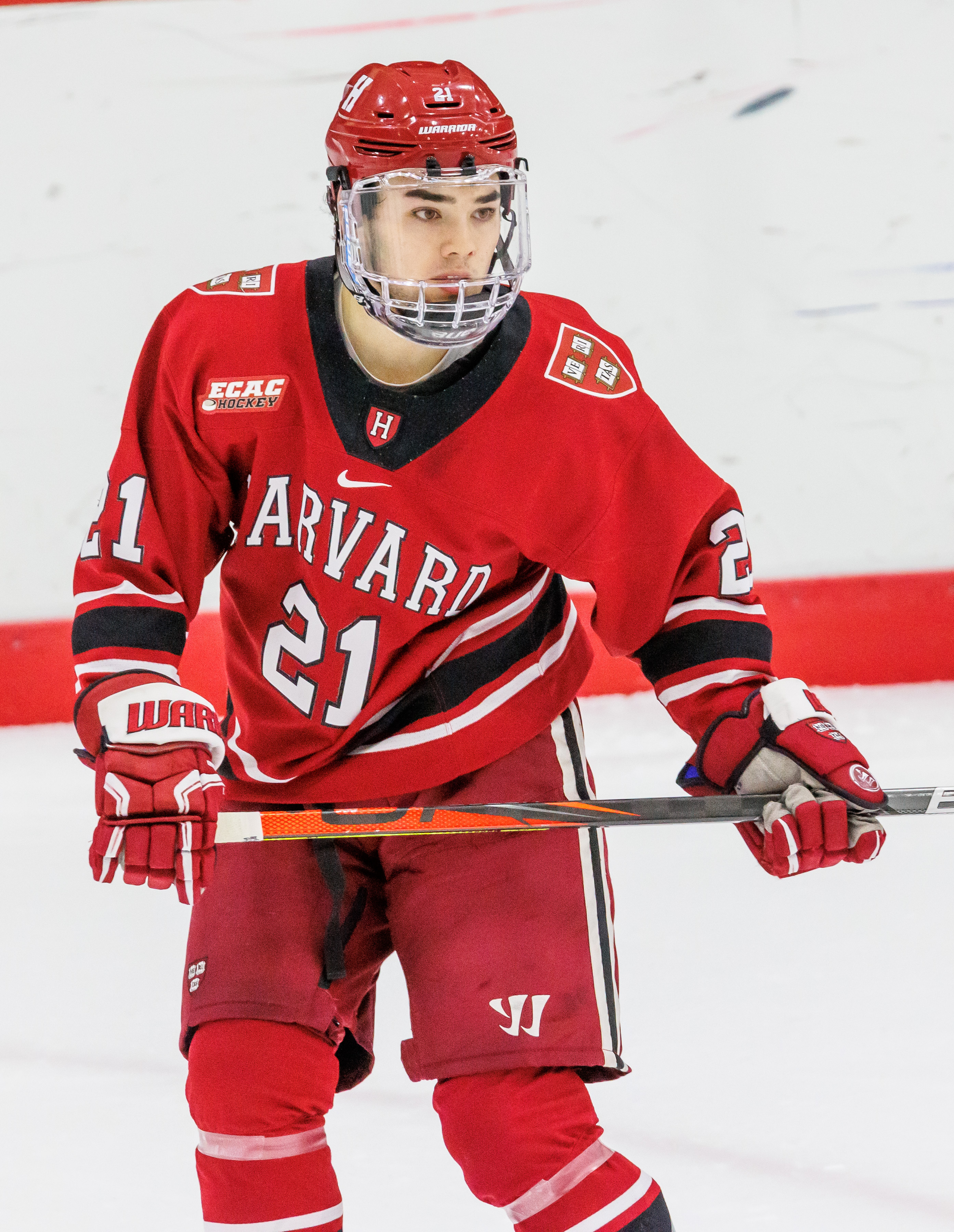
Sean Farrell, 2020–21 USHL Player of the Year, and 2020–21 Dave Tyler Junior Player of the Year

List of United States Hockey League award winners.

== Player awards ==
=== USHL Player of the Year ===
| Season | Player | Team |
|---|---|---|
| 1983–84 | Jay Cates | St. Paul |
| 1984–85 | Scott Shoffstall | Sioux City |
| 1985–86 | Tim Ferguson | Sioux City |
| 1986–87 | Terry Menard | Thunder Bay |
| 1987–88 | Mike O'Hara | Rochester |
| 1988–89 | Mark Karpen | North Iowa |
| 1989–90 | Kurt Miller | Rochester |
| 1990–91 | Gary Kitching | Thunder Bay |
| 1991–92 | Peter Ferraro | Waterloo |
| 1992–93 | Eric Rud | Des Moines |
| 1993–94 | Jason Blake | Waterloo |
| 1994–95 | Scott Swanson | Omaha |
| 1995–96 | Jeff Panzer | Fargo-Moorhead |
| 1995–96 | Matt Noga | North Iowa |
| 1996–97 | Karl Goehring | Fargo-Moorhead |
| 1997–98 | Nate DiCasmirro | North Iowa |
| 1998–99 | Pete Fregoe | Des Moines |
| 1999–00 | Dan Ellis | Omaha |
| 2000–01 | Chris Fournier | Lincoln |
| 2001–02 | Bobby Goepfert | Cedar Rapids |
| 2002–03 | Ryan Potulny | Lincoln |
| 2003–04 | Mike Howe | River City |
| 2004–05 | Jeff Lerg | Omaha |
| 2005–06 | Trevor Lewis | Des Moines |
| 2006–07 | Phil DeSimone | Sioux City |
| 2007–08 | Jason Gregoire | Lincoln |
| 2008–09 | Andrew Miller | Chicago |
| 2009–10 | Matt White | Omaha |
| 2010–11 | Blake Coleman | Indiana |
| 2011–12 | Kevin Roy | Lincoln |
| 2012–13 | Taylor Cammarata | Waterloo |
| 2013–14 | Brandon Montour | Waterloo |
| 2014–15 | Kyle Connor | Youngstown |
| 2015–16 | Rem Pitlick | Muskegon |
| 2016–17 | Matīss Kivlenieks | Sioux City |
| 2017–18 | Anthony Del Gaizo | Muskegon |
| 2018–19 | Ronnie Attard | Tri-City |
| 2019–20 | Riese Gaber | Dubuque |
| 2020–21 | Sean Farrell | Chicago |
| 2021–22 | Mitchell Miller | Tri-City |
| 2022-23 | Macklin Celebrini | Chicago |
| 2023–24 | Mac Swanson | Fargo |
| 2024-25 | Will Zellers | Green Bay |
| 2025-26 | Alex Pelletier | Lincoln |

=== USHL Rookie of the Year ===
| Season | Player | Team |
|---|---|---|
| 1993–94 | Terry Jarkowsky | Waterloo |
| 1996–97 | Karl Goehring | Fargo-Moorhead |
| 1997–98 | Mark Cullen | Fargo-Moorhead |
| 1998–99 | Tyler Palmiscno | Sioux City |
| 1999–00 | Troy Riddle | Des Moines |
| 2000–01 | Brandon Bochenski | Lincoln |
| 2001–02 | Danny Richmond | Chicago |
| 2002–03 | Joe Pavelski | Waterloo |
| 2003–04 | Matt Ford | Sioux Falls |
| 2004–05 | Chad Rau | Des Moines |
| 2005–06 | Kyle Okposo | Des Moines |
| 2006–07 | Max Pacioretty | Sioux City |
| 2007–08 | Jack Connolly | Sioux Falls |
| 2008–09 | Louis Leblanc | Omaha |
| 2009–10 | Anders Lee | Green Bay |
| 2010–11 | John Gaudreau | Dubuque |
| 2011–12 | Taylor Cammarata | Waterloo |
| 2012–13 | Jake Guentzel | Sioux City |
| 2013–14 | Robby Jackson | Chicago |
| 2014–15 | Kieffer Bellows | Sioux Falls |
| 2015–16 | Cameron Morrison | Youngstown |
| 2016–17 | Andrei Svechnikov | Muskegon |
| 2017–18 | Matej Pekar | Muskegon |
| 2018–19 | Zac Jones | Tri-City |
| 2019–20 | Brendan Brisson | Chicago |
| 2020–21 | Cole Sillinger | Sioux Falls |
| 2021–22 | Dylan James | Sioux City |
| 2022–23 | Macklin Celebrini | Chicago |
| 2023–24 | John Mustard | Waterloo |
| 2024–25 | Ryker Lee | Madison |

=== Forward of the Year ===
| Season | Player | Team |
|---|---|---|
| 1983–84 | Jay Cates | St. Paul |
| 1984–85 | Scott Shoffstall | Sioux City |
| 1985–86 | Tim Ferguson | Sioux City |
| 1986–87 | Terry Menard | Thunder Bay |
| 1987–88 | Bob Nardella | Des Moines |
| 1988–89 | Greg Johnson | Thunder Bay |
| 1989–90 | Kurt Miller | Rochester |
| 1990–91 | Chris Ferraro | Dubuque |
| 1991–92 | Peter Ferraro | Waterloo |
| 1992–93 | Neil Donovan | Omaha |
| 1993–94 | Jason Blake | Waterloo |
| 1994–95 | David Hoogsteen | Thunder Bay |
| 1995–96 | Jeff Panzer | Fargo-Moorhead |
| 1996–97 | Mike Lephart | Omaha |
| 1997–98 | Nate DiCasmirro | North Iowa |
| 1998–99 | Pete Fregoe | Des Moines |
| 1999–00 | Peter Sejna | Des Moines |
| 2000–01 | Chris Fournier | Lincoln |
| 2001–02 | Vince Bellissimo | Topeka |
| 2002–03 | Ryan Potulny | Lincoln |
| 2003–04 | Mike Howe | River City |
| 2004–05 | Dan Riedel | Lincoln |
| 2005–06 | Trevor Lewis | Des Moines |
| 2006–07 | Phil DeSimone | Sioux City |
| 2007–08 | Jason Gregoire | Lincoln |
| 2008–09 | Andrew Miller | Chicago |
| 2009–10 | Jaden Schwartz | Tri-City |
| 2010–11 | Blake Coleman | Indiana |
| 2011–12 | Kevin Roy | Lincoln |
| 2012–13 | Taylor Cammarata | Waterloo |
| 2013–14 | Jake Randolph | Omaha |
| 2014–15 | Kyle Connor | Youngstown |
| 2015–16 | Rem Pitlick | Muskegon |
| 2016–17 | Zach Solow | Dubuque |
| 2017–18 | Jackson Cates | Waterloo |
| 2018–19 | Bobby Brink | Sioux City |
| 2019–20 | Riese Gaber | Dubuque |
| 2020–21 | Matthew Coronato | Chicago |
| 2021–22 | Jeremy Wilmer | Tri-City |
| 2022–23 | Macklin Celebrini | Chicago |
| 2023–24 | Mac Swanson | Fargo |
| 2024–25 | Will Zellers | Green Bay |

=== Defenseman of the Year ===
| Season | Player | Team |
|---|---|---|
| 1983–84 | Doug Clagger | Dubuque |
| 1984–85 | Mike Castellano | Austin |
| 1985–86 | Kord Cernick | Dubuque |
| 1986–87 | Darren Sheehan | Thunder Bay |
| 1987–88 | Chris Nelson | Rochester |
| 1988–89 | Mark Peterson | St. Paul |
| 1989–90 | John Gruden | Waterloo |
| 1990–91 | Paul Koch | Omaha |
| 1991–92 | Andrew Backen | Thunder Bay |
| 1992–93 | Eric Rud | Des Moines |
| 1993–94 | Dave Dupont | Des Moines |
| 1994–95 | Scott Swanson | Omaha |
| 1995–96 | Josh DeWolf | St. Paul |
| 1995–96 | Dan Peters | Omaha |
| 1996–97 | Doug Schmidt | Waterloo |
| 1997–98 | Jason Basile | Des Moines |
| 1998–99 | Tom Preissing | Green Bay |
| 1999–00 | Jeff Finger | Green Bay |
| 2000–01 | Jamie Mattie | Sioux Falls |
| 2001–02 | Brett Skinner | Des Moines |
| 2002–03 | Matt Carle | River City |
| 2003–04 | Mike Hodgson | Sioux City |
| 2004–05 | Brett Motherwell | Omaha |
| 2005–06 | Nick Schaus | Omaha |
| 2006–07 | Jeff Petry | Des Moines |
| 2007–08 | Blake Kessel | Waterloo |
| 2008–09 | John Moore | Chicago |
| 2009–10 | David Makowski | Green Bay |
| 2010–11 | Nick Mattson | Indiana |
| 2011–12 | Andy Welinski | Green Bay |
| 2012–13 | Paul LaDue | Lincoln |
| 2013–14 | Brandon Montour | Waterloo |
| 2014–15 | Neal Pionk | Sioux City |
| 2015–16 | Jack Ahcan | Cedar Rapids |
| 2016–17 | Connor Mackey | Green Bay |
| 2017–18 | Ben Finkelstein | Waterloo |
| 2018–19 | Ronnie Attard | Tri-City |
| 2019–20 | Owen Power | Chicago |
| 2020–21 | Mason Lohrei | Green Bay |
| 2021–22 | Mitchell Miller | Tri-City |
| 2022–23 | Eric Pohlkamp | Cedar Rapids |
| 2023–24 | Leo Gruba | Fargo |
| 2024–25 | Luke Osburn | Youngstown |

=== Goaltender of the Year ===
| Season | Player | Team |
|---|---|---|
| 1983–84 | Craig Shermoen | St. Paul |
| 1984–85 | Chad Meyhoff | Austin |
| 1985–86 | Chad Meyhoff | Rochester |
| 1986–87 | Pat Sztrum | Thunder Bay |
| 1987–88 | Mike O'Hara | Rochester |
| 1988–89 | Corey Chwialkowski | Rochester |
| 1989–90 | Jeff Levy | Rochester |
| 1990–91 | Chris Burns | Thunder Bay |
| 1991–92 | Paul Sass | Des Moines |
| 1992–93 | Bob Petrie | Omaha |
| 1993–94 | Terry Jarkowsky | Waterloo |
| 1994–95 | Aaron Vicker | Omaha |
| 1995–96 | Mike Correia | Omaha |
| 1996–97 | Karl Goehring | Fargo-Moorhead |
| 1997–98 | Josh Blackburn | Lincoln |
| 1998–99 | Tony Zasowski | Omaha |
| 1999–00 | Dan Ellis | Omaha |
| 2000–01 | Jure Penko | Green Bay |
| 2001–02 | Bobby Goepfert | Cedar Rapids |
| 2002–03 | Dominic Vicari | River City |
| 2003–04 | Phil Lamoureux | Lincoln |
| 2004–05 | Jeff Lerg | Omaha |
| 2005–06 | Alex Stalock | Cedar Rapids |
| 2006–07 | Drew Palmisano | Omaha |
| 2007–08 | David Reekie | Lincoln |
| 2008–09 | Mike Lee | Fargo |
| 2009–10 | Steven Summerhays | Green Bay |
| 2010–11 | Brady Hjelle | Cedar Rapids |
| 2011–12 | Ryan McKay | Green Bay |
| 2011–12 | Zane Gothberg | Fargo |
| 2012–13 | Kevin Lindskoug | Muskegon |
| 2013–14 | Hayden Hawkey | Omaha |
| 2014–15 | Eric Schierhorn | Muskegon |
| 2015–16 | Adam Húska | Green Bay |
| 2016–17 | Matīss Kivlenieks | Sioux City |
| 2017–18 | Filip Larsson | Tri-City |
| 2018–19 | Isaiah Saville | Tri-City |
| 2019–20 | Erik Portillo | Dubuque |
| 2020–21 | Akira Schmid | Sioux City |
| 2021–22 | Arsenii Sergeev | Tri-City |
| 2022–23 | Jacob Fowler | Youngstown |
| 2023–24 | Hampton Slukynsky | Fargo |
| 2024–25 | Yan Shostak | Lincoln |

=== Curt Hammer Award ===
Awarded to an USHL player for on and off the ice participation.

| Season | Player | Team |
|---|---|---|
| 1988–89 | Jay Ness | Rochester |
| 1989–90 | Sean Marson | Sioux City |
| 1990–91 | Beau Bilek | Des Moines |
| 1990–91 | Brent Cary | Omaha |
| 1991–92 | Mike Figliomeni | Thunder Bay |
| 1992–93 | Eric Rud | Des Moines |
| 1993–94 | Nick Krueger | Des Moines |
| 1994–95 | Brad Frattaroli | Des Moines |
| 1995–96 | Jeremy Bautch | Rochester |
| 1996–97 | Mark Eaton | Waterloo |
| 1997–98 | Shaun Winkler | North Iowa |
| 1998–99 | Noah Clarke | Des Moines |
| 1999–00 | Aaron Gill | Rochester |
| 2000–01 | Corey McLean | Chicago |
| 2001–02 | Nick Anderson | Chicago |
| 2002–03 | Jake Taylor | Green Bay |
| 2003–04 | Topher Scott | Chicago |
| 2004–05 | Christian Hanson | Tri-City |
| 2005–06 | Trevor Lewis | Des Moines |
| 2006–07 | Zach Redmond | Sioux Falls |
| 2007–08 | Joey Miller | Sioux City |
| 2008–09 | Mike Walsh | Chicago |
| 2009–10 | Derek Arnold | Waterloo |
| 2010–11 | Tommy Olczyk | Sioux City |
| 2011–12 | Mike Ambrosia | Youngstown |
| 2012–13 | Ryan Siiro | Sioux Falls |
| 2013–14 | Garrett Gamez | Tri-City Storm |
| 2014–15 | Matt Mendelson | Bloomington Thunder |
| 2015–16 | Tory Dello | Tri-City Storm |
| 2016–17 | Logan Halladay | Bloomington |
| 2016–17 | Riese Zmolek | Cedar Rapids |
| 2017–18 | Marc McLaughlin | Cedar Rapids |
| 2018–19 | Liam Walsh | Cedar Rapids |
| 2019–20 | Aidan Fulp | Des Moines |
| 2020–21 | Will Dineen | Sioux Falls |
| 2021–22 | Stephen Halliday | Dubuque |
| 2021–22 | Michael Cameron | Omaha |
| 2022–23 | Cole Knuble | Fargo |
| 2023–24 | Ryan Botterill | Youngstown |

=== Dave Tyler Junior Player of the Year Award ===
The Dave Tyler Junior Player of the Year Award is awarded to the top junior player in USA Hockey, but is not necessarily an USHL award. Those listed are only the USHL players that have won the award.

| Season | Player | Team |
|---|---|---|
| 1993–94 | Jason Blake | Waterloo Black Hawks |
| 1996–97 | Karl Goehring | Fargo-Moorhead Ice Sharks |
| 1997–98 | Nate DiCasmirro | North Iowa Huskies |
| 1998–99 | Peter Fregoe | Des Moines Buccaneers |
| 1999–00 | Aaron Smith | Green Bay Gamblers |
| 2000–01 | Chris Fournier | Lincoln Stars |
| 2002–03 | Ryan Potulny | Lincoln Stars |
| 2003–04 | Joe Pavelski | Waterloo Black Hawks |
| 2004–05 | Jeff Lerg | Omaha Lancers |
| 2005–06 | Trevor Lewis | Des Moines Buccaneers |
| 2006–07 | Jeff Petry | Des Moines Buccaneers |
| 2007–08 | Jack Connolly | Sioux Falls Stampede |
| 2008–09 | Andrew Miller | Chicago Steel |
| 2009–10 | Matt White | Omaha Lancers |
| 2010–11 | Blake Coleman | Indiana Ice |
| 2011–12 | Andy Welinski | Green Bay Gamblers |
| 2012–13 | Taylor Cammarata | Waterloo Black Hawks |
| 2013–14 | Tucker Poolman | Omaha Lancers |
| 2014–15 | Kyle Connor | Youngstown Phantoms |
| 2015–16 | Rem Pitlick | Muskegon Lumberjacks |
| 2016–17 | Zach Solow | Dubuque Fighting Saints |
| 2017–18 | Jack Hughes | Team USA |
| 2018–19 | Ronnie Attard | Tri-City Storm |
| 2019–20 | Jake Sanderson | Team USA |
| 2020–21 | Sean Farrell | Chicago Steel |
| 2021–22 | Connor Kurth | Dubuque Fighting Saints |
| 2022–23 | Cole Knuble | Fargo Force |

== Staff awards ==
=== Coach of the Year ===
| Season | Winner | Team |
|---|---|---|
| 1983–84 | Kevin Hartzell | St. Paul |
| 1984–85 | Frank Serratore | Austin |
| 1985–86 | Bob Ferguson | Sioux City |
| 1986–87 | Dave Siciliano | Thunder Bay |
| 1987–88 | Scott Owens | Madison |
| 1988–89 | Dave Siciliano | Thunder Bay |
| 1989–90 | Bob Ferguson | Sioux City |
| 1990–91 | Dave Siciliano | Thunder Bay |
| 1991–92 | Mike Guentzel | St. Paul |
| 1991–92 | Bob Ferguson | Des Moines |
| 1992–93 | Mike Guentzel | Omaha |
| 1993–94 | Scott Mikesch | Waterloo |
| 1994–95 | Bob Ferguson | Des Moines |
| 1995–96 | Steve Johnson | Fargo-Moorhead |
| 1996–97 | Mike Hastings | Omaha |
| 1997–98 | Dave Hakstol | Sioux City |
| 1998–99 | Mark Osiecki | Green Bay |
| 1999–00 | Steve Johnson | Lincoln |
| 2000–01 | Steve Johnson | Lincoln |
| 2001–02 | Mike Hastings | River City |
| 2002–03 | P. K. O'Handley | Waterloo |
| 2003–04 | Wil Nichol | Chicago |
| 2004–05 | Mark Carlson | Cedar Rapids |
| 2005–06 | Kevin Hartzell | Sioux Falls |
| 2006–07 | P. K. O'Handley | Waterloo |
| 2007–08 | Steve Poapst | Chicago |
| 2008–09 | Dean Blais | Fargo |
| 2009–10 | Jon Cooper | Green Bay |
| 2010–11 | Mark Carlson | Cedar Rapids |
| 2011–12 | Derek Lalonde | Green Bay |
| 2012–13 | Cary Eades | Sioux Falls |
| 2013–14 | P. K. O'Handley | Waterloo |
| 2014–15 | Anthony Noreen | Youngstown |
| 2015–16 | Mark Carlson | Cedar Rapids |
| 2016–17 | Jay Varady | Sioux City |
| 2017–18 | P.K. O'Handley | Waterloo |
| 2018–19 | Anthony Noreen | Tri-City |
| 2019–20 | Oliver David | Dubuque |
| 2020–21 | Mike Hamilton | Muskegon |
| 2021–22 | Anthony Noreen | Tri-City |
| 2022–23 | Nick Oliver | Fargo |
| 2023–24 | Brett Skinner | Fargo |

=== General Manager of the Year ===
| Season | Winner | Team |
|---|---|---|
| 1982–83 | Jack Barzee | Dubuque |
| 1983–84 | Ron Woodey | St. Paul |
| 1984–85 | Frank Serratore | Austin |
| 1985–86 | Bob Ferguson | Sioux City |
| 1986–87 | Scott Owens | Madison |
| 1987–88 | Mark Janes | Rochester |
| 1988–89 | Bob Motzko | North Iowa |
| 1989–90 | Frank Serratore | Rochester |
| 1990–91 | Bob Ferguson | Des Moines |
| 1991–92 | Bob Ferguson | Des Moines |
| 1991–92 | Cary Eades | Dubuque |
| 1992–93 | Bob Ferguson | Des Moines |
| 1993–1996 | Not awarded | |
| 1996–97 | Mike Hastings | Omaha |
| 1997–98 | Scott Owens | Des Moines |
| 1998–99 | Scott Owens | Des Moines |
| 1999–00 | Bob Motzko | Sioux Falls |
| 2000–01 | Steve Johnson | Lincoln |
| 2001–02 | Mike Hastings | River City |
| 2002–03 | P. K. O'Handley | Waterloo |
| 2003–04 | Bliss Littler | Tri-City |
| 2004–05 | Mike Hastings | Omaha |
| 2005–06 | Regg Simon | Des Moines |
| 2006–07 | Mike Hastings | Omaha |
| 2007–08 | Mike Hastings | Omaha |
| 2008–09 | Jon Cooper | Green Bay |
| 2009–10 | Jon Cooper | Green Bay |
| 2010–11 | Jim Montgomery | Dubuque |
| 2011–12 | P. K. O'Handley | Waterloo |
| 2012–13 | Jim Montgomery | Dubuque |
| 2013–14 | Jeff Brown | Indiana |
| 2014–15 | Jim Hulton | Tri-City |
| 2015–16 | Jon Hull | Lincoln |
| 2016–17 | Mark LeRose | Sioux City |
| 2017–18 | P.K. O'Handley | Waterloo |
| 2018–19 | Ryan Hardy | Chicago |
| 2019–20 | Kalle Larsson | Dubuque |
| 2020–21 | Ryan Hardy | Chicago |
| 2021–22 | Andy Johnson | Sioux City |
| 2022–23 | Bryn Chyzyk | Waterloo |
| 2023–24 | Cary Eades | Fargo |

=== Organization of the Year ===
| Season | Team |
|---|---|
| 1993–94 | Omaha Lancers |
| 1994–95 | Des Moines Buccaneers |
| 1995–96 | Green Bay Gamblers |
| 1996–97 | Lincoln Stars |
| 1997–98 | Des Moines Buccaneers |
| 1998–99 | Des Moines Buccaneers |
| 1999–00 | Lincoln Stars |
| 2000–01 | Tri-City Storm |
| 2001–02 | Sioux Falls Stampede |
| 2002–03 | Waterloo Black Hawks |
| 2003–04 | Tri-City Storm |
| 2004–05 | Waterloo Black Hawks |
| 2005–06 | Sioux Falls Stampede |
| 2006–07 | Waterloo Black Hawks |
| 2007–08 | Indiana Ice |
| 2008–09 | Fargo Force |
| 2009–10 | Omaha Lancers |
| 2010–11 | Cedar Rapids RoughRiders |
| 2011–12 | Green Bay Gamblers |
| 2012–13 | Fargo Force |
| 2013–14 | Sioux Falls Stampede |
| 2014–15 | Sioux Falls Stampede |
| 2015–16 | Tri-City Storm |
| 2017–18 | Sioux Falls Stampede |
| 2018–19 | Muskegon Lumberjacks |
| 2019–20 | Sioux Falls Stampede |
| 2020–21 | All member organizations |
| 2021–22 | Not awarded |
| 2022–23 | Youngstown Phantoms |

== Sources ==
- 2023–24 USHL Media Guide
- Awards at USHL.com
