= North Iowa Huskies =

- City: Mason City, Iowa
- League: USHL
- Conference: Central
- Founded: 1983
- Folded: 1999
- Home arena: North Iowa Ice Arena
- Colors: Blue, orange, white (1983-1995) Blue, green, white (1995-1999)

Franchise history
- 1983–1999: North Iowa Huskies
- 1999–Present: Cedar Rapids RoughRiders

The North Iowa Huskies were a junior ice hockey team based in Mason City, Iowa. They were a member of the United States Hockey League from 1983 to 1999. They played their home games at North Iowa Ice Arena. They would move to Cedar Rapids and became the Cedar Rapids RoughRiders after the 1998–99 season.

== History ==
=== Beginning ===
The team was founded in 1983, being the eighth team in the USHL at that time.

The USHL was questioning if the team would meet the deadline of April 15 to make it into the 1985–86 USHL season. At the time the USHL did not demand its teams prove there solvency, but the Mason city organization decided to self impose a figure of 10,000 dollars for operating expenses, before it even notified the USHL that the Huskies would be back in 1985–86.

On the ice the team was bad to mediocre, The first few years were mediocre to bad, often finishing in the bottom half. It was not until the 1988-89 USHL season when the team finished in the top half for the first time, when the team did make it to the playoffs during this era, the team would be knocked out in the quarter finals round to teams like the Rochester Mustangs The Thunder Bay Flyers and the Des Moines Buccaneers.

=== The "best" era ===
It was not until the 1995–96 USHL season when the team began to get "better", finishing fourth in the league, but was knocked out by the Rochester Mustangs in the quarterfinals.

In the 1996–97 USHL season the team was placed in the north division and finished third, but in the playoffs they beat the Des Moines Buccaneers 4 to 1 to make it to the semi-finals for the first time. The team lost to the Green Bay Gamblers 3 to 4.

The 1997–98 USHL season was the best season in the franchise history, they finished first in the north division and they were the number one team in the north division in the playoffs. They beat the Waterloo Black Hawks 4 to 1, but they lost to the Omaha Lancers 2 to 4.

In their final year, they were placed in the central division and finished last with only 18 wins.

=== The end ===
With a 40.7 win percentage, low game attendance, and Mason City's small population, the team's owner decided to relocate the team to Cedar Rapids, Iowa. It became the Cedar Rapids RoughRiders, ending the North Iowa Huskies team after 16 years of existence.

Mason City would later host the North Iowa Outlaws and North Iowa Bulls.
