= Rochester Mustangs (junior) =

- City: Rochester, Minnesota
- League: United States Hockey League
- Division: North
- Founded: 1974
- Folded: 2002
- Home arena: Rochester Recreation Center
- Colors: Yellow, white, and black
- Affiliates: Rochester Mustangs

Franchise history
- 1974–1985: Austin Mavericks
- 1985–2002: Rochester Mustangs

The Rochester Mustangs were an American junior A ice hockey team that was located in Rochester, Minnesota. The Mustangs were in existence from 1986 to 2002. Prior to 1986, the organization was located in Austin, Minnesota, and was known as the Austin Mavericks. The Mavericks played from 1974 until 1977 in the Midwest Junior Hockey League, before moving to the United States Hockey League in 1978. The Mustangs played their home games in the Rochester Recreation Center, which seated approximately 2,500. The Recreation Center was home to the Mustangs for 17 years. The team ceased operations at the end of the 2001–02 season because of poor attendance numbers and an old arena. The Mustangs won the American National Junior "A" championship in 1987, 1988, and 1998.

After ceasing operations, the dormant franchise appears to have changed hands on a number of occasions until it was purchased by the ownership of the Danville Wings, the Mervis family. The Mervis family had purchased the franchise to use as a new USHL team on the University of Illinois campus in Champaign, Illinois, and the family sold the Wings to Paul Skjodt. Skjodt relocated that team to create the Indiana Ice in 2004. The Mervis family focused on starting the Champaign team, however, the new proposed arena project never took off and the family began to look elsewhere such as La Crosse, Wisconsin, Battle Creek, Michigan, and Louisville, Kentucky. The franchise was eventually reactivated as an expansion team in 2010 as the Muskegon Lumberjacks.

== Notable alumni ==
- Keith Aldridge – competed in four games for the Dallas Stars of the NHL
- Jozef Balej – played three seasons in the NHL for the Vancouver Canucks, New York Rangers, and Montreal Canadiens
- Ralph Barahona – played six games for the Boston Bruins.
- Peter Markle – played in a World Hockey exhibition between Soviet Union and U.S.
- Shjon Podein – played in eleven NHL seasons for the Blues, Flyers, Avalanche, and Oilers.
