= Des Moines Buccaneers =

American junior ice hockey team

- City: Urbandale, Iowa
- League: United States Hockey League
- Conference: Western
- Founded: 1980
- Home arena: MidAmerican Energy Company RecPlex
- Colors: Red, blue, white
- Owners: Orchard View Sports & Entertainment
- General manager: Derek Damon
- Head coach: Derek Damon

Franchise history
- 1980–present: Des Moines Buccaneers

Championships
- Regular season titles: 4 Anderson Cups (1993–94, 1994–95, 1997–98, and 1998–99)
- Division titles: 7
- Gold Cups: 3
- Playoff championships: 4 Clark Cups (1992, 1995, 1999, and 2006)

The Des Moines Buccaneers are a junior ice hockey team in the United States Hockey League (USHL). The team has played in the Western Conference since the 2009–10 season.

== History ==
The Buccaneers began USHL play during the 1980–81 season and have played all their home games at Buccaneer Arena located in Urbandale, Iowa, outside of Des Moines. The Buccaneers have won four Anderson Cup championships (1993–94, 1994–95, 1997–98 and 1998–99) and four Clark Cup championships (1992, 1995, 1999 and 2006) in their history.

The Buccaneers also won three Gold Cups (in 1992, 1995, and 1998) for the Junior A National Championship awarded prior USA Hockey's 2001 realignment that shifted the USHL to Tier I status.

The Buccaneers have also had many players continue to play hockey after completing their USHL career in Des Moines. Many players have been given scholarships and move on to play NCAA Division I hockey, while others have gone on to play professional hockey. Most notably, Scott Clemmensen, a native of Des Moines, played for the Buccaneers before going to Boston College to play NCAA Division I hockey and then onto the New Jersey Devils and the Florida Panthers.

Clemmensen later became a co-owner of the Buccaneers as part of Orchard View Sports & Entertainment that purchased the team in 2017. Kyle Okposo, who played on the 2005–06 Clark Cup championship team prior to playing for the University of Minnesota and played 17 seasons in the National Hockey League (NHL) for the New York Islanders, Buffalo Sabres, and Florida Panthers.

In August 2024, it was announced that the team had moved to MidAmerican Energy Co. RecPlex due to a mechanical issue with preparing the ice surface at Buccaneer Arena.

== Arena ==
The Bucaneers played their home games at Buccaneer Arena since their inception. The arena, built in 1962, is nicknamed "The Madhouse on Hickman." In 2020, the arena was damaged during the August 2020 Midwest derecho and the team was forced to start the 2020–21 season at Wells Fargo Arena in downtown Des Moines.

Due to a mechanical issue with preparing the ice surface at Buccaneer Arena, the Des Moines Buccaneers currently play their home games at the MidAmerican Energy Co. RecPlex in West Des Moines.

== Season-by-season record ==
Season	GP	W	L	T	OTL	SOL	Pts	GF	GA	Finish	Playoffs
1980–81	48	23	25	0	—	—	46	240	299	2nd, South	2–3 in Clark Cup round-robin (W, 10–6 vs. Green Bay; L, 5–11 vs. Dubuque; L, 2–7 vs. St. Paul; W, 5–4 vs. Waterloo; L, 3–7 vs. Austin)
1981–82	48	18	29	1	—	—	37	265	314	6th	3–2 in Clark Cup round-robin (L, 4–6 vs. Bloomington; W, 5–2 vs. Sioux City; W, 11–5 vs. Dubuque; L, 6–7 vs. Austin; W, 9–1 vs. St. Paul); Lost Clark Cup final, 2–3 vs. Sioux City Musketeers
1982–83	48	25	22	1	—	—	51	298	309	3rd	Won quarterfinal, 3–1 vs. Bloomington Jr. Stars; Lost semifinal, 1–3 vs. Sioux City Musketeers
1983–84	48	23	21	1	3	—	50	270	259	4th	Won quarterfinal, 2–0 vs. North Iowa Huskies; Lost semifinal, 0–3 vs. St. Paul Vulcans
1984–85	48	7	37	1	3	—	18	183	255	10th	did not qualify
1985–86	48	11	36	0	1	—	23	194	331	9th	did not qualify
1986–87	48	23	20	2	3	—	51	277	241	6th	Lost quarterfinal, 0–3 vs. Madison Capitols
1987–88	48	23	19	3	3	—	52	266	270	4th	Lost quarterfinal, 0–3 vs. Madison Capitols
1988–89	48	18	27	1	2	—	39	250	276	6th	Lost quarterfinal, 0–3 vs. Madison Capitols
1989–90	48	17	29	2	0	—	36	216	297	8th	Lost quarterfinal, 0–3 vs. Omaha Lancers
1990–91	48	28	13	2	5	—	63	247	187	T-2nd, USHL	Lost quarterfinal, 2–3 vs. Dubuque Fighting Saints
1991–92	48	35	10	2	1	—	73	291	157	2nd, USHL	Won quarterfinal, 3–0 vs. Sioux City Musketeers; Won semifinal, 3–2 vs. St. Paul Vulcans; Won Clark Cup final, 3–1 vs. Dubuque Fighting Saints
1992–93	48	33	11	4	0	—	70	231	171	2nd, USHL	Won quarterfinal, 3–0 vs. Waterloo Black Hawks; Lost semifinal, 0–3 vs. Dubuque Fighting Saints
1993–94	48	36	12	0	0	—	72	231	150	1st, USHL	Won quarterfinal, 4–0 vs. Rochester Mustangs; Won semifinal, 3–0 vs. St. Paul Vulcans; Lost Clark Cup final, 2–3 vs. Omaha Lancers
1994–95	48	38	5	5	0	—	81	290	144	1st, USHL	Won quarterfinal, 4–0 vs. North Iowa Huskies; Won semifinal, 3–0 vs. Dubuque Fighting Saints; Won Clark Cup final, 3–2 vs. Omaha Lancers
1995–96	46	21	21	2	2	—	46	177	174	7th, USHL	Won quarterfinal, 4–2 vs. Omaha Lancers; Lost semifinal, 1–4 vs. Rochester Mustangs
1996–97	54	37	13	—	4	—	78	245	168	3rd, South	Lost quarterfinal, 1–4 vs. North Iowa Huskies
1997–98	56	40	14	—	2	—	82	226	148	1st, South	Won quarterfinal, 4–0 vs. Green Bay Gamblers; Won semifinal, 4–0 vs. Lincoln Stars; Lost Clark Cup final, 0–4 vs. Omaha Lancers
1998–99	56	48	7	—	1	—	97	304	133	1st, Central	Won quarterfinal, 3–0 vs. Twin City Vulcans; Won semifinal 3–2 vs. Lincoln Stars; Won Clark Cup final, 4–2 vs. Omaha Lancers
1999–2000	58	35	20	—	—	3	73	220	196	4th, West	Won quarterfinal, 3–1 vs. Omaha Lancers; Lost semifinal, 2–3 vs. Green Bay Gamblers
2000–01	56	32	21	—	3	—	67	195	190	4th, West	Lost quarterfinal, 0–3 vs. Omaha Lancers
2001–02	61	32	24	—	5	—	69	222	202	3rd, East	Lost quarterfinal, 0–3 vs. Green Bay Gamblers
2002–03	60	27	27	—	2	4	60	200	223	3rd, East	Lost quarterfinal, 1–3 vs. Waterloo Black Hawks
2003–04	60	29	26	—	1	4	63	202	200	4th, West	Lost quarterfinal, 0–3 vs. Tri-City Storm
2004–05	60	17	37	—	2	4	40	174	244	6th, East	did not qualify
2005–06	60	33	21	—	3	3	72	208	173	T-1st, East	Won quarterfinal, 3–0 vs. Omaha Lancers; Won semifinal, 3–0 vs. Cedar Rapids RoughRiders; Won Clark Cup final, 3–2 vs. Sioux Falls Stampede
2006–07	60	29	21	—	1	9	68	215	206	6th, West	Won first round, 3–2 vs. Omaha Lancers; 2–0 in round-robin (W, 3–0 vs. Tri-City; W, 3–2 vs. Sioux Falls); Lost semifinal game, 0–1 OT vs. Waterloo Black Hawks
2007–08	60	14	40	—	2	4	34	134	213	6th, West	did not qualify
2008–09	60	12	43	—	2	3	29	167	283	6th, East	did not qualify
2009–10	60	20	34	—	4	2	40	143	220	6th, West	did not qualify
2010–11	60	29	25	—	2	4	64	174	177	7th, West	did not qualify
2011–12	60	20	33	—	1	6	47	168	215	7th, West	did not qualify
2012–13	64	25	35	—	1	3	54	189	245	7th, West	did not qualify
2013–14	60	20	32	—	2	6	48	154	208	6th, West	did not qualify
2014–15	60	21	26	—	6	7	55	164	204	7th, West	did not qualify
2015–16	60	25	30	—	5	0	55	165	205	7th, West	did not qualify
2016–17	60	36	20	—	1	3	76	177	154	4th, West	Lost quarterfinal, 0–3 vs. Sioux City Musketeers
2017–18	60	20	33	—	4	3	47	145	199	8th, West	did not qualify
2018–19	62	35	22	—	1	4	75	202	177	4th, West	Won first round, 2–0 vs. Fargo Force; Lost conference semifinal, 0–3 vs. Tri-City Storm
2019–20	47	21	23	—	1	2	45	147	174	7th, West	season cancelled
2020–21	51	26	21	—	4	0	56	158	152	5th, West	did not qualify
2021–22	62	18	39	—	3	2	41	166	238	8th, West	did not qualify
2022–23	62	25	28	—	5	4	59	167	194	6th, West	Lost first round, 0–2 vs. Lincoln Stars
2023–24	60	24	29	—	5	2	55	176	198	7th, West	did not qualify
2024–25	62	25	32	—	5	0	55	181	223	7th, West	did not qualify
2025–26	62	27	27	—	4	4	62	188	190	4th, West	Lost first round, 1–2 vs. Lincoln Stars

=== Gold Cup tournament ===
The Gold Cup was the USA Hockey Junior A National Championship that the USHL participated in at the end of the season against the regular season and playoff champions of the other Junior A leagues. The USHL stopped participation in the tournament after USA Hockey realigned its designations and the USHL became a Tier I league in 2001. The Gold Cup was discontinued after the 2003 tournament when the remaining Tier II Junior A leagues merged. Des Moines participated in five Gold Cup tournaments and won three Junior A National Championships.

Year	Round-Robin	Record	Semifinal Game	Championship Game
1992	W, 8–4 vs. Detroit Jr. Red Wings (NAHL); W, 7–4 vs. Detroit Compuware Ambassadors (NAHL); W, 5–3 vs. Indianapolis Jr. Ice (NAHL)	3–0–0	Not held	W, 9–1 vs. Detroit Compuware Ambassadors (NAHL); Won Gold Cup
1994	W, 9–5 vs. Kalamazoo Jr. Wings (NAHL); OTL, 5–6 (3OT) vs. Detroit Compuware (NAHL); L, 3–4 vs. Niagara Scenic (NAHL)	1–1–1	did not advance	
1995	W, 6–1 vs. Springfield Jr. Blues (NAHL); W, 6–2 vs. Detroit Freeze (NAHL); W, 5–1 vs. Compuware Ambassadors (NAHL)	3–0–0	W, 3–2 (2OT) vs. Dubuque Fighting Saints (USHL)	W, 5–4 (OT) vs. Omaha Lancers (USHL); Won Gold Cup
1998	W, 6–3 vs. Billings Bulls (AFHL); W, 7–1 vs. Bozeman Icedogs (AFHL); W, 3–2 (OT) vs. Detroit Compuware (NAHL)	3–0–0	W, 4–2 vs. Springfield Jr. Blues (NAHL)	W, 2–1 vs. Omaha Lancers (USHL); Won Gold Cup
1999	W, 7–1 vs. St. Louis Sting (NAHL); W, 8–1 vs. Billings Bulls (AWHL); W, 3–0 vs. Compuware Ambassadors (NAHL)	3–0–0	W, 8–1 vs. Lincoln Stars (USHL)	L, 1–3 vs. Compuware Ambassadors (NAHL)

== Coaches ==
- Ivan Prediger (1980–1984) – Resigned during the 1984–85 season. Jeff Ulrich was then named interim head coach.
- Jim Wiley (1984–1990) – Replaced interim head coach Jeff Ulrich during the 1984–85 season.
- Bob Ferguson (1990–1995, 2001–2004)
- Scott Owens (1995–1999)
- Tom Carroll (1999–2001)
- Regg Simon (2004–2008, 2010–2012) – Resigned during the 2007–08 season after 45 games. Replaced by interim Todd Knott. Rehired in 2010 to replace Guentzel, but was then fired towards the end of the 2011–12 season and replaced by interim Graham Johnson.
- J. P. Parisé (2008–2009) – Replaced interim head coach Knott but kept him on as an assistant. Became general manager of the Buccaneers in 2009 and vacated the coaching position.
- Mike Guentzel (2009–2010) – Dave Allison was originally hired for the 2009–10 season but then left the team prior to coaching a game due to immigration and work-visa concerns.
- Jon Rogger (2012–2014) – Replaced interim head coach Graham Johnson.
- Dave Allison (2014–2018)
- Gene Reilly (2018–2019)
- Peter Mannino (2019–2021)
- Matt Curley (2021–2025)
- Derek Damon (2025-present)
