= Dubuque Fighting Saints (1980–2001) =

American former ice hockey team

- City: Dubuque, Iowa
- League: USHL
- Founded: 1962
- Operated: 1980–2001
- Home arena: Five Flags Center

Franchise history
- 1962–1969: Waterloo Black Hawks
- 1969–1970: Iowa Stars
- 1970–1980: Waterloo Black Hawks
- 1980–2001: Dubuque Fighting Saints

Championships
- Regular season titles: Anderson Cup; 2 (1980–81, 1982–83)
- Playoff championships: Clark Cup; 3 (1980–81, 1982–83, 1984–85)

The Dubuque Fighting Saints were a Tier I junior ice hockey team that played in the United States Hockey League (USHL) from 1980 to 2001. The team moved to Tulsa, Oklahoma to become the Tulsa Crude in 2001 citing low attendance and rising costs. A new team would use the same name when Dubuque was granted an expansion franchise in the USHL in 2010.

The Saints glory years lasted from 1980 to 1981 through to 1984–85, when they played under the coaching supervision of Jack Barzee who left to become a central figure in the National Hockey League's Central Scouting Staff, and later, received the Lester Patrick Trophy from USA Hockey and the NHL for his exceptional contribution to the development of hockey in the United States. During their first season in 1980–81, the Fighting Saints record was 52–11–2, a league record. In 1982–83, the Saints went on to win their second national championship in three years.

== History ==
Prior to 1979, the USHL was a semi-professional hockey league operating in midwestern United States. The Waterloo Black Hawks made the transition to a junior hockey team in 1979 as the league switched to junior hockey as the associated costs with paying professionals were rising. After one season, head coach and general manager, Jack Barzee, had the Black Hawks relocated to Dubuque, Iowa, and renamed the team the Fighting Saints. The team would prove to be very successful under Barzee and would win two national championships, three playoff championships, and two regular season titles before Barzee left in 1985.

After Barzee's departure, the team began to struggle on and off the ice. The team's record decreased every season until it finally finished last in 1988–89 and 1989–90 seasons. It was not until Chris and Peter Ferraro joined the team in 1990–91 did the team start to play competitively again. Coach Cary Eades took over in 1991–92 and brought the team back to contention including a National Tournament championship in 1992–93 before he left in 1993. Owner Brian Gallagher would eventually take over as head coach in the 1997–98 season and the team would only make the playoffs once in his tenure. In 2001, Gallagher announced he was moving the team to Tulsa, Oklahoma, citing rising costs and low attendance. He renamed the team the Tulsa Crude but only lasted one season before ceasing operations.

== Seasons records ==
Season	GP	W	L	T	OTL	SOL	PTS	GF	GA	PIM	Regular season results	Playoff Results
1980–81	48	38	9	1	*	*	77	351	187	--	1st of 4, Southern Conference; 1st of 8, USHL; Anderson Cup Champions	Clark Cup Champions
1981–82	48	29	19	0	*	*	58	274	232	--	2nd of 7	
1982–83	48	39	8	1	*	*	79	350	217	--	1st of 7 Anderson Cup Champions	Clark Cup Champions
1983–84	48	20	23	2	*	*	45	227	246	--	5th of 8	
1984–85	48	30	14	0	*	*	64	267	232	--	3rd of 10	Clark Cup Champions
1985–86	48	27	15	1	5	*	60	247	190	--	4th of 9	
1986–87	48	25	21	1	1	*	52	263	236	--	5th of 10	
1987–88	48	6	39	3	0	*	15	158	349	--	9th of 10	
1988–89	48	7	40	1	0	*	15	185	380	--	10th of 10	
1989–90	48	8	39	0	1	*	17	152	323	--	10th of 10	
1990–91	48	22	26	0	*	*	46	245	222	--	6th of 10	
1991–92	48	27	19	2	*	*	58	256	212	--	4th of 10	
1992–93	48	30	11	5	2	*	67	229	163	--	3rd of 10	
1993–94	48	29	17	1	1	*	61	224	177	--	5th of 10	
1994–95	48	24	18	4	2	*	54	175	169	--	6th of 11	
1995–96	46	15	28	1	2	*	33	145	214	--	10th of 11	
1996–97	54	17	34	0	3	*	37	157	211	1700	4th of 6, South Division	Did not qualify
1997–98	54	19	36	*	0	1	30	159	238	1657	6th of 6, South Division	Did not qualify
1998–99	56	22	32	0	2	*	46	164	217	1232	3rd of 4, East Division	Lost Quarterfinals 0–3 to Omaha Lancers
1999–00	58	16	39	*	*	3	35	141	230	1248	7th of 7, East Division	Did not qualify
2000–01	56	15	37	0	4	*	34	148	219	879	5th of 6, East Division	Did not qualify
Tulsa Crude
2001–02	61	12	43	0	6	*	30	121	237	1185	7th of 7, West Division	Did not qualify

(*) = Depending on the year, league rules changed often in regards to use of Ties (T), Overtime Losses (OTL), and Shootout Losses (SOL). Not all categories were used each year.

-- = Penalty Minutes (PIM) were not a recorded league stat until the 1996–97 season.

=== Championships ===
Clark Cup: Awarded each year to the winner of the USHL's Tier I Junior Hockey playoff champions. Dubuque won this Cup three of its first five years as a franchise.

- 1980–81
- 1982–83
- 1984–85

Anderson Cup: Won by the team that accumulates the most points in the standings at the end of the regular season. Dubuque won the Anderson Cup in two of the franchise's first three seasons.

- 1980–81
- 1982–83

== Alumni ==
=== National Hockey League ===
- Chris Ferraro (1990–91, 1991–92)
  - Played for the New York Rangers, Pittsburgh Penguins, Edmonton Oilers, New York Islanders, and Washington Capitals
  - 4th round NHL draft choice by the New York Rangers
  - Represented the United States at the World Junior Hockey Championships in 1992 and 1993, and at the World Championships in 2003
- Peter Ferraro (1990–91, 1991–92)
  - Played for the New York Rangers, Pittsburgh Penguins, Boston Bruins, and Washington Capitals
  - 1st round NHL draft choice by the New York Rangers
- Mark Mowers (1993–94)
  - Played for the Nashville Predators, Detroit Red Wings, Boston Bruins, and Anaheim Ducks
  - Undrafted from the University of New Hampshire
- Gary Suter (1981–82, 1982–83)
  - NHL Rookie of the Year, 1985–86
  - Played for the Calgary Flames, Chicago Blackhawks, and the San Jose Sharks
  - 9th round NHL draft choice (out of 12 rounds) by the Calgary Flames
  - Two time Olympian for the United States including the silver medal in 2002.
  - Inducted into the U.S. Hockey Hall of Fame in 2011
- Landon Wilson (1992–93)
  - Played for the Colorado Avalanche, Boston Bruins, Phoenix Coyotes, Pittsburgh Penguins, and Dallas Stars
  - 1st round NHL draft choice by the Toronto Maple Leafs
- Andy Wozniewski (1998–99)
  - Played for Toronto Maple Leafs, St. Louis Blues, and Boston Bruins
  - Undrafted from the University of Wisconsin - Madison

=== European leagues ===
- Jimmy Andersson - Bofors IK (Sweden)
- Mike Fallon - 1980–81, 1982–83 Saints - Bofors IK (Sweden)
- Chris Guy - 1980–81 Saints - Nijmegen Tigers (Holland)
- Steven Janakas - 1980–81 Saints - Saterbagen Saints (Sweden)
- Jozef Lukac, - 1999–2000 Saints - BK Mladá Boleslav (Czech Republic)
- Micah Wouters - Nijmegen Tigers (Holland)

=== American Hockey League ===
- Akil Adams - Carolina Monarchs
- Michael Ayers - Manitoba Moose
- Sean Berens - Springfield Falcons
- Peter Cermak - Hershey Bears
- Kord Cernich - Capital District Islanders
- Matt Doman - Saint John Flames
- Luk Fulghum - Toronto Marlies
- Jason Guerriero - Milwaukee Admirals
- Jim Mullin - Worcester IceCats
- Nick Naumenko - Grand Rapids Griffins
- Greg Poss - Maine Mariners
- Ken Scuderi - Portland Pirates
- Jeff State - Hershey Bears
- David Vallieres - Kentucky Thoroughblades
- Kory Wright - 1982–83 Saints -Moncton Hawks

=== ECHL ===
- Nick Anderson - Las Vegas Wranglers
- Todd Barclay - Pensacola Ice Pilots
- Josh Blackburn - Columbia Inferno
- Todd Cary - Richmond Renegades
- Chris Cerrella - Baton Rouge Kingfish
- Bernie Chimel - Wheeling Nailers
- Trent Clark - San Diego Gulls
- Jon Foster - Wheeling Nailers
- Jon Gaskins - Mississippi Sea Wolves
- Forrest Gore - Peoria Rivermen
- Zach Ham - South Carolina Stingrays
- Matt Herhal - Reading Royals
- Kurt Kabat - Hampton Roads Admirals
- Josh Kern - Peoria Rivermen
- Jack Kowal - Miami Matadors
- Jeff Kozakowski - Toledo Storm
- Phil Lewandowski - Long Beach Ice Dogs
- Kevin Magnuson - Roanoke Express
- Chris Masters - Trenton Titans
- Peter Masters - Dayton Bombers
- Matt McElwee - Toledo Storm
- Jeff Mikesch - Louisville RiverFrogs
- Sean Molina - Cincinnati Cyclones
- Pete Pierman - New Orleans Brass
- Andy Powers - South Carolina Stingrays
- Jasen Rintala - Greensboro Generals
- Tom Rouleau - Wheeling Nailers
- John Sadowski - Mobile Mysticks
- Seabrook Satterlund - Toledo Storm
- Trent Schachle - Dayton Bombers
- Joe Smaza - Wheeling Nailers
- Chris Thompson - Dayton Bombers
- Mitch Vig - Mobile Mysticks

=== International Hockey League ===
- Geoff Collard - Orlando Solar Bears
- Bryan Collins - 1980–81 Saints - Fort Wayne Komets
- Tim Breslin - Chicago Wolves
- Steve MacSwain - 1982–83 Saints - Salt Lake Golden Eagles
- Curt Voegeli - 1980–81 Saints - Peoria Prancers

=== Other leagues ===
- Jayme Adduono - Columbus Cottonmouths (Central Hockey League (CHL))
- Grady Ambrose - Lakeland Ice Warriors (Sunshine Hockey League)
- Anthony Blumer - Elmira Jackals (United Hockey League (UHL))
- Brandon Carlson - Anchorage Aces (West Coast Hockey League (WCHL))
- Jaroslav Cesky - Tulsa Oilers (CHL)
- Brendon Clark - Roanoke Valley Vipers (UHL)
- Christian Fletcher - San Angelo Saints (CHL)
- Maurice Hall - Memphis RiverKings (CHL)
- Rich Hansen - Amarillo Gorillas (CHL)
- Wynn Henricksen - Odessa Jackalopes (Western Professional Hockey League (WPHL))
- Brian Hill - Madison Monsters (UHL)
- Anders Johnson - Knoxville Speed (UHL)
- Adam Kragthorpe - Quad City Mallards (UHL)
- Brian LaVack - B.C. Icemen (UHL)
- John Lex - 1980–81 Saints - Erie Golden Blades (Atlantic Coast Hockey League)
- Skeeter Moore - 1981–1982 Saints - San Angelo Outlaws (CHL)
- Darren Semeniuk - Anchorage Aces (WCHL)
- Joe Statkus - Rockford IceHogs (UHL)
- Alex Todd - Lubbock Cotton Kings (CHL)
- Eric Tuott - Phoenix Mustangs (WCHL)
- Paul Williams - Anchorage Aces (WCHL)
