= List of USHL Champions =

The United States Hockey League began in 1961 as a semi-professional ice hockey league. Starting with the 1979–80 season, the league became a strictly Amateur league, and began awarding its champion the Clark Cup Trophy. All champions of the USHL are highlighted in this page.

== Clark Cup ==
The Clark Cup is the current trophy awarded annually to the winner of the United States Hockey League Tier 1 Junior Hockey playoff champions. The Clark Cup was named in honor of Don Clark, the long-time registrar of the Minnesota Amateur Hockey Association. Clark was also the recipient of the NHL's Lester Patrick Trophy for his contributions to hockey in the United States. The Clark Cup is one of two trophies that can be won by any team in a given year, with the other being the Anderson Cup which is awarded to the team with the most points in the standings at the end of the regular season.

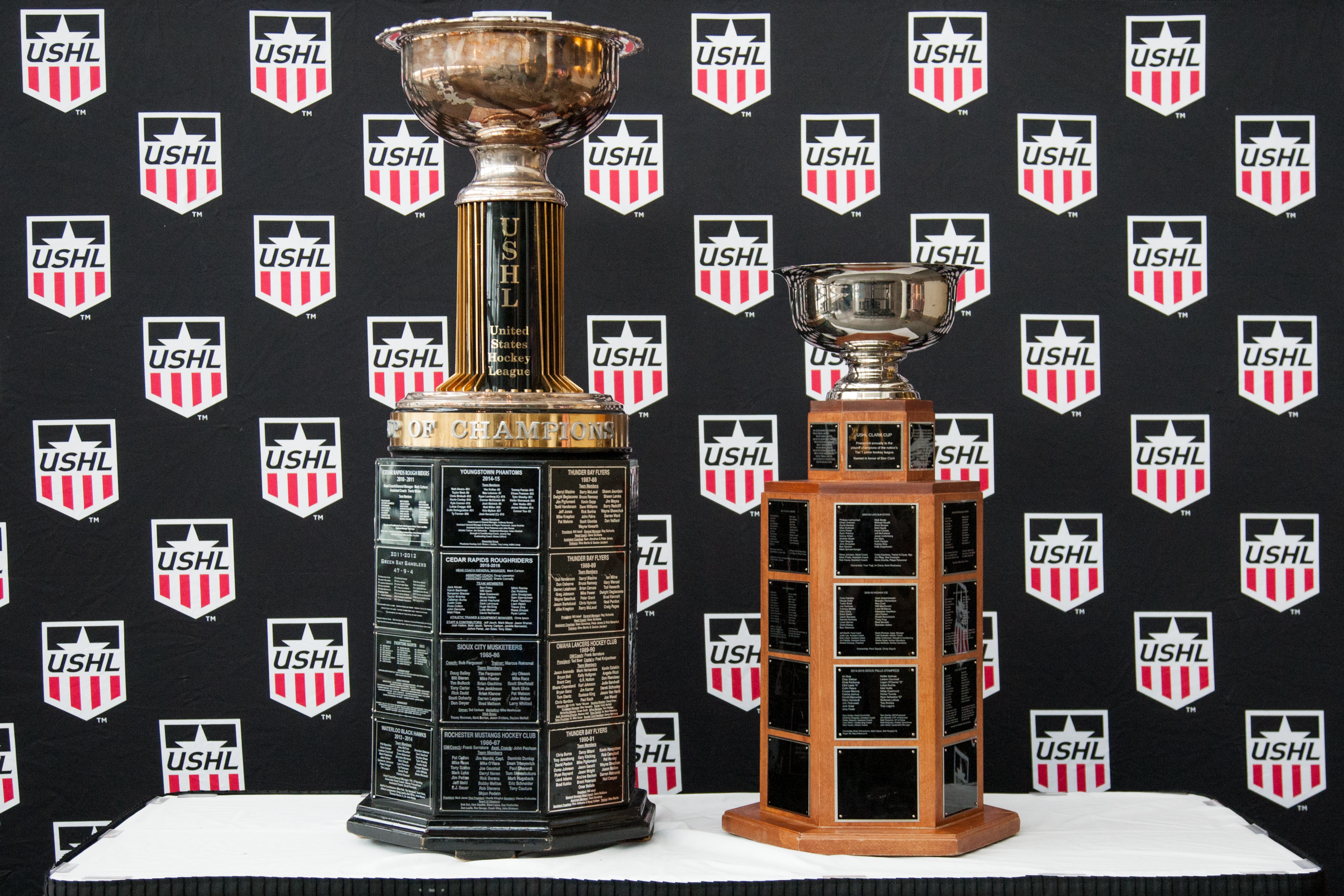
Side-by-side view of the Anderson Cup, left, and Clark Cup, right, presented to the regular season winner and postseason playoff winner, respectively.

== USHL Champions ==
=== Semi-Pro Era (1961–79) ===
Year	Team
1961–62	Rochester Mustangs
1962–63	Green Bay Bobcats
1963–64	Waterloo Black Hawks
1964–65	Waterloo Black Hawks
1965–66	Waterloo Black Hawks
1966–67	Waterloo Black Hawks
1967–68	Waterloo Black Hawks
1968–69	Marquette Iron Rangers
1969–70	Marquette Iron Rangers
1970–71	Marquette Iron Rangers
1971–72	Thunder Bay Twins
1972–73	Thunder Bay Twins
1973–74	Thunder Bay Twins
1974–75	Waterloo Black Hawks
1975–76	Milwaukee Admirals
1976–77	Grand Rapids Blades
1977–78	Waterloo Black Hawks
1978–79	Waterloo Black Hawks

=== Junior Era (1979–present) ===
List of champions:

Year	Team
1979–80	Hennepin Nordiques
1980–81	Dubuque Fighting Saints
1981–82	Sioux City Musketeers
1982–83	Dubuque Fighting Saints
1983–84	St. Paul Vulcans
1984–85	Dubuque Fighting Saints
1985–86	Sioux City Musketeers
1986–87	Rochester Mustangs
1987–88	Thunder Bay Flyers
1988–89	Thunder Bay Flyers
1989–90	Omaha Lancers
1990–91	Omaha Lancers
1991–92	Des Moines Buccaneers
1992–93	Omaha Lancers
1993–94	Omaha Lancers
1994–95	Des Moines Buccaneers
1995–96	Green Bay Gamblers
1996–97	Lincoln Stars
1997–98	Omaha Lancers
1998–99	Des Moines Buccaneers
1999–00	Green Bay Gamblers
2000–01	Omaha Lancers
2001–02	Sioux City Musketeers
2002–03	Lincoln Stars
2003–04	Waterloo Black Hawks
2004–05	Cedar Rapids RoughRiders
2005–06	Des Moines Buccaneers
2006–07	Sioux Falls Stampede
2007–08	Omaha Lancers
2008–09	Indiana Ice
2009–10	Green Bay Gamblers
2010–11	Dubuque Fighting Saints
2011–12	Green Bay Gamblers
2012–13	Dubuque Fighting Saints
2013–14	Indiana Ice
2014–15	Sioux Falls Stampede
2015–16	Tri-City Storm
2016–17	Chicago Steel
2017–18	Fargo Force
2018–19	Sioux Falls Stampede
2019–20	Not awarded
2020–21	Chicago Steel
2021–22	Sioux City Musketeers
2022–23	Youngstown Phantoms
2023–24	Fargo Force
2024–25	Muskegon Lumberjacks
2025–26	Sioux Falls Stampede

=== Championships by team ===
Team	Semipro titles	Junior titles	Total USHL titles	Championship years
Waterloo Black Hawks	8	1	9	1963–64, 1964–65, 1965–66, 1966–67, 1967–68, 1974–75, 1977–78, 1978–79, 2003–04
Omaha Lancers	0	7	7	1989–1990, 1990–91, 1992–93, 1993–94, 1997–98, 2000–01, 2007–08
Sioux City Musketeers	0	4	4	1981–82, 1985–86, 2001–02, 2021–22
Des Moines Buccaneers	0	4	4	1991–92, 1994–95, 1998–99, 2005–06
Green Bay Gamblers	0	4	4	1995–96, 1999–00, 2009–10, 2011–12
Marquette Iron Rangers	3	0	3	1968–69, 1969–70, 1970–71
Dubuque Fighting Saints (1980–2001)	0	3	3	1980–81, 1982–83, 1984–85
Sioux Falls Stampede	0	4	4	2006–07, 2014–15, 2018–19, 2025–26
Green Bay Bobcats	2	0	2	1962–63, 1971–72
Thunder Bay Twins	2	0	2	1972–73, 1973–74
Rochester Mustangs	1	1	2	1961–62, 1986–87
Dubuque Fighting Saints	0	2	2	2010–11, 2012–13
Thunder Bay Flyers	0	2	2	1987–88, 1988–89
Lincoln Stars	0	2	2	1996–97, 2002–03
Indiana Ice	0	2	2	2008–09, 2013–14
Chicago Steel	0	2	2	2016–17, 2020–21
Fargo Force	0	2	2	2017–18, 2023–24
Grand Rapids Blades	1	0	1	1976–77
Milwaukee Admirals	1	0	1	1975–76
Hennepin Nordiques	0	1	1	1979–80
St. Paul Vulcans	0	1	1	1983–84
Cedar Rapids RoughRiders	0	1	1	2004–05
Tri-City Storm	0	1	1	2015–16
Youngstown Phantoms	0	1	1	2022–23
Muskegon Lumberjacks	0	1	1	2024–25

- Teams marked in italics are no longer in the United States Hockey League

== Clark Cup MVPs ==
- 1998 – Nate Mauer, F, Omaha
- 1999 – Pete Fregoe, F, Des Moines
- 2000 – Aaron Smith, F, Green Bay
- 2001 – Ray Fraser, G, Omaha
- 2002 – Andy Franck, G, Sioux City
- 2003 – Danny Irmen, F, Lincoln
- 2004 – Kevin Regan, G, Waterloo
- 2005 – Alex Stalock, G, Cedar Rapids
- 2006 – Kyle Okposo, F, Des Moines
- 2007 – Matt Lundin, G, Sioux Falls
- 2008 – Drew Palmisano, G, Omaha
- 2010 – Anders Lee, F, Green Bay
- 2011 – Matt Morris, G, Dubuque
- 2012 – Sam Herr, F, Green Bay
- 2013 – Mike Szmatula, F, Dubuque
- 2014 – Jason Pawloski, G, Indiana
- 2015 – Troy Loggins, F, Sioux Falls
- 2016 – Wade Allison, F, Tri-City
- 2017 – Eduards Tralmaks, F, Chicago
- 2018 – Griffin Loughran, F, Fargo
- 2019 – Jaxson Stauber, G, Sioux Falls
- 2021 – Adam Fantilli, F, Chicago
- 2022 – Alex Tracy, G, Sioux City
- 2023 – Jacob Fowler, G, Youngstown
- 2024 – Mac Swanson, F, Fargo
- 2025 – Tynan Lawrence, F, Muskegon
- 2026 – Linards Feldbergs, G, Sioux Falls
