= St. Paul Vulcans =

American former junior ice hockey team

- City: St. Paul, Minnesota, United States
- League: United States Hockey League; Midwest Junior Hockey League; Can-Am Junior Hockey League; Thunder Bay-Minnesota Junior A Hockey League
- Operated: 1971–2000
- Colors: Red, yellow, black, white

Franchise history
- 1971–1972: Minnesota Jr. Stars
- 1972–1973: St. Paul Jr. Stars
- 1973–1995: St. Paul Vulcans
- 1995–2000: Twin Cities Vulcans
- 2000–present: Tri-City Storm

Championships
- Regular season titles: 1 Anderson Cups (1983–84)
- Playoff championships: 1 Clark Cups (1984)

The St. Paul Vulcans are a defunct Junior A ice hockey franchise that was based in Bloomington, Minnesota. The franchise was a charter member of the United States Hockey League (USHL) that started play with the 1979–80 season. The franchise was renamed the Twin Cities Vulcans for the start of the 1995 season. In 2000, the team was renamed the Tri-City Storm and moved to Kearney, Nebraska.

== History ==
The Vulcans franchise began as the Minnesota Jr. Stars of the Thunder Bay-Minnesota Junior A Hockey League in 1971. A year later, the league changed its name to the Can-Am Junior Hockey League. The team also changed their name to the St. Paul Jr. Stars. Their rival, the Thunder Bay Vulcans, sponsored by an organization in St. Paul, dropped their sponsorship of the franchise when they announced they would be playing exclusively in Canada the next season. At the start of the 1973 playoffs, the Vulcan organization began funding the Jr. Stars and their name was changed to the St. Paul Vulcans. Despite the name change, the Vulcans were league champions in 1973 and for their only time in team history, entered into the Canadian Centennial Cup playdowns. In the Eastern Centennial Cup Quarter-final, the Vulcans squared off against the Central Junior A Hockey League's Pembroke Lumber Kings. The Lumber Kings downed the Vulcans 4-games-to-1 to end their playoff run.

Due to disagreements between the American and Canadian teams in the CAJHL, the league was divided into the Thunder Bay Junior A Hockey League (again) and the Midwest Junior Hockey League. The Vulcans would be one of the stronger members of the MWJHL. In 1977, the MWJHL would merge into the United States Hockey League - introducing junior hockey to what would become America's top tier of junior hockey.

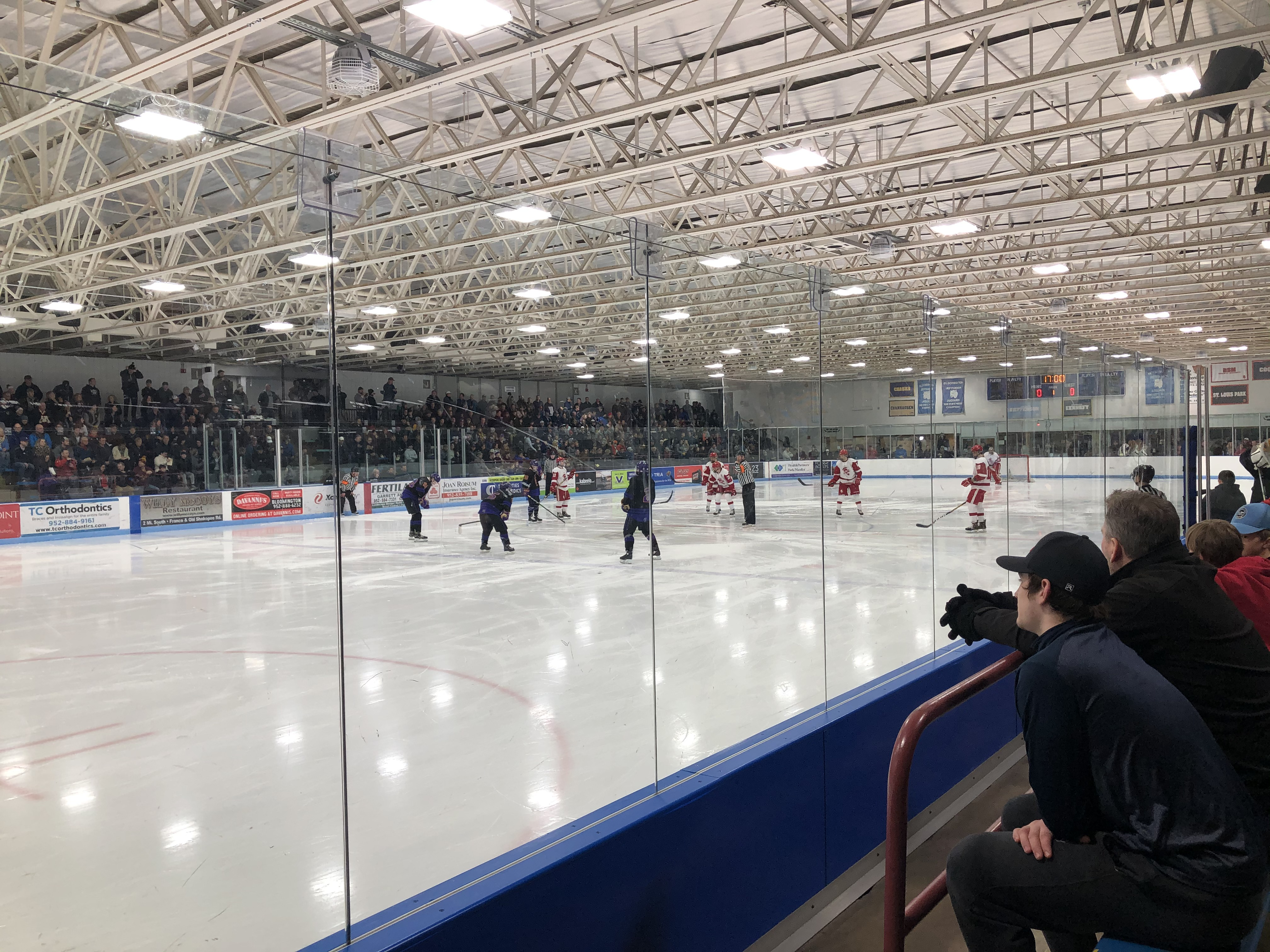
The Bloomington Ice Gardens was one of five home rinks used by the Vulcans in the Twin Cities from 1995 to 2000.

In 1995, the St. Paul Vulcans were renamed the Twin Cities Vulcans in hopes of broadening the fan base to cover the entire Minneapolis–Saint Paul area. Jim Johannson was named head coach and general manager of the Vulcans in June 1995. In July 1997, the Vulcans reduced their ticket prices to be the lowest in the USHL at US$5 per adult. Johannson stated that the team wanted to raise prices, but it would hurt the program which drew an average of 400 spectators per game, due to competition from other sporting events in the Twin Cities. In May 1998, Jim Hillman was promoted from assistant coach to replace Johannson who remained as the general manager.

In September 1999, the USHL approved the sale of the franchise to be moved to Kearney, Nebraska to become the Tri-City Storm after the season. Johannson stated that the Vulcans were victims of declining attendance and a southward geographical shift of the USHL to Iowa and Nebraska. During the final five years of existence of the Vulcans, they played their home games in Mariucci Arena at the University of Minnesota, Wakota Arena in South St. Paul, Augsburg University Arena in Minneapolis, Columbia Arena in Fridley, and then at the Bloomington Ice Gardens in the final season.

The Vulcans placed sixth during the 1999–2000 season. In the playoffs, they defeated the Sioux Falls Stampede by three consecutive one-goal victories in the first round, then defeated the Lincoln Stars by three games to two in the second round, then lost to Green Bay Gamblers by four games to one in the Clark Cup finals. The Vulcans qualified for the USA Hockey Junior A National Championship since Green Bay was the host team. The Vulcans defeated the Danville Wings by a 3–0 score in the semifinals, then defeated the Green Bay Gamblers by a 4–1 score in the finals to win the national championship.

== Season-by-season results ==
Season	GP	W	L	T	OTL	GF	GA	P	Results
1971-72	24	12	11	1	-	--	--	25	3rd TBMJHL
1972-73	32	27	3	2	-	170	79	56	1st CAJHL
1973-74	60	38	21	1	-	343	263	77	3rd MWJHL
1974-75	60	33	25	2	-	305	298	68	3rd MWJHL
1975-76	50	25	24	1	-	272	230	51	3rd MWJHL
1976-77	48	29	18	1	-	239	203	59	1st MWJHL
1977-78	51	16	35	0	-	209	287	32	3rd USHL-MW
1978-79	50	12	38	0	-	170	255	24	4th USHL-MW
1979-80	48	10	38	0	-	205	303	20	4th USHL-N
1980-81	48	28	19	1	-	291	223	57	3rd USHL-N
1981-82	48	26	21	1	-	263	251	53	4th USHL
1982-83	48	18	28	2	-	242	294	38	6th USHL
1983-84	48	37	8	0	3	246	160	77	1st USHL
1984-85	48	31	16	0	1	263	198	63	4th USHL
1985-86	48	33	13	0	2	258	178	69	2nd USHL
1986-87	48	21	22	4	1	236	228	47	8th USHL
1987-88	48	29	15	4	0	277	181	66	3rd USHL
1988-89	48	38	10	0	0	306	171	76	2nd USHL
1989-90	48	27	19	1	1	229	197	56	6th USHL
1990-91	48	28	16	3	1	228	182	60	4th USHL
1991-92	48	31	12	2	3	255	179	67	3rd USHL
1992-93	48	26	19	2	1	212	201	55	5th USHL
1993-94	52	20	28	0	4	175	183	44	7th USHL
1994-95	48	31	14	2	1	211	166	65	3rd USHL
1995-96	46	18	21	3	4	169	184	43	8th USHL
1996-97	54	25	26	3	0	190	211	53	4th USHL-N
1997-98	56	19	32	5	0	162	242	43	6th USHL-N
1998-99	56	22	34	0	0	183	246	44	4th USHL-C
1999-00	58	31	19	0	8	203	174	70	5th USHL-W

=== Playoffs ===
- 1972 Lost Final

Minnesota Jr. Stars defeated Westfort Hurricanes 2-games-to-none
Thunder Bay Vulcans defeated Minnesota Jr. Stars 4-games-to-none

- 1973 Won League, Won TBAHA Jack Adams Trophy final, Lost Dudley Hewitt Cup quarter-final

St. Paul Jr. Stars defeated Minneapolis Bruins by default (Bruins forfeit late in Game 1)
St. Paul Jr. Stars defeated Thunder Bay Centennials 4-games-to-none CAJHL CHAMPIONS, JACK ADAMS TROPHY CHAMPIONS
Pembroke Lumber Kings (CJHL) defeated St. Paul Vulcans 4-games-to-1
