= Ryan Potulny =

American ice hockey player and coach

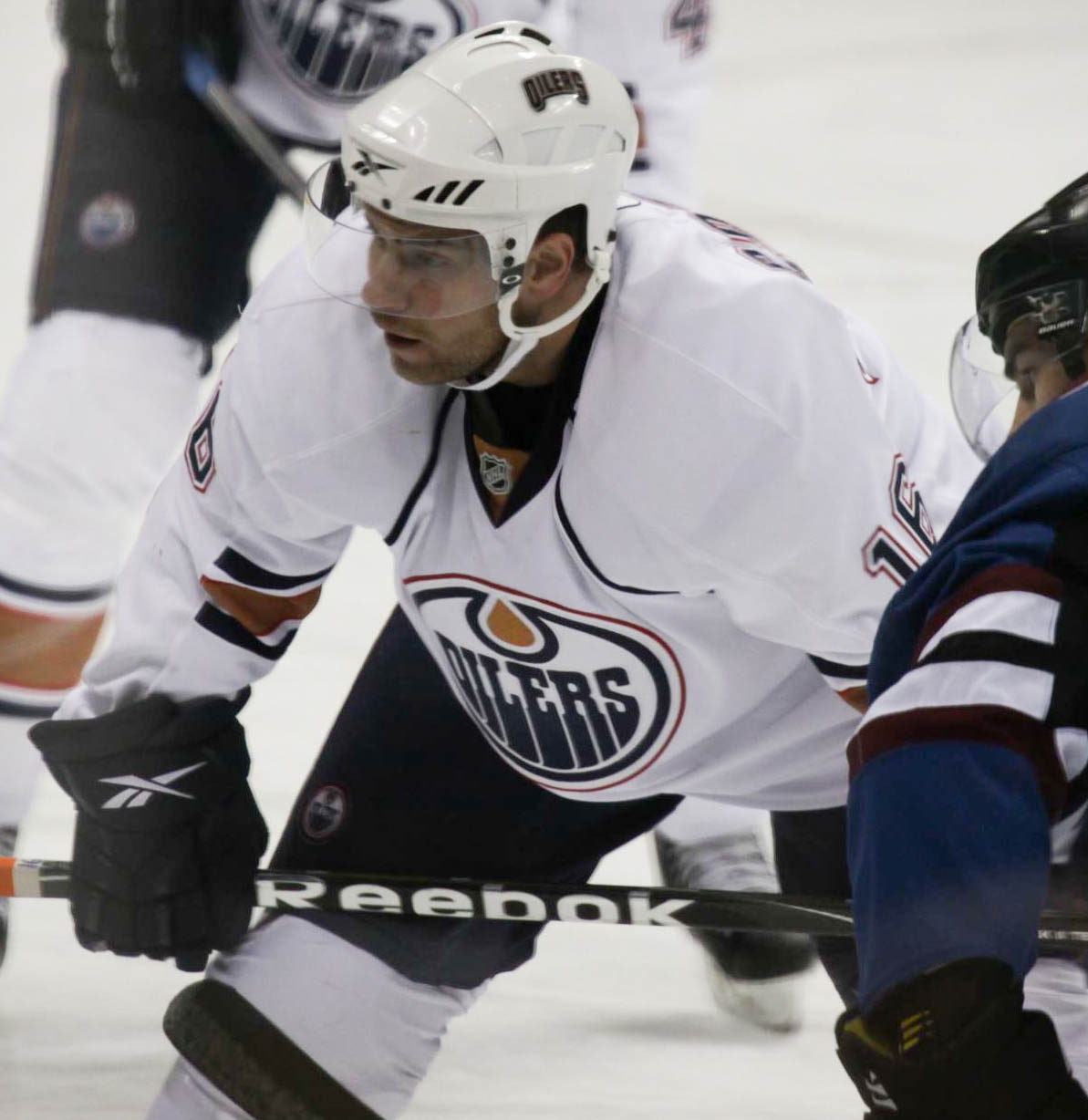
- Potulny with the Edmonton Oilers in 2010
- Born: September 5, 1984 (age 41) Grand Forks, North Dakota, U.S.
- Height: 6 ft 0 in (183 cm)
- Weight: 190 lb (86 kg; 13 st 8 lb)
- Position: Center
- Shot: Left
- Played for: Philadelphia Flyers; Edmonton Oilers; Chicago Blackhawks; Ottawa Senators; Lahti Pelicans; Mountfield HK; EHC Black Wings Linz; Braehead Clan
- National team: United States
- NHL draft: 87th overall, 2003; Philadelphia Flyers
- Playing career: 2006–2018

Ryan Potulny (born September 5, 1984) is an American former professional ice hockey center. He is currently an assistant coach for the University of Minnesota men's ice hockey team.

== Playing career ==
Potulny was drafted in the third round, 87th overall, at the 2003 NHL entry draft by the Philadelphia Flyers after playing two years with the USHL's Lincoln Stars. He spent the next three seasons playing collegiate hockey with the Minnesota Golden Gophers, recording 68 goals and 50 assists for a total of 118 points in 100 games. Potulny ranked first in the nation with 38 goals and 63 points during his last season with the Gophers, 2005–06, and was named an All-WCHA First Team Honoree and was a finalist for the Hobey Baker Memorial Award.

Potulny signed a 2-year entry-level contract with the Flyers on March 29, 2006. He played his first two professional games with the Flyers at the tail-end of the 2005–06 season, making his NHL debut on April 7, 2006 and also recording his first point. He split the 2006–07 season with the Flyers and the AHL's Philadelphia Phantoms.

On April 24, 2008, Potulny scored the game-winning goal at 2:58 in the fifth overtime in Game 5 of the East Division Semifinals. The game's total time was 142:58, at that time an AHL record for longest game.

Potulny was traded from the Flyers to the Edmonton Oilers on June 6, 2008 in exchange for Danny Syvret. He then signed a one-year deal with the Oilers on June 14, 2008.

On September 8, 2010, Potulny signed a one-year two-way contract as a free agent with the Chicago Blackhawks. He ultimately played in only three games with the Blackhawks, spending much of the season with their AHL affiliate in Rockford.

On February 28, 2011, Potulny was traded to the Ottawa Senators along with a second round draft pick in the 2011 entry draft in return for a conditional seventh-round pick in the 2012 entry draft and Chris Campoli.

On July 1, 2011, Potulny signed a two-year two-way contract worth $525,000 per year with the second year on a one-way basis, with the Washington Capitals. He was assigned to AHL affiliate, the Hershey Bears for the duration of his contract with the Capitals.

Upon completion of his contract with the Capitals, Potulny signed in Russia as a free agent on a one-year deal with Avangard Omsk of the Kontinental Hockey League on May 30, 2013. Potulny sought a release from his contract with Omsk just three months later, having never featured in the KHL, before belatedly returning to the Bears for the remainder of the season on December 22, 2013.

After three seasons with the Hershey Bears, Potulny signed a one-year AHL contract with the Hartford Wolf Pack, an affiliate of the New York Rangers on August 6, 2014.

On June 11, 2015, Potulny left North America to sign a one-year contract with Finnish club, Lahti Pelicans of the top-tier Liiga.

On 28 August 2017, Potulny agreed a deal with the Braehead Clan of the United Kingdom's Elite Ice Hockey League. Potulny retired at the conclusion of the season to take up an assistant coach role at the University of Minnesota.

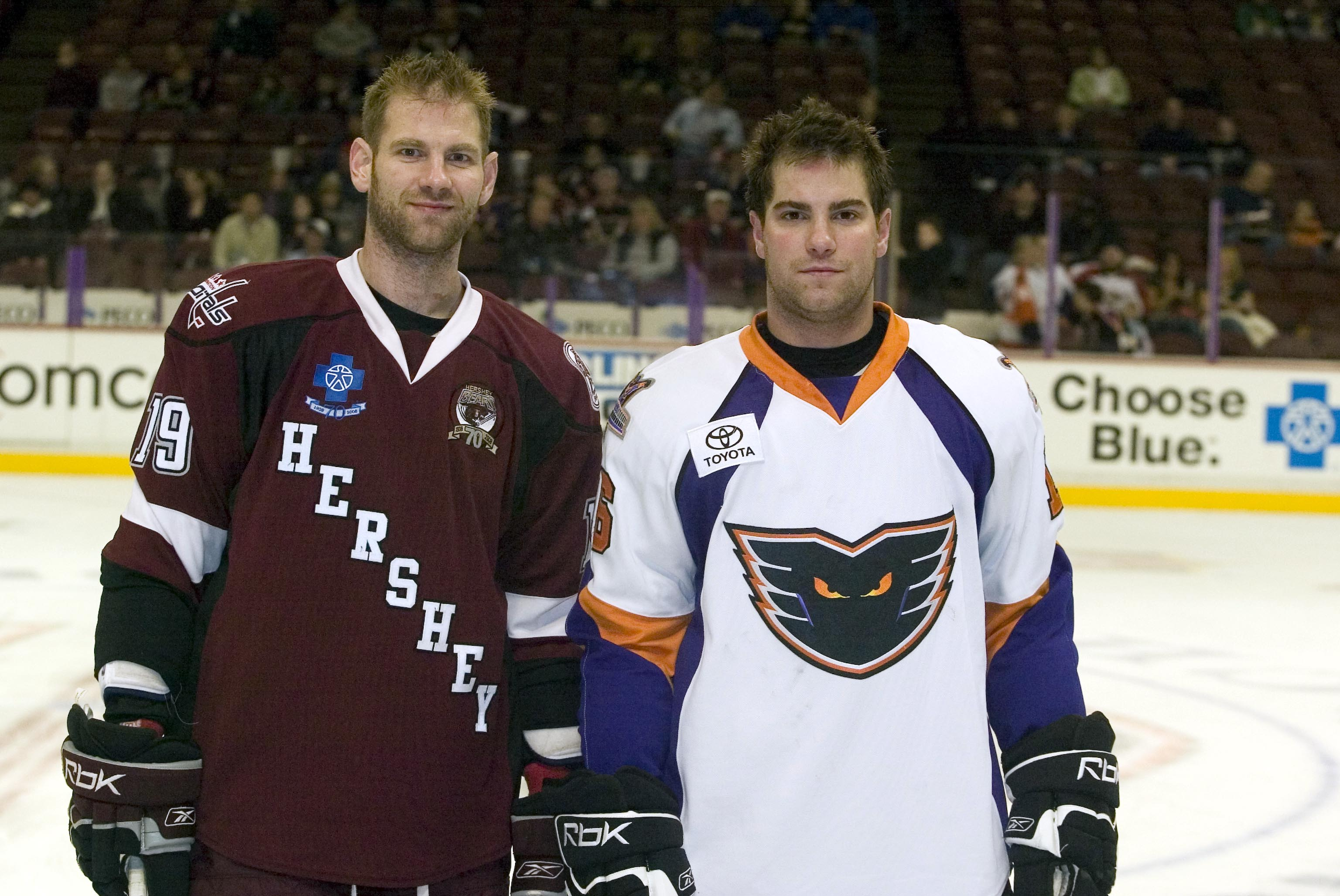
Ryan (right) with his brother Grant in 2007

== Family ==
He is the younger brother of Grant Potulny, an Ottawa Senators draft pick in 2000 and a former assistant coach with the Minnesota Golden Gophers men's ice hockey team from 2014 to 2017. Grant is currently the head coach of the Hartford Wolf Pack of the American Hockey League (AHL).

== Career statistics ==
=== Regular season and playoffs ===
			Regular season					Playoffs
Season	Team	League	GP	G	A	Pts	PIM	GP	G	A	Pts	PIM
2000–01	Red River High School	USHS	—	—	—	—	—	—	—	—	—	—
2001–02	Lincoln Stars	USHL	60	23	34	57	65	4	1	0	1	2
2002–03	Lincoln Stars	USHL	54	35	43	78	18	10	6	11	17	8
2003–04	Minnesota Golden Gophers	WCHA	15	6	8	14	10	—	—	—	—	—
2004–05	Minnesota Golden Gophers	WCHA	44	24	17	41	20	—	—	—	—	—
2005–06	Minnesota Golden Gophers	WCHA	41	38	25	63	31	—	—	—	—	—
2005–06	Philadelphia Flyers	NHL	2	0	1	1	0	—	—	—	—	—
2006–07	Philadelphia Phantoms	AHL	30	12	14	26	34	—	—	—	—	—
2006–07	Philadelphia Flyers	NHL	35	7	5	12	22	—	—	—	—	—
2007–08	Philadelphia Phantoms	AHL	58	21	26	47	51	12	3	5	8	10
2007–08	Philadelphia Flyers	NHL	7	0	1	1	4	—	—	—	—	—
2008–09	Springfield Falcons	AHL	70	38	24	62	62	—	—	—	—	—
2008–09	Edmonton Oilers	NHL	8	0	3	3	2	—	—	—	—	—
2009–10	Springfield Falcons	AHL	14	3	5	8	8	—	—	—	—	—
2009–10	Edmonton Oilers	NHL	64	15	17	32	28	—	—	—	—	—
2010–11	Rockford IceHogs	AHL	58	18	23	41	30	—	—	—	—	—
2010–11	Chicago Blackhawks	NHL	3	0	0	0	0	—	—	—	—	—
2010–11	Ottawa Senators	NHL	7	0	0	0	0	—	—	—	—	—
2010–11	Binghamton Senators	AHL	13	3	5	8	4	23	14	12	26	12
2011–12	Hershey Bears	AHL	61	33	32	65	32	5	2	2	4	0
2012–13	Hershey Bears	AHL	66	19	22	41	30	5	0	2	2	2
2013–14	Hershey Bears	AHL	38	3	7	10	10	—	—	—	—	—
2014–15	Hartford Wolf Pack	AHL	25	2	3	5	10	7	0	0	0	0
2015–16	Pelicans	Liiga	60	13	23	36	30	9	2	2	4	4
2016–17	Mountfield HK	ELH	18	3	5	8	8	—	—	—	—	—
2016–17	EHC Black Wings Linz	EBEL	35	12	17	29	14	5	1	0	1	0
2017–18	Braehead Clan	EIHL	37	7	18	25	14	—	—	—	—	—
NHL totals			126	22	27	49	54	—	—	—	—	—
AHL totals			433	152	161	313	257	52	19	21	40	24

=== International ===
Year	Team	Event	Result	GP	G	A	Pts	PIM
2010	United States	WC	13th	6	2	2	4	0
Senior totals				6	2	2	4	0

== Awards and honors ==
Award	Year
USHL Dave Tyler Junior Player of the Year Award	2002–03
All-WCHA Third Team	2004–05
All-WCHA First Team	2005–06
AHCA West First-Team All-American	2005–06
WCHA All-Tournament Team	2006
AHL All-Star Classic	2008–09'

Awards and achievements
Preceded by Marty Sertich	NCAA Ice Hockey Scoring Champion; 2005–06	Succeeded by T. J. Hensick
