= Steve Wagner (ice hockey) =

American ice hockey player (born 1984)

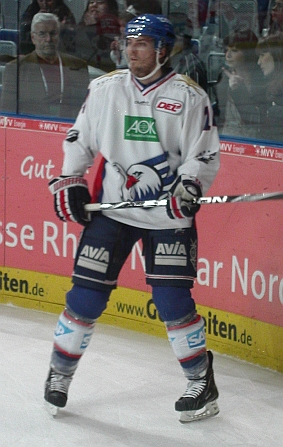
- Wagner with the Adler Mannheim in 2012
- Born: March 6, 1984 (age 42) Grand Rapids, Minnesota, U.S.
- Height: 6 ft 2 in (188 cm)
- Weight: 200 lb (91 kg; 14 st 4 lb)
- Position: Defense
- Shot: Left
- Played for: St. Louis Blues; Adler Mannheim
- NHL draft: Undrafted
- Playing career: 2007–2016

Steven Lee Wagner (born March 6, 1984) is an American former professional ice hockey defenseman. He most notably played with the St. Louis Blues in the National Hockey League (NHL) before playing abroad for Adler Mannheim of the Deutsche Eishockey Liga (DEL).

== Playing career ==
After two years in the USHL with the Des Moines Buccaneers and Tri-City Storm Wagner went to Minnesota State University, Mankato. He played three seasons with the Mavericks, having his most successful year during the 2006–07 season when he scored 29 points in 38 games. That year he was signed by the St. Louis Blues and also appeared in 14 games with the Blues minor league affiliate Peoria Rivermen, scoring 3 points.

For the 2007–08 season Wagner's solid play during training camp earned him an opening day spot on the Blues roster. He played his first NHL game in the season opener on October 4, 2007, against the Phoenix Coyotes in Phoenix where he played 22 shifts for 16:22 of ice time. In his second game he earned his first career assist, and on October 20, 2007, he scored his first career goal against his home state team, the Minnesota Wild.

On February 11, 2010, Wagner was traded by the Blues to the Pittsburgh Penguins in exchange for Nate Guenin.

On June 14, 2010, as an unrestricted free agent, Wagner re-signed to a one-year two-way contract with the Penguins. He was again reassigned as expected to spend the duration of the 2010–11 season playing for the Penguins AHL affiliate in Wilkes-Barre/Scranton. In the 2011 Calder Cup playoffs, Wagner became the first Wilkes-Barre/Scranton player to record a hat trick, scoring three goals in the first period against the Norfolk Admirals in a series clinching victory.

On June 9, 2011, Wagner signed a one-year deal with European DEL team, Adler Mannheim.

== Career statistics ==
			Regular season					Playoffs
Season	Team	League	GP	G	A	Pts	PIM	GP	G	A	Pts	PIM
2002–03	Des Moines Buccaneers	USHL	14	0	1	1	17	—	—	—	—	—
2002–03	Tri-City Storm	USHL	27	0	5	5	52	3	1	0	1	0
2003–04	Tri-City Storm	USHL	43	3	19	22	52	9	0	4	4	13
2004–05	Minnesota State University	WCHA	37	1	9	10	40	—	—	—	—	—
2005–06	Minnesota State University	WCHA	38	5	11	16	53	—	—	—	—	—
2006–07	Minnesota State University	WCHA	38	6	23	29	63	—	—	—	—	—
2006–07	Peoria Rivermen	AHL	14	1	2	3	8	—	—	—	—	—
2007–08	St. Louis Blues	NHL	24	2	6	8	8	—	—	—	—	—
2007–08	Peoria Rivermen	AHL	23	5	7	12	16	—	—	—	—	—
2008–09	St. Louis Blues	NHL	22	2	2	4	18	—	—	—	—	—
2008–09	Peoria Rivermen	AHL	47	6	16	22	38	7	1	3	4	4
2009–10	Peoria Rivermen	AHL	46	3	12	15	20	—	—	—	—	—
2009–10	Wilkes-Barre/Scranton Penguins	AHL	20	1	6	7	10	4	0	1	1	2
2010–11	Wilkes-Barre/Scranton Penguins	AHL	69	5	23	28	43	12	3	1	4	2
2011–12	Adler Mannheim	DEL	45	2	15	17	32	14	0	3	3	2
2012–13	Adler Mannheim	DEL	48	5	15	20	34	6	0	0	0	2
2013–14	Adler Mannheim	DEL	40	6	11	17	12	5	0	1	1	2
2014–15	Adler Mannheim	DEL	52	3	8	11	22	14	0	1	1	10
2015–16	Adler Mannheim	DEL	45	3	9	12	26	3	0	1	1	0
NHL totals			46	4	8	12	26	—	—	—	—	—

== Awards and honors ==
Award	Year
All-WCHA Third Team	2006–07
