= Matt Fornataro =

Canadian ice hockey player (born 1985)

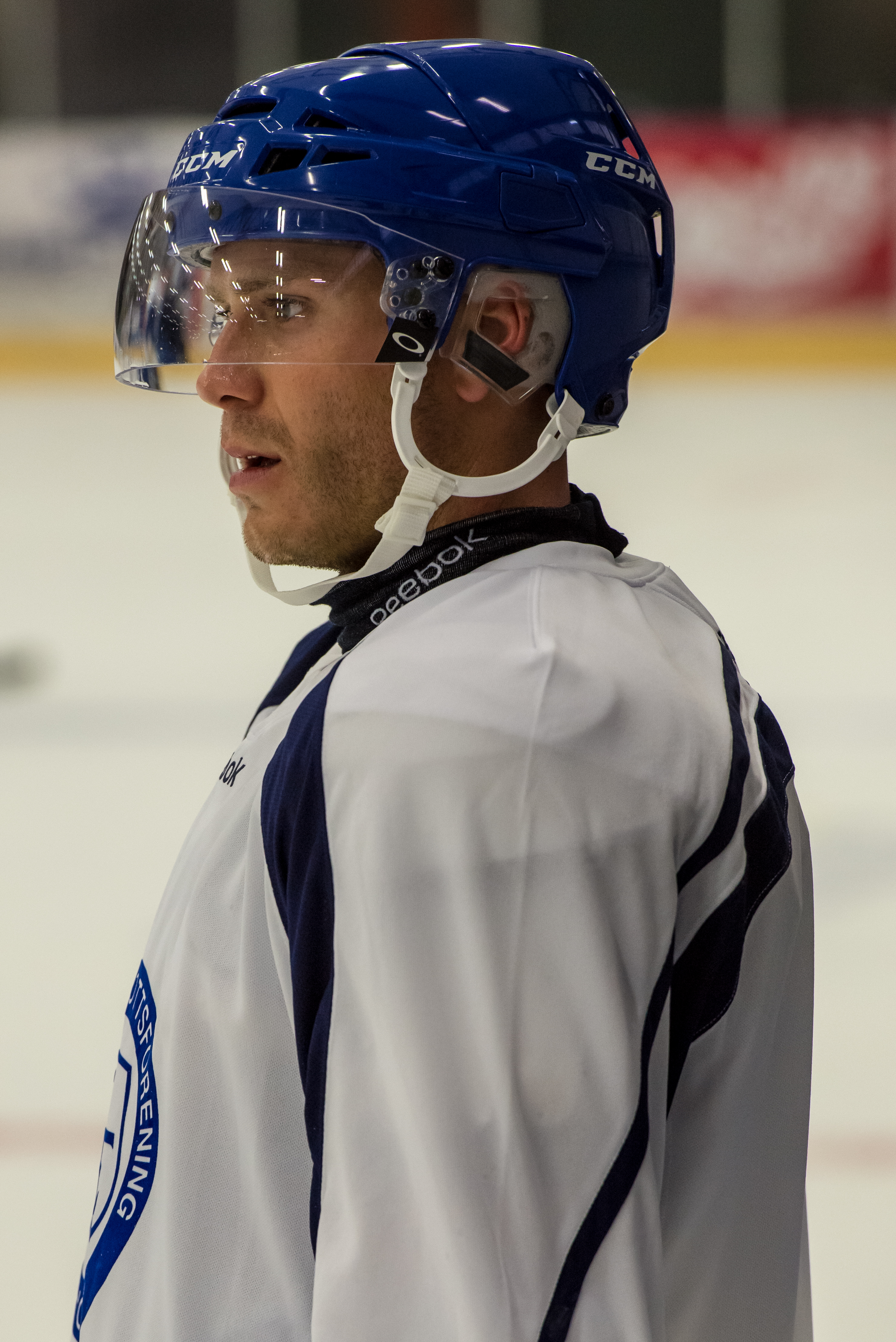
- Born: June 26, 1985 (age 40) Calgary, Alberta, Canada
- Height: 6 ft 0 in (183 cm)
- Weight: 190 lb (86 kg; 13 st 8 lb)
- Position: Forward
- Shot: Right
- Played for: Syracuse Crunch; Worcester Sharks; Houston Aeros; Norfolk Admirals; Rockford Icehogs; Leksands IF; Graz 99ers
- NHL draft: Undrafted
- Playing career: 2008–2016

Matt Fornataro (born June 26, 1985, in Calgary, Canada) is a Canadian former professional ice hockey forward.

== Playing career ==
Undrafted, Fornataro made his professional debut with the Syracuse Crunch of the American Hockey League at the conclusion of the 2007–08 season.

On February 21, 2012, Fornataro was included in an NHL transaction, when he was dealt from the Norfolk Admirals, an affiliate of the Tampa Bay Lightning to the Rockford IceHogs in exchange for Brandon Segal.

On June 25, 2013, after his first season abroad in Sweden with VIK Västerås HK of the HockeyAllsvenskan it was announced that Fornataro would be joining Leksands IF for the 2013–14 SHL season. Fornataro struggled to establish himself within the SHL with Leksands and after 29 games he returned to VIK Västerås HK for the remainder of the season.

After splitting the 2014–15 season between Västerås and Mora IK, Fornataro left the second division and signed a one-year contract with Austrian club, Graz 99ers of the EBEL on August 30, 2015.

== Career statistics ==
			Regular season					Playoffs
Season	Team	League	GP	G	A	Pts	PIM	GP	G	A	Pts	PIM
2002–03	Waterloo Blackhawks	USHL	54	15	20	35	74	7	2	2	4	8
2003–04	Waterloo Blackhawks	USHL	60	16	28	44	79	10	3	5	8	12
2004–05	U. of New Hampshire	HE	41	8	12	20	42	—	—	—	—	—
2005–06	U. of New Hampshire	HE	38	5	7	12	18	—	—	—	—	—
2006–07	U. of New Hampshire	HE	39	13	27	40	34	—	—	—	—	—
2007–08	U. of New Hampshire	HE	38	18	28	46	44	—	—	—	—	—
2007–08	Syracuse Crunch	AHL	1	1	0	1	0	—	—	—	—	—
2008–09	Worcester Sharks	AHL	51	10	15	25	30	1	0	1	1	0
2008–09	Phoenix RoadRunners	ECHL	21	9	9	18	54	—	—	—	—	—
2009–10	Houston Aeros	AHL	1	0	0	0	0	—	—	—	—	—
2009–10	South Carolina Stingrays	ECHL	33	18	18	36	25	—	—	—	—	—
2009–10	Norfolk Admirals	AHL	45	11	7	18	22	—	—	—	—	—
2010–11	Norfolk Admirals	AHL	70	17	25	42	35	6	0	4	4	0
2011–12	Norfolk Admirals	AHL	46	5	20	25	22	—	—	—	—	—
2011–12	Rockford IceHogs	AHL	23	3	6	9	8	—	—	—	—	—
2012–13	VIK Västerås HK	Allsv	48	16	32	48	40	10	4	2	6	22
2013–14	Leksands IF	SHL	29	2	4	6	26	—	—	—	—	—
2013–14	VIK Västerås HK	Allsv	21	4	8	12	24	10	2	2	4	6
2014–15	VIK Västerås HK	Allsv	12	1	1	2	18	—	—	—	—	—
2014–15	Mora IK	Allsv	35	8	14	22	62	5	3	3	6	2
2015–16	Graz 99ers	EBEL	43	10	16	26	24	—	—	—	—	—
2015–16	Manchester Monarchs	ECHL	24	9	9	18	14	5	1	3	4	4
AHL totals			237	47	73	120	117	7	0	5	5	0

== Awards and honours ==
Award	Year
All-Hockey East Second Team	2007–08
AHCA East Second-Team All-American	2007–08
