= Jean-Philippe Lamoureux =

American ice hockey player (born 1984)

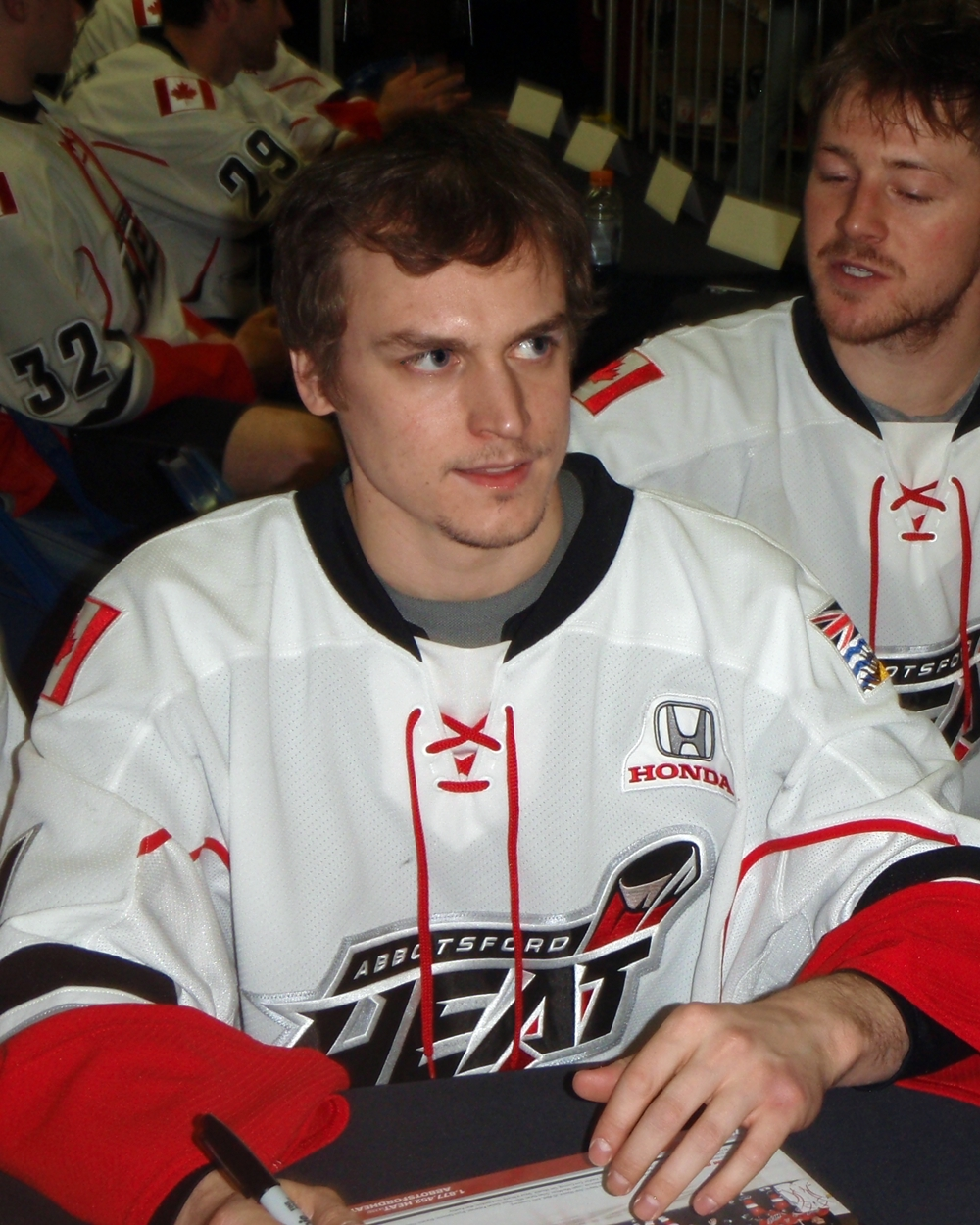
- Lamoureux with the Abbotsford Heat in 2011
- Born: August 10, 1984 (age 41) Grand Forks, North Dakota, U.S.
- Height: 5 ft 10 in (178 cm)
- Weight: 170 lb (77 kg; 12 st 2 lb)
- Position: Goaltender
- Caught: Left
- Played for: Portland Pirates; Abbotsford Heat; HDD Olimpija Ljubljana; EC VSV; Vienna Capitals; EC Red Bull Salzburg
- NHL draft: Undrafted
- Playing career: 2009–2025

Jean-Philippe Lamoureux (born August 10, 1984) is an American former professional ice hockey goaltender who is currently the Director of Player Personnel & Office Operations for the North Dakota Fighting Hawks men's ice hockey team.

== Playing career ==
=== Amateur ===
Lamoureux started his career playing three seasons with the Lincoln Stars, in the United States Hockey League, a junior ice hockey league.

He then played four years of college hockey at the University of North Dakota (2004–08), including a senior season that saw him earn a Hobey Baker Award nomination while leading the Fighting Sioux to the NCAA Frozen Four. Lamoureux is second all-time in school history with a 2.14 GAA, .920 save percentage and ten shutouts.

=== Professional ===
Lamoureux spent one season with the Alaska Aces of the ECHL, where he was named the league's goaltender of the year. He also set an ECHL record with eight shutouts. That year, the Aces advanced to the Kelly Cup Championship where they were later defeated in 7 games by the South Carolina Stingrays.

On July 30, 2009, Lamoureux was signed by the Buffalo Sabres to a one-year contract for the 2009–10 season. He was assigned to the Sabres AHL affiliate, the Portland Pirates, for the duration of the season and in 31 games posted 14 wins. Immediately preceding the Pirates' elimination from the Calder Cup playoffs, Lamoureux was recalled to the Sabres reserve squad for the Stanley Cup playoffs that year. He was not re-signed by the Sabres organization and went on to sign with the Calgary Flames AHL affiliate, the Abbotsford Heat, on July 22, 2010.

On May 12, 2012, after his debut season abroad in the EBEL with Slovenian team, HDD Olimpija Ljubljana, Lamoureux joined Austrian competitor club, EC VSV. After four seasons with EC VSV, Lamoureux spent three seasons with the Vienna Capitals and three seasons with EC Salzburg before returning to EC VSV for a further three seasons, retiring from hockey at the conclusion of the 2025 ICEHL season.

== Coaching and administrative career ==
Lamoureux has worked as a goaltending coach for his company, JPL Goaltending, and coached with Austria's U-18 team prior to his retirement from playing. On June 26, 2025, Lamoureux was announced as the Director of Player Personnel & Office Operations for his alma mater, North Dakota.

== Family ==
The Lamoureux family has six siblings who all play ice hockey at an elite level. Jean-Philippe, born 1984, is the oldest child in the family. His younger brother, Jacques, born 1986, previously played professional hockey in the ECHL with the Alaska Aces. His next brother, Pierre-Paul, born 1987, played three years of defence in the Western Hockey League with the Red Deer Rebels. The next brother, Mario, born 1988, was an NCAA forward and captain at the University of North Dakota and then played professionally in the ECHL, AHL and in Europe. His twin sisters Jocelyne and Monique won gold medals with Team USA at the 2018 Winter Olympics.

== Career statistics ==
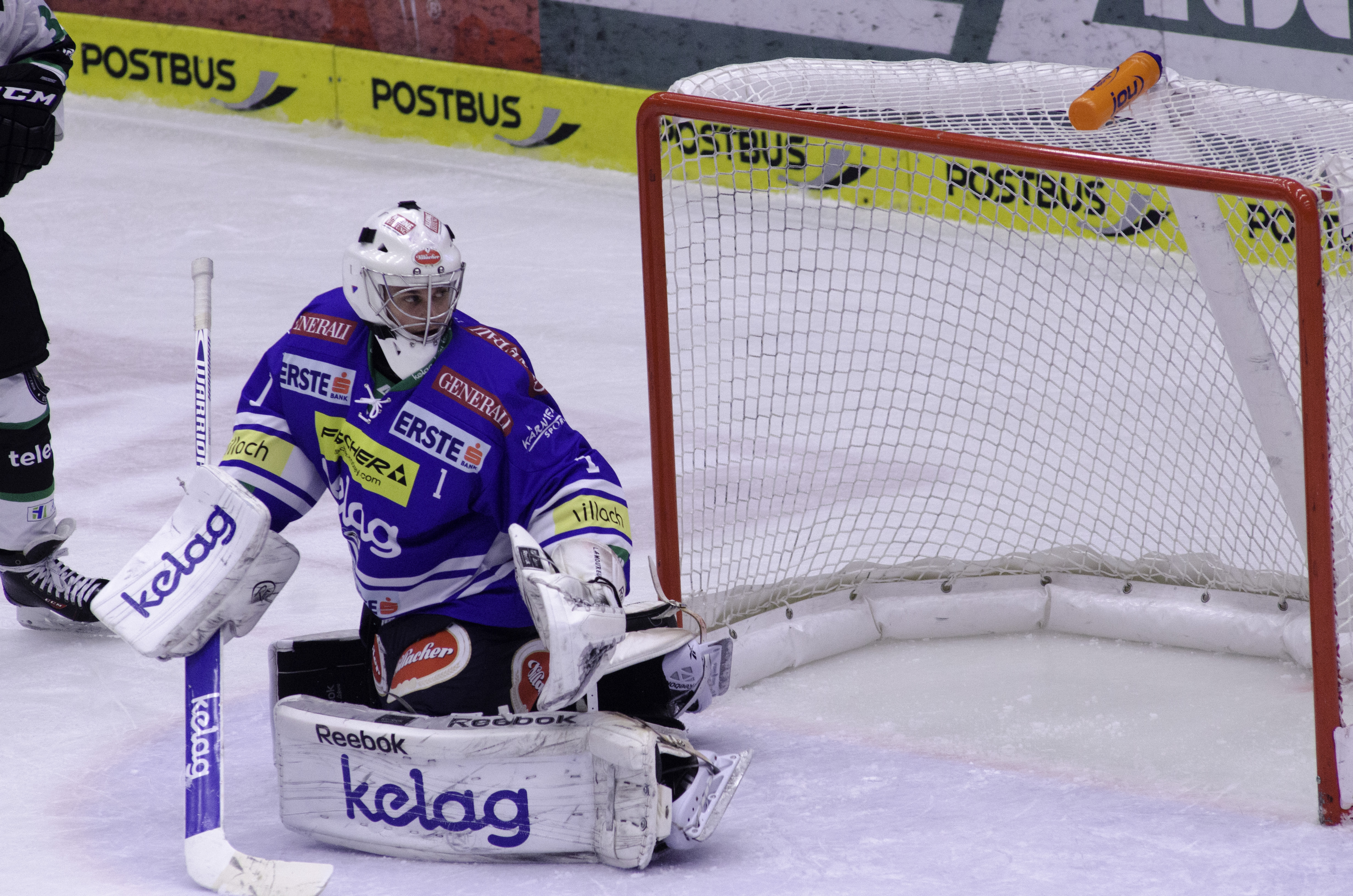
Lamoureux with EC VSV.

			Regular season									Playoffs
Season	Team	League	GP	W	L	T/OT	MIN	GA	SO	GAA	SV%	GP	W	L	MIN	GA	SO	GAA	SV%
2001–02	Lincoln Stars	USHL	31	20	8	1	1758	66	6	2.25	.917	2	—	—	—	—	—	—	—
2002–03	Lincoln Stars	USHL	31	22	8	1	1968	71	4	2.16	.917	4	—	—	—	—	—	—	—
2003–04	Lincoln Stars	USHL	50	22	23	3	2874	134	3	2.80	.918	—	—	—	—	—	—	—	—
2004–05	University of North Dakota	WCHA	18	7	8	2	1043	38	0	2.19	.914	—	—	—	—	—	—	—	—
2005–06	University of North Dakota	WCHA	14	5	7	0	734	32	1	2.61	.911	—	—	—	—	—	—	—	—
2006–07	University of North Dakota	WCHA	37	21	12	4	2184	88	3	2.42	.913	—	—	—	—	—	—	—	—
2007–08	University of North Dakota	WCHA	42	27	11	4	2508	73	6	1.75	.932	—	—	—	—	—	—	—	—
2008–09	Alaska Aces	ECHL	51	33	16	2	3707	117	8	2.29	.923	21	15	6	1263	41	4	1.95	.934
2009–10	Portland Pirates	AHL	31	14	12	2	1750	87	2	2.98	.894	4	0	3	207	10	0	2.90	.900
2010–11	Utah Grizzlies	ECHL	20	11	7	1	1157	48	3	2.49	.919	8	3	5	503	19	1	2.27	.925
2010–11	Abbotsford Heat	AHL	19	8	4	3	953	35	2	2.20	.915	—	—	—	—	—	—	—	—
2011–12	HDD Olimpija Ljubljana	EBEL	45	24	20	0	2628	129	0	2.92	.922	5	2	2	—	—	—	3.53	.909
2012–13	EC VSV	EBEL	43	24	18	0	—	—	—	2.82	.926	7	3	4	—	—	—	2.74	.922
2013–14	EC VSV	EBEL	46	27	17	0	—	—	—	2.70	.920	9	5	4	—	—	—	2.67	.920
2014–15	EC VSV	EBEL	46	24	21	0	2759	111	2	2.41	.932	5	2	3	—	—	—	2.72	.925
2015–16	EC VSV	EBEL	50	28	22	0	3032	113	0	2.24	.928	11	6	5	701	20	0	1.71	.945
2016–17	Vienna Capitals	EBEL	40	28	11	0	2374	88	0	2.22	.924	11	9	0	679	23	0	2.03	.916
2017–18	Vienna Capitals	EBEL	41	29	11	0	2379	83	0	2.09	.932	11	5	6	655	27	0	2.47	.899
2018–19	Vienna Capitals	EBEL	42	29	13	0	2474	104	0	2.52	.913	18	10	8	1136	38	0	2.01	.932
2019–20	EC Salzburg	EBEL	34	27	7	0	2059	60	0	1.75	.946	3	2	1	—	—	1	1.34	.950
2020–21	EC Salzburg	ICEHL	36	22	14	0	2110	83	0	2.36	.920	9	4	4	—	—	2	2.79	.898
2021–22	EC Salzburg	ICEHL	17	12	5	0	1023	35	0	2.05	.927	4	4	0	—	—	1	1.50	.942
2022–23	EC VSV	ICEHL	41	28	13	0	2467	111	0	2.70	.914	3	1	2	—	—	1	2.36	.930
2023–24	EC VSV	ICEHL	43	23	19	0	2562	118	0	2.76	.915	5	1	4	—	—	0	3.28	.899
2024–25	EC VSV	ICEHL	30	17	13	0	1716	82	0	2.87	.911	3	1	2	177	8	0	2.72	.918
AHL totals			50	22	16	5	2703	122	4	2.71	.901	4	0	3	207	10	0	2.90	.900

== Awards and honours ==
Award	Year
College
WCHA All-Tournament Team	2007
All-WCHA Second Team	2008
ECHL
Goaltender of the Year	2009
First All-Star Team	2009
All-Rookie Team	2009
