= 2002–03 USHL season =

2002-03 USHL season
- League: United States Hockey League
- Sport: Ice hockey
- Duration: September 2002 – April 29, 2003
- Games: 60
- Teams: 11

Draft
- Top draft pick: Spencer Dillon
- Picked by: Waterloo Black Hawks

Regular season
- Anderson Cup: Lincoln Stars
- Season MVP: Ryan Potulny (Lincoln Stars)
- Top scorer: Ryan Potulny (Lincoln Stars)

Clark Cup Playoffs
- Clark Cup Playoffs MVP: Danny Irmen (Stars)
- Finals champions: Lincoln Stars
- Runners-up: River City Lancers

USHL seasons
- 2001–02 2003–04

The 2002–03 USHL season is the 24th season of the United States Hockey League as an all-junior league. The regular season began on September 27, 2002, and concluded on March 30, 2003, with the regular season champion winning the Anderson Cup. The 2002–03 season was the first for the River City Lancers after relocating to Council Bluffs, Iowa, from Omaha, Nebraska, and the last for the Topeka ScareCrows, which relocated to Chesterfield, Missouri, after the season concluded.

The Clark Cup playoffs features the top eight team from the eleven-team league regardless of division competing for the league title.

== Regular season ==
Final standings

Note: GP = Games played; W = Wins; L = Losses; OTL = Overtime losses; SL = Shootout losses; GF = Goals for; GA = Goals against; PTS = Points; x = clinched playoff berth; y = clinched division title; z = clinched league title

=== East Division ===
Team	GP	W	L	OTL	PTS	GF	GA
yWaterloo Black Hawks	60	38	17	5	81	221	171
xCedar Rapids RoughRiders	60	27	26	7	61	157	180
xDes Moines Buccaneers	60	27	27	6	60	200	223
Chicago Steel	60	26	28	6	59	178	204
Green Bay Gamblers	60	16	36	8	40	139	215

=== West Division ===
Team	GP	W	L	OTL	PTS	GF	GA
zLincoln Stars	60	37	14	9	83	214	153
xTopeka ScareCrows	60	36	17	7	79	211	166
xSioux City Musketeers	60	36	18	6	78	210	186
xRiver City Lancers	60	36	19	5	77	178	149
xTri-City Storm	60	27	28	5	59	183	200
Sioux Falls Stampede	60	24	30	6	54	179	223

== Clark Cup playoffs ==
Quarter-finals
1	Lincoln	5	4	6	–	–
8	Tri-City	3	1	0	–	–
3	Topeka	2	2	2	2	–
6	Cedar Rapids	3	1	3	4	–
2	Waterloo	6	3	5	5	–
7	Des Moines	3	7	2	4	–
4	Sioux City	2	2	4	1	–
5	River City	5	3	1	4	–

Semi-finals
1	Lincoln	6	3	5	–	–
6	Cedar Rapids	3	2	2	–	–
2	River City	2	4	3	–	–
5	Waterloo	0	3	1	–	–

Clark Cup Championship
1	Lincoln	3	0	4	5	–
2	River City	2	2	1	1	–

== Quarterfinals ==
=== (1) Lincoln Stars vs. (8) Tri-City Storm ===
April 2	Tri-City Storm	3 – 5	Lincoln Stars	Viaero Center	Recap
Scott Parse (1) - 16:29; Steve Wagner (1) - 19:59		First period	10:42 - David Backes (1)
No scoring		Second period	15:30 - pp - Chris Porter (1); 17:33 - Danny Irmen (1)
Mark Agnew (1) - 4:55		Third period	12:29 - Danny Irmen (2); 19:10 - en - Ben Gordon (1)
Eric Aarnio (29 saves / 33 shots)		Goalie stats	Nate Ziegelman (23 saves / 26 shots)

April 4	Lincoln Stars	4 – 1	Tri-City Storm	Ice Box	Recap
13:20 - Jeff McFarland (1)		First period	No scoring
19:22 - Ryan Potulny (1); 19:51 - pp - Danny Irmen (3)		Second period	No scoring
16:09 - pp - Chris Porter (2)		Third period	Scott Parse (2) - 5:36
Jean-Philippe Lamoureux (22 saves / 23 shots)		Goalie stats	Eric Aarnio (36 saves / 40 shots)

April 5	Lincoln Stars	6 – 0	Tri-City Storm	Ice Box	Recap
Danny Irmen (4) - 0:26; Brent Borgen (1) - 1:55		First period	No scoring
John Snowden (1) - 2:13; Ben Gordon (2) - pp - 18:20		Second period	No scoring
Ryan Potulny (2) - 1:25; Ben Gordon (3) - pp - 17:39		Third period	No scoring
Nate Ziegelman (23 saves / 23 shots)		Goalie stats	Eric Aarnio (22 saves / 26 shots); Casey Mapes (9 saves / 11 shots)

Lincoln wins series 3 – 0

=== (3) Topeka Scarecrows vs. (6) Cedar Rapids RoughRiders ===
April 2	Topeka ScareCrows	2 – 3	2OT	Cedar Rapids RoughRiders	Kansas Expocentre	Recap
9:56 - Erik Fabian (1)		First period		No scoring
No scoring		Second period		Mike Manley (1) - pp - 7:30
13:20 - pp - Rob Rankin (1)		Third period		Tyler Howells (1) - 16:55
No scoring		Second overtime period		Matt Olinger (1) - 7:07
Michael Zacharias (33 saves / 36 shots)		Goalie stats		Joe Fallon (31 saves / 33 shots)

April 3	Topeka ScareCrows	2 – 1	Cedar Rapids RoughRiders	Kansas Expocentre	Recap
No scoring		First period	No scoring
No scoring		Second period	Tyler Howells (2) - 8:05
2:51 - James Unger (1); 10:22 - Eric Vesely (1)		Third period	No scoring
Michael Zacharias (15 saves / 16 shots)		Goalie stats	Joe Fallon (50 saves / 52 shots)

April 5	Cedar Rapids RoughRiders	3 – 2	Topeka ScareCrows	Cedar Rapids Ice Arena	Recap
No scoring		First period	No scoring
19:08 - pp - Troy Brummett (1)		Second period	No scoring
0:47 - Jon Grabarek (1); 19:31 - pp - Matt Olinger (2)		Third period	J.P. Platisha (1) - pp - 6:08; Eric Vesely (2) - 17:08
Joe Fallon (35 saves / 37 shots)		Goalie stats	Michael Zacharias (29 saves / 32 shots)

April 6	Cedar Rapids RoughRiders	4 – 2	Topeka ScareCrows	Cedar Rapids Ice Arena	Recap
3:28 - Troy Brummett (2)		First period	Luke Erickson (1) - 9:02
2:44 - Chase Watson (1)		Second period	Eric Vesely (3) - sh - 7:40
4:43 - pp - Chase Watson (2); 18:56 - en - Zach Pearson (1)		Third period	No scoring
Joe Fallon (19 saves / 21 shots)		Goalie stats	Michael Zacharias (16 saves / 19 shots)

Cedar Rapids wins series 3 – 1

=== (2) Waterloo Black Hawks vs. (7) Des Moines Buccaneers ===
April 2	Waterloo Black Hawks	6 – 3	Des Moines Buccaneers	Young Arena	Recap
5:34 - Derek Whitmore (1); 18:23 - pp - Jon Saunders (1)		First period	No scoring
0:56 - Joe Pavelski (1)		Second period	Marty Mjelleli (1) - 2:36
5:29 - Ross Carlson (1); 9:44 - Joel Hanson (1)		Third period	Marty Mjelleli (2) - 2:26; Jamie Hoffmann (1) - 10:16
Jordan Parise (20 saves / 23 shots)		Goalie stats	A.J. Bucchino (51 saves / 56 shots)

April 4	Des Moines Buccaneers	7 – 3	Waterloo Black Hawks	Buccaneer Arena	Recap
Mike Erickson (1) 2:53; Kyle Bushee (1) - 3:53; Joe Campbell (1) - 16:15; Bryce Anderson (1) - 17:04		First period	No scoring
Tomáš Jasko (1) - 15:32		Second period	0:43 - Joe Pavelski (2); 13:57 - Igor Bobček (1)
Marty Mjelleli (3) - 4:33; Evan Stoflet (1) - 14:31		Third period	15:03 - pp - Rob Lehtinen (1)
A.J. Bucchino (39 saves / 42 shots)		Goalie stats	Jeff Jakaitis (2 saves / 4 shots); Jordan Parise (32 saves / 37 shots)

April 5	Waterloo Black Hawks	5 – 2	Des Moines Buccaneers	Young Arena	Recap
Joel Hanson (2) - 1:08		First period	No scoring
Matt Fornataro (1) - 11:57; Joel Hanson (3) - 13:53		Second period	4:41 - Joel Kitchen (1)
Joel Hanson (4) - pp - 11:37; Joe Pavelski (3) - sh - 19:43		Third period	15:36 - Patrick Borgestad (1)
Jordan Parise (24 saves / 26 shots)		Goalie stats	A.J. Bucchino (43 saves / 48 shots)

April 8	Des Moines Buccaneers	4 – 5	2OT	Waterloo Black Hawks	Buccaneer Arena	Recap
5:51 - Marty Guerin (1); 13:47 - Tomáš Jasko (2)		First period		Rob Lehtinen (2) - 8:56
4:52 - pp - Joel Kitchen (2)		Second period		Ross Carlson (3) - pp - 2:09; Jon Saunders (2) - 3:06; Ross Carlson (4) - pp - 11:44
2:00 - Joel Kitchen (3)		Third period		No scoring
No scoring		Second overtime period		Matt Fornataro (2) - 10:03
A.J. Bucchino (57 saves / 62 shots)		Goalie stats		Jordan Parise (29 saves / 33 shots)

Waterloo wins series 3 – 1

=== (4) Sioux City Musketeers vs. (5) River City Lancers ===
April 1	Sioux City Musketeers	2 – 5	River City Lancers	Tyson Events Center	Recap
No scoring		First period	Yale Lewis (1) - 18:51
7:25 - pp - Johann Kroll (1)		Second period	Mike Howe (1) - pp - 14:12
9:24 - Mike Ramirez (1)		Third period	Drew Miller (1) - sh - 3:20; Grant Clafton (1) - 6:13; Matt Carle (1) - en - 18:57
Ján Chovan (35 saves / 39 shots)		Goalie stats	Dominic Vicari (32 saves / 34 shots)

April 3	Sioux City Musketeers	2 – 3	OT	River City Lancers	Tyson Events Center	Recap
No scoring		First period		No scoring
11:41 - Nathan Schwartzbauer (1)		Second period		Janne Jokila (1) - pp - 5:39; Nate Raduns (1) - 6:37
6:18 - pp - Mike Curry (1)		Third period		No scoring
No scoring		First overtime period		Grant Clafton (2) - 2:23
Ján Chovan (45 saves / 48 shots)		Goalie stats		Dominic Vicari (17 saves / 19 shots)

April 5	River City Lancers	1 – 4	Sioux City Musketeers	Omaha Civic Auditorium	Recap
No scoring		First period	No scoring
No scoring		Second period	Brandon Polich (1) - 4:16; Mike Ramirez (2) - 7:46; Ryan Hawkins (1) - 14:38
10:57 - Corey Carlson (1)		Third period	B.J. Greaves (1) - en - 17:56
Dominic Vicari (20 saves / 23 shots)		Goalie stats	Ján Chovan (34 saves / 35 shots)

April 6	River City Lancers	4 – 1	Sioux City Musketeers	Omaha Civic Auditorium	Recap
No scoring		First period	Bill Magnuson (1) - 15:47
3:40 - Charlie Kronschnabel (1); 11:00 - pp - Drew Miller (2)		Second period	No scoring
6:45 - Charlie Kronschnabel (2); 15:42 - Mike Howe (2)		Third period	No scoring
Dominic Vicari (23 saves / 24 shots)		Goalie stats	Ján Chovan (39 saves / 43 shots)

River City wins series 3 – 1

== Semifinals ==
=== (1) Lincoln Stars vs. (6) Cedar Rapids RoughRiders ===
April 11	Lincoln Stars	6 – 3	Cedar Rapids RoughRiders	Ice Box	Recap
3:47 - pp - Danny Irmen (5); 4:06 - Matt Hayek (1); 7:24 - Tyler Magura (1); 10:27 - sh - David Backes (2); 14:43 - Matt Hayek (2)		First period	Jon Grabarek (2) - pp - 13:44
No scoring		Second period	No scoring
9:27 - pp - Ben Gordon (4)		Third period	Matt Olinger (3) - 3:33; Chris Snavely (1) - pp - 8:07
Jean-Philippe Lamoureux (22 saves / 25 shots); Nate Ziegelmann (5 saves / 5 shots)		Goalie stats	Joe Fallon (21 saves / 26 shots); Wes Russell (8 saves / 9 shots)

April 12	Lincoln Stars	3 – 2	Cedar Rapids RoughRiders	Ice Box	Recap
18:18 - pp - Per Mårs (1)		First period	No scoring
15:50 - Chris Porter (3)		Second period	No scoring
0:10 - Ryan Potulny (3)		Third period	Mike Manley (2) - 1:59; Mike Pasley (1) - 19:49
Nate Ziegelmann (27 saves / 29 shots)		Goalie stats	Joe Fallon (23 saves / 26 shots)

April 15	Cedar Rapids RoughRiders	2 – 5	Lincoln Stars	Cedar Rapids Ice Arena	Recap
11:29 - Chris Snavely (2)		First period	Ryan Potulny (3) - pp - 17:06
0:36 - Chase Watson (3)		Second period	John Snowden (2) - 1:53; John Snowden (3) - 19:42
No scoring		Third period	Ben Gordon (5) - 1:58; David Backes (3) - pp - 16:38
Joe Fallon (41 saves / 46 shots)		Goalie stats	Nate Ziegelmann (24 saves / 26 shots)

Lincoln wins series 3 – 0

=== (2) River City Lancers vs. (5) Waterloo Black Hawks ===
April 11	Waterloo Black Hawks	0 – 2	River City Lancers	Young Arena	Recap
No scoring		First period	1:49 - John Togiai (1); 4:12 - Drew Miller (3)
No scoring		Second period	No scoring
No scoring		Third period	No scoring
Jordan Parise (28 saves / 30 shots)		Goalie stats	Dominic Vicari (29 saves / 29 shots)

April 12	Waterloo Black Hawks	3 – 4	River City Lancers	Young Arena	Recap
Joe Pavelski (4) - 4:54		First period	No scoring
Yale Lewis (2) - 8:52; Taylor Jindra (1) - 11:41		Second period	7:35 - pp - Andy Nelson (1); 10:04 - pp - Janne Jokila (1); 15:05 - pp - Joel Hanson (5)
No scoring		Third period	16:45 - Nathan Gerbe (1)
Jeff Jakaitis (35 saves / 39 shots)		Goalie stats	Dominic Vicari (34 saves / 37 shots)

April 15	River City Lancers	3 – 1	Waterloo Black Hawks	Omaha Civic Auditorium	Recap
Taylor Jindra (2) - 8:24		First period	1:21 - Joe Pavelski (5)
No scoring		Second period	No scoring
Phil Todd (1) - 6:25; Drew Miller (3) - en - 19:58		Third period	No scoring
Dominic Vicari (19 saves / 20 shots)		Goalie stats	Jordan Parise (42 saves / 44 shots)

River City wins series 3 – 0

== Clark Cup Finals ==
=== (1) Lincoln Stars vs. (2) River City Lancers ===
April 22	Lincoln Stars	3 – 2	OT	River City Lancers	Ice Box	Recap
No scoring		First period		No scoring
No scoring		Second period		No scoring
6:09 - Matt Hayek (3); 9:49 - Jeff McFarland (2)		Third period		Taylor Jindra (3) - 14:44; Mike Howe (3) - pp - 16:34
0:25 - Ryan Potulny (4)		First overtime period		No scoring
Nate Ziegelmann (31 saves / 33 shots)		Goalie stats		Dominic Vicari (36 saves / 39 shots)

April 25	River City Lancers	2 – 0	Lincoln Stars	Omaha Civic Auditorium	Recap
No scoring		First period	No scoring
Mike Howe (4) - 1:22; Matt Carle (2) - pp - 4:00		Second period	No scoring
No scoring		Third period	No scoring
Dominic Vicari (28 saves / 28 shots)		Goalie stats	Nate Ziegelmann (28 saves / 30 shots)

April 26	Lincoln Stars	4 – 1	River City Lancers	Ice Box	Recap
No scoring		First period	No scoring
Ryan Potulny (5) - pp - 1:05; Danny Irmen (6) - 16:32; Mike Eickman (1) - pp - 19:24		Second period	11:07 - Jason Dest (1)
Ben Gordon (6) - en - 18:13		Third period	No scoring
Jean-Philippe Lamoureux (35 saves / 36 shots)		Goalie stats	Dominic Vicari (32 saves / 35 shots)

April 29	River City Lancers	1 – 5	Lincoln Stars	Omaha Civic Auditorium	Recap
No scoring		First period	Danny Irmen (7) - 16:58
8:29 - sh - Drew Miller (4)		Second period	David Backes (4) - sh - 12:22; Ethan Graham (1) - 14:03
No scoring		Third period	Chris Porter (3) - 7:04; Danny Irmen (8) - en - 17:21
Dominic Vicari (24 saves / 28 shots)		Goalie stats	Jean-Philippe Lamoureux (35 saves / 36 shots)

Lincoln wins series 3 – 1

== Players ==
=== Scoring leaders ===
	Player	Team	GP	G	A	Pts	+/-	PIM
1	Ryan Potulny	Lincoln Stars	54	35	43	78	+32	18
2	Luke Erickson	Lincoln/Topeka	64	31	40	71	+21	72
3	Joe Pavelski	Waterloo Black Hawks	60	36	33	69	+26	32
	David Backes	Lincoln Stars	57	28	41	69	+10	126
5	Jacob Micflikier	Sioux Falls Stampede	59	31	36	67	+5	26
	Tomáš Jasko	Des Moines Buccaneers	60	30	37	67	-3	33
7	Morod Radmacher	Sioux Falls Stampede	60	26	38	64	-3	50
8	Marty Guerin	Des Moines Buccaneers	60	27	33	60	+14	30
	Grant Goeckner-Zoeller	Sioux City Musketeers	60	27	33	60	+19	60
	Brandon Polich	Sioux City Musketeers	60	17	43	60	+20	79

=== Leading goaltenders ===
	Player	Team	GP	MIN	W	L	OTL	SO	GA	GAA	SV	SV%
1	Dominic Vicari	River City Lancers	45	2507	28	14	2	6	85	2.03	902	.914
2	Jean-Philippe Lamoureux	Lincoln Stars	34	1967	22	7	4	4	71	2.16	781	.917
3	Jordan Parise	Waterloo Black Hawks	35	1927	21	10	2	2	82	2.55	878	.915
	Michael Zacharias	Topeka ScareCrows	27	1578	14	7	4	2	67	2.55	545	.891
5	Nate Ziegelmann	Lincoln Stars	28	1672	15	7	5	1	72	2.58	713	.908

== Awards ==
- Coach of the Year: P.K. O'Handley Waterloo Black Hawks
- Curt Hammer Award: Jake Taylor Green Bay Gamblers
- Defenseman of the Year: Matt Carle River City Lancers
- Forward of the Year: Ryan Potulny Lincoln Stars
- General Manager of the Year: P.K. O'Handley Waterloo Black Hawks
- Goaltender of the Year: Dominic Vicari River City Lancers
- Organization of the Year: Waterloo Black Hawks
- Player of the Year: Ryan Potulny Lincoln Stars
- Rookie of the Year: Joe Pavelski Waterloo Black Hawks
