= Ben Gordon (ice hockey) =

American ice hockey player (born 1985)

- Born: January 31, 1985 (age 41) St. Michael, Minnesota, U.S.
- Height: 5 ft 11 in (180 cm)
- Weight: 162 lb (73 kg; 11 st 8 lb)
- Position: Left wing
- Shot: Left
- Played for: Providence Bruins; Toronto Marlies; Abbotsford Heat; Rochester Americans; Binghamton Senators; Düsseldorfer EG
- NHL draft: Undrafted
- Playing career: 2008–2014 Coaching career

Current position
- Title: Assistant coach
- Team: Minnesota
- Conference: Big Ten

Biographical details
- Education: University of Minnesota

Coaching career (HC unless noted)
- 2014–2015: St. Scholastica (Assistant)
- 2015–2016: Tri-City Storm (Assistant)
- 2016–2017: Minnesota (Dir. of Hockey Ops)
- 2017–2018: Chicago Steel (Associate)
- 2018–2019: Des Moines Buccaneers (Assistant)
- 2018–Present: Minnesota (Assistant)

Ben Gordon (born January 31, 1985) is an American former professional ice hockey forward.

== Career ==
Gordon played for the Providence Bruins, Toronto Marlies, Abbotsford Heat, Rochester Americans, Binghamton Senators, and Düsseldorfer EG. He completed his career as a member of the Tulsa Oilers in the Central Hockey League. On October 10, 2014, Gordon retired from his professional playing career, in accepting an assistant coaching role with the College of St. Scholastica in Minnesota.

== Career statistics ==
			Regular season					Playoffs
Season	Team	League	GP	G	A	Pts	PIM	GP	G	A	Pts	PIM
2002–03	Lincoln Stars	USHL	24	4	6	10	14	10	6	1	7	14
2003–04	Lincoln Stars	USHL	44	9	19	28	32	—	—	—	—	—
2004–05	University of Minnesota	WCHA	24	0	9	9	31	—	—	—	—	—
2005–06	University of Minnesota	WCHA	37	12	17	29	24	—	—	—	—	—
2006–07	University of Minnesota	WCHA	42	12	19	31	58	—	—	—	—	—
2007–08	University of Minnesota	WCHA	45	15	14	29	32	—	—	—	—	—
2008–09	Cincinnati Cyclones	ECHL	51	15	24	39	34	—	—	—	—	—
2008–09	Reading Royals	ECHL	12	6	12	18	14	—	—	—	—	—
2009–10	Reading Royals	ECHL	56	24	45	69	57	16	2	12	14	8
2009–10	Providence Bruins	AHL	2	0	0	0	2	—	—	—	—	—
2009–10	Toronto Marlies	AHL	7	2	3	5	2	—	—	—	—	—
2009–10	Abbotsford Heat	AHL	7	0	2	2	2	—	—	—	—	—
2010–11	Reading Royals	ECHL	56	23	34	57	53	8	2	2	4	12
2010–11	Rochester Americans	AHL	6	0	2	2	2	—	—	—	—	—
2010–11	Binghamton Senators	AHL	3	1	0	1	0	—	—	—	—	—
2011–12	Düsseldorfer EG	DEL	49	10	22	32	42	7	0	3	3	6
2012–13	Tulsa Oilers	CHL	52	26	40	66	46	—	—	—	—	—
2013–14	Tulsa Oilers	CHL	61	36	53	89	56	6	4	3	7	8
AHL totals			25	3	7	10	8	—	—	—	—	—

== Awards and honors ==
Award	Year
USHL Clark Cup Champion	2002–03
All-CHL Team (First Team All-Star)	2013–14
