= St. Louis Heartland Eagles =

Junior hockey team in St. Louis, Missouri, US

- City: Chesterfield, Missouri
- League: USHL
- Division: Eastern
- Founded: 2001
- Folded: 2004
- Home arena: Hardee's Iceplex
- Colors: Blue, Red, Yellow
- General manager: Rick Zombo
- Head coach: Rick Zombo
- Media: 104.5 FM KSLQ

Franchise history
- 2001–2003: Topeka ScareCrows
- 2003–2004: St. Louis Heartland Eagles

The St. Louis Heartland Eagles was a Tier I junior ice hockey team playing in the East Division of the United States Hockey League (USHL). The USHL is the top junior hockey league in the United States, the league is geared for the development of 17 to 20-year-old players as a step between high school and lower jr. hockey levels and college and professional ice hockey.

The Eagles's home ice was The Summit Center in Chesterfield, Missouri (about 30 minutes west of downtown St. Louis on I-64). The Summit Center, now Hardee's Iceplex, is also the former home of the NAHL's St. Louis Bandits.

== History ==
The franchise was part of the United States Hockey League as the Topeka ScareCrows from 2001 to 2003. In 2003 the USHL ScareCrows were moved to St. Louis, Missouri for the 2003–04 season and renamed the Heartland Eagles. The team struggled on and off the ice in St. Louis. The team finished in last place in the East Division and also suffered from low attendance. The Heartland Eagles were granted a one-year voluntary suspension of operations and did not play during the 2004–05 USHL season. The franchise folded in the summer of 2005 after failing to find a more suitable home for the team in the St. Louis metro area.

The Eagle's head coach and general manager for the team's only season in St. Louis was Rick Zombo, an ex-Detroit Red Wings, ex-St. Louis Blues defenseman. Assistant coach was Joe Coombs.

Coombs went on to coach the Topeka Tarantulas of the CHL for the 2004–05 season, but the team folded after only one year.

Phil Giubileo was the team's broadcaster and he departed for the Danbury Trashers after the Eagles' collapse.

== Regular season records ==
Season	GP	W	L	OTL	SOL	PTS	GF	GA	Finish	Postseason
Topeka ScareCrows
2001–02	61	25	30	6	0	56	198	225	6th of 7, Western Conf. 10th of 14, USHL	Did non qualify
2002–03	60	36	17	0	7	79	211	166	2nd of 6, Western Conf. 3rd of 12, USHL	Lost Quarterfinal series, 1–3 (Cedar Rapids RoughRiders)
St. Louis Heartland Eagles
2003–04	60	17	37	1	5	40	135	229	6th of 6, Eastern Conf. 11th of 12, USHL	Did non qualify

== Alumni ==
Despite only lasting one season the Heartland Eagles advanced a number of players to college, major junior, and professional hockey, including:

- Corey Elkins - Los Angeles Kings (NHL), Ohio State University (CCHA)
- Justin Mercier - Colorado Avalanche (NHL), Miami University (CCHA)
