= Rick Zombo =

American ice hockey player and coach (born 1963)

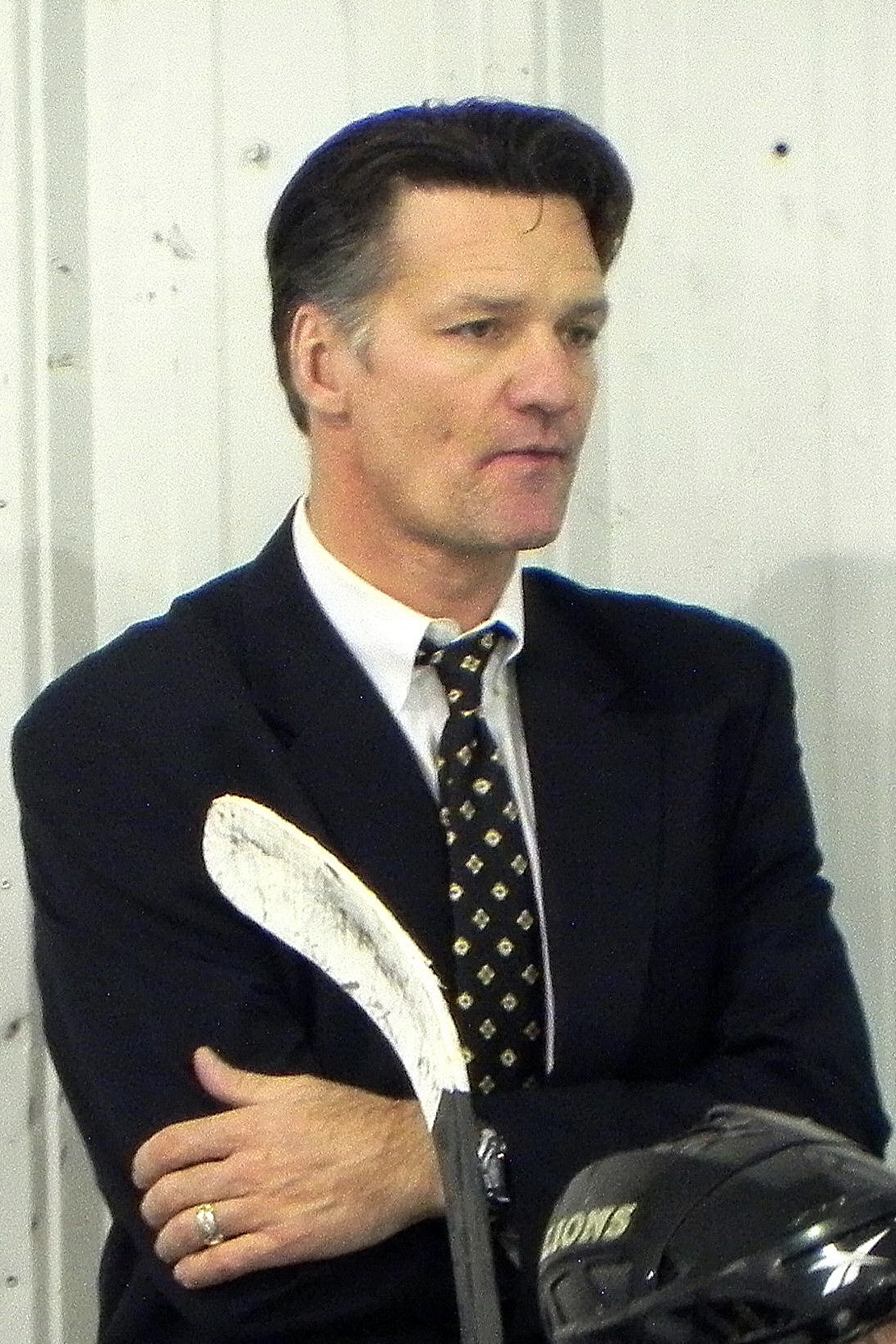
- Born: May 8, 1963 (age 63) Des Plaines, Illinois, U.S.
- Height: 6 ft 1 in (185 cm)
- Weight: 202 lb (92 kg; 14 st 6 lb)
- Position: Defense
- Shot: Right
- Played for: Detroit Red Wings; St. Louis Blues; Boston Bruins
- National team: United States
- NHL draft: 149th overall, 1981; Detroit Red Wings
- Playing career: 1984–1997
- Coaching career

Biographical details
- Education: University of North Dakota

Coaching career (HC unless noted)
- 2008–2010: Lindenwood (assistant)
- 2010–2024: Lindenwood

Head coaching record
- Overall: 13–40–5 (.267) [varsity]

Accomplishments and honors

Championships
- 2009 ACHA National Championship (asst.); 2010 ACHA National Championship (asst.); 2016 ACHA National Championship; 2022 ACHA National Championship

Richard James Zombo (born May 8, 1963) is an American former professional ice hockey defenseman who played in the National Hockey League (NHL) for 12 seasons between 1984 and 1996. He was the men's ice hockey head coach at Lindenwood University for 14 years.

== Playing career ==
=== Junior/NCAA Hockey ===
Zombo played with the Austin Mavericks the USHL as a 17-year-old during the 1980–81 season, earning 36 points in 43 games. In the 1981 NHL entry draft, the Detroit Red Wings drafted Zombo in the 8th round, 149th overall. Despite being drafted, Zombo decided to attend the University of North Dakota and play hockey with their team, the North Dakota Fighting Sioux.

In his freshman season with North Dakota, Zombo appeared in 45 games, registering 16 points, as he helped the team win the 1982 NCAA National Championship as the Fighting Sioux defeated the Wisconsin Badgers 5–2 in the championship game. In 1982–83, Zombo would once again earn 16 points, and he would earn a spot on the US National Team in the World Junior Hockey Championships, where he went pointless in seven games. Zombo saw his offensive numbers explode in the 1983–84 season with North Dakota, as he recorded 31 points in 34 games in what would be his last season with the Fighting Sioux.

=== Professional career ===
==== Detroit Red Wings ====
Zombo played the 1984–85 season with the Adirondack Red Wings of the AHL, playing in 56 games, as he had three goals and 35 points. Zombo also appeared in his first NHL game during the season, going pointless with the Detroit Red Wings. He spent most of the 1985–86 season with Adirondack, improving his numbers to seven goals and 41 points in 69 games, while appearing in 14 games with Detroit, recording an assist. In the 1986 playoffs with Adirondack, he earned four points in 17 games as the Red Wings won the Calder Cup. Zombo began the 1986–87 season in Adirondack once again, earning six points in 25 games, before being called up to Detroit for the rest of the season, where he earned five points in 44 games with Detroit, while adding an assist in seven playoff games. The 1987–88 season was Zombo's first full season in the NHL, where he had 17 points in 62 games, along with an impressive +24 rating, helping Detroit win the Norris Division. In the playoffs, Zombo had six assists in 16 games, as the Red Wings lost to the Edmonton Oilers in the Campbell Conference finals. Zombo improved in the 1988–89 season, earning 21 points in 75 games, as well as a +22 rating, as Detroit once again won the Norris Division championship. The Red Wings struggled in the playoffs, and were upset by the Chicago Blackhawks in the first round, where Zombo had an assist in six games. Zombo had the best season of his career in 1989–90, as he scored a career high five goals and 25 points in 77 games, however, the Red Wings did not qualify for the post-season as they finished in last place in the Norris Division. The 1990–91 season saw Zombo named as one of the Red Wings' three alternate captains. His offensive numbers slipped a little bit, as he fell to four goals and 23 points in 77 games with Detroit, but the club would return to the playoffs. The Red Wings would push the heavily favored St. Louis Blues to seven games before being eliminated in the first round. Zombo had a goal in seven post-season games. Zombo began the 1991–92 season with Detroit, going pointless in three games, before being traded to the St. Louis Blues on October 18, 1991, for goaltender Vincent Riendeau.

==== St. Louis Blues ====
Zombo played in 64 games with the St. Louis Blues in the 1991–92 season, earning 18 points, helping the team make the playoffs. In the first round, the Blues were eliminated by the Chicago Blackhawks, and Zombo had two assists in six games. His offensive numbers continued to slump during the 1992–93 season, as Zombo had no goals and 15 assists in 71 games with the Blues. Zombo added a point in 11 playoff games, as well as a poor rating of −9 as the St. Louis lost in the second round. Zombo continued to struggle in the 1993–94 season, earning 10 points in 74 games with a −15 rating during the regular season. Zombo was suspended for 10 regular season games after NHL Vice President Brian Burke ruled that he deliberately hit linesman Kevin Collins in a game against Dallas on January 9, 1994. In the playoffs, the Blues were swept by the Dallas Stars in the first round, as Zombo had no points in four games. In the lockout shortened season in 1994–95, Zombo appeared in only 23 games, earning five points with the Blues, before going pointless in three playoff games. On October 2, 1995, the Blues traded Zombo to the Boston Bruins in exchange for Fred Knipscheer.

==== Boston Bruins ====
Zombo played the 1995–96 season with the Boston Bruins, where he had 14 points in 67 games. Boston qualified for the playoffs, but Zombo would not see any playoff action, and after the season the Bruins let him become a free agent.

==== Los Angeles ====
On December 13, 1996, the Los Angeles Kings signed Zombo to a contract, and sent him to play with the Phoenix Roadrunners of the IHL. In 23 games with the Roadrunners, Zombo had six points. After the season, Zombo announced his retirement from the game.

== Awards and honors ==
Award	Year
All-WCHA Second Team	1983–84

== Career statistics ==
=== Regular season and playoffs ===
			Regular season					Playoffs
Season	Team	League	GP	G	A	Pts	PIM	GP	G	A	Pts	PIM
1979–80	Royal York Selects AAA	Midget
1980–81	Austin Mavericks	USHL	43	10	26	36	73	—	—	—	—	—
1981–82	North Dakota Fighting Sioux	WCHA	45	1	15	16	31	—	—	—	—	—
1982–83	North Dakota Fighting Sioux	WCHA	33	5	11	16	41	—	—	—	—	—
1983–84	North Dakota Fighting Sioux	WCHA	37	7	24	31	40	—	—	—	—	—
1984–85	Adirondack Red Wings	AHL	56	3	32	35	70	—	—	—	—	—
1984–85	Detroit Red Wings	NHL	1	0	0	0	0	—	—	—	—	—
1985–86	Adirondack Red Wings	AHL	69	7	34	41	94	17	0	4	4	40
1985–86	Detroit Red Wings	NHL	14	0	1	1	16	—	—	—	—	—
1986–87	Adirondack Red Wings	AHL	25	0	6	6	22	—	—	—	—	—
1986–87	Detroit Red Wings	NHL	44	1	4	5	59	7	0	1	1	9
1987–88	Detroit Red Wings	NHL	62	3	14	17	96	16	0	6	6	55
1988–89	Detroit Red Wings	NHL	75	1	20	21	106	6	0	1	1	16
1989–90	Detroit Red Wings	NHL	77	5	20	25	95	—	—	—	—	—
1990–91	Detroit Red Wings	NHL	77	4	19	23	55	7	1	0	1	10
1991–92	Detroit Red Wings	NHL	3	0	0	0	15	—	—	—	—	—
1991–92	St. Louis Blues	NHL	64	3	15	18	46	6	0	2	2	12
1992–93	St. Louis Blues	NHL	71	0	15	15	78	11	0	1	1	12
1993–94	St. Louis Blues	NHL	74	2	8	10	85	4	0	0	0	11
1994–95	St. Louis Blues	NHL	23	1	4	5	24	3	0	0	0	2
1995–96	Boston Bruins	NHL	67	4	10	14	53	—	—	—	—	—
1996–97	Phoenix Roadrunners	IHL	23	0	6	6	22	—	—	—	—	—
NHL totals			652	24	130	154	728	60	1	11	12	127

=== International ===
Year	Team	Event	GP	G	A	Pts	PIM
1983	United States	WJC	7	0	0	0	0

== Retirement ==
Zombo helped found the Hockey Performance Center of St. Louis, Missouri.

== Coaching career ==
In 1998 Zombo was named head coach of the St. Louis Sting of the Tier II Jr. A North American Hockey League. Zombo remained head coach of the team from the 1998–99 season through 2000–01 season. Following the 2001 season the team relocated to Springfield, Missouri. He was named head coach of Marquette High School in Chesterfield, Missouri from the 2001–02 season through the 2002–2003 season. In 2003 Zombo resigned from Marquette and became the head coach and general manager of the St. Louis Heartland Eagles of the Tier I Jr. A USHL. He started as head coach in May 2003 and remained in that position for the 2003–04 season. Following the season the team suspended operations and folded after failing to find a more suitable facility.

In 2008, Zombo became an assistant coach at Lindenwood University in St. Charles, Missouri under head coach Derek Schaub. In the two seasons as assistant coach the team won back-to-back ACHA Division I Championships with a record of 80–9–0 in 89 games over the two seasons. On July 14, 2010 it was announced Zombo would become the school's second men's ice hockey head coach. Under Zombo the Lions won their third consecutive CSCHL Regular Season Championship with a regular season record with a 29–3–0. The Lions qualified for the 2011 national championship tournament and swept through the initial rounds of the tournament before they were defeated by Davenport University 2–3 in overtime of the championship game on March 9, 2011. The team finished the 2010–11 season with an overall record of 32–4–0 and 13–1–0 in the CSCHL. The Lions started the 2011-12 season with a record of 11-4-0, before the team recorded a 16-game win streak and ended the regular season with a record of 27-4. LU finished the regular season going undefeated in CSCHL conference play for the first time in the history of the program. The team also received an autobid with the CSCHL title to the 2012 ACHA DI National Tournament. The Lions defeated Central Oklahoma 5-2 in second round, after the team was seeded second and received a first round bye; followed by Minot State 7-4 in the quarterfinals. In the semifinal round, the Lions lost 3-6 to Delaware, the eventual 2012 ACHA DI Champions. The team finished the season with an overall record of 31-5.

=== Assistant coaching record ===
Team	Year	Regular season							Post season
Team	Year	G	W	L	T	OTL	Pts	Finish	Result
Lindenwood	2008–09	46	42	4	0	-	-	1st in CSCHL	ACHA DI champions
Lindenwood	2009–10	43	38	5	0	-	-	2nd in CSCHL	ACHA DI champions

=== Head coaching record ===
Team	Year	Regular season							Post season
Team	Year	G	W	L	T	OTL	Pts	Finish	Result
St. Louis Sting	1998–99	56	34	16	0	6	74	3rd in NAHL	3rd in NAHL
St. Louis Sting	1999–00	56	18	35	0	3	39	5th in NAHL West	Did not qualify
St. Louis Sting	2000–01	56	15	36	0	5	35	5th in NAHL West	Did not qualify
St. Louis Heartland Eagles	2003–04	60	17	37	0	6	40	6th in USHL East	Did not qualify
Lindenwood	2010–11	36	32	4	-	-	-	1st in CSCHL	National runner-up
Lindenwood	2011–12	36	31	5	-	-	-	1st in CSCHL	Nationals: 4th

=== College ===
Record table
Season	Coach	Overall	Conference	Standing	Postseason
Lindenwood Lions Independent (2022–2024)
2022–23	Lindenwood	7–22–1			
2023–24	Lindenwood	6–18–4			
Lindenwood:		13–40–5 (.267)			
Total:		13–40–5 (.267)			
National champion Postseason invitational champion Conference regular season champion Conference regular season and conference tournament champion Division regular season champion Division regular season and conference tournament champion Conference tournament champion
