= Chris Porter (ice hockey) =

Canadian-American ice hockey player

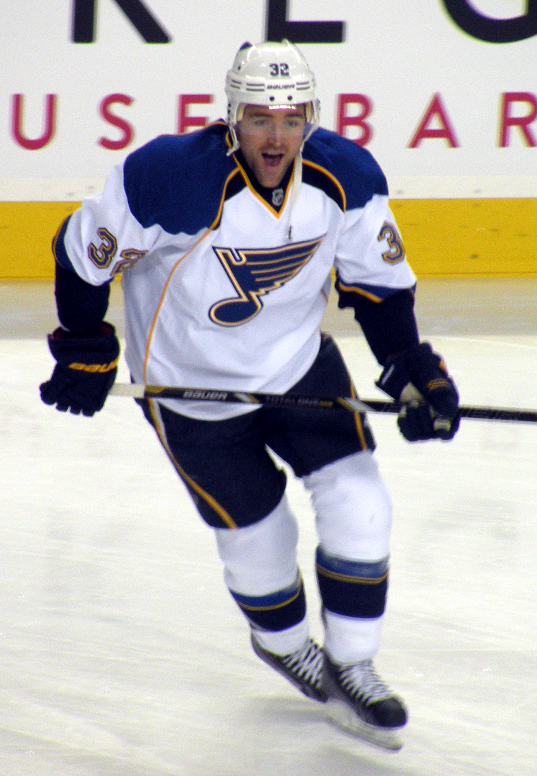
- Born: May 29, 1984 (age 42) Thunder Bay, Ontario, Canada
- Height: 6 ft 1 in (185 cm)
- Weight: 206 lb (93 kg; 14 st 10 lb)
- Position: Left wing
- Shot: Left
- Played for: St. Louis Blues; Minnesota Wild
- National team: United States
- NHL draft: 282nd overall, 2003; Chicago Blackhawks
- Playing career: 2007–2018

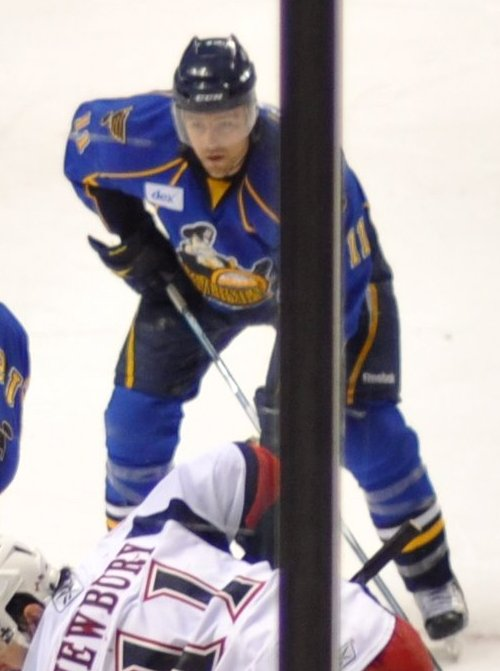
Porter as a member of the Peoria Rivermen

Chris Porter (born May 29, 1984 in Thunder Bay, Ontario) is a Canadian-American former professional ice hockey left winger who played in the National Hockey League for the St. Louis Blues and the Minnesota Wild. He was drafted in the ninth round, 282nd overall, by the Chicago Blackhawks in the 2003 NHL entry draft.

== Playing career ==
Prior to his professional career, Porter played collegiate hockey at the University of North Dakota. He spent four years at the University of North Dakota appearing in 175 games for the Fighting Sioux. He made his NHL debut with the Blues in the 2008–09 season opener. He scored his first career NHL goal on October 18, 2008 against the Chicago Blackhawks.

On July 16, 2012, Porter was re-signed as a free agent by the Blues to a one-year contract.

On August 8, 2015, Porter left the Blues organization as a free agent after 8 seasons and signed a one-year, two-way contract with the Philadelphia Flyers. Porter failed to earn a spot on the Flyers during training camp and was placed on waivers by the team on September 30, 2015. On October 1, 2015, prior to the 2015–16 season, he was claimed by the Minnesota Wild. Over the course of the campaign with the Wild, Porter consolidated his role on the fourth line, featuring in a career best 61 games for 4 goals and 7 points.

As a free agent, Porter was unable to attain an NHL contract over the summer. On September 12, 2016, Porter signed a professional try-out contract to attend training camp in a return to the St. Louis Blues. Unable to secure a contract in his return to the Blues, Porter was released and later signed on October 31, 2016, to a professional tryout agreement with the Providence Bruins of the AHL.

== Personal ==
Porter is close friends with University of North Dakota teammate and current NHL star of the Minnesota Wild, Zach Parise. He acted as best man at Parise's wedding as Parise did for him.

== Career statistics ==
=== Regular season and playoffs ===
			Regular season					Playoffs
Season	Team	League	GP	G	A	Pts	PIM	GP	G	A	Pts	PIM
2000–01	Shattuck–Saint Mary's 18U	HS Prep
2001–02	Shattuck–Saint Mary's 18U	HS Prep	75	10	25	35	32	—	—	—	—	—
2002–03	Lincoln Stars	USHL	59	13	22	35	74	10	4	3	7	10
2003–04	University of North Dakota	WCHA	41	10	15	25	46	—	—	—	—	—
2004–05	University of North Dakota	WCHA	43	12	3	15	36	—	—	—	—	—
2005–06	University of North Dakota	WCHA	46	7	16	23	40	—	—	—	—	—
2006–07	University of North Dakota	WCHA	43	13	17	30	38	—	—	—	—	—
2007–08	Peoria Rivermen	AHL	80	12	25	37	72	—	—	—	—	—
2008–09	St. Louis Blues	NHL	6	1	1	2	0	—	—	—	—	—
2008–09	Peoria Rivermen	AHL	74	7	16	23	72	7	1	1	2	0
2009–10	Peoria Rivermen	AHL	80	13	18	31	53	—	—	—	—	—
2010–11	Peoria Rivermen	AHL	36	9	11	20	63	—	—	—	—	—
2010–11	St. Louis Blues	NHL	45	3	4	7	16	—	—	—	—	—
2011–12	St. Louis Blues	NHL	47	4	3	7	11	—	—	—	—	—
2011–12	Peoria Rivermen	AHL	2	0	1	1	2	—	—	—	—	—
2012–13	Peoria Rivermen	AHL	12	7	3	10	11	—	—	—	—	—
2012–13	St. Louis Blues	NHL	29	2	6	8	0	6	1	0	1	0
2013–14	Chicago Wolves	AHL	38	7	11	18	37	—	—	—	—	—
2013–14	St. Louis Blues	NHL	22	0	1	1	0	6	1	2	3	0
2014–15	St. Louis Blues	NHL	24	1	1	2	6	3	0	1	1	0
2015–16	Minnesota Wild	NHL	61	4	3	7	6	6	1	0	1	0
2016–17	Providence Bruins	AHL	67	8	17	25	28	17	5	4	9	8
2017–18	Providence Bruins	AHL	52	2	8	10	31	2	0	0	0	0
AHL totals			441	65	110	175	368	26	6	5	11	8
NHL totals			234	15	19	34	39	21	3	3	6	0

=== International ===
Year	Team	Event	Result	GP	G	A	Pts	PIM
2011	United States	WC	8th	7	0	1	1	2
Senior totals				7	0	1	1	2
