= Joe Pavelski =

American ice hockey player (born 1984)

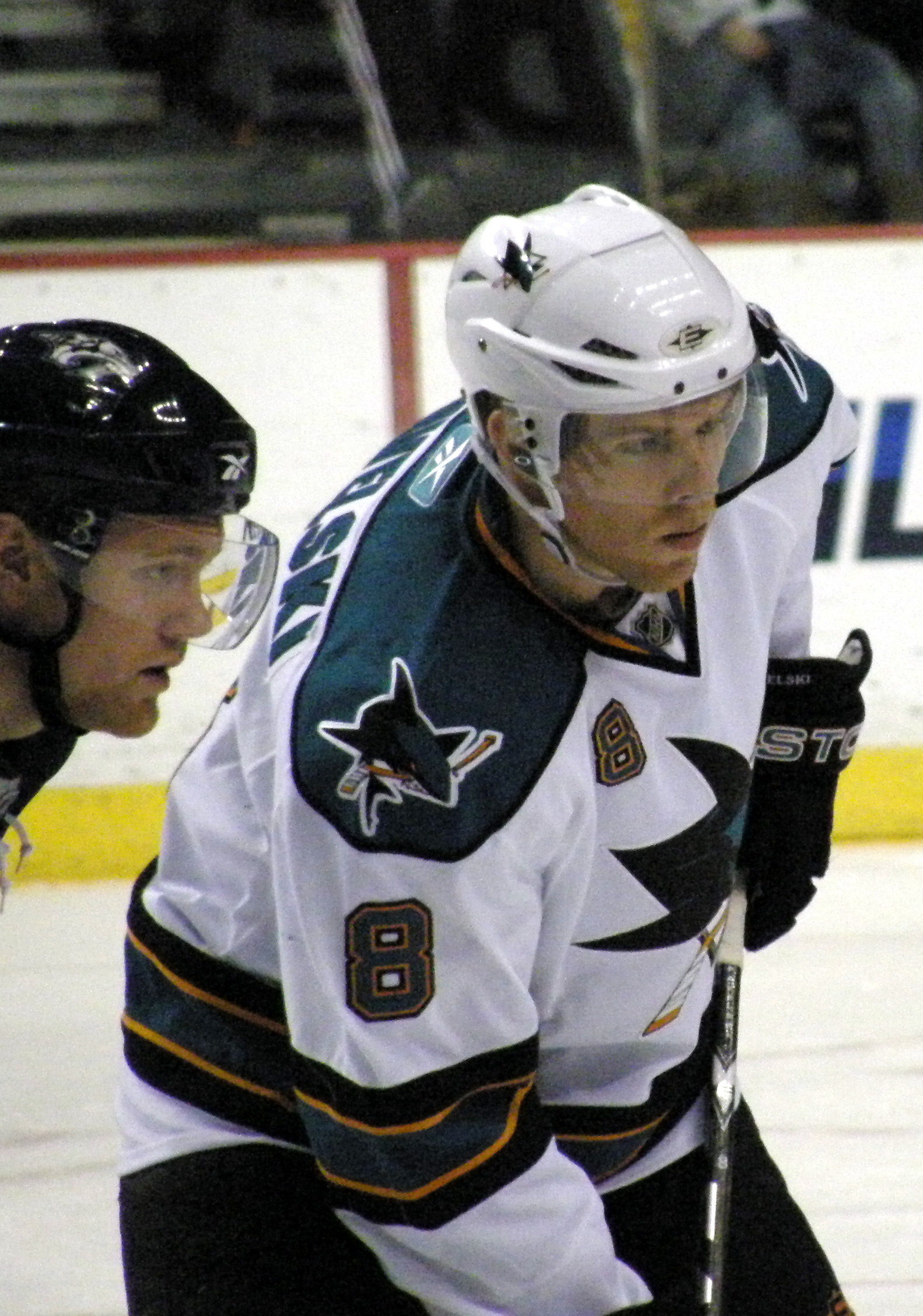
- Pavelski (right) with the San Jose Sharks in February 2010
- Born: July 11, 1984 (age 42) Plover, Wisconsin, U.S.
- Height: 5 ft 11 in (180 cm)
- Weight: 195 lb (88 kg; 13 st 13 lb)
- Position: Forward
- Shot: Right
- Played for: San Jose Sharks; Dinamo Minsk; Dallas Stars
- National team: United States
- NHL draft: 205th overall, 2003; San Jose Sharks
- Playing career: 2006–2024

Joseph James Pavelski (born July 11, 1984) is an American former professional ice hockey player who played 18 seasons in the National Hockey League (NHL) for the San Jose Sharks and Dallas Stars.

Pavelski attended the University of Wisconsin and played for the Wisconsin Badgers men's ice hockey team. He was subsequently drafted 205th overall in the seventh round of the 2003 NHL entry draft by the Sharks, with whom he spent the first thirteen years of his NHL career, additionally serving as captain during his final four years with the team. He is often regarded as one of the greatest Sharks of all time, having led the team to their first Stanley Cup Finals in 2016. After departing in free agency, he spent the final five seasons of his career in Dallas, with whom he made the Finals again in 2020.

Nicknamed "Little Joe" and "Captain America", Pavelski scored a goal in his first NHL game, making him the 11th Sharks player in the history of the team to do so. He holds the record for most playoff goals by an American-born player, with 74.

Internationally, Pavelski won a silver medal as a member of the United States men's national ice hockey team at the 2010 Winter Olympics in Vancouver. He also served as captain of Team USA at the 2016 World Cup of Hockey in Toronto.

== Early life ==
Pavelski was born on July 11, 1984, in Plover, Wisconsin, to parents Sandy and Mike Pavelski. His family is of Polish origin and their surname was originally spelled Pawelski. Pavelski grew up alongside three siblings, and although his younger brother, Scott, was a student-athlete for four years, he never played professionally.

== Playing career ==
=== Amateur ===
Pavelski won a Wisconsin State Hockey Championship with SPASH (Stevens Point Area Senior High) Panthers in 2002. He was a member of the 2004 Clark Cup champion Waterloo Black Hawks of the USHL. He won the 2004 USHL Dave Tyler Junior Player of the Year Award.

Pavelski played in 84 games over two seasons (2004–06) at the University of Wisconsin of the Western Collegiate Hockey Association He recorded 101 points (39–62). Pavelski was named to the All-WCHA Rookie Team in 2005, was selected to the All-WCHA Second Team, and the Men's RBK Division I West All-America Second Team. He helped Wisconsin win the 2006 NCAA Division I Men's Ice Hockey Tournament, while leading the team in overall points.

=== Professional (2006–2024) ===
==== San Jose Sharks (2006–2019) ====
Pavelski began his NHL career in the 2006–07 season. He began on a hot streak, scoring a goal in his first game, and scoring 7 goals and 10 points in his first 12 games. Pavelski earned the nickname "Little Joe" from Sharks announcer Randy Hahn, a reference to Pavelski's teammate and San Jose superstar "Jumbo Joe", Joe Thornton.

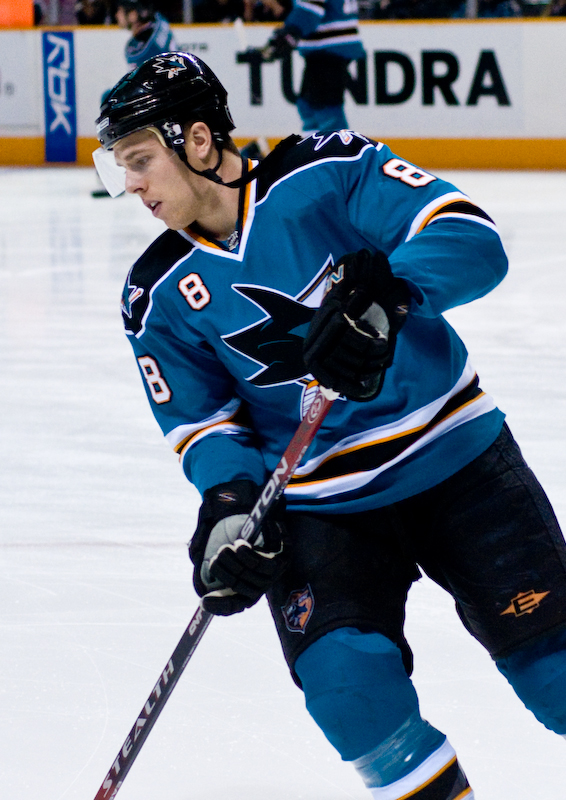
Pavelski during a game in the 2007–08 season.

During the 2007–08 season, Pavelski became a regular player on the Sharks roster and one of the best and most consistent young players on the squad, playing in all 82 regular season games and in all 13 2008 Stanley Cup playoff games. He also became one of the most effective players in the NHL during shootouts, scoring 7 times on 11 opportunities that season. During the 2008 playoffs, he was tied with Ryane Clowe for the team lead in goals (five) and tied for second with Clowe in points (nine). Pavelski also led San Jose with three game-winning goals during the playoffs, which tied for third most in the playoffs overall. In addition to his offensive numbers, he finished tied 12th among NHL forwards in blocked shots (59) during the regular season.

Pavelski had another solid season in 2008–09, playing in 80 games and recording 25 goals and 34 assists for 59 points, career-highs for all three statistics at the time.

During the 2010 playoffs, Pavelski had three-straight multi-goal games (Game 6 against the Colorado Avalanche and Games 1 and 2 against the Detroit Red Wings), not only helping the Sharks win all three games, but also becoming the first player to do so since Mario Lemieux in 1992. It was after this streak that he also picked up the nickname "The Big Pavelski" to accompany his nickname of "Little Joe".

Pavelski came close to scoring his first NHL hat-trick on March 19, 2011, against the St. Louis Blues. After the game, however, one of the goals was awarded to Patrick Marleau, when it had been originally attributed to Pavelski.

During the 2012–13 NHL lockout, Pavelski signed with Belarusian team Dinamo Minsk of the Kontinental Hockey League (KHL).

On July 30, 2013, the Sharks announced that Pavelski had signed a new five-year contract with the team effective from the 2014–15 season through to the 2018–19 season. On March 11, 2014, against the Toronto Maple Leafs, Pavelski scored his 400th career NHL point. During the season, Pavelski recorded a career-high 41 goals and 79 points.

During the 2014–15 season, Pavelski had another strong offensive season, scoring 70 points (37 goals and 33 assists) and was named one of the Sharks' four alternate captains.

On October 5, 2015, Pavelski was named the Sharks' ninth captain in history, over teammates (and former Sharks' captains) Joe Thornton and Patrick Marleau.

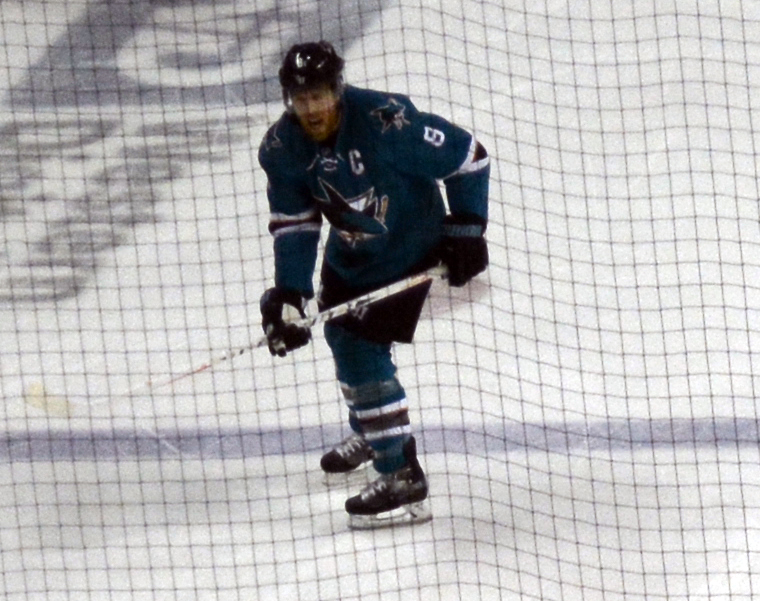
Pavelski in December 2016.

During the 2015–16 regular season, Pavelski tallied 78 points (38 goals and 40 assists) and he earned a spot in the 2016 NHL All-Star Game. He finished fifth in the NHL in goals with 38, sixth in points and first in game-winning goals with 11. Pavelski's success continued into the 2016 playoffs, as he led the Sharks into their first ever Stanley Cup Finals. Pavelski only scored one goal in the Finals, though he still finished as the playoff leader in goals (14) and finished third in points (23).

On December 1, 2017, Pavelski scored his 300th NHL goal on a pass from Joe Thornton against the Florida Panthers. He became only the second Sharks player to score 300 goals with the team, after Patrick Marleau.

On April 23, 2019, during the 2019 playoffs, Pavelski suffered a major head injury after a cross check from Vegas Golden Knights center Cody Eakin, followed immediately by an incidental collision with Vegas' Paul Stastny which knocked Pavelski awkwardly to the ice. Pavelski was helped off of the ice and did not return to the game. Eakin was charged with a five-minute major penalty and a ten-minute game misconduct, which enabled the Sharks to score four goals in five minutes and send the game to overtime. The Sharks later won the game 5–4 in overtime and advanced to the second round of the playoffs.

==== Dallas Stars (2019–2024) ====
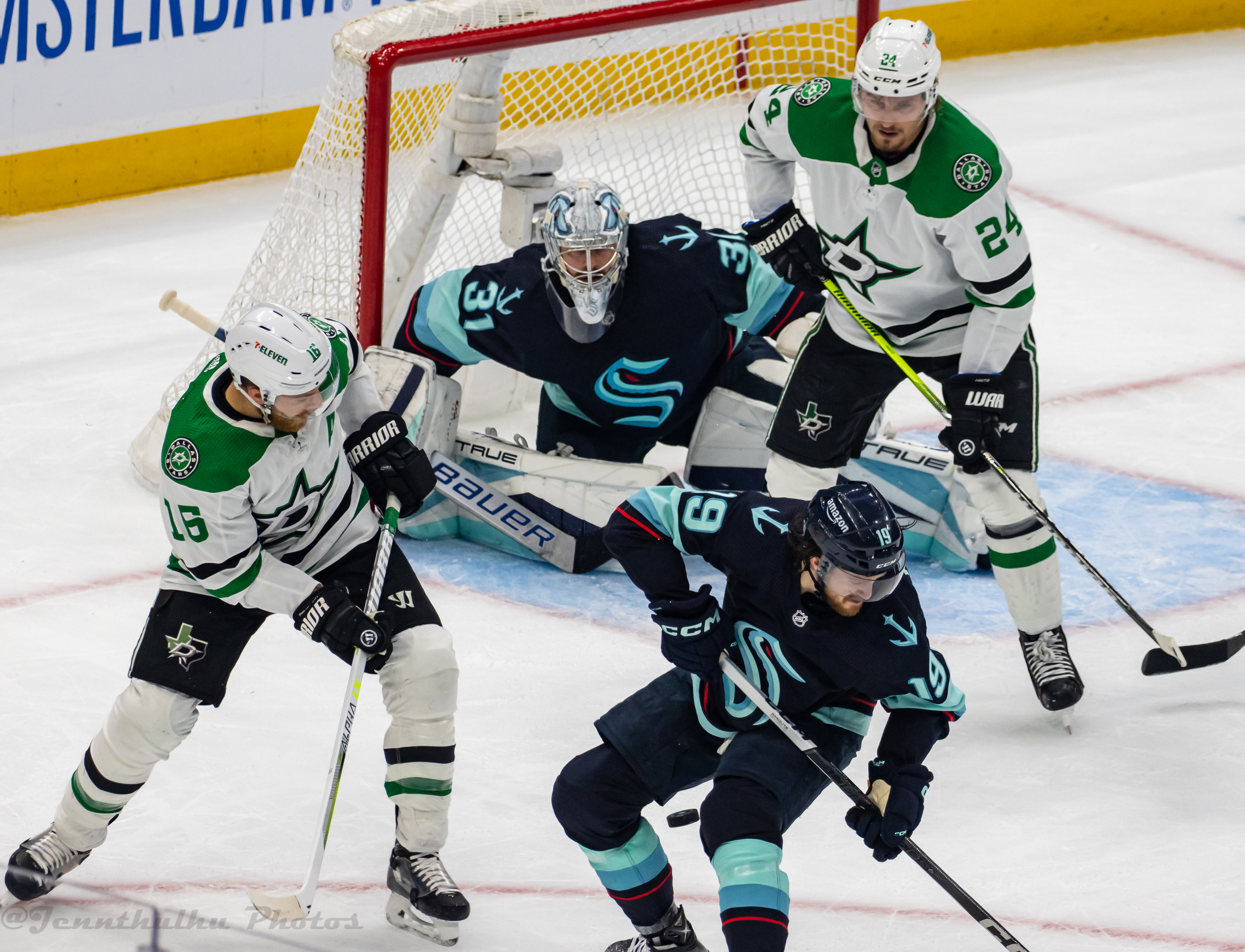
Pavelski (left) battles with Jared McCann of the Seattle Kraken during Round 2 Game 6 of the 2023 Stanley Cup playoffs.

On July 1, 2019, as an unrestricted free agent, Pavelski signed a three-year, $21 million contract with the Dallas Stars. On August 16, 2020, during the first round of the 2020 playoffs, Pavelski scored the first postseason hat-trick in Stars history since their relocation from Minnesota; Dino Ciccarelli (twice), Steve Payne and Bob Brooke had previously scored playoff hat-tricks for the North Stars. On September 26, 2020, in game 5 of the 2020 Stanley Cup Finals against the Tampa Bay Lightning, Pavelski scored his 61st playoff goal against Tampa Bay goaltender Andrei Vasilevskiy, surpassing Joe Mullen (who has 60 playoff goals) as the all-time playoff goal scorer by a United States-born player. Pavelski and the Stars would go on to lose the series 4-2.

Pavelski was named an alternate captain for the 2021–22 season and has played on the Stars' top-line, alongside young guns Roope Hintz and Jason Robertson. That top-line led the Stars in scoring, accounting for almost 44% of the Stars’ goals. Given the age difference between Pavelski and his linemates (12 and 15 years), the line became known as the "Pavelski and Sons" line in the Dallas sports media. On November 26, 2021, he scored his 400th NHL goal, making him the tenth American-born player to do so. On March 11, 2022, the Stars signed Pavelski to a one-year, $5.5 million contract. He would go on to enjoy a highly productive output during the 2021–22 season, scoring 27 goals with 54 assists for a career-best 81 points in the season in all 82 games played.

On January 1, 2023, the Stars signed Pavelski to a one-year, $3.5 million extension. Pavelski scored his 1,000th career point in a 6–1 win over the Detroit Red Wings with a goal on goaltender Ville Husso on April 10, 2023.

Following the Stars' elimination from the 2024 playoffs in early June, Pavelski initially indicated that he planned to retire, though he declined to do so officially. A month and a half later, on July 16, 2024, five days after his 40th birthday, Pavelski formally announced his retirement from professional hockey.

== International play ==
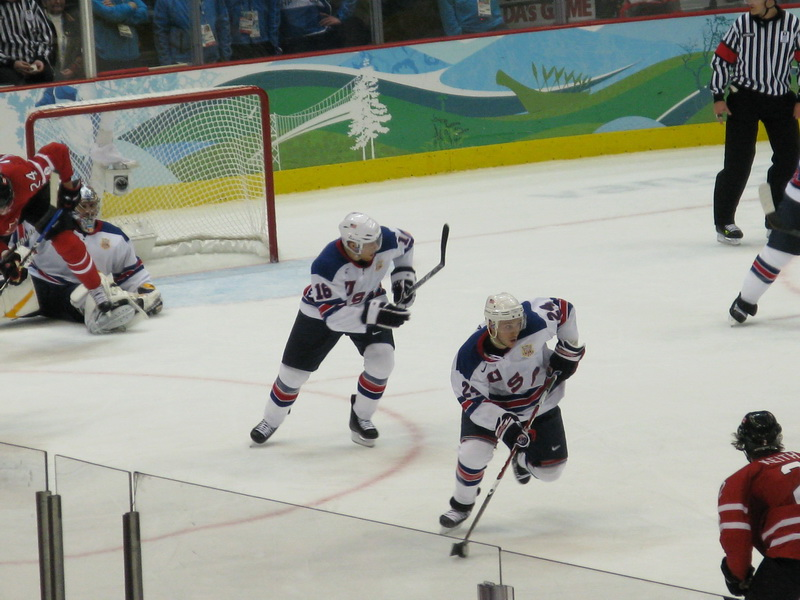
- Pavelski (#16) and Ryan Callahan (#24, with puck) move up ice against Canada during the 2010 Winter Olympics.

Medal record

Ice hockey

Representing United States

Olympic Games
| Silver medal – second place | 2010 Vancouver | Team |

On January 1, 2010, Pavelski was selected to the 2010 USA Olympic team, the only USA player from the San Jose Sharks. He had three assists in the team's silver medal effort and was second in faceoff percentage amongst all players in the tournament. In the waning seconds of regulation time in the gold medal game, Pavelski won a faceoff, swatted a clearing attempt out of the air, and made a pass that set up the play that resulted in the Americans tying the game with 24 seconds left. He was nicknamed "Swiss Army Knife" by USA general manager Brian Burke. On January 1, 2014, Pavelski was selected to the 2014 USA Olympic team, his second appearance. After being named captain of Team USA for the 2016 World Cup of Hockey, he also earned the nickname "Captain America".

== Personal life ==
Pavelski married his wife Sarah in 2008, and they have one son together. Since 2010, Pavelski has served as the co-owner of the Janesville Jets of the North American Hockey League (NAHL). In 2020, Pavelski and his wife co-opened a meal preparation company in Madison, Wisconsin, with two friends. As a retired player, Pavelski won the 2025 American Century Championship golf tournament, finishing with a score of 73.

== Career statistics ==
=== Regular season and playoffs ===
Bold indicates led league

| | | | Regular season | | | | | Playoffs |
| Season | Team | League | GP | G | A | Pts | PIM | GP | G | A | Pts | PIM |
|---|---|---|---|---|---|---|---|---|---|---|---|---|
| 2000–01 | Stevens Point Area Senior High School | HS-WI | — | — | — | — | — | — | — | — | — | — |
| 2001–02 | Stevens Point Area Senior High School | HS-WI | — | — | — | — | — | — | — | — | — | — |
| 2002–03 | Waterloo Black Hawks | USHL | 61 | 36 | 33 | 69 | 32 | 7 | 5 | 7 | 12 | 8 |
| 2003–04 | Waterloo Black Hawks | USHL | 52 | 21 | 31 | 52 | 58 | 10 | 5 | 4 | 9 | 10 |
| 2004–05 | University of Wisconsin | WCHA | 41 | 16 | 29 | 45 | 26 | — | — | — | — | — |
| 2005–06 | University of Wisconsin | WCHA | 43 | 23 | 33 | 56 | 34 | — | — | — | — | — |
| 2006–07 | Worcester Sharks | AHL | 16 | 8 | 18 | 26 | 8 | — | — | — | — | — |
| 2006–07 | San Jose Sharks | NHL | 46 | 14 | 14 | 28 | 18 | 6 | 1 | 0 | 1 | 0 |
| 2007–08 | San Jose Sharks | NHL | 82 | 19 | 21 | 40 | 28 | 13 | 5 | 4 | 9 | 0 |
| 2008–09 | San Jose Sharks | NHL | 80 | 25 | 34 | 59 | 46 | 6 | 0 | 1 | 1 | 9 |
| 2009–10 | San Jose Sharks | NHL | 67 | 25 | 26 | 51 | 26 | 15 | 9 | 8 | 17 | 6 |
| 2010–11 | San Jose Sharks | NHL | 74 | 20 | 46 | 66 | 24 | 18 | 5 | 5 | 10 | 10 |
| 2011–12 | San Jose Sharks | NHL | 82 | 31 | 30 | 61 | 31 | 5 | 0 | 0 | 0 | 5 |
| 2012–13 | Dinamo Minsk | KHL | 17 | 7 | 8 | 15 | 10 | — | — | — | — | — |
| 2012–13 | San Jose Sharks | NHL | 48 | 16 | 15 | 31 | 10 | 11 | 4 | 8 | 12 | 0 |
| 2013–14 | San Jose Sharks | NHL | 82 | 41 | 38 | 79 | 32 | 7 | 2 | 4 | 6 | 2 |
| 2014–15 | San Jose Sharks | NHL | 82 | 37 | 33 | 70 | 29 | — | — | — | — | — |
| 2015–16 | San Jose Sharks | NHL | 82 | 38 | 40 | 78 | 30 | 24 | **14** | 9 | 23 | 4 |
| 2016–17 | San Jose Sharks | NHL | 81 | 29 | 39 | 68 | 34 | 6 | 2 | 2 | 4 | 0 |
| 2017–18 | San Jose Sharks | NHL | 82 | 22 | 44 | 66 | 41 | 10 | 2 | 6 | 8 | 8 |
| 2018–19 | San Jose Sharks | NHL | 75 | 38 | 26 | 64 | 22 | 13 | 4 | 5 | 9 | 4 |
| 2019–20 | Dallas Stars | NHL | 67 | 14 | 17 | 31 | 29 | 27 | 13 | 6 | 19 | 30 |
| 2020–21 | Dallas Stars | NHL | 56 | 25 | 26 | 51 | 16 | — | — | — | — | — |
| 2021–22 | Dallas Stars | NHL | 82 | 27 | 54 | 81 | 14 | 7 | 3 | 3 | 6 | 2 |
| 2022–23 | Dallas Stars | NHL | 82 | 28 | 49 | 77 | 8 | 14 | 9 | 5 | 14 | 2 |
| 2023–24 | Dallas Stars | NHL | 82 | 27 | 40 | 67 | 20 | 19 | 1 | 3 | 4 | 2 |
| NHL totals | | | 1,332 | 476 | 592 | 1,068 | 458 | 201 | 74 | 69 | 143 | 84 |

=== International ===
| Year | Team | Event | Result | GP | G | A | Pts | PIM |
|---|---|---|---|---|---|---|---|---|
| 2009 | United States | WC | 4th | 5 | 1 | 1 | 2 | 0 |
| 2010 | United States | OG | 2nd place, silver medalist(s) | 6 | 0 | 3 | 3 | 4 |
| 2014 | United States | OG | 4th | 6 | 1 | 4 | 5 | 0 |
| 2016 | United States | WCH | 7th | 3 | 1 | 1 | 2 | 0 |
| Senior totals | | | | 20 | 3 | 9 | 12 | 4 |

== Awards and honors ==
| Award | Year |
College
| All-WCHA Rookie Team | 2004–05 |
| All-WCHA Second team | 2005–06 |
| AHCA West second-team All-American | 2005–06 |
| NCAA National Champion | 2006 |
| University of Wisconsin Athletics Hall of Fame | 2025 |
NHL
| Second All-Star team | 2014 |
| NHL All-Star | 2016, 2017, 2019, 2022 |
| San Jose Sharks | |
| Sharks Fan Favorite Award | 2014, 2015 |
| Sharks Player of the Year | 2014, 2015 |
| Three Stars of the Year | 2012, 2016 |

=== Records ===
- Most playoff goals by an American-born player – 74

Sporting positions
| Preceded by Joe Thornton | San Jose Sharks captain 2015–2019 | Succeeded by Logan Couture |
