= Danny Irmen =

American ice hockey player (born 1984)

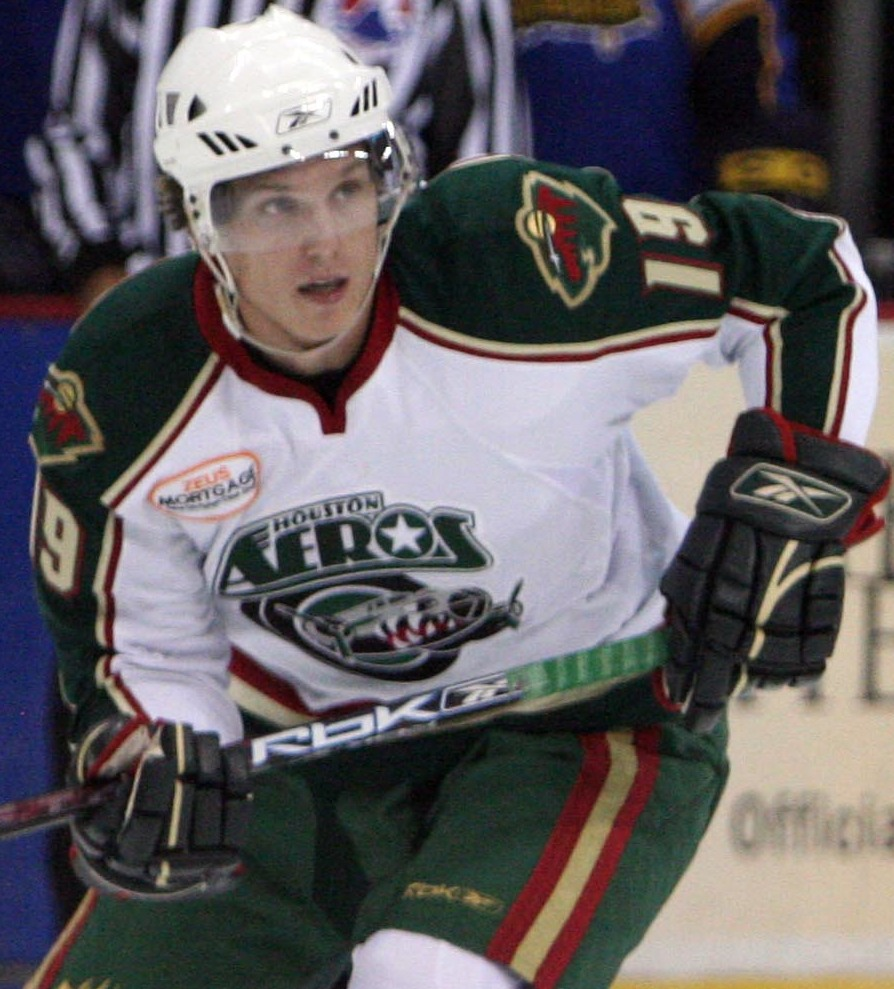
- Irmen with the Houston Aeros in 2007
- Born: September 6, 1984 (age 41) Fargo, North Dakota, U.S.
- Height: 6 ft 0 in (183 cm)
- Weight: 190 lb (86 kg; 13 st 8 lb)
- Position: Right wing
- Shot: Right
- Played for: Minnesota Wild; HC Bolzano; EHC Black Wings Linz; HC Lugano; ERC Ingolstadt
- NHL draft: 78th overall, 2003; Minnesota Wild
- Playing career: 2006–2017

Danny Irmen (born September 6, 1984, in Fargo, North Dakota) is a retired American professional ice hockey right winger. He most recently played for ERC Ingolstadt of the Deutsche Eishockey Liga (DEL). Irmen was drafted 78th overall by the Minnesota Wild in the 2003 NHL entry draft, and played his only two NHL games with them.

== Playing career ==
Irmen was drafted after playing two seasons in the United States Hockey League with the Lincoln Stars He played collegiate hockey with the University of Minnesota in the Western Collegiate Hockey Association. At the conclusion of his junior year, the North Dakota native made his professional debut with the Wild's American Hockey League affiliate, the Houston Aeros at the tail end of the 2005–06 season.

After signing an entry-level contract with the Minnesota Wild, Irmen was reassigned to the Aeros on a full-time basis. Irmen made his long-awaited NHL debut in his fifth year within the Wild organization, appearing in two games in the 2009–10 season.

As a free agent from the Wild, Irmen decided to pursue a European career, signing with Italian club, HC Bolzano of then the Serie A on October 12, 2010.

Irmen followed with stints in Austria and Switzerland before signing a one-year contract with German club, ERC Ingolstadt of the DEL on May 26, 2015. He would spend two seasons with them before retiring from professional hockey.

== Career statistics ==
			Regular season					Playoffs
Season	Team	League	GP	G	A	Pts	PIM	GP	G	A	Pts	PIM
1998–99	North High School	HSND
1999–2000	Red River High School	HSND
2000–01	Red River High School	HSND
2001–02	Lincoln Stars	USHL	61	17	36	53	34	4	0	1	1	4
2002–03	Lincoln Stars	USHL	45	21	34	55	78	10	8	6	14	17
2003–04	University of Minnesota	WCHA	44	14	8	22	40	—	—	—	—	—
2004–05	University of Minnesota	WCHA	43	24	19	43	62	—	—	—	—	—
2005–06	University of Minnesota	WCHA	30	16	22	38	40	—	—	—	—	—
2005–06	Houston Aeros	AHL	4	0	2	2	0	7	0	0	0	4
2006–07	Houston Aeros	AHL	80	17	20	37	45	—	—	—	—	—
2007–08	Houston Aeros	AHL	77	10	13	23	51	5	0	1	1	0
2008–09	Houston Aeros	AHL	69	7	11	18	39	20	2	0	2	8
2009–10	Houston Aeros	AHL	74	13	17	30	52	—	—	—	—	—
2009–10	Minnesota Wild	NHL	2	0	0	0	0	—	—	—	—	—
2010–11	HC Bolzano	ITA	32	16	18	34	22	11	6	6	12	8
2011–12	EHC Liwest Black Wings Linz	AUT	48	25	21	46	75	17	7	6	13	8
2012–13	EHC Liwest Black Wings Linz	AUT	49	17	25	42	18	13	3	10	13	6
2013–14	HC Thurgau	SUI.2	45	21	31	52	38	4	1	0	1	2
2013–14	HC Lugano	NLA	—	—	—	—	—	4	1	1	2	6
2014–15	HC Thurgau	SUI.2	35	10	20	30	14	2	0	1	1	0
2015–16	ERC Ingolstadt	DEL	47	7	9	16	24	2	0	0	0	0
2016–17	ERC Ingolstadt	DEL	52	19	18	37	32	2	0	0	0	16
AHL totals			304	47	63	110	187	32	2	1	3	12
NHL totals			2	0	0	0	0	—	—	—	—	—
DEL totals			99	26	27	53	56	4	0	0	0	16

== Awards and honors ==
Award	Year
USHL
Playoff MVP	2003
Clark Cup (Lincoln Stars)	2003
College
WCHA All-Tournament Team	2004
All-WCHA Third Team	2005, 2006
