= Phil Giubileo =

American professional sports broadcaster

Phil Giubileo is an American professional sports broadcaster. Giubileo grew up in the Bronx, New York and attended Fordham University, where he graduated with a B.S. in Management Sciences.

Giubileo is the lead play-by-play broadcaster for Quinnipiac University hockey (men's and women's) on ESPN+. He also is the lead announcer for Spice City FC in the 2nd division (M2) of the Major_Arena_Soccer_League. He also broadcasts college rugby, soccer, and lacrosse locally at the Division I level in Connecticut.

Previously, Giubileo was the main broadcaster for the Bridgeport Sound Tigers of the American Hockey League (AHL) from 2006-2015. The Sound Tigers are the top minor league affiliate of the New York Islanders (NHL). He also served as the host for AHL Live's Around The AHL, a review of the previous week's action, and was a voiceover talent for the NHL's Arena Highlights program for several years. Giubileo also appeared on occasion as a reporter on NY Islanders telecasts on MSG Plus, where he featured players from the Sound Tigers. He was also the play-by-play announcer for the now defunct Connecticut Whale in the PHF, where he also handled the call of the Isobel Cup Final in 2016, 2017, and 2018.

Giubileo was the play-by-play announcer for AHL Live's global broadband webcast of the 2009 AHL All-Star Classic, which was played at DCU Center in Worcester, Massachusetts. He also anchored the live coverage of the 2009 AHL Hall-of Fame Induction ceremony. He was joined on the broadcast by Owen Newkirk, who is the current radio host for the Dallas Stars. He also served as the play-by-play announcer for the opening round of the 2009-2012 Women's Big East Basketball Championship, which was broadcast exclusively online at bigeast.tv

Previously Giubileo broadcast hockey for the now defunct Danbury Trashers (UHL) and was featured in the Netflix documentary series Untold, where he was part of the episode Crime and Penalties, directed by Maclain Way & Chapman Way, the duo behind the Emmy award winning Wild Wild Country.

He also broadcast for the St. Louis Heartland Eagles (USHL) and baseball for the River City Rascals (Frontier League). He worked as a voiceover artist for Neulion for an NHL highlights program that was broadcast in league arena's around the U.S. and Canada.

Giubileo started his career while in college at WFUV, a National Public Radio (NPR) affiliate licensed to Fordham University. He began as a staff member in 1991 and progressed to the title of Sports Director from 1993 to 1995. While at WFUV, Giubileo was one of the hosts of One on One, which is New York City's longest-running sports call-in show, and handled play-by-play for Fordham basketball, football, and baseball.

For three years Giubileo studied play-by-play under legendary sportscaster Marty Glickman.

Following his career at WFUV, Giubileo served as a studio producer for WABC Radio, working on various sports and talk programming including New Jersey Devils (NHL) hockey and New York Yankees (MLB) baseball broadcasts. Giubileo also worked for talk show hosts Sean Hannity, Curtis Sliwa, and Lynn Samuels.

In 2004, Giubileo broadcast the Frontier League All-Star Game for Fox Sports Networks. In 2008, he served as the voice over talent for several episodes of the documentary series Day In The Life, which was televised on NHL Network.
