= Igor Bobček =

Slovak ice hockey player

- Born: 6 October 1983 (age 43) Myjava, Czechoslovakia
- Height: 6 ft 3 in (191 cm)
- Weight: 203 lb (92 kg; 14 st 7 lb)
- Position: Defence
- Shoots: Left
- Erste Liga team Former teams: CS Progym Gheorgheni; Podhale Nowy Targ; VHK Vsetín; HK Dukla Trenčín; HK Nitra; MsHK Žilina; MHC Martin; SG Cortina; GKS Tychy; DVTK Jegesmedvék; HK 36 Skalica; HC Astana; Manchester Storm; Coventry Blaze; MHk 32 Liptovský Mikuláš
- NHL draft: Undrafted
- Playing career: 2003–present

Igor Bobček (born 6 October 1983) is a Slovak ice hockey defenceman who plays for CS Progym Gheorgheni in the Erste Liga and the Romanian Hockey League.

Bobček was born in Myjava. Before turning professional, he played the 2002–03 season with the Waterloo Black Hawks of the United States Hockey League.

After playing with several clubs outside Slovakia, including GKS Tychy of the Polska Liga Hokejowa, he returned to HK 36 Skalica in December 2012.
