= 2001–02 USHL season =

- League: United States Hockey League
- Sport: Ice hockey
- Duration: Regular season September 2001 – March 2002; Postseason; April 10 – May 12, 2002
- Games: 61, 13
- Teams: 14

Regular season
- Anderson Cup: Omaha Lancers

Clark Cup Playoffs
- Finals champions: Sioux City Musketeers
- Runners-up: Omaha Lancers

USHL seasons
- ← 2000–01 2002–03 →

The 2001–02 USHL season was the 23rd season of the United States Hockey League as an all-junior league. The regular season began in September 2001 and concluded in March 2002. The Omaha Lancers won the Anderson Cup as regular season champions. The Sioux City Musketeers defeated the Omaha Lancers 3 games to 2 for the Clark Cup.

== Member changes ==
- After the dissolution of the Topeka ScareCrows, a minor professional team, in 2001, the franchise's owners were approved to found an expansion team in the USHL. The team began play this season.
- The Dubuque Fighting Saints relocated and became the Tulsa Crude.

== Regular season ==
Final standings

Note: GP = Games played; W = Wins; L = Losses; OTL = Overtime losses; GF = Goals for; GA = Goals against; PTS = Points; x = clinched playoff berth; y = clinched division title; z = clinched league title

=== Eastern Conference ===
Team	GP	W	L	OTL	Pts	GF	GA
xy – Green Bay Gamblers	61	35	20	6	76	184	179
x – Cedar Rapids RoughRiders	61	33	21	7	73	188	161
x – Des Moines Buccaneers	61	32	24	5	69	222	202
x – Chicago Steel	61	29	24	8	66	191	209
Waterloo Black Hawks	61	21	38	2	44	138	220
Rochester Mustangs	61	17	39	5	39	145	226

=== Western Conference ===
Team	GP	W	L	OTL	Pts	GF	GA
xyz – Omaha Lancers	61	46	12	3	95	215	111
x – Lincoln Stars	61	43	15	3	89	240	157
x – Sioux City Musketeers	61	41	16	4	86	237	162
x – Sioux Falls Stampede	61	35	21	5	75	252	217
Tri-City Storm	61	27	30	4	58	181	208
Topeka ScareCrows	61	25	30	6	56	198	225
Tulsa Crude	61	12	43	6	30	121	237

=== USNTDP ===
Team	GP	W	L	OTL	Pts	GF	GA
USNTDP	13	7	5	1	15	35	34

Note: The USNTDP played one game against each of the full league members.

=== Statistics ===
==== Scoring leaders ====
The following players led the league in regular season points at the completion of all regular season games.

Player	Team	GP	G	A	Pts	PIM
Thomas Vanek	Sioux Falls Stampede	53	46	45	91	54
Vince Bellissimo	Topeka ScareCrows	61	37	39	76	33
Eric Przepiorka	Sioux Falls Stampede	61	43	29	72	118
Brad Zancanaro	Sioux City Musketeers	50	26	45	71	69
Brandon Schwartz	Sioux City Musketeers	57	30	35	65	52
Chris Collins	Des Moines Buccaneers	60	26	39	65	112
Alexander Materukhin	Des Moines Buccaneers	59	37	26	63	154
Matt Ciancio	Sioux City Musketeers	48	26	36	62	86
Aaron Slattengren	Omaha Lancers	52	19	42	61	58
Tim Stapleton	Green Bay Gamblers	61	24	36	60	10

==== Leading goaltenders ====
Note: GP = Games played; Mins = Minutes played; W = Wins; L = Losses; OTL = Overtime losses; SO = Shutouts; GAA = Goals against average; SV% = Save percentage

Player	Team	GP	Mins	W	L	OTL	SO	GA	SV	SV%	GAA
Marty Magers	Omaha Lancers	30	1780	21	6	2	10	48	608	.927	1.62
Dominic Vicari	Omaha Lancers	33	1890	25	6	1	7	56	700	.926	1.78
Bobby Goepfert	Cedar Rapids RoughRiders	51	2918	27	16	5	8	99	1,446	.936	2.04
Jean-Philippe Lamoureux	Lincoln Stars	31	1758	20	8	1	6	66	728	.917	2.25
Nate Ziegelmann	Lincoln Stars	26	1490	20	4	1	4	62	601	.906	2.50
Andy Franck	Sioux City Musketeers	38	2135	25	10	1	3	89	1,022	.920	2.50

== Clark Cup playoffs ==
The regular season division champions received the top two seeds.
All teams were reseeded after the quarterfinal round.

Quarterfinal (Best-of-5)
W1	Omaha Lancers	4	3	3	3	-
8	Chicago Steel	2	1	4*	0	-
E1	Green Bay Gamblers	5	5	6*	-	-
7	Des Moines Buccaneers	2	3	5	-	-
3	Lincoln Stars	3	3	3*	0	-
6	Cedar Rapids RoughRiders	4*	4*	2	2	-
4	Sioux City Musketeers	7	1	3	-	-
5	Sioux Falls Stampede	1	0	2	-	-

Semifinal (Best-of-5)
W1	Omaha Lancers	1	5	3	2	-
6	Cedar Rapids RoughRiders	0	1	4	0	-
E1	Green Bay Gamblers	4	1	3	4	-
4	Sioux City Musketeers	1	4	7	6	-

Championship (Best-of-5)
W1	Omaha Lancers	6	3	1	2	3
4	Sioux City Musketeers	1	4	3	1	4*

Note: * denotes overtime period(s)

== Awards ==
Award	Recipient	Team
Player of the Year	Bobby Goepfert	Cedar Rapids RoughRiders
Forward of the Year	Vince Bellissimo	Topeka Scarecrows
Defenseman of the Year	Brett Skinner	Des Moines Buccaneers
Goaltender of the Year	Bobby Goepfert	Cedar Rapids RoughRiders
Rookie of the Year	Danny Richmond	Chicago Steel
Coach of the Year	Mike Hastings	Omaha Lancers
General Manager of the Year	Mike Hastings	Omaha Lancers
