= Dominic Vicari =

American ice hockey player

- Born: October 30, 1984 (age 41) Clinton Township, Michigan, U.S.
- Height: 5 ft 10 in (178 cm)
- Weight: 180 lb (82 kg; 12 st 12 lb)
- Position: Goaltender
- Caught: Left
- Played for: NCAA; Michigan State University; AHL; Grand Rapids Griffins; ECHL; Toledo Storm
- NHL draft: Undrafted
- Playing career: 2006–2007

Dominic Vicari (born October 30, 1984) is an American former professional ice hockey goaltender.

Prior to turning professional, Vicari attended Michigan State University (MSU) where he played three seasons (2003 – 2006) of NCAA Men's Division I Ice Hockey with the Michigan State Spartans. In his freshman year, Vicari was recognized for his outstanding college hockey play when he was named to the 2003–04 CCHA All-Rookie First Team, and was also selected the CCHA Goaltender of the Year.

Forgoing his final year of NCAA eligibility, Vicari signed with the Toledo Storm to play the 2006–07 season in the ECHL. On January 23, 2007, Vicari was signed to professional tryout contract by Grand Rapids Griffins, but played in just one game with the American Hockey League team.

== Awards and honors ==
Award	Year
USA Hockey Dave Peterson Goalie of the Year	2002–03
USHL First Team All-Star	2002–03
USHL Goaltender of the Year	2002–03
CCHA All-Rookie First Team	2003–04
CCHA Goaltender of the Year	2003–04
IIHF World U20 Championship Gold Medal with Team USA	2004

Awards and achievements
Preceded by Mike Betz	CCHA Goaltender of the Year; 2003-04	Succeeded by Tuomas Tarkki
