= Tomáš Jasko =

Slovak ice hockey player

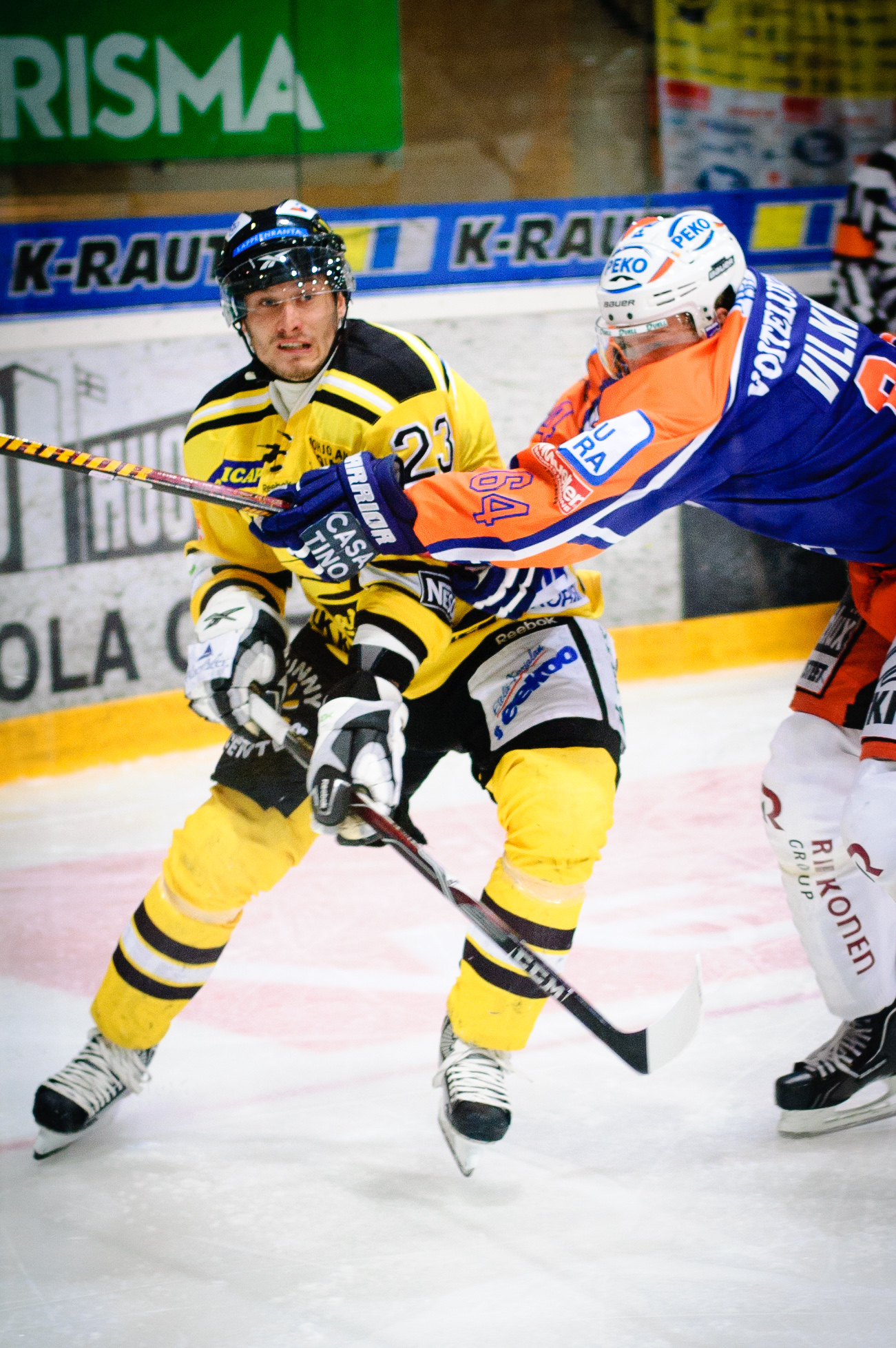
- Jaško (left) with SaiPa in 2010
- Born: December 9, 1983 (age 41); Bratislava, Czechoslovakia
- Height: 6 ft 0 in (183 cm)
- Weight: 181 lb (82 kg; 12 st 13 lb)
- Position: Forward
- Shot: Left
- KVL team: HC Saryarka
- Played for: HC Slovan Bratislava; VEU Feldkirch; HK 36 Skalica; HKm Zvolen; MHC Martin; LeKi; Kiekko-Vantaa; SaiPa; HK SKP Poprad; Mikkelin Jukurit; Saryarka Karagandy; Arystan Temirtau
- Playing career: 2003–2019

Tomáš Jasko (born December 9, 1983) is a Slovak former professional ice hockey player.

Jasko played in the Slovak Extraliga with HC Slovan Bratislava, HK 36 Skalica, HKm Zvolen, MHC Martin and HK Poprad. He also played 95 games for SaiPa in the Finnish SM-liiga.
