= 2003–04 USHL season =

2003-04 USHL season
- League: United States Hockey League
- Sport: Ice hockey
- Duration: September 28, 2003 – May 5, 2004
- Games: 60
- Teams: 12

Regular season
- Season champions: Tri-City Storm
- Season MVP: Joe Pavelski (Waterloo Black Hawks)
- Top scorer: Mike Howe (River City Lancers)

Clark Cup Playoffs
- Clark Cup Playoffs MVP: Kevin Regan (Black Hawks)
- Finals champions: Waterloo Black Hawks
- Runners-up: Tri-City Storm

USHL seasons
- 2002–03 2004–05

The 2003–04 USHL season is the 25th season of the United States Hockey League as an all-junior league. The regular season began on September 26, 2003, and concluded on March 28, 2004, with the regular season champion winning the Anderson Cup. The 2003–04 season was the first for the Danville Wings after transferring from the North American Hockey League and the only season for the St. Louis Heartland Eagles after moving from Topeka, Kansas. At the conclusion of the season, St. Louis voluntarily suspended operations and officially folded a year later.

The Clark Cup playoffs features the top four teams from each division competing for the league title.

== Regular season ==
Final standings

Note: GP = Games played; W = Wins; L = Losses; OTL = Overtime losses; SL = Shootout losses; GF = Goals for; GA = Goals against; PTS = Points; x = clinched playoff berth; y = clinched division title; z = clinched league title

=== East Division ===
Team	GP	W	L	OTL	PTS	GF	GA
yChicago Steel	60	34	22	4	72	190	165
xCedar Rapids RoughRiders	60	34	23	3	71	207	188
xDanville Wings	60	29	23	8	66	171	178
xWaterloo Black Hawks	60	30	27	3	63	174	162
Green Bay Gamblers	60	27	28	5	59	171	176
St. Louis Heartland Eagles	60	17	37	6	40	135	229

=== West Division ===
Team	GP	W	L	OTL	PTS	GF	GA
zTri-City Storm	60	43	12	5	91	225	138
xSioux City Musketeers	60	38	15	7	83	192	152
xRiver City Lancers	60	37	16	7	81	202	160
xDes Moines Buccaneers	60	29	26	5	63	202	200
Lincoln Stars	60	27	29	4	58	174	191
Sioux Falls Stampede	60	15	42	3	33	148	252

== Clark Cup playoffs ==
Quarter-finals
1	Chicago	3	1	2	1	0
4	Waterloo	2	2	1	4	1
East Division
2	Cedar Rapids	3	0	2	1	–
3	Danville	1	2	3	4	–
1	Tri-City	4	5	6	–	–
4	Des Moines	3	2	1	–	–
West Division
2	Sioux City	3	5	4	–	–
3	River City	1	4	3	–	–

Semi-finals
4	Waterloo	3	6	9	–	–
3	Danville	2	1	1	–	–
1	Tri-City	3	5	1	2	–
2	Sioux City	2	2	2	0	–

Clark Cup Championship
E	Waterloo	3	4	3	2	–
W	Tri-City	2	1	4	1	–

== Players ==
=== Scoring leaders ===
	Player	Team	GP	G	A	Pts	+/-	PIM
1	Mike Howe	River City Lancers	56	36	42	78	+27	30
2	Paul Stastny	River City Lancers	56	30	47	77	+26	46
3	Bill Thomas	Tri-City Storm	60	31	38	69	+43	30
4	Matthew Ford	Sioux Falls Stampede	60	37	31	68	-4	60
5	Jim McKenzie	Sioux Falls Stampede	59	26	38	64	+13	168
	Mick Lawrence	River City Lancers	58	26	38	64	+11	127
7	Bryan Marshall	Danville Wings	60	28	35	63	+1	52
8	Mike Erickson	Des Moines Buccaneers	58	37	24	61	+5	23
9	Joel Hanson	Waterloo Black Hawks	60	17	42	59	+3	85
10	Danny Charleston	Chicago Steel	59	24	34	58	+7	92

=== Leading goaltenders ===
	Player	Team	GP	MIN	W	L	OTL	SO	GA	GAA	SV	SV%
1	Peter Mannino	Tri-City Storm	38	1987	26	7	0	5	70	2.11	687	.908
2	Jeff Lerg	River City Lancers	35	1962	24	5	2	4	72	2.20	800	.917
3	Eric Aarnio	Tri-City Storm	30	1638	17	5	2	1	61	2.23	601	.908
4	Jimmy Spratt	Sioux City Musketeers	34	1922	19	6	5	3	75	2.34	835	.918
5	Jeff Lantz	Sioux City Musketeers	33	1737	19	9	2	2	68	2.35	779	.920

== Awards ==
- Coach of the Year: Wil Nichol Chicago Steel
- Curt Hammer Award: Topher Scott Chicago Steel
- Defenseman of the Year: Mike Hodgson Sioux City Musketeers
- Forward of the Year: Mike Howe River City Lancers
- General Manager of the Year: Bliss Litter Tri-City Storm
- Goaltender of the Year: Phil Lamoureux Lincoln Stars
- Organization of the Year: Tri-City Storm
- Player of the Year: Mike Howe River City Lancers
- Rookie of the Year: Matthew Ford Sioux Falls Stampede
