= Jerry Sullivan (ice hockey) =

Canadian ice hockey player

- Born: February 19, 1937 (age 89) Noranda, Quebec, Canada
- Height: 5 ft 7 in (170 cm)
- Weight: 165 lb (75 kg; 11 st 11 lb)
- Position: Center
- Played for: Michigan Tech; Green Bay Bobcats; HIFK; Marquette Iron Rangers
- Playing career: 1959–1966

Gerald B. "Jerry" Sullivan is a Canadian retired ice hockey Center and coach who was an All-American and helped Michigan Tech win its first National Championship in 1962.

== Career ==
Sullivan played four years of junior hockey for the Hamilton Tiger Cubs, finishing in the top three for team scoring in each season. After helping the club reach its best finish in 1958, Sullivan was recruited by John MacInnes and arrived in Houghton in the fall. After a year with the freshman team, Sullivan provided depth scoring for Michigan Tech as the team progressed all the way to the 1960 national championship but were stymied by Denver. While the team as a whole had a down year in 1961, Sullivan increased his scoring production, leading the team and setting up the Huskies for a huge year.

The 1961–62 season began poorly for MTU with the Huskies dropping their first two games. After that, however, the team bore down and nearly ran the table, winning 29 of their succeeding 30 games. Team captain Sullivan led the squad in both goals (30) and points (59), and was named to both the All-WCHA First Team and West All-American team. After helping Michigan Tech win the first singular WCHA tournament championship, Sullivan led the huskies to dominating wins over St. Lawrence and Clarkson to capture the program's first national championship. Sullivan scored four points in the title game and was named to the All-Tournament Second Team.

After graduating, Sullivan continued his playing career, playing a year with the Green Bay Bobcats before travelling to Finland and playing with HIFK for two years. He returned to the Bobcats in 1965 and returned to the Iron Range two years later as a player for the Marquette Iron Rangers. Sullivan stayed with Marquette for six seasons before retiring in 1973. In 1975 he made his head coaching debut with Marquette Senior High School and led the team for the next 19 years. In his time with the Redmen, Sullivan won two state championships (1977 and 1988) and finished as runner-up twice. He finished his career with a record of 312–158–13 (.659) and was inducted into the Upper Peninsula Sports Hall of Fame in 1998. He had previously been enshrined in the Michigan Tech Sports Hall of Fame in 1986.

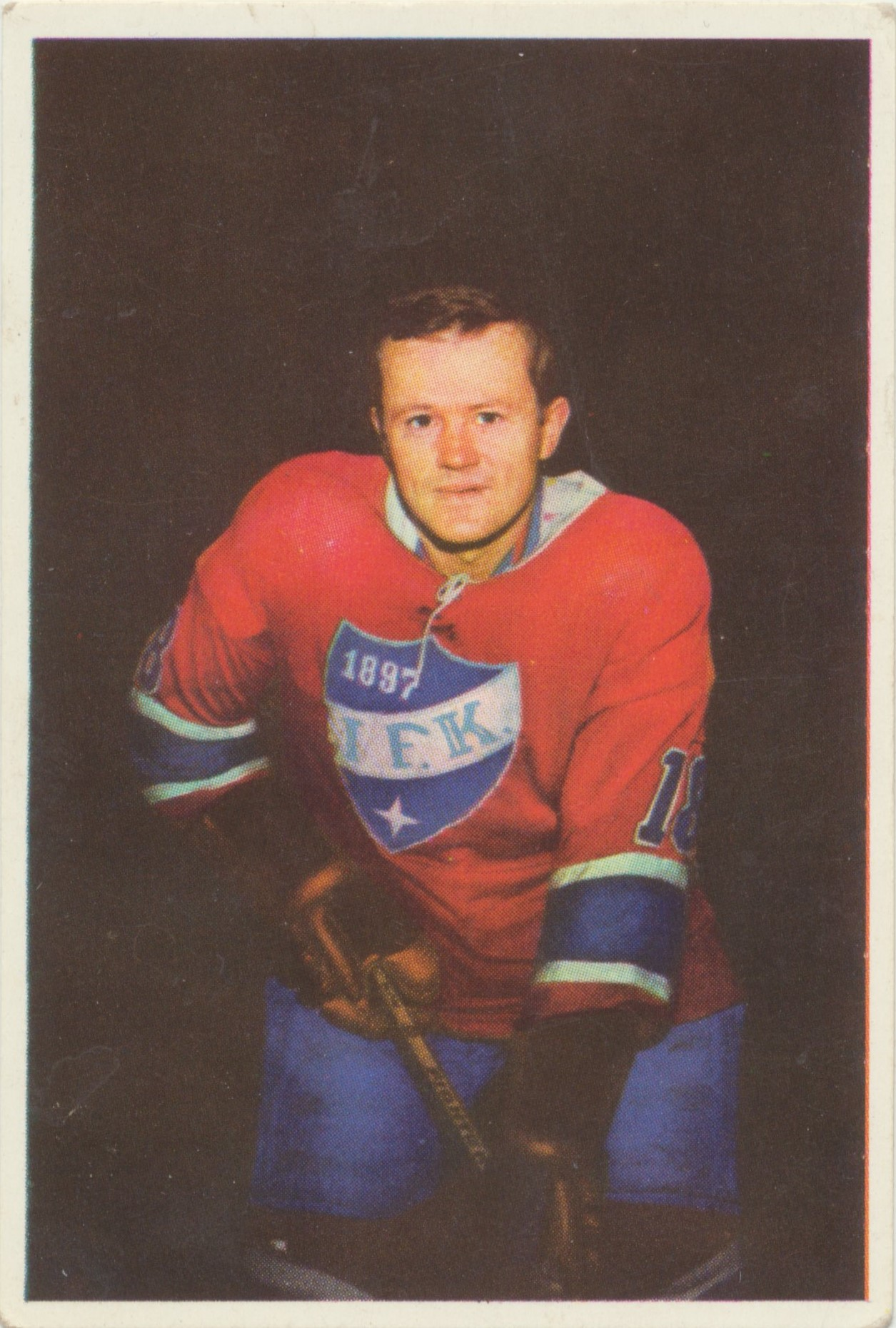
Jerry Sullivan 1963 (Hellas jenkki bubble gum series), pic 1 of 2

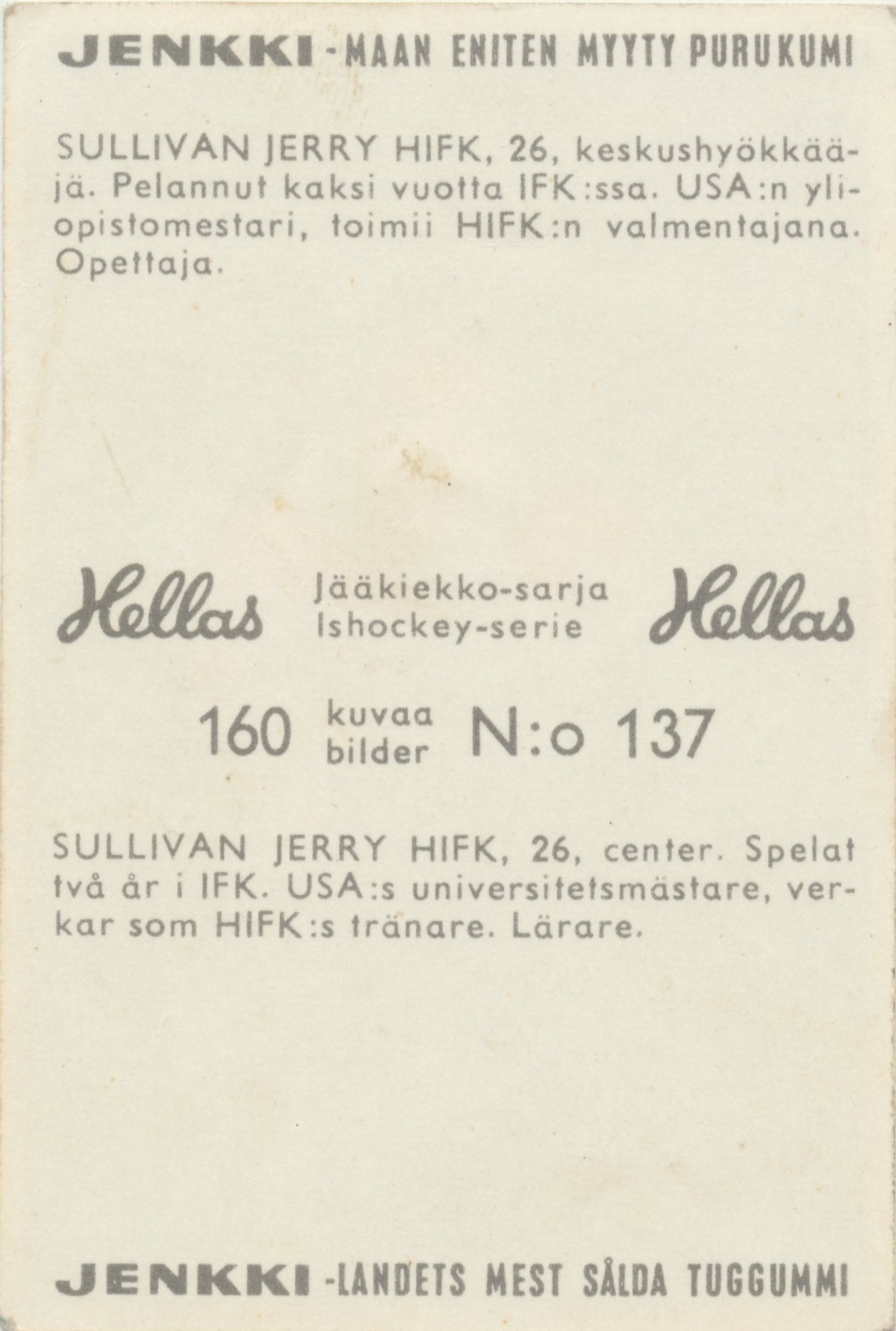
Jerry Sullivan 1963 (Hellas jenkki bubble gum series), pic 2 of 2, backside of the card

== Career statistics ==
=== Regular season and playoffs ===
| | | | Regular Season | | | | | Playoffs |
| Season | Team | League | GP | G | A | Pts | PIM | GP | G | A | Pts | PIM |
|---|---|---|---|---|---|---|---|---|---|---|---|---|
| 1954–55 | Hamilton Tiger Cubs | OHA | 49 | 16 | 28 | 44 | 0 | — | — | — | — | — |
| 1955–56 | Hamilton Tiger Cubs | OHA | 48 | 19 | 36 | 55 | 0 | — | — | — | — | — |
| 1956–57 | Hamilton Tiger Cubs | OHA | 52 | 21 | 21 | 42 | 0 | — | — | — | — | — |
| 1957–58 | Hamilton Tiger Cubs | OHA | 52 | 33 | 34 | 67 | 0 | — | — | — | — | — |
| 1959–60 | Michigan Tech | WCHA | 32 | 13 | 23 | 36 | 2 | — | — | — | — | — |
| 1960–61 | Michigan Tech | WCHA | 29 | 22 | 25 | 47 | 0 | — | — | — | — | — |
| 1961–62 | Michigan Tech | WCHA | 32 | 30 | 29 | 59 | 6 | — | — | — | — | — |
| 1962–63 | Green Bay Bobcats | USHL | — | 27 | 29 | 56 | 16 | — | — | — | — | — |
| 1963–64 | HIFK | Qualification | — | — | — | — | — | 6 | 3 | 4 | 7 | 2 |
| 1964–65 | HIFK | SM-sarja | 18 | 20 | 5 | 25 | 8 | — | — | — | — | — |
| 1965–66 | Green Bay Bobcats | USHL | 28 | 17 | 27 | 44 | 0 | — | — | — | — | — |
| 1966–67 | Green Bay Bobcats | USHL | 16 | 9 | 15 | 24 | 8 | — | — | — | — | — |
| 1967–68 | Marquette Iron Rangers | USHL | — | 32 | 33 | 65 | 6 | — | — | — | — | — |
| 1968–69 | Marquette Iron Rangers | USHL | — | — | — | — | — | — | — | — | — | — |
| 1969–70 | Marquette Iron Rangers | USHL | — | 21 | 28 | 49 | 6 | — | — | — | — | — |
| 1970–71 | Marquette Iron Rangers | USHL | — | 36 | 39 | 75 | 12 | — | — | — | — | — |
| 1971–72 | Marquette Iron Rangers | USHL | — | 27 | 25 | 52 | 12 | — | — | — | — | — |
| 1972–73 | Marquette Iron Rangers | USHL | 41 | 31 | 26 | 57 | 8 | — | — | — | — | — |
| OHA Totals | | | 201 | 89 | 119 | 208 | — | — | — | — | — | — |
| NCAA Totals | | | 93 | 65 | 77 | 142 | 8 | — | — | — | — | — |

== Awards and honors ==
| Award | Year |
|---|---|
| All-WCHA Second Team | 1960–61 |
| All-WCHA First Team | 1961–62 |
| AHCA West All-American | 1961–62 |
| NCAA All-Tournament Second Team | 1962 |
