= Carl Lackey =

American ice hockey player

- Born: October 16, 1942 (age 84) Sault Ste. Marie, Michigan, USA
- Height: 5 ft 11 in (180 cm)
- Weight: 170 lb (77 kg; 12 st 2 lb)
- Position: Defenseman
- Played for: Michigan State; Toledo Blades; Marquette Iron Rangers; Green Bay Bobcats
- National team: United States
- NHL draft: Undrafted
- Playing career: 1961–1974

Carl Lackey is an American ice hockey coach and former defenseman who was an All-American for Michigan State

== Career ==
Lackey was captain of the Sault team that won the state ice hockey championship and national junior championship in 1957. He began attending Michigan State University in the fall of 1960 and joined the varsity squad the following year. The Spartans weren't very good during Lackey's three years, finishing 4th, 5th and 7th (last) in the WCHA. Lackey, however, was one of the few bright spots on the team and was named team captain for his senior season. Despite MSU winning just 1 of 14 league games that year, Lackey was named to the All-WCHA Second Team and was selected as an All-American.

After graduating, he played a year of professional hockey with the Toledo Blades and then spent almost a decade playing senior hockey in the USHL. He played for the US national team at the 1969 Ice Hockey World Championships that lost all 10 games and saw the club demoted to Group B. Five years later, Lackey made a second appearance for the national team, helping the team go undefeated in Group B and return to the top bracket.

Lackey retired as a player after the 1974 season and turned to coaching. He remained in the Green Bay area and worked as a guidance counselor while coaching youth hockey. Beginning in 2004, the Green Bay Gamblers have listed Lackey as an honorary coach for his contributions to hockey in the area. He was inducted into the Upper Peninsula Sports Hall of Fame in 2006.

== Career statistics ==
=== Regular season and playoffs ===
			Regular Season					Playoffs
Season	Team	League	GP	G	A	Pts	PIM	GP	G	A	Pts	PIM
1961–62	Michigan State	WCHA	22	4	9	13	10	—	—	—	—	—
1962–63	Michigan State	WCHA	21	1	13	14	21	—	—	—	—	—
1963–64	Michigan State	WCHA	24	7	16	23	26	—	—	—	—	—
1964–65	Toledo Blades	IHL	64	6	17	23	79	3	0	1	1	0
1965–66	Marquette Iron Rangers	USHL	—	—	—	—	—	—	—	—	—	—
1966–67	Marquette Iron Rangers	USHL	—	—	—	—	—	—	—	—	—	—
1967–68	Green Bay Bobcats	USHL	—	10	4	14	53	—	—	—	—	—
1968–69	Green Bay Bobcats	USHL	—	—	—	—	—	—	—	—	—	—
1969–70	Green Bay Bobcats	USHL	—	—	—	—	—	—	—	—	—	—
1970–71	Green Bay Bobcats	USHL	—	—	—	—	—	—	—	—	—	—
1971–72	Green Bay Bobcats	USHL	—	7	23	30	0	—	—	—	—	—
1972–73	Green Bay Bobcats	USHL	29	4	13	17	18	—	—	—	—	—
1973–74	Green Bay Bobcats	USHL	—	—	—	—	—	—	—	—	—	—
NCAA Totals			67	12	38	50	57	—	—	—	—	—

=== International ===
Year	Team	GP	G	A	Pts	PIM
1969	United States	10	3	1	4	12
1974	United States	—	—	—	—	—

== Awards and honors ==
Award	Year
All-WCHA Second Team	1963–64
AHCA West All-American	1963–64
