= Jim Mattson =

American ice hockey player

- Born: March 3, 1931 (age 95) St. Louis Park, Minnesota, USA
- Position: Goaltender
- Played for: Minnesota; Fort Wayne Komets; Green Bay Bobcats
- Playing career: 1952–1971

James Mattson is an American ice hockey goaltender who backstopped Minnesota to its first two NCAA Tournament appearances.

== Career ==
Mattson grew up playing junior hockey in the Minnesota area, but for his senior year of high school he headed to Nova Scotia. He only appeared in 7 games for the Halifax St. Mary's because he joined the University of Minnesota for the spring semester in 1952. Mattson played 8 games for the gophers, providing much needed stability in goal as Minnesota finished the season winning 7 of their final 8 games. The following year Mattson started for the Gophers and he produced phenomenal results; he tied the NCAA record with 22 wins and finished second in the nation with a 2.36 goals against average setting single-season program records in wins, g.a.a., save percentage, and helped the gophers win their first conference title (tied with Michigan). The Gophers made their first NCAA tournament appearance that season and were matched against Rensselaer in the semifinal. After a close win, Minnesota only had to defeat the Wolverines to win the championship, but Michigan was two-time defending champion and the team was just too much for the Gophers. Minnesota lost 3–7 but despite the convincing loss Mattson was named to the All-Tournament First Team. this honor was matched with his placement on the All-MCHL First Team and being an AHCA First Team All-American.

The following year Mattson's number worsened slightly but the gophers performed even better. After losing their first two games of the year, Minnesota lost just three more games (all to Michigan) to finish the regular season with a 22–5–1 mark and win the WIHL title outright. The team played so well that they were able to schedule an exhibition match with the Chicago Black Hawks before heading to Colorado Springs for the NCAA Tournament. Minnesota received the top western seed and was expected by many to win the championship. In the semifinal against Boston College Minnesota produced the most dominating performance in the history of the championship, winning 14–1. Even better for Minnesota, Michigan had lost their semifinal match and Minnesota only had to defeat Rensselaer to win the championship. Many were predicting an easy victory for the Gophers but once the game started the speed of the Bachelors caused problems for Minnesota. Rensselaer scored the first three goals of the game, keeping the puck from the high-scoring Minnesota forwards as much as possible, but, starting in the second period, the Gophers took over and notched four consecutive markers to take the lead midway through the third period. Minnesota was preparing to win their first title when Abbie Moore fired the puck past Mattson with less than four minutes to play and regulation ended in a tie. For the first overtime championship game, Minnesota appeared sluggish at the start and Rensselaer took full advantage, keeping Gophers hemmed in their own end and scoring on just the second shot in the extra session. The loss was one of the most surprising results in NCAA Tournament history and is often listed as one of if not the biggest upset in tournament history.

Mattson returned for his senior season and was named team co-captain along with John Mayasich, but because he was playing his fourth year of varsity hockey, Mattson would be ineligible to participate in the NCAA Tournament. The team slipped to third in the conference and while Mattson played all 30 games, his performance wasn't nearly as stellar as it had been the previous two seasons. While the finish wasn't the send-off he may have wanted, Mattson ended his career at Minnesota as the program's all-time leader in wins (50, a then-NCAA record), goals against average (2.86) and save percentage (.896).

After graduating Mattson signed a contract with the Detroit Red Wings and played in their minor league system for a year before joining the Eastern Hockey League. In 1959 several of his old Minnesota teammates convinced Mattson to head to Green Bay and join the year-old Green Bay Bobcats, playing 12 seasons for the team and turning the Bobcats into the league's first powerhouse. Mattson retired as a professional in 1971 but continued to play hockey whenever he could. Even in the mid-2010s, well into his 80s and dealing with the effects of Lyme disease, Mattson appeared in upwards of three adult leagues.

Mattson was inducted into the Minnesota Athletic Hall of Fame in 2005.

== Statistics ==
=== Regular season and playoffs ===
| | | | Regular season | | | | | | | | | Playoffs |
| Season | Team | League | GP | W | L | T | MIN | GA | SO | GAA | SV% | GP | W | L | MIN | GA | SO | GAA | SV% |
|---|---|---|---|---|---|---|---|---|---|---|---|---|---|---|---|---|---|---|---|
| 1949–50 | Minneapolis Bermans | AAHL | 2 | — | — | — | 120 | 20 | 0 | 10.00 | — | — | — | — | — | — | — | — | — |
| 1951–52 | Halifax St. Mary's | MMHL | 7 | 3 | 3 | 1 | 420 | 34 | 0 | 4.86 | — | — | — | — | — | — | — | — | — |
| 1951–52 | Minnesota | MCHA | 8 | — | — | — | 484 | 25 | 0 | 3.10 | .899 | — | — | — | — | — | — | — | — |
| 1952–53 | Minnesota | MCHA | 27 | 22 | 5 | 0 | 1627 | 64 | 4 | 2.36 | .910 | — | — | — | — | — | — | — | — |
| 1953–54 | Minnesota | WIHL | 26 | — | — | — | 1565 | 72 | 4 | 2.76 | .888 | — | — | — | — | — | — | — | — |
| 1954–55 | Minnesota | WIHL | 30 | 16 | 12 | 2 | 1783 | 104 | 2 | 3.50 | .888 | — | — | — | — | — | — | — | — |
| 1955–56 | Fort Wayne Komets | IHL | 19 | — | — | — | — | — | — | 3.53 | — | — | — | — | — | — | — | — | — |
| 1955–56 | Washington Lions | EHL | 12 | — | — | — | — | — | — | 4.33 | — | — | — | — | — | — | — | — | — |
| 1955–56 | Johnstown Jets | EHL | 18 | — | — | — | — | — | — | 3.67 | — | 4 | — | — | — | — | — | 4.25 | — |
| 1956–57 | Johnstown Jets | EHL | 52 | — | — | — | — | — | — | — | — | 6 | — | — | — | — | — | — | — |
| 1957–58 | Clinton Comets | EHL | 10 | — | — | — | — | — | — | — | — | — | — | — | — | — | — | — | — |
| 1957–58 | New Haven Blades | EHL | 2 | — | — | — | — | — | — | — | — | — | — | — | — | — | — | — | — |
| 1959–60 | Green Bay Bobcats | USCHL | 24 | — | — | — | — | 77 | 2 | 3.21 | — | — | — | — | — | — | — | — | — |
| 1960–61 | Green Bay Bobcats | Independent | — | — | — | — | — | — | — | — | — | — | — | — | — | — | — | — | — |
| 1961–62 | Green Bay Bobcats | USHL | — | — | — | — | — | — | — | — | — | — | — | — | — | — | — | — | — |
| 1962–63 | Green Bay Bobcats | USHL | 29 | — | — | — | — | — | — | — | — | — | — | — | — | — | — | — | — |
| 1963–64 | Green Bay Bobcats | USHL | 30 | — | — | — | — | — | — | — | — | — | — | — | — | — | — | — | — |
| 1964–65 | Green Bay Bobcats | USHL | — | — | — | — | — | — | — | — | — | — | — | — | — | — | — | — | — |
| 1965–66 | Green Bay Bobcats | USHL | 20 | — | — | — | — | — | — | — | — | — | — | — | — | — | — | — | — |
| 1966–67 | Green Bay Bobcats | USHL | 13 | — | — | — | — | — | — | — | — | — | — | — | — | — | — | — | — |
| 1967–68 | Green Bay Bobcats | USHL | 2 | — | — | — | — | — | — | — | — | — | — | — | — | — | — | — | — |
| 1968–69 | Green Bay Bobcats | USHL | — | — | — | — | — | — | — | — | — | — | — | — | — | — | — | — | — |
| 1969–70 | Green Bay Bobcats | USHL | — | — | — | — | — | — | — | — | — | — | — | — | — | — | — | — | — |
| 1970–71 | Green Bay Bobcats | USHL | — | — | — | — | — | — | — | — | — | — | — | — | — | — | — | — | — |
| NCAA totals | | | 91 | 50 | — | — | 5459 | 265 | 10 | 2.86 | .896 | — | — | — | — | — | — | — | — |

== Awards and honors ==
| Award | Year |
|---|---|
| All-MCHL First Team | 1952–53 |
| AHCA First Team All-American | 1952–53 |
| NCAA All-Tournament First Team | 1953 |
| All-WIHL First Team | 1953–54 |
| NCAA All-Tournament Second Team | 1954 |
