= Ken Hicks =

Canadian ice hockey player (born 1947)

- Born: July 18, 1946 (age 79) Crystal City, Manitoba, Canada
- Position: Forward
- Played for: MJHL; Brandon Wheat Kings; EHL; Charlotte Checkers; Florida Rockets; Jacksonville Rockets; USHL; Calumet-Houghton Chiefs; Copper Country Islanders; Copper Country Chiefs
- NHL draft: 3rd overall, 1967; Oakland Seals
- Playing career: 1967–1975

Ken Hicks (born July 18, 1947) is a Canadian former professional ice hockey player. He was selected by the Oakland Seals in the 1st round (3rd overall) of the 1967 NHL Amateur Draft, but never played in the National Hockey League. Ken Hicks played in a total of five leagues over the course of his career.

== Career statistics ==
=== Regular season and playoffs ===
			Regular season					Playoffs
Season	Team	League	GP	G	A	Pts	PIM	GP	G	A	Pts	PIM
1966–67	Brandon Wheat Kings	MJHL	N/A	31	54	85	59	-	-	-	-	-
1967–68	Charlotte Checkers	EHL-Sr.	70	19	30	49	11	-	-	-	-	-
1968–69	Jacksonville Rockets	EHL-Sr.	18	4	6	10	6	-	-	-	-	-
1972–73	Calumet-Houghton Chiefs	USHL	34	14	24	38	12	-	-	-	-	-
1973–74	Copper-Country Islanders	USHL	N/A	19	35	54	0	-	-	-	-	-
1974–75	Copper-Country Chiefs	EHL-Sr.	20	4	19	23	9	-	-	-	-	-
EHL-Sr. totals			88	23	36	59	17
USHL totals			54	37	54	85	59

Preceded by None	Oakland Seals first-round draft pick 1967	Succeeded by Tony Featherstone
