= Morris Trewin =

Canadian ice hockey player

- Born: Thunder Bay, Ontario, Canada
- Position: Goaltender
- Played for: Michigan Tech; Calumet-Houghton Chiefs; Thunder Bay Twins
- NHL draft: Undrafted
- Playing career: 1970–1975

Morris Trewin is a Canadian retired ice hockey goaltender who was an All-American for Michigan Tech.

== Career ==
Trewin made a splash in his first season as a starter for Michigan Tech, helping the team win the WCHA regular season title while allowing the fewest goals in conference. He was named to the All-WCHA first team and an All-American but could not stop 7th-place North Dakota from scoring 6 goals in the opening round of the conference tournament, ending the Huskies' season. MTU was expecting big things from their new starter in his second season, however, the team tumbled down the standings and Trewin allowed more than a goal per game more in 1972. Michigan Tech finished 7th in the standings but nearly upset Wisconsin in the tournament, losing 7–9 on aggregate.

Trewin continued to founder the next season, playing just 8 games before leaving the program when two other Huskies netminders began turning in better performances. Trewin made a few appearances for senior hockey teams over the next few years to see if he could recapture his form in 1971 but nothing came to fruition.

== Statistics ==
=== Regular season and playoffs ===
			Regular season									Playoffs
Season	Team	League	GP	W	L	T	MIN	GA	SO	GAA	SV%	GP	W	L	MIN	GA	SO	GAA	SV%
1970–71	Michigan Tech	WCHA	15	—	—	—	—	44	—	2.90	.904	—	—	—	—	—	—	—	—
1971–72	Michigan Tech	WCHA	23	—	—	—	—	95	—	4.19	.883	—	—	—	—	—	—	—	—
1972–73	Michigan Tech	WCHA	8	5	3	0	474	34	0	4.30	.865	—	—	—	—	—	—	—	—
1972–73	Calumet-Houghton Chiefs	USHL	—	—	—	—	—	—	—	—	—	—	—	—	—	—	—	—	—
1974–75	Thunder Bay Twins	USHL	7	3	3	1	311	33	0	4.81	.855	—	—	—	—	—	—	—	—
NCAA totals			46	—	—	—	—	—	—	—	—	—	—	—	—	—	—	—	—

== Awards and honors ==
Award	Year
All-WCHA First Team	1970–71
AHCA West All-American	1970–71
