= 1979–80 USHL season =

- League: United States Hockey League
- Sport: Ice hockey
- Games: 48
- Teams: 7

Regular season
- Anderson Cup: Hennepin Nordiques

Clark Cup Playoffs
- Finals champions: Hennepin Nordiques
- Runners-up: Waterloo Black Hawks

USHL seasons
- ← 1978–79 1980–81 →

The 1979–80 USHL season was the 1st season of the United States Hockey League as an all-junior league. The Hennepin Nordiques won the Anderson Cup as regular season champions and the Clark Cup as postseason champions.

== League changes ==
In 1977, the USHL began the process of converting from a semi-professional senior league into a Tier I Junior league. After about half of the league members operated only with players between the ages of 16 and 20, the remainder followed suit for this season. The result of this caused the league to set aside all of its previous records and results and essentially begin anew with this season. While several league members can trace their history to the previous senior hockey era (or earlier), the USHL currently only recognizes the results since 1979.

== Member changes ==
- Prior to the start of the season the Anoka Nordiques relocated and became the Hennepin Nordiques.

== Regular season ==
Final standings

Note: GP = Games played; W = Wins; L = Losses; T = Ties; GF = Goals for; GA = Goals against; PTS = Points; y = clinched division title; z = clinched league title

=== North Division ===
Team	GP	W	L	SOL	Pts	GF	GA
yz – Hennepin Nordiques	48	30	18	0	60	252	228
Bloomington Junior Stars	48	28	18	2	58	246	213
Green Bay Bobcats	48	23	23	2	48	239	237
St. Paul Vulcans	48	10	38	0	20	205	303

=== South Division ===
Team	GP	W	L	SOL	Pts	GF	GA
y – Waterloo Black Hawks	48	27	19	2	56	270	235
Austin Mavericks	48	24	22	2	50	239	219
Sioux City Musketeers	48	20	24	4	44	256	267

==== Scoring leaders ====
The following players led the league in regular season points at the completion of all regular season games.

Player	Team	GP	G	A	Pts	PIM
Dan Gerarden	Green Bay Bobcats	–	41	52	93	97
Mike Valesano	Sioux City Musketeers	–	40	51	91	92
Andy Widmar	Bloomington Junior Stars	–	30	57	87	16
Brian Hartman	Sioux City Musketeers	–	38	48	86	88
Tom Horan	Waterloo Black Hawks	–	53	32	85	47
Mark Schelde	Hennepin Nordiques	–	32	48	80	49
Bill Grum	Waterloo Black Hawks	48	46	31	77	30
Bill McClellan	St. Paul Vulcans	–	35	41	76	63
Dave Mogush	Bloomington Junior Stars	–	50	26	76	10
Pete Goligoski	Green Bay Bobcats	–	34	39	73	50

== Clark Cup playoffs ==
Missing information

The Dubuque Fighting Saints won the Clark Cup

== Awards ==
Award	Recipient	Team
Player of the Year	Dave Fehringer	Hennepin Nordiques
Forward of the Year	Dan Gerarden	Green Bay Bobcats
Defenseman of the Year	Bill Grillo	Waterloo Black Hawks
Goaltender of the Year	Scott Stotzner	Austin Mavericks
Coach of the Year	Dan Justin	Hennepin Nordiques
General Manager of the Year	Dan Justin	Hennepin Nordiques
