= 1975–76 USHL season =

- League: United States Hockey League
- Sport: Ice hockey
- Games: 48, 14
- Teams: 8

Regular season
- Season champions: Green Bay Bobcats

Clark Cup Playoffs
- Finals champions: Milwaukee Admirals

USHL seasons
- ← 1974–75 1976–77 →

The 1975–76 USHL season was the 15th season of the United States Hockey League as a senior league. The Green Bay Bobcats won the regular season championship while the Milwaukee Admirals won the Clark Cup as postseason champions.

== Member changes ==
- The Chicago Warriors folded.
- The Thunder Bay Twins withdrew from the USHL and joined the OHA Senior A League.
- The Copper Country Chiefs withdrew from the league in December. The league rearranged the remainder of the schedule to balance the standings.
- The Traverse City Bays joined the league as an expansion franchise.

== Regular season ==
Final standings

Note: GP = Games played; W = Wins; L = Losses; T = Ties; GF = Goals for; GA = Goals against; PTS = Points; y = clinched division title; z = clinched league title

=== Northern Conference ===
Team	GP	W	L	T	Pts	GF	GA
yz – Green Bay Bobcats	48	31	14	3	65	253	165
Traverse City Bays	48	24	23	1	49	261	223
Marquette Iron Rangers	48	7	41	0	14	122	379
Copper Country Chiefs	14	3	11	0	6	50	80

Note: Copper County withdrew from the league in December.

=== Southern Conference ===
Team	GP	W	L	T	Pts	GF	GA
y – Sioux City Musketeers	48	31	16	1	63	312	233
Waterloo Black Hawks	48	30	18	0	60	242	184
Milwaukee Admirals	48	23	25	0	46	279	270
Central Wisconsin Flyers	48	19	28	1	39	251	259

== Clark Cup playoffs ==
Missing information

The Milwaukee Admirals won the Clark Cup
