= 1974–75 USHL season =

- League: United States Hockey League
- Sport: Ice hockey
- Games: 48
- Teams: 9

Regular season
- Season champions: Green Bay Bobcats

Clark Cup Playoffs
- Finals champions: Waterloo Black Hawks

USHL seasons
- ← 1973–74 1975–76 →

The 1974–75 USHL season was the 14th season of the United States Hockey League as a senior league. The Green Bay Bobcats won the regular season championship while the Milwaukee Admirals won the Clark Cup as postseason champions.

== Member changes ==
- The Madison Blues withdrew from the USHL and joined the Continental Hockey League.
- The Copper Country Islanders rebranded as the Copper Country Chiefs.
- The Central Wisconsin Flyers joined the league as an expansion franchise.

== Regular season ==
Final standings

Note: GP = Games played; W = Wins; L = Losses; T = Ties; GF = Goals for; GA = Goals against; PTS = Points; y = clinched division title; z = clinched league title

=== Northern Conference ===
| Team | GP | W | L | T | Pts | GF | GA |
|---|---|---|---|---|---|---|---|
| yz – Green Bay Bobcats | 48 | 38 | 8 | 2 | 78 | 296 | 147 |
| Thunder Bay Twins | 48 | 36 | 10 | 2 | 74 | 315 | 159 |
| Marquette Iron Rangers | 48 | 23 | 25 | 0 | 46 | 225 | 241 |
| Copper Country Chiefs | 48 | 21 | 25 | 2 | 44 | 262 | 281 |

=== Southern Conference ===
| Team | GP | W | L | T | Pts | GF | GA |
|---|---|---|---|---|---|---|---|
| y – Waterloo Black Hawks | 48 | 30 | 15 | 3 | 63 | 221 | 165 |
| Sioux City Musketeers | 48 | 28 | 19 | 1 | 57 | 300 | 236 |
| Milwaukee Admirals | 48 | 18 | 30 | 0 | 36 | 241 | 288 |
| Chicago Warriors | 48 | 10 | 38 | 0 | 20 | 160 | 293 |
| Central Wisconsin Flyers | 48 | 7 | 41 | 0 | 14 | 145 | 355 |

== Clark Cup playoffs ==
Missing information

The Waterloo Black Hawks won the Clark Cup
