= 1976–77 USHL season =

- League: United States Hockey League
- Sport: Ice hockey
- Games: 48
- Teams: 6

Regular season
- Season champions: Grand Rapids Blades

Clark Cup Playoffs
- Finals champions: Grand Rapids Blades

USHL seasons
- ← 1975–76 1977–78 →

The 1976–77 USHL season was the 16th season of the United States Hockey League as a senior league. The Grand Rapids Blades won the regular season championship and the Clark Cup as postseason champions.

== Member changes ==
- The Central Wisconsin Flyers and Marquette Iron Rangers folded.
- The Grand Rapids Blades joined the league as an expansion franchise.

== Regular season ==
Final standings

Note: GP = Games played; W = Wins; L = Losses; T = Ties; GF = Goals for; GA = Goals against; PTS = Points; y = clinched division title; z = clinched league title

=== Northern Conference ===
| Team | GP | W | L | T | Pts | GF | GA |
|---|---|---|---|---|---|---|---|
| yz – Grand Rapids Blades | 48 | 34 | 11 | 3 | 71 | 336 | 213 |
| Green Bay Bobcats | 48 | 30 | 18 | 0 | 60 | 255 | 201 |
| Traverse City Bays | 48 | 12 | 35 | 1 | 25 | 205 | 328 |

=== Southern Conference ===
| Team | GP | W | L | T | Pts | GF | GA |
|---|---|---|---|---|---|---|---|
| y – Milwaukee Admirals | 48 | 23 | 23 | 2 | 48 | 231 | 241 |
| Sioux City Musketeers | 48 | 22 | 26 | 0 | 44 | 265 | 246 |
| Waterloo Black Hawks | 48 | 20 | 28 | 0 | 40 | 216 | 279 |

== Clark Cup playoffs ==
Missing information

The Grand Rapids Blades won the Clark Cup
