= 1973–74 USHL season =

- League: United States Hockey League
- Sport: Ice hockey
- Games: 48
- Teams: 9

Regular season
- Season champions: Thunder Bay Twins

Clark Cup Playoffs
- Finals champions: Thunder Bay Twins

USHL seasons
- ← 1972–73 1974–75 →

The 1973–74 USHL season was the 13th season of the United States Hockey League as a senior league. The Thunder Bay Twins won the regular season championship and the Clark Cup as postseason champions.

== Member changes ==
- The Sault Ste. Marie Greyhounds folded.
- The Calumet-Houghton Chiefs rebranded as the Copper Country Islanders.
- The Madison Blues joined the league as an expansion franchise.
- The USHL admitted the Milwaukee Admirals, an independent club, to the league.

== Regular season ==
Final standings

Note: GP = Games played; W = Wins; L = Losses; T = Ties; GF = Goals for; GA = Goals against; PTS = Points; y = clinched division title; z = clinched league title

=== Northern Conference ===
Team	GP	W	L	T	Pts	GF	GA
yz – Thunder Bay Twins	48	35	12	1	71	285	153
Marquette Iron Rangers	48	23	25	0	46	215	232
Green Bay Bobcats	48	18	28	2	38	225	221
Copper Country Islanders	48	15	32	1	31	161	258

=== Southern Conference ===
Team	GP	W	L	T	Pts	GF	GA
y – Madison Blues	48	32	14	2	66	276	189
Waterloo Black Hawks	48	29	18	1	59	236	183
Chicago Warriors	48	25	23	0	50	245	251
Sioux City Musketeers	48	23	24	1	47	215	245
Milwaukee Admirals	48	11	35	2	24	192	318

== Clark Cup playoffs ==
Missing information

The Thunder Bay Twins won the Clark Cup
