= 1977–78 USHL season =

- League: United States Hockey League
- Sport: Ice hockey
- Games: 51
- Teams: 6

Regular season
- Season champions: Waterloo Black Hawks

Clark Cup Playoffs
- Finals champions: Waterloo Black Hawks

USHL seasons
- ← 1976–77 1978–79 →

The 1977–78 USHL season was the 17th season of the United States Hockey League as a senior league. The Waterloo Black Hawks won the regular season championship and the Clark Cup as postseason champions.

== Member changes ==
The Grand Rapids Blades, and Traverse City Bays folded. In the wake of their departure, the USHL began looking for other teams to join the league. Around the same time, the Midwest Junior Hockey League had collapsed, leaving its surviving members with no home. The USHL decided to admit the Austin Mavericks, Bloomington Junior Stars and St. Paul Vulcans into the league. The three were the first junior teams to be a member of the USHL and put the league at a crossroads. Eventually, the USHL elected to continue officially as a semi-professional circuit with the intention of becoming a junior league in the near future. As a result of that decision, the Milwaukee Admirals opted to withdraw from the league and join the International Hockey League.

== Regular season ==
Final standings

Note: GP = Games played; W = Wins; L = Losses; T = Ties; GF = Goals for; GA = Goals against; PTS = Points; y = clinched division title; z = clinched league title

=== Midwest Conference ===
Team	GP	W	L	T	Pts	GF	GA
y – Austin Mavericks	51	20	29	2	42	233	266
Bloomington Junior Stars	51	20	29	2	42	251	287
St. Paul Vulcans	51	16	35	0	32	209	287

=== US Conference ===
Team	GP	W	L	T	Pts	GF	GA
yz – Waterloo Black Hawks	51	34	17	0	68	267	198
Sioux City Musketeers	51	34	17	0	68	288	222
Green Bay Bobcats	51	27	24	0	54	249	237

== Clark Cup playoffs ==
Missing information

The Waterloo Black Hawks won the Clark Cup
