= 1978–79 USHL season =

- League: United States Hockey League
- Sport: Ice hockey
- Games: 51–48
- Teams: 7

Regular season
- Season champions: Waterloo Black Hawks

Clark Cup Playoffs
- Finals champions: Waterloo Black Hawks

USHL seasons
- ← 1977–78 1979–80 →

The 1978–79 USHL season was the 18th season of the United States Hockey League as a senior league. The Waterloo Black Hawks won the regular season championship and the Clark Cup as postseason champions.

== League changes ==
Due in part to the collapse of the Midwest Junior Hockey League in 1977, the USHL began making plans to switch from being a senior hockey league to junior hockey. With the Austin Mavericks, Bloomington Junior Stars and St. Paul Vulcans already only using players from ages 16 and 20, the teams in the US Conference, would operate as semi-professional for this final season before becoming junior teams in 1979.

== Member changes ==
- The Anoka Nordiques joined the league as an expansion franchise and operated as a junior team.

== Regular season ==
Final standings

Note: GP = Games played; W = Wins; L = Losses; T = Ties; GF = Goals for; GA = Goals against; PTS = Points; y = clinched division title; z = clinched league title

=== Midwest Conference ===
Team	GP	W	L	T	Pts	GF	GA
y – Austin Mavericks	50	29	18	3	61	254	234
Bloomington Junior Stars	50	25	22	3	53	275	292
Anoka Nordiques	49	17	31	1	35	220	288
St. Paul Vulcans	50	12	38	0	24	170	255

=== US Conference ===
Team	GP	W	L	T	Pts	GF	GA
yz – Waterloo Black Hawks	51	39	12	0	66	304	182
Green Bay Bobcats	50	25	24	1	51	256	237
Sioux City Musketeers	49	24	25	0	48	280	271

== Clark Cup playoffs ==
Missing information

The Waterloo Black Hawks won the Clark Cup
