= Chris Oddleifson =

Canadian ice hockey player (born 1950)

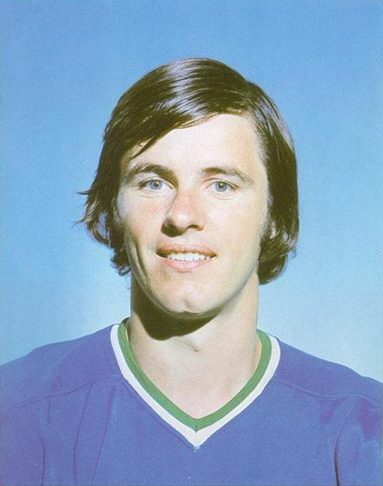
- Born: September 7, 1950 (age 75) Brandon, Manitoba, Canada
- Height: 6 ft 2 in (188 cm)
- Weight: 185 lb (84 kg; 13 st 3 lb)
- Position: Centre
- Shot: Right
- Played for: Boston Bruins; Vancouver Canucks
- NHL draft: 10th overall, 1970; California Golden Seals
- Playing career: 1972–1981

Christopher Roy Oddleifson (born September 7, 1950) is a Canadian former professional ice hockey centre who played in the National Hockey League (NHL) from 1972 until 1981. He is best known for his time with the Vancouver Canucks, where he was one of the team's top players for much of the 1970s and served as team captain in 1976–77.

== Playing career ==
Oddleifson was selected 10th overall in the 1970 NHL Amateur Draft by the California Golden Seals following a dominant final junior season with the Winnipeg Jets of the WCHL, during which he finished with 95 points (including a league-leading 64 assists) and 243 penalty minutes.

At the end of the 1969-70 season the Seals had traded their pick in the first round of the 1971 draft to the Montreal Canadiens, along with Francois Lacombe in return for Montreal's first round pick in 1970, Ernie Hicke and cash. As a result of the Seals' dreadful 1970-71 season, the Canadiens owned the top pick in the 1971 draft, and used it to select future Hall of Famer Guy Lafleur, while the Seals drafted Oddleifson with Montreal's number ten selection in 1970.

Oddleifson was assigned to the minors and never played an NHL game for the Seals, and was dealt to the Boston Bruins midway through the 1971–72 season.

In 1972–73, Oddleifson made his NHL debut, appearing in 6 games for Boston without recording a point. He managed to crack the Bruins full-time in the 1973–74 NHL season. He acquitted himself well, highlighted on December 30, 1973 by a four-goal game against the same Golden Seals that had given up on him two years earlier. On February 7, 1974 he was dealt to the Vancouver Canucks in a multi-player deal for sniper Bobby Schmautz. He finished out his rookie season with decent totals of 13 goals and 29 points in 70 games between Boston and Vancouver.

Oddleifson had his breakout year in 1974–75, as he emerged as a leader on a young Canuck team which surprisingly won their division and made the playoffs for the first time in franchise history. He proved himself to be an exceptional all-around player who possessed size, toughness, and playmaking ability, as well as the ability to play both at center and on the wing. He led the Canucks in scoring through the early part of the season, until he missed 20 games after a 4–2 away loss to the Chicago Black Hawks on 15 December 1974 due to a fractured left jaw sustained in a first-period fight with Keith Magnuson who had punched him with a right hand covered with a cast. Nevertheless, he finished with career highs of 16 goals and 35 assists for 51 points in just 60 games.

In 1975–76, Oddleifson had his finest NHL season, scoring 16 goals and a club-leading 46 assists for a career-high 62 points. Although his production waned somewhat in the next few seasons, he remained one of the team's top all-around forwards and most popular players. He was named team captain for 1976–77, although he was succeeded by Don Lever the following year. In 1977–78, he recorded a career-high 17 goals for the club.

By the 1979–80 season, the emergence of young stars like Thomas Gradin, Stan Smyl and Curt Fraser, as well as the acquisition of several skilled veterans, had pushed Oddleifson into a mainly defensive role, and he finished the season with career lows of just 8 goals and 28 points. Early in the 1980–81 campaign, he was assigned to the Dallas Black Hawks, effectively ending his NHL career.

Oddleifson spent two more seasons playing in Switzerland before retiring in 1983. He finished his NHL career with totals of 95 goals and 191 assists for 286 points in 524 games, along with 464 penalty minutes.

Following his career, Oddleifson returned to Vancouver and became a successful real estate agent. He remains active with the Canuck oldtimers squad.

== Awards and achievements ==
- MJHL Second All-Star Team (1968)
- WCHL All-Star Team (1970)
- Honoured Member of the Manitoba Hockey Hall of Fame

== Career statistics ==
			Regular season					Playoffs
Season	Team	League	GP	G	A	Pts	PIM	GP	G	A	Pts	PIM
1966–67	Winnipeg Monarchs	MJHL	8	3	3	6	10	—	—	—	—	—
1968–69	Winnipeg Jets	WCJHL	46	14	30	44	118	7	0	2	2	0
1969–70	Winnipeg Jets	WCJHL	59	31	64	95	243	14	8	19	27	90
1970–71	Providence Reds	AHL	66	15	42	57	95	10	1	4	5	21
1971–72	Oklahoma City Blazers	CHL	68	18	44	62	134	6	0	2	2	12
1972–73	Boston Bruins	NHL	6	0	0	0	0	—	—	—	—	—
1972–73	Boston Braves	AHL	63	12	42	54	127	10	3	6	9	41
1973–74	Boston Bruins	NHL	49	10	11	21	25	—	—	—	—	—
1973–74	Vancouver Canucks	NHL	21	3	5	8	19	—	—	—	—	—
1974–75	Vancouver Canucks	NHL	60	16	35	51	54	5	0	3	3	2
1975–76	Vancouver Canucks	NHL	80	16	46	62	88	2	1	2	3	0
1976–77	Vancouver Canucks	NHL	80	14	26	40	81	—	—	—	—	—
1977–78	Vancouver Canucks	NHL	78	17	22	39	64	—	—	—	—	—
1978–79	Vancouver Canucks	NHL	67	11	26	37	51	3	0	1	1	2
1979–80	Vancouver Canucks	NHL	75	8	20	28	76	4	0	0	0	4
1980–81	Vancouver Canucks	NHL	8	0	0	0	6	—	—	—	—	—
1980–81	Dallas Black Hawks	CHL	46	12	36	48	30	5	0	3	3	0
1981–82	SC Langenthal	NDB	—	—	—	—	—	—	—	—	—	—
1982–83	SC Langenthal	NDB	—	—	—	—	—	—	—	—	—	—
NHL totals			524	95	191	286	464	14	1	6	7	8

Preceded by Tony Featherstone	Oakland Seals first-round draft pick 1970	Succeeded by Rick Hampton
Preceded by Andre Boudrias	Vancouver Canucks captain 1976–77	Succeeded by Don Lever
