= Rick Hampton =

Canadian ice hockey player (born 1956)

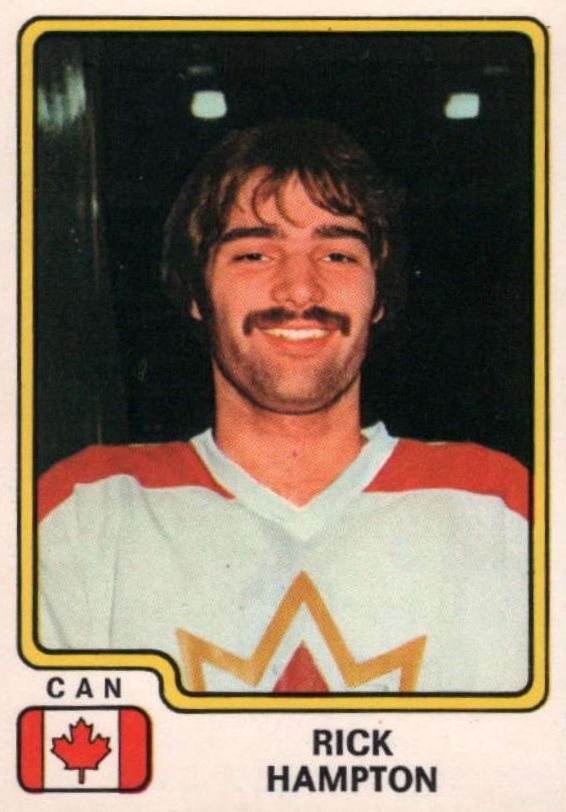
- Born: June 14, 1956 (age 70) Toronto, Ontario, Canada
- Height: 6 ft 0 in (183 cm)
- Weight: 170 lb (77 kg; 12 st 2 lb)
- Position: Defence
- Shot: Left
- Played for: California Golden Seals; Cleveland Barons; Los Angeles Kings
- National team: Canada
- NHL draft: 3rd overall, 1974; California Golden Seals
- Playing career: 1974–1984
Medal record
Representing Canada
Ice hockey
World Championships
Bronze medal – third place	1978 Prague

Richard Charles Hampton (born June 14, 1956) is a Canadian former professional ice hockey defenceman. He was born in Toronto, Ontario, but grew up in King, Ontario, and attended King City Secondary School.

Hampton started his National Hockey League (NHL) career with the California Golden Seals in 1974, staying with the team when it relocated to become the Cleveland Barons; he later played for the Los Angeles Kings. He left the NHL after the 1979–80 season. He played several more seasons in the minor leagues and retired from hockey after playing the 1983–84 season with the Rochester Americans.

== Career statistics ==
=== Regular season and playoffs ===
			Regular season					Playoffs
Season	Team	League	GP	G	A	Pts	PIM	GP	G	A	Pts	PIM
1972–73	St. Catharines Black Hawks	OHA	50	1	20	21	98	—	—	—	—	—
1973–74	St. Catharines Black Hawks	OHA	65	25	25	50	110	12	3	8	11	—
1974–75	California Golden Seals	NHL	78	8	17	25	39	—	—	—	—	—
1975–76	California Golden Seals	NHL	73	14	37	51	54	—	—	—	—	—
1976–77	Cleveland Barons	NHL	57	16	24	40	13	—	—	—	—	—
1977–78	Cleveland Barons	NHL	77	18	18	36	19	—	—	—	—	—
1978–79	Los Angeles Kings	NHL	49	3	17	20	22	2	0	0	0	0
1979–80	Los Angeles Kings	NHL	3	0	0	0	0	—	—	—	—	—
1979–80	Binghamton Dusters	AHL	19	4	5	9	11	—	—	—	—	—
1980–81	Houston Apollos	CHL	33	11	13	24	17	—	—	—	—	—
1980–81	New Brunswick Hawks	AHL	36	4	23	27	37	13	0	1	1	30
1981–82	HC Ambrì–Piotta	SUI–2	—	—	—	—	—	—	—	—	—	—
1982–83	HC Ambrì–Piotta	NDA	32	3	8	11	7	—	—	—	—	—
1983–84	Rochester Americans	AHL	21	1	3	4	7	—	—	—	—	—
NHL totals			337	59	113	172	147	2	0	0	0	0

=== International ===
Year	Team	Event	GP	G	A	Pts	PIM
1977	Canada	WC	10	1	2	3	4
1978	Canada	WC	10	0	0	0	9
Senior totals			20	1	2	3	13

Preceded by Chris Oddleifson	California Golden Seals first-round draft pick 1974	Succeeded by Ralph Klassen
