= Ralph Klassen =

Canadian ice hockey player (1955–2020)

- Born: September 15, 1955 Humboldt, Saskatchewan, Canada
- Died: August 3, 2020 (aged 64) Kinley, Saskatchewan, Canada
- Height: 5 ft 11 in (180 cm)
- Weight: 175 lb (79 kg; 12 st 7 lb)
- Position: Centre
- Shot: Left
- Played for: California Golden Seals; Cleveland Barons; Colorado Rockies; St. Louis Blues
- NHL draft: 3rd overall, 1975; California Golden Seals
- WHA draft: 5th overall, 1975; Cleveland Crusaders
- Playing career: 1975–1984

Ralph Leo Klassen (September 15, 1955 – August 3, 2020) was a Canadian professional ice hockey player who played 497 games in the National Hockey League (NHL). In Klassen's ten-year career, he played for the California Golden Seals, Cleveland Barons, Colorado Rockies, and St. Louis Blues.

== Junior hockey career ==
Klassen was born in Humboldt, Saskatchewan. He entered the major junior hockey ranks in the Western Canadian Hockey League (WCHL) at the age of 15.

Klassen played his entire major junior career with the Saskatoon Blades of the WCHL, where he skated for five seasons, as a center and left wing. His highest scoring production as a junior with the Blades was 77 points including 23 goals, in 1973–74. He captained the Blades in 1974–75, and played for the Team Canada team at the World Junior Hockey Championships, earning a silver medal in 1975. Klassen played 300 games for the Blades, second only to Fred Williams, who holds the distinction of playing the most games for the team in its history, at 319 games.

== Professional career ==
A highly skilled player who possessed explosive skating ability, Klassen was touted by pro scouts as one of the top North American players in 1975, and was appropriately selected high in the two amateur drafts: 3rd overall in the first round of the 1975 NHL Amateur Draft by the California Golden Seals and 5th overall by the Cleveland Crusaders of the World Hockey Association (WHA) in the first round of the 1975 WHA Amateur Draft. When many drafted players of that year were signing unusually large contracts, opting to begin their careers in the fledgling WHA, Klassen chose a more traditional route, and signed his first pro contract with the California Golden Seals for US$70,000 per season.

In his first professional season in 1975–76, Klassen, after a solid NHL training camp, commenced his professional hockey career with the Central Hockey League's Salt Lake Golden Eagles in the minor pro ranks. He played only four games in the minors before he was called up by California. Klassen made his NHL debut as one of two youngest players on the squad at the age of 19, along with Dennis Maruk, on October 8, 1975, at the Atlanta Flames. Klassen scored a goal in his first game. Klassen played the remaining 71 games for the Seals, racking up 6 goals and 15 assists, in his rookie year.

In 1976, the California Golden Seals were moved to Cleveland as the Cleveland Barons. In 1976–77, Klassen played for the struggling Barons and increased his scoring to 14 goals in 80 games. A solid two-way player, he was a consistent contributor to the team; however, it did not help the dismal play of the hapless Barons who won only 47 games in their two NHL seasons. In the 1977–78 season, after playing 13 games for the Barons, he was traded to the Colorado Rockies on January 9, 1978, as part of a deal with Fred Ahern for Chuck Arnason and Rick Jodzio. In Colorado, Klassen played 44 games.

Still in Colorado in the 1978–79 season, Klassen played the majority of the team's schedule, 64 games, tallying up 19 points for a team which won 15 games. Klassen was sent down to the minors, where he split the year playing 18 games for the Philadelphia Firebirds, Colorado's affiliate in the American Hockey League.

Klassen still holds a record for being with the most NHL teams in one day; Klassen was claimed by the Hartford Whalers from Colorado in the 1979 NHL Expansion Draft on June 13, 1979. Hartford immediately traded him to the New York Islanders for Terry Richardson. The Islanders then immediately traded him to the St. Louis Blues to complete a three-team deal in which St. Louis had sent Richardson and Barry Gibbs to the Islanders in exchange for future considerations.

From 1979 to 1983, Klassen played for the Blues, skating with some of the Blues' top point-getters and future all-stars, including Bernie Federko, Brian Sutter and Wayne Babych. The Blues made the playoffs each year Klassen played for them; however, the best they did was to advance to, and lose in, the second round in 1981, 1982 and 1984.

In all, almost half of Klassen's NHL playing career was in St. Louis, where he played 225 games. His highest point total in St. Louis was in his first season in 1979–80, when he chalked up 9 goals and 16 assists for 25 total points. In total, he had 25 goals and 37 assists in over four seasons with the Blues, after playing in five games and not registering a point with St. Louis in the 1983–84 season.

After his NHL tenure, which produced 52 goals in total, he retired in November 1983 at the age of 28.

== Post hockey ==
After his NHL career, Klassen resided in Saskatoon, Saskatchewan, working as a mail carrier for Canada Post. After retiring from Canada Post, he resided in the village of Kinley, Saskatchewan, and was the coach of the "Perdue Pirates" Sr. Hockey club in the Saskatchewan Prairie Hockey League. Klassen participated in local events in the community.

Klassen died on August 3, 2020, from cancer.

== Career statistics ==
=== Regular season and playoffs ===
| | | | Regular season | | | | | Playoffs |
| Season | Team | League | GP | G | A | Pts | PIM | GP | G | A | Pts | PIM |
|---|---|---|---|---|---|---|---|---|---|---|---|---|
| 1970–71 | Saskatoon Blades | WCHL | 61 | 1 | 8 | 9 | 29 | 3 | 0 | 0 | 0 | 0 |
| 1971–72 | Saskatoon Blades | WCHL | 62 | 17 | 38 | 55 | 64 | 8 | 1 | 5 | 6 | 7 |
| 1972–73 | Saskatoon Blades | WCHL | 68 | 19 | 47 | 66 | 80 | 16 | 5 | 3 | 8 | 16 |
| 1973–74 | Saskatoon Blades | WCHL | 68 | 23 | 54 | 77 | 110 | 6 | 0 | 3 | 3 | 7 |
| 1974–75 | Saskatoon Blades | WCHL | 41 | 21 | 47 | 68 | 34 | 17 | 5 | 23 | 28 | 14 |
| 1975–76 | California Golden Seals | NHL | 71 | 6 | 15 | 21 | 26 | — | — | — | — | — |
| 1975–76 | Salt Lake Golden Eagles | CHL | 4 | 3 | 3 | 6 | 4 | — | — | — | — | — |
| 1976–77 | Cleveland Barons | NHL | 80 | 14 | 18 | 32 | 23 | — | — | — | — | — |
| 1977–78 | Cleveland Barons | NHL | 13 | 2 | 1 | 3 | 6 | — | — | — | — | — |
| 1977–78 | Colorado Rockies | NHL | 44 | 6 | 9 | 15 | 8 | 2 | 0 | 0 | 0 | 0 |
| 1978–79 | Colorado Rockies | NHL | 64 | 6 | 13 | 19 | 12 | — | — | — | — | — |
| 1978–79 | Philadelphia Firebirds | AHL | 18 | 3 | 9 | 12 | 2 | — | — | — | — | — |
| 1979–80 | St. Louis Blues | NHL | 80 | 9 | 16 | 25 | 10 | 3 | 0 | 0 | 0 | 0 |
| 1980–81 | St. Louis Blues | NHL | 66 | 6 | 12 | 18 | 23 | 11 | 2 | 0 | 2 | 2 |
| 1981–82 | St. Louis Blues | NHL | 45 | 3 | 7 | 10 | 6 | 10 | 2 | 2 | 4 | 10 |
| 1982–83 | St. Louis Blues | NHL | 29 | 0 | 2 | 2 | 6 | — | — | — | — | — |
| 1982–83 | Salt Lake Golden Eagles | CHL | 21 | 9 | 10 | 19 | 8 | 6 | 2 | 6 | 8 | 5 |
| 1983–84 | St. Louis Blues | NHL | 5 | 0 | 0 | 0 | 0 | — | — | — | — | — |
| NHL totals | | | 497 | 52 | 93 | 145 | 120 | 26 | 4 | 2 | 6 | 12 |

=== International ===
| Year | Team | Event | GP | G | A | Pts | PIM |
|---|---|---|---|---|---|---|---|
| 1975 | Canada | WJC | 4 | 0 | 3 | 3 | 0 |
| 1977 | Canada | WC | 10 | 1 | 5 | 6 | 0 |

| Preceded by Rick Hampton | California Golden Seals first-round draft pick 1975 | Succeeded by Björn Johansson |
