= 1964–65 USHL season =

- League: United States Hockey League
- Sport: Ice hockey
- Games: 28–26
- Teams: 5

Regular season
- Season champions: Waterloo Black Hawks

Clark Cup Playoffs
- Finals champions: Waterloo Black Hawks

USHL seasons
- ← 1963–64 1965–66 →

The 1964–65 USHL season was the 4th season of the United States Hockey League as a senior league. The Waterloo Black Hawks won the regular season championship and the Clark Cup as postseason champions.

== Member changes ==
- The Marquette Iron Rangers joined as an expansion franchise.

== Regular season ==
Final standings

Note: GP = Games played; W = Wins; L = Losses; T = Ties; GF = Goals for; GA = Goals against; PTS = Points; y = clinched league title

Team	GP	W	L	T	Pts	GF	GA
y – Waterloo Black Hawks	28	17	11	0	34	129	110
Rochester Mustangs	28	15	13	0	30	111	104
St. Paul Steers	26	15	11	0	30	133	116
Green Bay Bobcats	28	11	17	0	22	131	156
Marquette Iron Rangers	26	10	16	0	20	103	121

== Clark Cup playoffs ==
Missing information

The Waterloo Black Hawks won the Clark Cup
