= List of California Golden Seals draft picks =

The California Golden Seals were a professional ice hockey franchise based in Oakland, California from 1967–76. They played their first seven seasons in the West Division and their final two seasons in the Adams Division. During their time in Oakland the Golden Seals drafted 72 players and participated in ten National Hockey League Amateur Drafts before the franchise relocated to Cleveland, Ohio on July 14, 1976.

This list features every player drafted by the Golden Seals and his regular season stats for his career.

The Golden Seals' first draft pick was Ken Hicks who was selected third overall in the 1967 NHL Amateur Draft. The highest that California ever drafted was third overall, which they did three times, selecting Ken Hicks (1967), Rick Hampton (1974) and Ralph Klassen (1975). No Golden Seals' draft pick ever played in over 1,000 NHL games, the closest any player selected by the team came to this mark was Ron Stackhouse who played in 889 regular season games. To date no Golden Seals' draft pick has ever been selected to the Hockey Hall of Fame.

== Key ==
# Played at least one game with the Seals
↑ Spent entire NHL career with the Seals

General terms and abbreviations
Term or abbreviation	Definition
Draft	The year that the player was selected
Round	The round of the draft in which the player was selected
Pick	The overall position in the draft at which the player was selected

Position abbreviations
Abbreviation	Definition
G	Goaltender
D	Defense
LW	Left wing
C	Center
RW	Right wing
F	Forward

Abbreviations for statistical columns
Abbreviation	Definition
Pos	Position
GP	Games played
G	Goals
A	Assists
Pts	Points
PIM	Penalties in minutes
W	Wins
L	Losses
T	Ties
GAA	Goals against average
—	Does not apply

== Draft picks ==
Draft	Round	Pick	Player	Nationality	Pos	GP	G	A	Pts	PIM	W	L	T	GAA
1967	1	3	Ken Hicks	Canada	C	—	—	—	—	—	—	—	—	—
1967	2	12	Gary Wood	United States	D	—	—	—	—	—	—	—	—	—
1967	3	18	Kevin Smith	Canada	D	—	—	—	—	—	—	—	—	—
1968	2	13	Doug Smith	Canada	C	—	—	—	—	—	—	—	—	—
1968	3	20	Jim Trewin	Canada	D	—	—	—	—	—	—	—	—	—
1969	1	7	Tony Featherstone#	Canada	RW	130	17	21	38	65	—	—	—	—
1969	2	18	Ron Stackhouse#	Canada	D	889	87	372	459	824	—	—	—	—
1969	3	29	Don O'Donoghue↑	Canada	RW	125	18	17	35	35	—	—	—	—
1969	4	41	Pierre Farmer	Canada	D	—	—	—	—	—	—	—	—	—
1969	5	53	Warren Harrison	Canada	C	—	—	—	—	—	—	—	—	—
1969	6	65	Neil Nicholson#	Canada	D	39	3	1	4	23	—	—	—	—
1969	7	76	Pete Vipond↑	Canada	LW	3	0	0	0	0	—	—	—	—
1970	1	10	Chris Oddleifson	Canada	C	524	95	191	286	464	—	—	—	—
1970	2	19	Pete Laframboise#	Canada	LW	227	33	55	88	70	—	—	—	—
1970	3	33	Randy Rota	Canada	C	212	38	39	87	60	—	—	—	—
1970	4	47	Ted McAneeley↑	Canada	D	158	8	35	43	141	—	—	—	—
1970	5	61	Ray Gibbs	Canada	G	—	—	—	—	—	—	—	—	—
1970	6	75	Doug Moyes	Canada	LW	—	—	—	—	—	—	—	—	—
1970	7	88	Terry Murray#	Canada	D	302	4	76	80	199	—	—	—	—
1970	8	100	Alan Henry	Canada	D	—	—	—	—	—	—	—	—	—
1971	2	15	Ken Baird↑	Canada	D	10	0	2	2	15	—	—	—	—
1971	3	29	Rich LeDuc	Canada	C	130	28	38	66	69	—	—	—	—
1971	4	43	Hartland Monahan#	Canada	RW	334	61	80	141	163	—	—	—	—
1971	5	57	Ray Belanger	Canada	G	—	—	—	—	—	—	—	—	—
1971	6	71	Gerry Egers	Canada	D	—	—	—	—	—	—	—	—	—
1971	7	85	Al Simmons#	Canada	D	11	0	1	1	21	—	—	—	—
1971	8	99	Angus Beck	Canada	C	—	—	—	—	—	—	—	—	—
1971	8	104	Rod Lyons	Canada	LW	—	—	—	—	—	—	—	—	—
1972	2	22	Tom Cassidy	Canada	C	26	3	4	7	15	—	—	—	—
1972	2	28	Stan Weir#	Canada	C	642	139	207	346	183	—	—	—	—
1972	3	38	Paul Shakes↑	Canada	D	21	0	4	4	12	—	—	—	—
1972	4	54	Claude St. Sauveur	Canada	C	79	24	24	48	23	—	—	—	—
1972	5	70	Tim Jacobs#	Canada	D	46	0	10	10	35	—	—	—	—
1972	6	86	Jacques Lefebvre	Canada	G	—	—	—	—	—	—	—	—	—
1972	7	102	Mike Amodeo	Canada	D	19	0	0	0	2	—	—	—	—
1972	8	118	Brent Meeke#	Canada	F	75	9	22	31	8	—	—	—	—
1972	9	134	Denis Meloche	Canada	F	—	—	—	—	—	—	—	—	—
1973	3	34	Jeff Jacques	Canada	RW	—	—	—	—	—	—	—	—	—
1973	4	50	Ron Serafini↑	United States	D	2	0	0	0	2	—	—	—	—
1973	5	66	Jim Moxey#	Canada	F	127	22	27	49	59	—	—	—	—
1973	6	82	Willie Trognitz	Canada	F	—	—	—	—	—	—	—	—	—
1973	7	98	Paul Tantardini	Canada	LW	—	—	—	—	—	—	—	—	—
1973	8	114	Bruce Greig↑	Canada	LW	9	0	1	1	46	—	—	—	—
1973	9	130	Larry Patey#	Canada	C	717	153	163	316	631	—	—	—	—
1973	10	145	Doug Mahood	Canada	RW	—	—	—	—	—	—	—	—	—
1973	11	160	Angie Moretto	Canada	C	5	1	2	3	2	—	—	—	—
1974	1	3	Rick Hampton#	Canada	D	337	59	113	172	147	—	—	—	—
1974	1	17	Ron Chipperfield	Canada	C	83	22	24	46	34	—	—	—	—
1974	2	21	Bruce Affleck	Canada	D	280	14	66	80	86	—	—	—	—
1974	3	39	Charlie Simmer#	Canada	F	712	342	369	711	544	—	—	—	—
1974	4	57	Tom Price#	Canada	D	29	0	2	2	12	—	—	—	—
1974	5	75	Jim Warden	United States	G	—	—	—	—	—	—	—	—	—
1974	6	93	Tom Sundberg	Canada	F	—	—	—	—	—	—	—	—	—
1974	7	111	Tom Anderson	United States	D	—	—	—	—	—	—	—	—	—
1974	8	128	Jim McCabe	Canada	C	—	—	—	—	—	—	—	—	—
1975	1	3	Ralph Klassen#	Canada	F	497	52	93	145	120	—	—	—	—
1975	2	21	Dennis Maruk#	Canada	C	888	356	522	878	761	—	—	—	—
1975	3	39	John Tweedle	Canada	F	—	—	—	—	—	—	—	—	—
1975	4	57	Greg Smith#	Canada	D	829	56	232	288	1112	—	—	—	—
1975	5	75	Doug Young	Canada	D	—	—	—	—	—	—	—	—	—
1975	6	93	Larry Hendrick	Canada	G	—	—	—	—	—	—	—	—	—
1975	7	111	Rick Shinske	Canada	C	63	5	16	21	10	—	—	—	—
1975	8	129	Doug Schoenfeld	Canada	D	—	—	—	—	—	—	—	—	—
1975	9	146	Jim Weaver	Canada	G	—	—	—	—	—	—	—	—	—
1975	10	162	Greg Agar	Canada	RW	—	—	—	—	—	—	—	—	—
1976	1	5	Bjorn Johansson	Sweden	D	15	1	1	2	10	—	—	—	—
1976	2	23	Vern Stenlund	Canada	C	4	0	0	0	0	—	—	—	—
1976	3	41	Mike Fidler	United States	LW	271	84	97	181	124	—	—	—	—
1976	4	59	Warren Young	Canada	F	236	72	77	149	472	—	—	—	—
1976	5	77	Darcy Regier	Canada	D	26	0	2	2	35	—	—	—	—
1976	5	79	Cal Sandbeck	United States	D	—	—	—	—	—	—	—	—	—
1976	6	95	Jouni Rinne	Finland	F	—	—	—	—	—	—	—	—	—

== See also ==
- List of California Golden Seals players
- List of Cleveland Barons draft picks
- 1967 NHL Expansion Draft
