= Tony Featherstone =

Canadian ice hockey player (1949–2021)

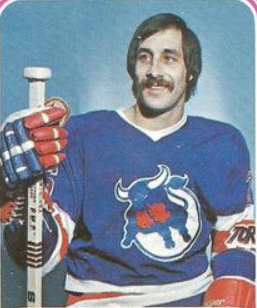
- Featherstone in 1975 card
- Born: July 31, 1949 Toronto, Ontario, Canada
- Died: October 30, 2021 (aged 72) Toronto, Ontario, Canada
- Height: 5 ft 11 in (180 cm)
- Weight: 187 lb (85 kg; 13 st 5 lb)
- Position: Right wing
- Shot: Right
- Played for: Oakland Seals; California Golden Seals; Minnesota North Stars; Toronto Toros
- NHL draft: 7th overall, 1969; Oakland Seals
- Playing career: 1969–1976

Anthony James Featherstone (July 31, 1949 – October 30, 2021) was a Canadian professional ice hockey forward who played 130 games in the National Hockey League for the California Golden Seals and Minnesota North Stars. He also played 108 games in the World Hockey Association with the Toronto Toros.

Featherstone died on October 30, 2021, at the age of 72.

== Career statistics ==
=== Regular season and playoffs ===
			Regular season					Playoffs
Season	Team	League	GP	G	A	Pts	PIM	GP	G	A	Pts	PIM
1966–67	Kitchener Greenshirts	MetJHL	—	—	—	—	—	—	—	—	—	—
1967–68	Peterborough Petes	OHA	43	11	11	22	109	5	3	0	3	28
1968–69	Peterborough Petes	OHA	54	29	38	67	167	10	3	5	8	56
1969–70	Providence Reds	AHL	55	15	25	40	78	—	—	—	—	—
1969–70	Oakland Seals	NHL	9	0	1	1	17	2	0	0	0	0
1970–71	California Golden Seals	NHL	67	8	8	16	44	—	—	—	—	—
1971–72	Nova Scotia Voyageurs	AHL	56	5	10	15	50	15	5	4	9	36
1972–73	Nova Scotia Voyageurs	AHL	74	49	54	103	78	13	10	13	23	34
1973–74	Minnesota North Stars	NHL	54	9	12	21	4	—	—	—	—	—
1974–75	Toronto Toros	WHA	76	25	38	63	26	6	2	1	3	2
1975–76	Toronto Toros	WHA	32	4	7	11	5	—	—	—	—	—
WHA totals			108	29	45	74	31	6	2	1	3	2
NHL totals			130	17	21	38	65	2	0	0	0	0

Preceded by Ken Hicks	Oakland Seals first-round draft pick 1969	Succeeded by Chris Oddleifson
