= List of USHL alumni to play in the NHL =

List of United States Hockey League alumni who have played in the National Hockey League.

== A ==
Player	USHL team	NHL team
Justin Abdelkader	Cedar Rapids	Detroit Red Wings
Andrew Alberts	Waterloo	Vancouver Canucks
Keith Aldridge	Rochester	Dallas Stars
Conor Allen	Sioux Falls	New York Rangers
Tyler Arnason	Fargo-Moorhead	Colorado Avalanche
Zach Aston-Reese	Lincoln	Detroit Red Wings
Mason Appleton	Tri-City	Winnipeg Jets

== B ==
Player	USHL team	NHL team
David Backes	Lincoln	Boston Bruins
Jozef Balej	Thunder Bay/Rochester	Vancouver Canucks
Keith Ballard	Omaha	Vancouver Canucks
Ralph Barahona	Austin/Rochester	Boston Bruins
Adam Berkhoel	Twin Cities	Atlanta Thrashers
Tom Bissett	Waterloo	Detroit Red Wings
Anthony Bitetto	Indiana	Nashville Predators
Jason Blake	Waterloo	Anaheim Ducks
John Blue	Des Moines	Buffalo Sabres
Brandon Bochenski	Lincoln	Boston Bruins
Jared Boll	Lincoln	Columbus Blue Jackets
Brandon Bollig	Lincoln	Chicago Blackhawks
J. T. Brown	Waterloo	Anaheim Ducks
Zeev Buium	US NTDP	Minnesota Wild
John Byce	Madison	Boston Bruins

== C ==
Player	USHL team	NHL team
Ryan Caldwell	Thunder Bay	New York Islanders
Matt Carle	River City	Nashville Predators
John Carlson	Indiana	Washington Capitals
Ryan Carter	Green Bay Gamblers	New Jersey Devils
Macklin Celebrini	Chicago Steel	San Jose Sharks
Noah Clarke	Des Moines	Los Angeles Kings
Scott Clemmensen	Des Moines	Florida Panthers
Nathan Clurman	Des Moines	Montreal Canadiens
Ben Clymer	Rochester	Washington Capitals
Erik Cole	Des Moines	Carolina Hurricanes
Pheonix Copley	Des Moines	Las Angeles Kings
Ty Conklin	Green Bay	Detroit Red Wings
Kyle Connor	Youngstown	Winnipeg Jets
Logan Cooley	US NTDP	Utah Mammoth
Joe Corvo	Omaha	Ottawa Senators
Joey Crabb	Green Bay	Atlanta Thrashers
Mark Cullen	Fargo-Moorhead	Chicago Blackhawks

== D ==
Player	USHL team	NHL team
Thatcher Demko	Omaha	Vancouver Canucks
Dan Dorion	Austin	New Jersey Devils
Joe Dziedzic	St. Paul	Phoenix Coyotes

== E ==
Player	USHL team	NHL team
Mark Eaton	Waterloo	Pittsburgh Penguins
Dan Ellis	Omaha	Anaheim Ducks

== F ==
Player	USHL team	NHL team
Adam Fantilli	Chicago Steel	Columbus Blue Jackets
Ruslan Fedotenko	Sioux City	Philadelphia Flyers
Brian Ferlin	Indiana	Boston Bruins
Chris Ferraro	Dubuque/Waterloo	Washington Capitals
Peter Ferraro	Dubuque/Waterloo	New York Islanders
Joe Finley	Sioux Falls	New York Islanders
Alex Foster	Sioux Falls	Toronto Maple Leafs

== G ==
Player	USHL team	NHL team
Adam Gaudette	Cedar Rapids	Vancouver Canucks
Johnny Gaudreau	Dubuque	Calgary Flames
Cutter Gauthier	US NTDP	Anaheim Ducks
Ken Gernander	Des Moines	New York Rangers
Zemgus Girgensons	Dubuque	Buffalo Sabres
Alex Goligoski	Sioux Falls	Dallas Stars
John Grahame	Sioux City	Carolina Hurricanes
Matt Greene	Green Bay	Los Angeles Kings
John Gruden	Waterloo	Washington Capitals
Jake Guentzel	Sioux City	Tampa Bay Lightning

== H ==
Player	USHL team	NHL team
David Hale	Sioux City	Calgary Flames
Matt Henderson	St. Paul	Chicago Blackhawks
Ben Holmstrom	Sioux Falls	Philadelphia Flyers
Phil Housley	St. Paul	Toronto Maple Leafs
Jimmy Howard	USA NTDP	Detroit Red Wings
Jack Hughes	USA NTDP	New Jersey Devils
Lane Hutson	USA NTDP	Montreal Canadiens

== I ==
Player	USHL team	NHL team
Alex Iafallo	Fargo	Los Angeles Kings

== J ==
Player	USHL team	NHL team
Tim Jackman	Twin Cities	Anaheim Ducks
Joe Jensen	Sioux Falls	Carolina Hurricanes
Greg Johnson	Thunder Bay	Detroit Red Wings
Jim Johnson	St. Paul	Phoenix Coyotes
Ryan Johnson	Thunder Bay	St. Louis Blues
Marc Johnstone	Chicago	Pittsburgh Penguins
Matt Jones	Green Bay	Phoenix Coyotes

== K ==
Player	USHL team	NHL team
Chris Kenady	St. Paul	New York Rangers
Trent Klatt	St. Paul	Los Angeles Kings
Rostislav Klesla	Sioux City	Phoenix Coyotes
Fred Knipscheer	Omaha	St. Louis Blues
Matt Koalska	Twin Cities	New York Islanders
Dieter Kochan	Sioux City	Minnesota Wild
Tim Kennedy	Sioux City	Buffalo Sabres
Torey Krug	Indiana	St.Louis Blues

== L ==
Player	USHL team	NHL team
Noah Laba	Lincoln	New York Rangers
Alex Laferriere	Des Moines	Los Angeles Kings
Bryce Lampman	Omaha	New York Rangers
Josh Langfeld	Lincoln	Detroit Red Wings
Chad Larose	Sioux Falls	Carolina Hurricanes
Ryan Leonard	US NTDP	Washington Capitals
Trevor Lewis	Des Moines	Los Angeles Kings
Charlie Lindgren	Sioux Falls	Montreal Canadiens

== M ==
Player	USHL Team	NHL team
Ryan Malone	Omaha	Tampa Bay Lightning
Alec Martinez	Cedar Rapids	Vegas Golden Knights
Andy Miele	Cedar Rapids/Chicago	Phoenix Coyotes
Casey Mittelstadt	Green Bay	Boston Bruins
David Moss	Cedar Rapids	Calgary Flames
Auston Matthews	USNTDP Juniors	Toronto Maple Leafs
Justin Mercier	St Louis Eagles	Colorado Avalanche
Brandon Montour	Waterloo Black Hawks	Seattle Kraken

== N ==
Player	USHL team	NHL team
Frank Nazar	US NTDP	Chicago Blackhawks
Andreas Nödl	Sioux Falls	Carolina Hurricanes

== O ==
Player	USHL team	NHL team
Kyle Okposo	Des Moines	Florida Panthers
Will O'Neill	Omaha	Philadelphia Flyers
Josh Olson	Omaha	Florida Panthers
Jed Ortmeyer	Omaha	New York Rangers
T. J. Oshie	Sioux Falls	Washington Capitals

== P ==
Player	USHL team	NHL team
Max Pacioretty	Sioux City	Toronto Maple Leafs
Joe Pavelski	Waterloo	Dallas Stars
Mike Peluso	Omaha	Philadelphia Flyers
Gabe Perrault	US NDTP	New York Rangers
Toby Petersen	Fargo-Moorhead	Edmonton Oilers
Brent Peterson	Thunder Bay	Tampa Bay Lightning
Jeff Petry	Des Moines	Detroit Red Wings
Neal Pionk	Sioux City	Winnipeg Jets
Rem Pitlick	Waterloo/Muskegon	Montreal Canadiens
Derek Plante	Madison	Philadelphia Flyers
Shjon Podein	Rochester	Colorado Avalanche
John Pohl	Twin Cities	Toronto Maple Leafs
Ryan Potulny	Lincoln	Chicago Blackhawks
Owen Power	Chicago Steel	Buffalo Sabres
Tom Preissing	Green Bay	Ottawa Senators
Sean Pronger	Thunder Bay	Vancouver Canucks
Nate Prosser	Sioux Falls	Minnesota Wild
Teddy Purcell	Cedar Rapids Roughriders	Tampa Bay Lightning

== R ==
Player	USHL team	NHL team
Brian Rafalski	Madison	Detroit Red Wings
Kyle Rau	Sioux Falls	Florida Panthers
Joel Rechlicz	Indiana	New York Islanders
Zach Redmond	Sioux Falls	Montreal Canadiens
Danny Richmond	Chicago	Chicago Blackhawks
Andy Roach	Waterloo	St. Louis Blues
Jon Rohloff	St. Paul	Boston Bruins
Todd Rohloff	St. Paul	Washington Capitals
Kevin Roy	Lincoln	Anaheim Ducks

== S ==
Player	USHL team	NHL team
Kurt Sauer	North Iowa	Colorado Avalanche
Jaden Schwartz	Tri-City	Seattle Kraken
Peter Sejna	Des Moines	St. Louis Blues
Dan Sexton	Sioux Falls	Anaheim Ducks
Patrick Sharp	Thunder Bay	Dallas Stars
Richard Shulmistra	Thunder Bay	New Jersey Devils
Jaccob Slavin	Chicago	Carolina Hurricanes
Will Smith	USA NTDP	San Jose Sharks
Peter Smrek	Des Moines	New York Rangers
Dave Snuggerud	Bloomington	Philadelphia Flyers
Paul Stastny	River City	St. Louis Blues
Yan Stastny	Omaha	Boston Bruins
Ray Staszak	Austin	Detroit Red Wings
Colin Stuart	Lincoln	Atlanta Thrashers
Mark Stuart	Rochester	Boston Bruins
Mike Stuart	Rochester	St. Louis Blues
Andrej Sustr	Youngstown	Tampa Bay Lightning
Gary Suter	Dubuque	San Jose Sharks
Brian Swanson	Omaha	Atlanta Thrashers

== T ==
Player	USHL team	NHL team
Jeff Taffe	Rochester	Phoenix Coyotes
Daniil Tarasov	Indiana	San Jose Sharks
Ryan Thang	Sioux Falls/Omaha	Nashville Predators
Bill Thomas	Tri-City	Phoenix Coyotes
Billy Tibbetts	Sioux City	New York Rangers
Corey Tropp	Sioux Falls	Anaheim Ducks

== V ==
Player	USHL team	NHL team
Thomas Vanek	Sioux Falls	Buffalo Sabres
Joe Vitale	Sioux Falls	Pittsburgh Penguins

== W ==
Player	USHL team	NHL team
Duvie Westcott	Omaha	Columbus Blue Jackets
David Wilkie	Omaha	New York Rangers
Landon Wilson	Dubuque	Pittsburgh Penguins
Tommy Wingels	Cedar Rapids	San Jose Sharks
Andy Wozniewski	Dubuque	Toronto Maple Leafs

== Z ==
Player	USHL team	NHL team
Rick Zombo	Austin	St. Louis Blues

== Sources ==
- USHL 2006-07 Media Guide
