= Karen Koch =

American ice hockey player

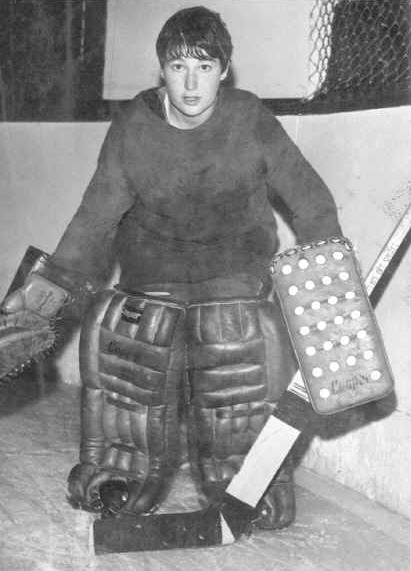
- Born: 1951 (age 74–75); Monroe, Michigan, United States

Karen Koch [pronounced "Cook"] (born 1951) is an American former ice hockey goaltender. She played for the Marquette Iron Rangers in the United States Hockey League during the 1969–70 season. She signed a contract for $40 per game which made her the first professional female hockey player in North America. As of 2000, as far as her coach, Leonard "Oakie" Brumm, knew, she was the first in the world.

== Personal life ==
Since her hockey days, Koch has earned a bachelor's and a master's degree, both in English literature, from Wayne State University and the University of Dayton respectively. She holds a black belt in judo and a brown belt in jujitsu. Koch loves birds and all creatures of the wild.

== Hockey career ==
The USHL welcomed her as the first female professional hockey player when she was only 18. At the time, the Iron Rangers were the defending champs. Leonard "Oakie" Brumm, then coach for the past eighteen seasons, has said her only drawback was her size and that since they were larger, the team's other goalies "stopped more pucks by accident than she did on purpose."

Her addition to the team brought complaints from the other players, despite their admittance that she was good. It also brought national publicity as the team got calls from the Associated Press, United Press International, Reuters, and newspapers, radio, and TV stations from all over the U.S. and Canada. When it came time to cut the team down to eighteen players and two goalies, the coach adjusted the numbers so that he could keep her on the team. Her presence caused such a stir that the Sault Ste. Marie, Ontario officials insisted that she be announced as the starting goaltender to swell attendance. They also set up a pre-game penalty shot with then-mayor John Rhodes, who had been a hockey player in the past. Karen received a standing ovation when she stopped Rhodes' shot.

She was eventually let go from the Iron Rangers after repeatedly going against her coach's orders and removing her mask during the after-Christmas games. There were ten games left in the schedule at the time. She went on to play in the Toronto area and made national headlines again when she was barred by the Canadian Amateur Hockey Association from playing on men's teams.
