= 1971–72 USHL season =

- League: United States Hockey League
- Sport: Ice hockey
- Games: 32
- Teams: 5

Regular season
- Season champions: Green Bay Bobcats

Clark Cup Playoffs
- Finals champions: Green Bay Bobcats

USHL seasons
- ← 1970–71 1972–73 →

The 1971–72 USHL season was the 11th season of the United States Hockey League as a senior league. The Green Bay Bobcats won the regular season championship and the Clark Cup as postseason champions.

== Member changes ==
None

== Regular season ==
Final standings

Note: GP = Games played; W = Wins; L = Losses; T = Ties; GF = Goals for; GA = Goals against; PTS = Points; y = clinched league title

Team	GP	W	L	T	Pts	GF	GA
y – Green Bay Bobcats	32	21	9	2	44	134	98
Waterloo Black Hawks	32	15	17	0	30	130	136
Thunder Bay Twins	32	15	17	0	30	158	141
Marquette Iron Rangers	32	14	16	2	30	136	150
Soo Canadians	32	12	18	2	26	121	154

== Clark Cup playoffs ==
Missing information

The Green Bay Bobcats won the Clark Cup
