= 1963–64 USHL season =

- League: United States Hockey League
- Sport: Ice hockey
- Games: 30, 18
- Teams: 4

Regular season
- Season champions: Waterloo Black Hawks

Clark Cup Playoffs
- Finals champions: Waterloo Black Hawks

USHL seasons
- ← 1962–63 1964–65 →

The 1963–64 USHL season was the 3rd season of the United States Hockey League as a senior league. The Waterloo Black Hawks won the regular season championship and the Clark Cup as postseason champions.

== Member changes ==
- The Des Moines Oak Leafs withdrew from the league and joined the International Hockey League.

== Regular season ==
Final standings

Note: GP = Games played; W = Wins; L = Losses; T = Ties; GF = Goals for; GA = Goals against; PTS = Points; y = clinched league title

Team	GP	W	L	T	Pts	GF	GA
y – Waterloo Black Hawks	30	19	11	0	38	156	126
Green Bay Bobcats	30	15	15	0	30	148	141
Rochester Mustangs	30	12	18	0	24	135	158
St. Paul Steers	18	8	10	0	16	71	85

Note: The reason for St. Paul playing only 18 games is uncertain.

== Clark Cup playoffs ==
Missing information

The Waterloo Black Hawks won the Clark Cup
