= 1972–73 USHL season =

- League: United States Hockey League
- Sport: Ice hockey
- Games: 45, 42
- Teams: 8

Regular season
- Season champions: Thunder Bay Twins

Clark Cup Playoffs
- Finals champions: Thunder Bay Twins

USHL seasons
- ← 1971–72 1973–74 →

The 1972–73 USHL season was the 12th season of the United States Hockey League as a senior league. The Thunder Bay Twins won the regular season championship and the Clark Cup as postseason champions.

== Member changes ==
- The Soo Canadians rebranded as the Sault Ste. Marie Greyhounds, taking the same name as multiple other current and former teams.
- The Calumet-Houghton Chiefs, Chicago Warriors and Sioux City Musketeers joined the league as expansion franchises.

== Regular season ==
Final standings

Note: GP = Games played; W = Wins; L = Losses; T = Ties; GF = Goals for; GA = Goals against; PTS = Points; y = clinched division title; z = clinched league title

=== Northern Conference ===
Team	GP	W	L	T	Pts	GF	GA
yz – Thunder Bay Twins	45	37	7	1	69	312	131
Marquette Iron Rangers	42	21	20	1	43	197	182
Sault Ste. Marie Greyhounds	42	13	28	1	27	166	211
Calumet-Houghton Chiefs	42	6	36	0	12	150	322

=== Southern Conference ===
Team	GP	W	L	T	Pts	GF	GA
y – Chicago Warriors	42	27	15	0	54	215	156
Green Bay Bobcats	42	25	15	2	52	217	168
Waterloo Black Hawks	42	23	18	1	47	217	189
Sioux City Musketeers	42	16	26	0	32	142	257

== Clark Cup playoffs ==
Missing information

The Thunder Bay Twins won the Clark Cup
