= Dan Justin =

American ice hockey player

- Born: February 12, 1955 (age 71) Palo Alto, CA, USA
- Height: 6 ft 1 in (185 cm)
- Weight: 180 lb (82 kg; 12 st 12 lb)
- Position: Defense
- Shot: Left
- Played for: WHA; Cincinnati Stingers; AHL; Springfield Indians
- NHL draft: Undrafted
- Playing career: 1975–1977

Daniel Sy Justin (born February 12, 1955) is an American former professional ice hockey defenseman.

Justin played 23 games in the World Hockey Association with the Cincinnati Stingers during the 1975–76 and 1976–77 seasons.

== Career statistics ==
=== Regular season and playoffs ===
			Regular season					Playoffs
Season	Team	League	GP	G	A	Pts	PIM	GP	G	A	Pts	PIM
1973–74	Long Island Cougars	NAHL	30	2	2	4	8	—	—	—	—	—
1974–75	Minnesota Junior Stars	MidJHL	39	16	22	38	27	—	—	—	—	—
1975–76	Cincinnati Stingers	WHA	17	0	0	0	2	—	—	—	—	—
1976–77	Springfield Indians	AHL	12	1	2	3	8	—	—	—	—	—
1976–77	Cincinnati Stingers	WHA	6	0	2	2	4	—	—	—	—	—
WHA totals			23	0	2	2	6	—	—	—	—	—
