= 1969–70 USHL season =

- League: United States Hockey League
- Sport: Ice hockey
- Games: 30
- Teams: 4

Regular season
- Season champions: Marquette Iron Rangers

Clark Cup Playoffs
- Finals champions: Marquette Iron Rangers

USHL seasons
- ← 1968–69 1970–71 →

The 1969–70 USHL season was the 9th season of the United States Hockey League as a senior league. The Marquette Iron Rangers won the regular season championship and the Clark Cup as postseason champions.

== Member changes ==
- The Waterloo Black Hawks withdrew from the league to serve as the Minnesota North Stars primary affiliate in the Central Hockey League for this season.
- The Grand Rapids Bruins folded.

== Regular season ==
Final standings

Note: GP = Games played; W = Wins; L = Losses; T = Ties; GF = Goals for; GA = Goals against; PTS = Points; y = clinched league title

Team	GP	W	L	T	Pts	GF	GA
y – Marquette Iron Rangers	30	24	5	1	49	146	79
Green Bay Bobcats	30	12	16	2	26	114	131
Soo Canadians	30	11	15	4	26	99	131
Rochester Mustangs	30	9	20	1	19	100	113

== Clark Cup playoffs ==
Missing information

The Marquette Iron Rangers won the Clark Cup
