= 1967–68 USHL season =

- League: United States Hockey League
- Sport: Ice hockey
- Games: 34
- Teams: 5

Regular season
- Season champions: Waterloo Black Hawks

Clark Cup Playoffs
- Finals champions: Waterloo Black Hawks

USHL seasons
- ← 1966–67 1968–69 →

The 1967–68 USHL season was the 7th season of the United States Hockey League as a senior league. The Waterloo Black Hawks won the regular season championship and the Clark Cup as postseason champions.

== Member changes ==
- The U.S. Nationals, a travelling team made up of players from the United States men's national ice hockey team, withdrew from the league. In their place, the Minnesota Nationals were formed. The new team was similar in makeup, however, they were full members of the USHL and played home games at rinks around Minnesota.

== Regular season ==
Final standings

Note: GP = Games played; W = Wins; L = Losses; T = Ties; GF = Goals for; GA = Goals against; PTS = Points; y = clinched league title

Team	GP	W	L	T	Pts	GF	GA
y – Waterloo Black Hawks	34	27	6	1	55	190	105
Marquette Iron Rangers	34	19	14	1	39	177	123
Green Bay Bobcats	34	14	19	1	29	144	145
Minnesota Nationals	34	9	24	1	19	75	107
Rochester Mustangs	34	8	24	2	18	112	206

== Clark Cup playoffs ==
Missing information

The Waterloo Black Hawks won the Clark Cup
