= Madison Blues (ice hockey) =

- City: Madison, Wisconsin
- League: USHL (1973–1974); CnHL (1974–1977)
- Operated: 1973–1977
- Home arena: Hartmeyer Ice Arena

Championships
- Regular season titles: 1975–76
- Division titles: 1973–74

The Madison Blues were an American semi-professional ice hockey team located in Madison, Wisconsin. The franchise was in operation for four seasons in the mid-1970s.

== History ==
The Blues began in 1973 as members of the United States Hockey League, then a senior circuit with teams spread across the midwest. Madison had a good first season, winning the northern division and losing in the league championship. After the year, the team transferred to the Continental Hockey League, a relatively new outfit that was more compact with clubs between Milwaukee and St. Louis. The Blues weren't quite as successful after the move but they soon recovered and won a regular season title in 1976.

The team was organized by Campbell Enterprises, Inc. and had a contract with the city of Madison to use the Hartmeyer Ice Arena as its home rink. Part of the agreement was that Campbell was required to make improvements to the building primarily by upgrading the facilities. The James W. Thomas Construction Co. was hired to begin the upgrades in October 1973 and finished in early 1974. Afterwards, Campbell did not pay Thomas the full amount charged, leading the construction company to sue both Campbell and the city of Madison. While the courts ultimately rules that the city was not at fault as it had not entered into any agreement with Thomas, Campbell was still required to pay for the work that had been completed. The case was decided in the summer of 1977 and shortly thereafter the team ceased to exist.

== Season-by-season record ==
Season	GP	W	L	T	Pts	GF	GA	Place	Playoffs
USHL
1973–74	48	32	14	0	66	276	189	1st in Northern	Runner-Up
CnHL
1974–75	25	14	10	1	35	192	124	3rd	Semifinals
1975–76	29	19	7	3	57	–	–	1st	Runner-Up
1976–77	32	17	12	3	37	239	185	2nd	None
