= 1966–67 USHL season =

- League: United States Hockey League
- Sport: Ice hockey
- Games: 32–24
- Teams: 5

Regular season
- Season champions: Waterloo Black Hawks

Clark Cup Playoffs
- Finals champions: Waterloo Black Hawks

USHL seasons
- ← 1965–66 1967–68 →

The 1966–67 USHL season was the 6th season of the United States Hockey League as a senior league. The Waterloo Black Hawks won the regular season championship and the Clark Cup as postseason champions.

== Member changes ==
- The St. Paul Steers and Fox Valley Astros folded.
- The USHL reached an agreement with the United States men's national ice hockey team and permitted them to join the league. The so-called U.S. Nationals played a partial travel schedule with all games counted in the standings, however, the national team would be ineligible for postseason play.

== Regular season ==
Final standings

Note: GP = Games played; W = Wins; L = Losses; T = Ties; GF = Goals for; GA = Goals against; PTS = Points; y = clinched league title

Team	GP	W	L	T	Pts	GF	GA
y – Waterloo Black Hawks	32	17	14	1	35	128	117
Green Bay Bobcats	30	14	13	3	31	133	123
Rochester Mustangs	30	12	14	4	28	112	130
Marquette Iron Rangers	30	10	18	2	22	115	132
U.S. Nationals	24	13	9	2	–	–	–

== Clark Cup playoffs ==
Missing information

The Waterloo Black Hawks won the Clark Cup
