= 1965–66 USHL season =

- League: United States Hockey League
- Sport: Ice hockey
- Games: 30–27
- Teams: 6

Regular season
- Season champions: Waterloo Black Hawks

Clark Cup Playoffs
- Finals champions: Waterloo Black Hawks

USHL seasons
- ← 1964–65 1966–67 →

The 1965–66 USHL season was the 5th season of the United States Hockey League as a senior league. The Waterloo Black Hawks won the regular season championship and the Clark Cup as postseason champions.

== Member changes ==
- The Fox Valley Astros joined as an expansion franchise.

== Regular season ==
Final standings

Note: GP = Games played; W = Wins; L = Losses; T = Ties; GF = Goals for; GA = Goals against; PTS = Points; y = clinched league title

Team	GP	W	L	T	Pts	GF	GA
y – Waterloo Black Hawks	30	21	9	0	42	182	132
Marquette Iron Rangers	29	17	12	0	34	155	122
St. Paul Steers	28	17	11	0	34	137	127
Rochester Mustangs	27	12	15	0	26	136	116
Green Bay Bobcats	30	12	18	0	24	138	160
Fox Valley Astros	30	8	22	0	16	127	217

== Clark Cup playoffs ==
Missing information

The Waterloo Black Hawks won the Clark Cup
