= 1962–63 USHL season =

- League: United States Hockey League
- Sport: Ice hockey
- Games: 32
- Teams: 5

Regular season
- Season champions: Green Bay Bobcats

Clark Cup Playoffs
- Finals champions: Green Bay Bobcats

USHL seasons
- ← 1961–62 1963–64 →

The 1962–63 USHL season was the 2nd season of the United States Hockey League as a senior league. The Green Bay Bobcats won the regular season championship and the Clark Cup as postseason champions.

== Member changes ==
- The Minneapolis Rebels folded.
- The St. Paul Steers and Waterloo Black Hawks joined the league as expansion franchises.

== Regular season ==
Final standings

Note: GP = Games played; W = Wins; L = Losses; T = Ties; GF = Goals for; GA = Goals against; PTS = Points; y = clinched league title

Team	GP	W	L	T	Pts	GF	GA
y – Green Bay Bobcats	32	25	7	0	50	201	128
Rochester Mustangs	32	20	12	0	40	180	134
Waterloo Black Hawks	32	16	16	0	32	147	156
St. Paul Steers	32	13	19	0	26	129	149
Des Moines Oak Leafs	32	6	26	0	12	120	210

== Clark Cup playoffs ==
Missing information

The Green Bay Bobcats won the Clark Cup
