= 1970–71 USHL season =

- League: United States Hockey League
- Sport: Ice hockey
- Games: 40
- Teams: 5

Regular season
- Season champions: Marquette Iron Rangers

Clark Cup Playoffs
- Finals champions: Marquette Iron Rangers

USHL seasons
- ← 1969–70 1971–72 →

The 1970–71 USHL season was the 10th season of the United States Hockey League as a senior league. The Marquette Iron Rangers won the regular season championship and the Clark Cup as postseason champions.

== Member changes ==
- The Waterloo Black Hawks returned to the league after a year spent as the Iowa Stars.
- The Rochester Mustangs folded.
- The Thunder Bay Twins, a team formed from the merger of the Port Arthur Bearcats and Fort William Beavers, transferred into the USHL from the Thunder Bay Senior A Hockey League.

== Regular season ==
Final standings

Note: GP = Games played; W = Wins; L = Losses; T = Ties; GF = Goals for; GA = Goals against; PTS = Points; y = clinched league title

=== Northern Conference ===
Team	GP	W	L	T	Pts	GF	GA
y – Marquette Iron Rangers	40	25	11	4	54	219	162
Waterloo Black Hawks	40	19	19	2	40	187	180
Thunder Bay Twins	40	19	20	1	39	222	194
Soo Canadians	40	19	21	0	38	168	191
Green Bay Bobcats	40	14	25	1	29	162	231

== Clark Cup playoffs ==
Missing information

The Marquette Iron Rangers won the Clark Cup
