= 1968–69 USHL season =

- League: United States Hockey League
- Sport: Ice hockey
- Games: 38–34
- Teams: 6*

Regular season
- Season champions: Marquette Iron Rangers

Clark Cup Playoffs
- Finals champions: Marquette Iron Rangers

USHL seasons
- ← 1967–68 1969–70 →

The 1968–69 USHL season was the 8th season of the United States Hockey League as a senior league. The Marquette Iron Rangers won the regular season championship and the Clark Cup as postseason champions.

== Member changes ==
- The Minnesota Nationals, the team used by players from the United States men's national ice hockey team to prepare for the 1968 Winter Olympics, withdrew from the league and dissolved.
- The USHL admitted the independent Soo Canadians to the league.
- The Duluth Port Stars joined the league as an expansion franchise.
- The Duluth Port Stars withdrew from the league on December 28th. Shortly thereafter, the Grand Rapids Bruins were formed to take their place in the league. The Bruins assumed the Stars' schedule, record and players for the remainder of the year.

== Regular season ==
Final standings

Note: GP = Games played; W = Wins; L = Losses; T = Ties; GF = Goals for; GA = Goals against; PTS = Points; y = clinched league title

Team	GP	W	L	T	Pts	GF	GA
y – Marquette Iron Rangers	38	31	7	0	62	–	–
Green Bay Bobcats	38	30	7	1	61	–	–
Waterloo Black Hawks	38	20	16	2	42	–	–
Rochester Mustangs	38	18	15	3	39	–	–
Soo Canadians	36	5	31	0	10	–	–
Grand Rapids Bruins	34	3	31	0	6	–	–
Duluth Port Stars*	0	0	0	0	0	–	–

* Duluth withdrew from the league on December 28th and was replaced by Grand Rapids.

== Clark Cup playoffs ==
Missing information

The Marquette Iron Rangers won the Clark Cup
