= Austin Mavericks =

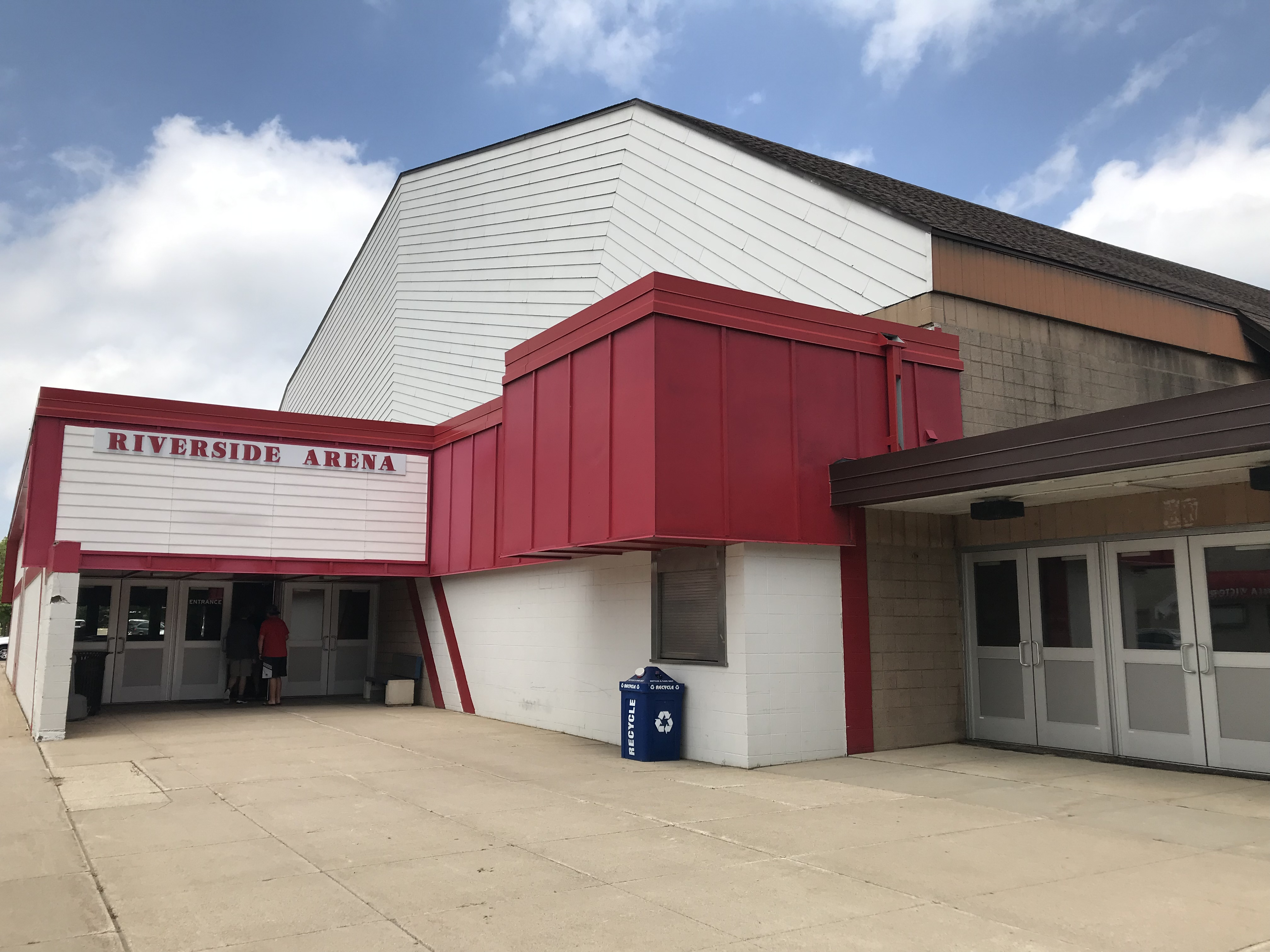
Riverside Arena

The Austin Mavericks are a defunct ice hockey team from Austin, Minnesota. Founded in 1974, they played in the Midwest Junior Hockey League from 1974 to 1977. Lou Vairo coached the Mavericks to two league championships and one national championship in 1976. The team joined the United States Hockey League in 1977, where it played until 1985. The franchise was relocated to become the Rochester Mustangs.
