= United States Hockey League =

Ice hockey league

- Current season, competition or edition: 2025–26 USHL season
- Sport: Ice hockey
- Founded: 1947; 79 years ago
- Commissioner: Glenn Hefferan
- No. of teams: 16
- Country: United States
- Most recent champion: Sioux Falls Stampede (4th title)
- Most titles: (Clark Cup era) Omaha Lancers (7) (overall) Waterloo Black Hawks (9)
- Broadcasters: FloSports; USAHockey.tv (USA NTDP home games only)
- Website: www.ushl.com

The United States Hockey League (USHL) is the top junior ice hockey league sanctioned by USA Hockey. The league consists of 16 active teams located in the Midwestern United States and Great Plains, for players between the ages of 16 and 21. The USHL is strictly amateur, allowing former players to compete in National Collegiate Athletic Association (NCAA) college hockey.

== Operations ==
The USHL is the country's top sanctioned junior hockey league, classified as Tier I. Like comparable entities such as the Canadian Hockey League's (CHL) three member leagues, the USHL offers a schedule of high-level, competitive games for top players aged 16 to 20.

Teams are subject to strict roster rules. In 2017–18 they may have no more than four overage skaters (players who have turned 20 in the first year of the season) and are limited to a maximum of five import players, three international players and two Canadian skaters. Starting in 2018–19, non-American goaltenders will count as two import players in a move designed to give more development time to American goalies, who are also exempt from the overage rule.

USHL teams, typically located in mid-sized cities, pay for all uniforms and equipment. Players live with local families, who receive a small stipend for food expenses, and either continue school or work part-time jobs. Due to their schedules, more than 90% of games are on weekends, which many NHL and college scouts attend. Average attendance at regular season games for the 2014–15 season was 2,715 with 1,384,820 fans attending games during the season.

Kyle Woodlief of Red Line Report stated in 2007 that the USHL's first line players are as good as their counterparts in the CHL—historically an important producer of NHL players—but that the Canadian-based league has better third and fourth lines. In 2006, Trevor Lewis, the 17th pick in the NHL entry draft, was the first USHL player to sign an NHL contract immediately after playing in the league.

At the conclusion of the 2014–15 regular season, the USHL has tallied 251 alumni that have played in the NHL and has 347 current players with NCAA college commitments. According to the league, approximately 95 percent of its players will eventually land a Division I college scholarship.

On March 18, 2020, the USHL cancelled the rest of 2019–20 season and playoffs as a result of the COVID-19 pandemic. The start of the following season was delayed to November 2020 and some teams had to suspend operations for the 2020–21 season.

== Draft ==
The USHL Draft is an annual event conducted in two "phases" during the second week of May. The first phase is an eight-round draft of U-17 players for the upcoming season. The second phase of the draft is open to all players eligible to play junior hockey who are not already protected by a USHL team. The number of players drafted varies, as each team will draft until they have filled the 45 spots available on their roster. Undrafted players are open to try out for any team as a try-out player. Each team must reduce their roster to 23 players for the start of the season, but may carry 18 additional players on an affiliate list.

== Teams ==
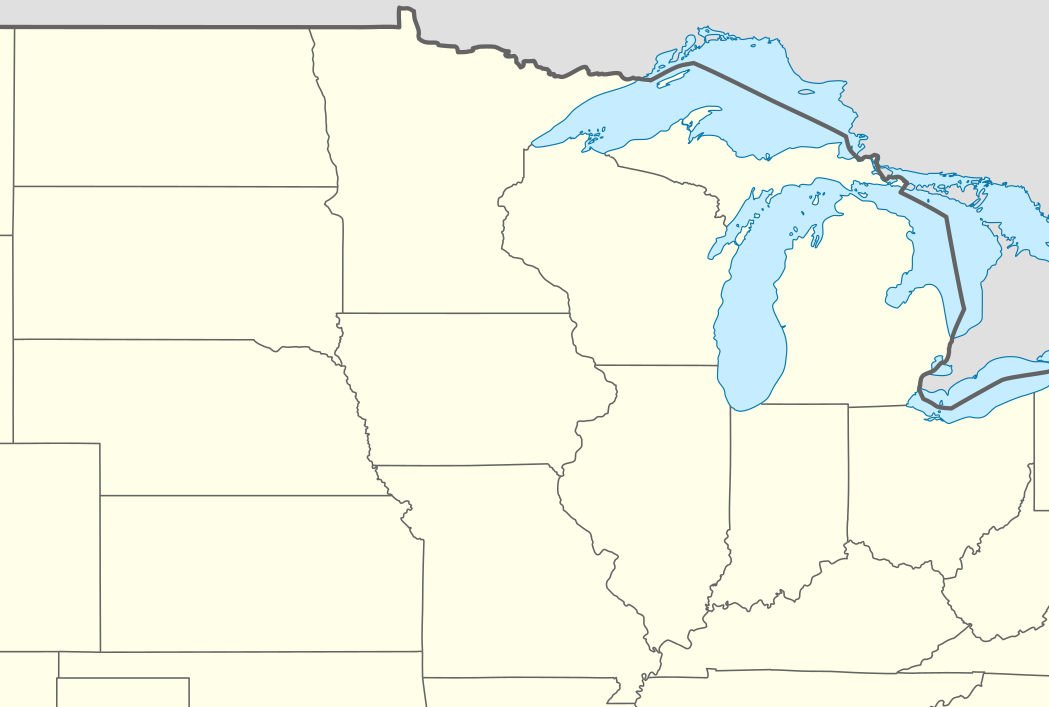
Current USHL team locations (Eastern Conference teams in red; Western Conference teams in blue)

=== Current teams ===
Eastern Conference
Team	Founded	Arena	Capacity	City
Cedar Rapids RoughRiders	1998	ImOn Ice Arena	4,000	Cedar Rapids, Iowa
Chicago Steel	2000	Blackhawks Ice Center	2,800	Chicago, Illinois
Dubuque Fighting Saints	2010	Mystique Ice Center	3,079	Dubuque, Iowa
Green Bay Gamblers	1994	Resch Center	8,709	Ashwaubenon, Wisconsin
Madison Capitols	2014	Wings Arena	3,000	DeForest, Wisconsin
Muskegon Lumberjacks	2010	Trinity Health Arena	5,100	Muskegon, Michigan
USA Hockey National Team Development Program	1996	USA Hockey Arena	3,504	Plymouth, Michigan
Youngstown Phantoms	2003	Covelli Centre	5,717	Youngstown, Ohio
Western Conference
Team	Founded	Arena	Capacity	City
Des Moines Buccaneers	1980	Mid American Energy Company RecPlex	2,000	West Des Moines, Iowa
Fargo Force	2008	Scheels Arena	4,000	Fargo, North Dakota
Lincoln Stars	1996	Ice Box	4,212	Lincoln, Nebraska
Omaha Lancers	1986	Liberty First Credit Union Arena	4,000	Ralston, Nebraska
Sioux City Musketeers	1972	Fleet Farm Arena	9,500 (Note: Expandable to 10,000)	Sioux City, Iowa
Sioux Falls Stampede	1999	Denny Sanford Premier Center	10,678	Sioux Falls, South Dakota
Tri-City Storm	2000	Viaero Center	4,047	Kearney, Nebraska
Waterloo Black Hawks	1962	Young Arena	3,500	Waterloo, Iowa

=== Future teams ===
On June 24, 2026, the league announced the addition of six new West Coast markets targeted to launch teams by the 2027-28 season, along with the owners of the teams.

Market	Owners
San Diego, California	Shawn Hicks and Joe Sakic
Orange County, California	John Moreland and Teemu Selanne
Simi Valley, California	Leorjay Sports
Northern California	Mark Heintz
Prescott Valley, Arizona	Justin Reynolds
Phoenix, Arizona	Ben Robert

=== Defunct professional teams ===
Team	City	Years
Anoka Nordiques	Anoka, Minnesota	1978–1979
Austin Mavericks	Austin, Minnesota	1977–1979
Bloomington Junior Stars	Bloomington, Minnesota	1977–1979
Calumet-Houghton Chiefs	Calumet Township, Michigan	1972–1973
Central Wisconsin Flyers	Stevens Point, Wisconsin	1974–1976
Chicago Warriors	Chicago, Illinois	1972–1975
Copper Country Chiefs	Calumet, Michigan	1974–1976
Copper Country Islanders	Calumet, Michigan	1973–1974
Des Moines Oak Leafs	Urbandale, Iowa	1968–1969
Duluth Port Stars	Duluth, Minnesota	1968 (Duluth dropped out of league on December 30, 1968)
Fox Valley Astros	Dundee, Illinois	1965–1966
Grand Rapids Blades	Grand Rapids, Michigan	1976–1977
Grand Rapids Bruins	Grand Rapids, Minnesota	1968–1969
Green Bay Bobcats	Ashwaubenon, Wisconsin	1961–1979
Madison Blues	Madison, Wisconsin	1973–1974 (transferred to CnHL)
Marquette Iron Rangers	Marquette, Michigan	1964–1976
Milwaukee Admirals	Milwaukee, Wisconsin	1973–1977 (transferred to IHL)
Milwaukee Metros	Milwaukee, Wisconsin	1961–1962 (Milwaukee folded Jan 16, 1962, due to financial trouble)
Minneapolis Rebels	Minneapolis, Minnesota	1961–1962
Minnesota Nationals	Saint Paul, Minnesota	1967–1968 (U.S. 1968 Olympic team)
Rochester Mustangs	Rochester, Minnesota	1961–1970
Sault Ste. Marie Canadians	Sault Ste. Marie, Ontario	1968–1972
Sault Ste. Marie Greyhounds	Sault Ste. Marie, Ontario	1972–1973
Sioux City Musketeers	Sioux City, Iowa	1972–1979
St. Paul Steers	Saint Paul, Minnesota	1962–1966
St. Paul Vulcans	Saint Paul, Minnesota	1977–1979
Thunder Bay Flyers	Thunder Bay, Ontario	1984–2000
Thunder Bay Twins	Thunder Bay, Ontario	1970–1975 (transferred to OHA)
Traverse City Bays	Traverse City, Michigan	1975–1977
U.S. Nationals	Saint Paul, Minnesota	1966–1967
Waterloo Black Hawks	Waterloo, Iowa	1962–1969, 1970–1979

== History ==
Precursors to this league were:

- American Amateur Hockey League (1947–52)
- Central Hockey League (1952–53)
- Minnesota Hockey League (1953–55)
- United States Central Hockey League (1955–61)

=== American Amateur Hockey League ===
The United States Hockey League was established as the American Amateur Hockey League in 1947 and began play for the 1947–48 season. When the league began operations it had five teams in and around the Twin Cities arena along with a team in Rochester. The league was made up three clubs from St. Paul which were 7-Up, Koppy's and Tally's, and two from Minneapolis, Jersey's and Bermans, along with a team from Rochester called the Rochester Mustangs. After the 1947–48 season the St. Paul Tally's dropped out of the league and left the five remaining members to make up the league for the 1948–49 and 1949–50 seasons. For the 1950–51 season the St. Paul 7-Up and St. Paul Koppy's merged and became St. Paul 7-Up/Koppy's. The Minneapolis Bermans dropped out of the league and new team called the Twin City Fords were added to give the American Amateur Hockey League four teams for 1950–51 season. The Rochester Mustangs were the only club to return for the fifth and final season of the American Amateur Hockey League in 1951–52. Gone were the St. Paul 7-Up/Koppy's, Twin City Fords and the Minneapolis Jerseys, replaced by the St. Paul Saints, Hibbing Flyers, Minneapolis Millers, Eveleth Rangers and the first club based outside of the state of Minnesota, the Sioux City Iowa Sunhawks, which gave the league six clubs for 1951–52, its final season as the American Amateur Hockey League.

=== Central Hockey League ===
The American Amateur Hockey League was renamed the Central Hockey League for the 1952–53 season. Only five of the clubs who had made up the American Amateur Hockey League for 1951–52 season returned. Those clubs were the Rochester Mustangs, St. Paul Saints, Minneapolis Millers, Hibbing Flyers and the now called Eveleth-Virginia Rangers. Gone were the Sioux City Sunhawks.

=== Minnesota Hockey League ===
After a year as the Central Hockey League the league was renamed the Minnesota Hockey League and would be called this for the 1953–54 and 1954–55 seasons. Only two teams who had made up the Central Hockey League returned to make up the Minnesota Hockey League for the 1953–54 season. Those teams were the Rochester Mustangs and the Hibbing Flyers. Gone were the St. Paul Saints, Minneapolis Millers and the Eveleth-Virginia Rangers. The Grand Forks Red Wings were added and this gave the league three teams for 1953–54 season. The Rochester Mustangs were the only team to return for the second and final season of the Minnesota Hockey League. Gone were Hibbing and Grand Forks. The league added two teams in Minneapolis called the Culbersons and Bungalows and a new team in St. Paul, again called the Saints, to give the league four teams for 1954–55.

=== United States Central Hockey League ===
After two seasons as the Minnesota Hockey League the league became the United States Central Hockey League and would be called this for five years, 1956 to 1960. Only three of the four teams who had made up the Minnesota Hockey League for the 1954–55 season returned. Those teams were the Rochester Mustangs along with both Minneapolis clubs, the Culbersons and the Bungalows. Gone were the St. Paul Saints who replaced by a team called the St. Paul Peters. These four clubs would make up the USCHL for the 1955–56 and 1956–57 seasons. For the 1957–58 season the St Paul Peters were replaced by a team called St. Paul K.S.T.P. The Rochester Mustangs were the only team to return for the 1958–59 season. Gone were St. Paul K.S.T.P. along with both Minneapolis clubs (the Culbersons and the Bungalows). The league returned to four teams when it replaced these clubs with the St. Paul Capitols, Minneapolis Millers and the Des Moines Ice Hawks, marking the league's return to Iowa. For the fifth and final season of the USCHL the St Paul Capitols dropped out and the league expanded to five teams and into new territory with a team in Michigan with the addition of the Marquette Sentinels and into Wisconsin with the addition of the Green Bay Bobcats.

==== 1961–79 ====
The United States Hockey League (USHL) operated as a senior ice hockey league from 1961 to 1979.

The USHL welcomed the first female professional hockey player in 1969–70, when the Marquette Iron Rangers signed Karen Koch.

By the late 1970s, the USHL had fallen on hard times. In the summer of 1977, clubs from the recently folded Midwest Junior Hockey League contacted the USHL. A unique merger was formed, with the three junior teams (Bloomington Junior Stars, Austin Mavericks, St. Paul Vulcans) and three remaining pro teams (Sioux City Musketeers, Waterloo Black Hawks, Green Bay Bobcats) gathered under the USHL banner. League governors decided on a two-division format, with the junior-aged teams in the Midwest Division and the professionals in the U.S. Division. The teams played an interlocking schedule that was, predictably, dominated by the professionals. The USHL's split existence would last just two seasons. The minor-pro wing of the league folded following the 1978–79 season, providing junior hockey operators with the opportunity to redefine the circuit. The 1979–80 season was the league's first as an entirely junior arrangement.

The league's last season as a senior hockey league was 1978–79. During this final season the league comprised seven teams in two conferences. The U.S. Conference (with the Green Bay Bobcats, the Sioux City Musketeers and the Waterloo Black Hawks); while the Midwest Conference (with the Anoka Nordiques, the Austin Mavericks, the Bloomington Junior Stars and the St. Paul Vulcans). All seven teams were made up with players categorized as "Senior Amateur". Following the 1978–79 season the senior league teams in the U.S. Conference folded and the USHL became an all-junior league the following season.

== Awards ==
=== Semi-Pro Champions ===
Championships from the semi-pro era of the USHL.

Year	Team
1961–62	Rochester Mustangs
1962–63	Green Bay Bobcats
1963–64	Waterloo Black Hawks
1964–65	Waterloo Black Hawks
1965–66	Waterloo Black Hawks
1966–67	Waterloo Black Hawks
1967–68	Waterloo Black Hawks
1968–69	Marquette Iron Rangers
1969–70	Marquette Iron Rangers
1970–71	Marquette Iron Rangers
1971–72	Green Bay Bobcats
1972–73	Thunder Bay Twins
1973–74	Thunder Bay Twins
1974–75	Waterloo Black Hawks
1975–76	Milwaukee Admirals
1976–77	Grand Rapids Blades
1977–78	Waterloo Black Hawks
1978–79	Waterloo Black Hawks

=== Anderson Cup Champions ===
Regular season champions from junior era of the USHL.

Year	Team
1979–80	Hennepin Nordiques
1980–81	Dubuque Fighting Saints
1981–82	Sioux City Musketeers
1982–83	Dubuque Fighting Saints
1983–84	St. Paul Vulcans
1984–85	Austin Mavericks
1985–86	Sioux City Musketeers
1986–87	Rochester Mustangs
1987–88	Thunder Bay Flyers
1988–89	Thunder Bay Flyers
1989–90	Omaha Lancers
1990–91	Thunder Bay Flyers
1991–92	Thunder Bay Flyers
1992–93	Omaha Lancers
1993–94	Des Moines Buccaneers
1994–95	Des Moines Buccaneers
1995–96	Green Bay Gamblers
1996–97	Green Bay Gamblers
1997–98	Des Moines Buccaneers
1998–99	Des Moines Buccaneers
1999–2000	Lincoln Stars
2000–01	Lincoln Stars
2001–02	Omaha Lancers
2002–03	Lincoln Stars
2003–04	Tri-City Storm
2004–05	Cedar Rapids RoughRiders and Omaha Lancers (tie)
2005–06	Sioux Falls Stampede
2006–07	Waterloo Black Hawks
2007–08	Omaha Lancers
2008–09	Green Bay Gamblers
2009–10	Green Bay Gamblers
2010–11	Cedar Rapids RoughRiders
2011–12	Green Bay Gamblers
2012–13	Dubuque Fighting Saints
2013–14	Waterloo Black Hawks
2014–15	Youngstown Phantoms
2015–16	Cedar Rapids Roughriders
2016–17	Sioux City Musketeers
2017–18	Waterloo Black Hawks
2018–19	Tri-City Storm
2019–20	Chicago Steel
2020–21	Chicago Steel
2021–22	Tri-City Storm
2022–23	Fargo Force
2023–24	Fargo Force
2024–25	Lincoln Stars
2025–26	Youngstown Phantoms

=== Clark Cup Champions ===
Playoff champions from the junior era of the USHL.

Year	Team
1980	Hennepin Nordiques
1981	Dubuque Fighting Saints
1982	Sioux City Musketeers
1983	Dubuque Fighting Saints
1984	St. Paul Vulcans
1985	Dubuque Fighting Saints
1986	Sioux City Musketeers
1987	Rochester Mustangs
1988	Thunder Bay Flyers
1989	Thunder Bay Flyers
1990	Omaha Lancers
1991	Omaha Lancers
1992	Des Moines Buccaneers
1993	Omaha Lancers
1994	Omaha Lancers
1995	Des Moines Buccaneers
1996	Green Bay Gamblers
1997	Lincoln Stars
1998	Omaha Lancers
1999	Des Moines Buccaneers
2000	Green Bay Gamblers
2001	Omaha Lancers
2002	Sioux City Musketeers
2003	Lincoln Stars
2004	Waterloo Black Hawks
2005	Cedar Rapids RoughRiders
2006	Des Moines Buccaneers
2007	Sioux Falls Stampede
2008	Omaha Lancers
2009	Indiana Ice
2010	Green Bay Gamblers
2011	Dubuque Fighting Saints
2012	Green Bay Gamblers
2013	Dubuque Fighting Saints
2014	Indiana Ice
2015	Sioux Falls Stampede
2016	Tri-City Storm
2017	Chicago Steel
2018	Fargo Force
2019	Sioux Falls Stampede
2020	Clark Cup not awarded
2021	Chicago Steel
2022	Sioux City Musketeers
2023	Youngstown Phantoms
2024	Fargo Force
2025	Muskegon Lumberjacks
2026	Sioux Falls Stampede

== Alumni ==
- List of USHL alumni to play in the NHL
- List of USHL players drafted by NHL teams

== League records ==
=== Team ===
- Most points in a season – 102 by Fargo Force in 2023–24 season.
- Most wins in a season – 50 by Fargo Force in 2023–24 season.
- Most losses in a season – 55 by Omaha Lancers in 2024–25 season.
- Most road wins in a season – 25 by Green Bay Gamblers in 2011–12 season.
- Longest winning streak – 19 by Des Moines Buccaneers between November 1, 1998 and January 6, 1999.

=== Individual ===
- Most points in a season – 135 by Tim Ferguson of Sioux City Musketeers in 1985–86 season.
- Most goals in a season – 67 by Rod Taylor of Sioux City Musketeers in 1986–87 season.
- Most assists in a season – 79 by Tim Ferguson of Sioux City Musketeers in 1985–86 season.
- Most PIMs in a season – 316 by Chad Stauffacher of Green Bay Gamblers in 1996–97 season.

== See also ==
- List of USHL seasons
- List of ice hockey leagues
- List of sports attendance figures
