= Calumet-Houghton Chiefs =

The Calumet-Houghton Chiefs were a minor pro ice hockey team based in Calumet, Michigan. They played in the United States Hockey League during the 1972-73 season. The team was renamed the Copper Country Islanders for the 1973-74 season, and operated as the Copper Country Chiefs for two seasons from 1974 to 1976.
