= Sioux City Musketeers =

Junior ice hockey team in Sioux City, Iowa

- City: Sioux City, Iowa
- League: USHL
- Conference: Western
- Founded: 1972
- Home arena: Tyson Events Center
- Colors: Green, gold
- General manager: Sean Clark
- Head coach: Jason Kersner

Franchise history
- 1972–present: Sioux City Musketeers

Championships
- Regular season titles: 3 Anderson Cups (1981–82, 1985–86, and 2016–17)
- Playoff championships: 4 Clark Cups (1982, 1986, 2002, and 2022)

The Sioux City Musketeers are a junior ice hockey team based in Sioux City, Iowa. The Musketeers play their home games at Tyson Events Center, and are members of the Western Conference of the United States Hockey League (USHL). The team was founded in 1972, and has won three Anderson Cups as the regular season champion, and four Clark Cups as the playoffs champion of the USHL.

== History ==
The first head coach and general manager of the Sioux City Musketeers was Rich Blanche.

Dave Siciliano served as head coach and general manager of the Musketeers from 2000 to 2008. Sioux City radio station KOOL 99.5 broadcast The Dave Siciliano Show on Mondays during the season, which included interviews with the coach and the team's players. He promised that his team would be in better physical condition and to outwork their opponents.

In the 2001–02 season playoffs, the Musketeers defeated the Sioux Falls Stampede in three consecutive games in the first round, defeated the Green Bay Gamblers in four games in the second round, then defeated the Omaha Lancers three games to two in the playoffs finals to win the Clark Cup. At the start of the season, Siciliano had not expected to reach the finals nor win the cup, but credited the team for being tight-knit and "just great quality kids" who handled adversity. During the fifth game of the finals, the Musketeers trailed by a 3–1 score in the third period, then tied up the game in the final six minutes and won in overtime. In a 2008 interview, Siciliano recalled that the Clark Cup victory in 2002 was his fondest memory with the team.

In the 2004–05 season playoffs, the Musketeers won the first round by three games to one versus the Lincoln Stars, and won the second round by three games to one versus the Tri-City Storm. The Cedar Rapids RoughRiders won the Clark Cup in the fifth and deciding game by a 4–1 score. Siciliano credited his team for not quitting despite the strong play of opposing goaltender Alex Stalock.

When Siciliano resigned in 2008, he had the second most career victories for a coach in the USHL, and had the most wins for a Musketeers coach with 272 victories. He stated that he was proud of designing the team's circular dressing room at the Gateway Arena so that one could "look your teammates directly in the eye"; and was credited by the Sioux City Journal for having "etched a distinct signature on Musketeer ice success for eight seasons".

In August 2014, the Musketeers captured a Bronze Medal as the USHL representative at the Junior Club World Cup in Ufa, Russia. 2014–15 team captain Neal Pionk was named the tournament's best defenseman, while Adam Johnson led the tournament in scoring, with 9 points in 5 games. Both were named to the All-Tournament team. Pionk went on to win the 2014–15 USHL Defenseman of the Year. Both Pionk and Johnson were named to the 2014–15 All-USHL First Team. Ryan Zuhlsdorf was named to the USHL All-Rookie First Team, while Bobo Carpenter earned All-Rookie Second Team honors.

== Players ==
=== NHL alumni ===
The Musketeers have had 40 players reach the National Hockey League (NHL). John Grahame (G), Brock Boeser (F), Billy Tibbetts (F), David Hale (D), Rostislav Klesla (D), Ruslan Fedotenko (F), John Zeiler (F), Sam Gagner (F), Chris Butler (D), Dieter Kochan (G), Max Pacioretty (F), Tim Kennedy (F), Corey Elkins (F), Stephane Da Costa (F), Steven Kampfer (D), Patrick Davis (F), Sean Collins (D), Travis Turnbull (F), Danny DeKeyser (D), Max McCormick (F), Ryan Carpenter (F), Kevin Gravel (D), Jake Guentzel (C), Neal Pionk (D), Seth Helgeson (D), Jeff Zatkoff (G), Michael Kapla (D), Eeli Tolvanen (F), Joel L'Esperance (F), Kyle Criscuolo (F), Adam Johnson (F), Jordan Schmaltz (D), Matiss Kivlenieks (G), Alex Steeves (F), Walker Duehr (F), Akira Schmid (G), Bobby Brink (F), Cole Koepke (F), Joe Snively (F) and Martin Pospisil (F).

=== NHL-drafted players ===
Over 50 Sioux City Musketeer players have been selected by teams in the annual NHL Draft, including two members of the 2006–07 team (Max Pacioretty-1st Rd., Phil DeSimone-3rd Rd.) at the 2007 NHL draft. Selected in the 2008 NHL draft, Steve Quailer (F)-3rd Rd. 86th overall pick, and a member of the 2007–08 team. In the 2009 NHL draft, Seth Helgeson (D) was selected in the 4th round. Helgeson played two years in Sioux City ('07–'09). In the 2011 NHL draft, Max McCormick (F)was selected in the 6th round. McCormick won the "7th Man" award as a member of the 2010–11 Musketeers. In the 2012 NHL draft, Cliff Watson (D) was selected in the 6th round. In the 2013 NHL draft, 3 Musketeers were selected, including 2012–13 USHL Rookie of the Year, Jake Guentzel (F)-3rd Rd. Blake Heinrich (D) and Avery Peterson (F) were picked in the 5th and 6th Rd. respectively. In the 2015 NHL draft, Ryan Zuhlsdorf (D) was selected in the 5th Rd.

== Season-by-season record ==
The Sioux City Musketeers operated within the USHL as a senior ice hockey team 1972 to 1979.

Season	GP	W	L	T	OTL	SOL	GF	GA	Pts	Result	Playoffs
1972–73	42	16	26	0	—	—	142	257	32	4th, Southern	did not qualify
1973–74	48	23	24	1	—	—	215	245	47	4th, Southern	did not qualify
1974–75	48	28	19	1	—	—	300	236	57	2nd, Southern	Lost div. finals, 1–2 vs. Waterloo Black Hawks
1975–76	48	31	16	1	—	—	312	233	63	1st, Southern	Lost first round series, 0–2 vs. Milwaukee Admirals
1976–77	48	22	26	0	—	—	265	246	44	2nd, Southern	Lost semifinals, 2–3 vs. Grand Rapids Blades
1977–78	51	34	17	0	—	—	288	222	68	T-1st, U.S.	Won semifinals, 4–1 vs. Green Bay Bobcats; Lost championships, 3–4 vs. Waterloo Black Hawks
1978–79	49	24	25	0	—	—	280	271	48	3rd, U.S.	Won quarterfinals, 3–1 vs. Austin Mavericks; Won semifinals, 3–1 vs. Green Bay Bobcats; Lost championships, 1–3 vs. Waterloo Black Hawks
1979–80	48	20	24	4	—	—	256	267	44	3rd, South	Lost first round series, 1–2 vs. Waterloo Black Hawks
1980–81	48	12	36	0	—	—	200	308	24	4th, South	did not qualify
1981–82	48	29	16	3	—	—	281	226	61	1st, USHL; Anderson Cup	3–2 in Clark Cup round-robin; (L, 2–5 vs. Des Moines; L, 3–7 vs. Austin; W, 7–2 vs. Dubuque; W, 9–3 vs. Bloomington; W, 8–2 vs. St. Paul); Won Clark Cup finals, 3–2 vs. Des Moines Buccaneers
1982–83	48	34	14	0	—	—	271	199	68	2nd, USHL	Won quarterfinals, 3–1, vs. St. Paul Vulcans; Won semifinals, 3–1 vs. Des Moines Buccaneers; Lost Clark Cup finals, 0–2 vs. Dubuque Fighting Saints
1983–84	48	32	11	2	3	—	305	204	69	3rd, USHL	Won quarterfinals, 1–0 vs. Bloomington Junior Stars (Note: Bloomington forfeited game two and did not travel to Sioux City); Won semifinals, 3–1 vs. Austin Mavericks; Lost Clark Cup finals, 3–4 vs. St. Paul Vulcans
1984–85	48	27	14	1	6	—	268	209	61	5th, USHL	Lost quarterfinal, 1–3 vs. St. Paul Vulcans
1985–86	48	42	6	0	0	—	358	184	84	1st, USHL; Anderson Cup	Won quarterfinals, 3–0 vs. Thunder Bay Flyers; Won semifinals, 3–1 vs. Dubuque Fighting Saints; Won Clark Cup finals, 3–0 vs. Rochester Mustangs
1986–87	48	23	23	1	1	—	256	236	48	7th, USHL	Lost quarterfinals, 0–3 vs. Thunder Bay Flyers
1987–88	48	23	22	0	3	—	275	281	49	6th, USHL	Lost quarterfinals, 0–3 vs. Rochester Mustangs
1988–89	48	17	28	1	2	—	248	273	37	7th, USHL	Lost quarterfinals, 0–3 vs, St. Paul Vulcans
1989–90	48	29	16	1	2	—	240	187	61	4th, USHL	Lost quarterfinals, 0–3 vs. Madison Capitols
1990–91	48	9	37	1	1	—	166	326	20	10th, USHL	did not qualify
1991–92	48	19	26	1	2	—	217	256	41	7th, USHL	Lost quarterfinals, 0–3 vs. Des Moines Buccaneers
1992–93	48	15	25	4	4	—	212	237	38	8th, USHL	Lost quarterfinals, 1–3 vs. Omaha Lancers
1993–94	48	27	14	1	6	—	209	173	61	T-4th, USHL	Won quarterfinals, 4–2 vs. Dubuque Fighting Saints; Lost semifinals, 0–3 vs. Omaha Lancers; Won USHL third place Gold Cup qualifier series, 2–0 vs. St. Paul Vulcans
1994–95	48	26	15	4	3	—	230	188	59	4th, USHL	Won quarterfinals, 4–2 vs. Thunder Bay Flyers; Lost semifinals, 1–3 vs. Omaha Lancers; Lost USHL third place Gold Cup qualifier series, 1–2 vs. Dubuque Fighting Saints
1995–96	46	17	24	1	4	—	150	190	39	9th, USHL	Won quarterfinals, 4–1 vs. Waterloo Black Hawks; Lost semifinals, 0–4 vs. Green Bay Gamblers
1996–97	54	9	43	—	2	—	162	307	20	6th, South	did not qualify
1997–98	56	32	21	—	3	—	195	155	67	4th, South	Lost quarterfinals, 1–4 vs. Lincoln Stars
1998–99	56	34	19	—	3	—	196	148	71	2nd, West	Lost quarterfinals, 2–3 vs. Lincoln Stars
1999–00	58	27	26	—	—	5	170	162	59	6th, West	Lost quarterfinals, 2–3 vs. Lincoln Stars
2000–01	56	27	22	—	7	—	174	194	61	6th, West	Lost quarterfinals, 0–3 vs. Lincoln Stars
2001–02	61	41	16	—	4	—	237	162	86	3rd, West	Won quarterfinals, 3–0 vs. Sioux Falls Stampede; Won semifinals, 3–1 vs. Green Bay Gamblers; Won Clark Cup finals, 3–2 vs. Omaha Lancers
2002–03	60	36	18	—	4	2	210	186	78	3rd, West	Lost quarterfinals, 1–3 vs. River City Lancers
2003–04	60	38	15	—	2	5	192	152	83	2nd, West	Won quarterfinals, 3–0 vs. River City Lancers; Lost semifinals, 1–3 vs. Tri-City Storm
2004–05	60	37	17	—	1	5	222	173	80	2nd, West	Won quarterfinals, 3–1 vs. Lincoln Stars; Won semifinals, 3–1 vs. Tri-City Storm; Lost Clark Cup finals, 2–3 vs. Cedar Rapids RoughRiders
2005–06	60	28	26	—	3	3	182	216	62	5th, West	did not qualify
2006–07	60	34	21	—	1	4	219	178	73	T-4th, West	Lost qualifying round, 3–4 vs. Tri-City Storm
2007–08	60	32	25	—	2	1	194	185	67	4th, West	Lost quarterfinals, 1–3 vs. Omaha Lancers
2008–09	60	24	30	—	4	2	194	210	54	5th, West	did not qualify
2009–10	60	27	24	—	3	6	172	189	63	5th, West	did not qualify
2010–11	60	31	23	—	4	2	174	164	68	6th of 8, West; 10th of 16, USHL	Lost qualifying round, 1–2 vs. Sioux Falls Stampede
2011–12	60	29	30	—	0	1	181	189	59	5th of 8, West; 10th of 16, USHL	Lost qualifying round, 0–2 vs. Fargo Force
2012–13	64	23	30	—	3	8	196	200	57	6th of 8, West; 12th of 16, USHL	did not qualify
2013–14	60	38	19	—	3	0	202	157	79	3rd of 8, West; 4th of 16, USHL	Won Conf. Semifinals, 3–1 vs. Omaha Lancers; Lost Conf. Finals, 1–3 vs. Waterloo Black Hawks
2014–15	60	38	17	—	1	4	225	170	81	1st of 8, West; 2nd of 16, USHL	Lost Conf. Semifinals, 2–3 vs. Sioux Falls Stampede
2015–16	60	20	39	—	1	0	148	210	41	8th of 8, Western; 17th of 17, USHL	did not qualify
2016–17	60	40	13	—	5	2	179	125	87	1st of 8, Western; 1st of 17, USHL; Anderson Cup	Won Conf. Semifinals, 3–0 vs. Des Moines Buccaneers; Won Conf. Finals, 3–2 vs. Waterloo Black Hawks; Lost Clark Cup finals, 2–3 vs. Chicago Steel
2017–18	60	26	26	—	4	4	159	197	60	7th of 8, Western; 14th of 17, USHL	did not qualify
2018–19	62	30	25	—	5	2	187	197	67	6th of 8, Western; 11th of 17, USHL	Lost First Round, 0–2 vs. Sioux Falls Stampede
2019–20	48	16	24	—	7	1	137	170	40	8th of 8, Western; 15th of 16, USHL	Season cancelled
2020–21	53	31	21	—	1	0	160	125	63	3rd of 8, Western; 6th of 14, USHL	Won Conf. Semifinals, 2–0 vs. Omaha Lancers; Lost Conf. Finals, 0–2 vs. Fargo Force
2021–22	62	41	16	—	4	1	238	169	87	2nd of 8, Western; 3rd of 16, USHL	Won Conf. Semifinals, 2–1 vs. Waterloo Black Hawks; Won Conf. Finals, 3–0 vs. Tri-City Storm; Won Clark Cup finals, 3–1 vs. Madison Capitols

=== Gold Cup tournament ===
The Gold Cup was the USA Hockey Junior A National Championship that the USHL participated in at the end of the season against the regular season and playoff champions of the other Junior A leagues. The USHL stopped participation in the tournament after USA Hockey realigned its designations and the USHL became a Tier I league in 2001. The Gold Cup was discontinued after the 2003 tournament when the remaining Tier II Junior A leagues merged. Sioux City participated in several Gold Cup tournaments, but only won in 1986.

Year	Round-Robin	Record	Semifinal Game	Championship Game
1982	L, 2–4 vs. Paddock Pools Saints (GLJHL); W, 1–0 vs. Redford Royals (GLJHL); W, 7–4 vs. Chicago Jets (CJHL)		Not played	L, 4–5 vs. Paddock Pools Saints (GLJHL)
1983	L, 6–8 vs. Dubuque Fighting Saints (USHL); T, 6–6 vs. Chicago Jets (CJHL); W, 10–3 vs. Lowell Chiefs (CMJL); W, 4–1 vs. Paddock Pools Saints (GLJHL)	2–1–1	Not played	L, 2–3 vs. Dubuque Fighting Saints (USHL)
1984	L, 5–7 vs. Fraser Flags (NAHL); W, 11–8 vs. Lowell Chiefs (MJHL); L, 2–3 vs. St. Paul Vulcans (USHL)	1–2–0	did not advance	
1986	W, 7–3 vs. Chicago Cougars (NAHL); T, 5–5 vs. St. Clair Shores Falcons (NAHL); W, 8–5 vs. Rochester Mustangs (USHL)	2–0–1	Not played	W, 5–4 vs. St. Clair Shores Falcons (NAHL); Won Gold Cup
1994	L, 3–6 vs. Detroit Compuware (NAHL); W, 4–2 vs. Niagara Scenic (NAHL); W, 7–3 vs. Kalamazoo Jr. Wings (NAHL)	2–1–0	W, 7–2 vs. Niagara Scenic (NAHL)	L, 5–7 vs. Detroit Compuware (NAHL)
1996 As Host	W, 6–2 vs. Springfield Jr. Blues (NAHL); W, 8–6 vs. Billings Bulls (AFHL); W, 7–3 vs. Detroit Compuware (NAHL)	3–0–0	W, 3–1 vs. Rochester Mustangs (USHL)	L, 2–6 vs. Green Bay Gamblers (USHL)

== Team records ==
- Most points, season: 87 (2016–17)
- Fewest points, season: 20 (1996–97)
- Most wins, season: 42 (1985–86)
- Fewest wins, season: 9 (1996–97)
- Most losses, season: 45 (1996–97)
- Fewest losses, season: 6 (1985–86)
- Most goals scored, season: 358 (1985–86)
- Fewest goals against, season: 125 (2016–17)
- Most penalty minutes, season: 1,905 (1997–98)
- Longest winning streak: 16 (1985-10-19–1985-12-14)
- Longest losing streak: 12 (1979–80)
- Longest home winning streak: 22 (1985-10-05–1986-02-15)
- Longest Road winning streak: 6 (1985–86; 2006–07)
- Longest home losing streak: 12 (1996–97)
- Longest road losing streak: 14 (1996–97)
- Single-game attendance record: 6,309 (2017-05-23 Clark Cup final game five vs. Chicago Steel)
- Single-season attendance record: 82,102 (2006–07)
