= Marquette Iron Rangers =

US semi pro hockey team

The Marquette Iron Rangers were a semi-pro team that played in the United States Hockey League from 1964-1976 and were five-time champions (three league and two playoffs). The team played the majority of their home games at the Palestra in Marquette, Michigan.

The Marquette Iron Rangers made ice hockey history when they signed the female goalie phenomenon Karen Koch to a professional contract in 1969. By doing so, Koch became the first woman to play professional hockey in North America, if not the world. The 1973–1974 team featured the Carlson Brothers. Jack Carlson went on to play in the NHL and WHA, while his brothers Steve Carlson and Jeff Carlson became famous for starring as the Hanson Brothers in the movie Slap Shot. Steve also played in the NHL and WHA, while Jeff played in the WHA.

In their second incarnation, the Iron Rangers were an amateur senior ice hockey team from Marquette that played in the Great Lakes Hockey League at Lakeview Arena. After one season, the team changed names to the Marquette Mutineers after running into ownership-related problems.
