= 2023–24 USHL season =

45th season of the USHL

- League: United States Hockey League
- Sport: Ice hockey
- Duration: Regular season September – April; Postseason; April – May
- Games: 62
- Teams: 16

Draft
- Top draft pick: Charlie Cerrato
- Picked by: Youngstown Phantoms

Regular season
- Anderson Cup: Fargo Force
- Season MVP: Mac Swanson (Fargo Force)
- Top scorer: Matvei Gridin (Muskegon Lumberjacks)

Clark Cup Playoffs
- Clark Cup Playoffs MVP: Mac Swanson (Force)
- Finals champions: Fargo Force
- Runners-up: Dubuque Fighting Saints

USHL seasons
- ← 2022–23 2024–25 →

The 2023–24 USHL season was the 45th season of the United States Hockey League as an all-junior league. The regular season ran from September 20, 2023, to April 13, 2024, with a 62-game schedule for each team. The Western Conference champions Fargo Force were awarded the Anderson Cup for the second consecutive year and went on to win the Clark Cup Championship.

== Season highlights ==
Total fan attendance at regular season games was calculated at 1,122,616, compared to 1,116,004 in 2022–23. The Sioux Falls Stampede set a South Dakota state attendance record for a hockey game with 11,025 attending its 11 February match against the Sioux City Musketeers. The league also reported a 37 percent increase in streaming viewership.

49 players with ties to the USHL, including 43 who played at least one game during the 2023–24 USHL season, were selected in the 2024 NHL entry draft. Those included Macklin Celebrini, former Chicago Steel forward, and Artyom Levshunov, former Green Bay Gamblers defenseman, who were selected first and second overall, respectively.

== Regular season ==
The standings at the end of the regular season were as follows:

Note: x = clinched playoff berth; y = clinched conference title; z = clinched regular season title

=== Eastern Conference ===
Team	GP	W	L	OTL	SOL	Pts	GF	GA
y – Dubuque Fighting Saints	62	41	13	3	5	90	271	195
x – Muskegon Lumberjacks	62	38	22	1	1	78	254	224
x – Green Bay Gamblers	62	34	18	7	3	78	233	214
x – Youngstown Phantoms	62	33	19	6	4	76	230	206
x – Madison Capitols	62	33	23	4	2	72	218	192
x – Chicago Steel	62	27	28	3	4	61	209	256
Cedar Rapids RoughRiders	62	25	30	5	2	57	179	230
Team USA	62	22	35	2	3	49	229	278

=== Western Conference ===
Team	GP	W	L	OTL	SOL	Pts	GF	GA
z – Fargo Force	62	50	10	2	0	102	272	143
x – Sioux City Musketeers	62	34	22	6	0	74	229	207
x – Waterloo Black Hawks	62	35	25	0	2	72	224	205
x – Tri-City Storm	62	28	23	4	7	67	232	218
x – Sioux Falls Stampede	62	28	28	5	1	62	219	250
x – Lincoln Stars	62	27	30	3	2	59	169	216
Des Moines Buccaneers	62	25	30	5	2	57	185	209
Omaha Lancers	62	16	43	3	0	35	160	270

== Statistics ==
=== Scoring leaders ===
The following players led the league in regular season points at the completion of games played on April 13, 2024.

Player	Team	GP	G	A	Pts	PIM
Matvei Gridin	Muskegon Lumberjacks	60	38	45	83	51
Trevor Connelly	Tri-City Storm	52	31	47	78	88
Mac Swanson	Fargo Force	55	26	51	77	6
Michael Hage	Chicago Steel	54	33	42	75	53
Noah Powell	Dubuque Fighting Saints	61	43	31	74	57
Erik Påhlsson	Dubuque Fighting Saints	57	28	44	72	16
Austin Burnevik	Madison Capitols	61	40	31	71	24
Zam Plante	Fargo Force	57	26	45	71	4
Charlie Major	Chicago Steel	59	30	40	70	22
Jake Sondreal	Dubuque Fighting Saints	60	27	42	69	34

=== Leading goaltenders ===
Note: GP = Games played; Mins = Minutes played; W = Wins; L = Losses; OTL = Overtime losses; SOL = Shootout losses; SO = Shutouts; GAA = Goals against average; SV% = Save percentage

Player	Team	GP	Mins	W	L	OTL	SOL	SO	GAA	SV%
Hampton Slukynsky	Fargo Force	33	1938	28	3	0	0	5	1.86	0.923
Aiden Wright	Youngstown Phantoms	22	1322	13	5	2	2	1	2.59	0.902
Anton Castro	Fargo Force	31	1800	22	7	2	0	3	2.63	0.886
Carsen Musser	Madison Capitols	32	1907	17	11	2	2	0	2.74	0.905
Calvin Vachon	Waterloo Black Hawks	38	2094	22	12	0	0	2	2.81	0.902

== Clark Cup playoffs ==
First Round (Best-of-3)
E4	Youngstown	2
E5	Madison	1
E3	Green Bay	2
E6	Chicago	1
W4	Tri-City	2
W5	Sioux Falls	1
W3	Waterloo	0
W6	Lincoln	2

Conference Semifinals (Best-of-5)
E1	Dubuque	3
E4	Youngstown	1
Eastern Conference
E2	Muskegon	3
E3	Green Bay	2
W1	Fargo	3
W4	Tri-City	0
Western Conference
W2	Sioux City	3
W6	Lincoln	0

Conference Finals (Best-of-5)
E1	Dubuque	3
E2	Muskegon	0
W1	Fargo	3
W2	Sioux City	2

Clark Cup Championship (Best-of-5)
W1	Fargo	3
E1	Dubuque	1

== First Round ==
=== Eastern Conference ===
==== (E4) Youngstown Phantoms vs. (E5) Madison Capitols ====
April 15	Youngstown Phantoms	4 – 7	Madison Capitols	Covelli Centre
4:48 - Sam Ranallo (1)		First period	Rainers Rullers (1) - 15:51
5:13 - Conner de Haro (1); 12:00 - pp - Grant Young (1)		Second period	Aiden Long (1) - 6:49; Aiden Long (2) - 9:54; Max Nagel (1) - 12:13; Austin Burnevik (1) - 18:22; Brendan Lamb (1) - 18:34
8:54 - pp - Andrew Strathmann (1)		Third period	Max Nagel (2) - en - 16:59
Aiden Wright (10 saves / 16 shots); Colin Winn (8 saves / 8 shots)		Goalie stats	Carsen Musser (29 saves / 33 shots)

April 16	Youngstown Phantoms	5 – 2	Madison Capitols	Covelli Centre
No scoring		First period	Max Nagel (3) - pp - 17:01; Andrew Kuzma (1) - pp - 17:55
2:51 - Michael Burchill (1); 5:29 - Nathan Lewis (1); 10:45 - Adam Pietila (1)		Second period	No scoring
1:02 - Adam Pietila (2); 18:23 - en - Adam Pietila (3)		Third period	No scoring
Aiden Wright (15 saves / 17 shots)		Goalie stats	Patriks Bērziņš (35 saves / 39 shots)

April 17	Youngstown Phantoms	8 – 4	Madison Capitols	Covelli Centre
Ryan Rucinski (1) - 8:06; Kuzma Voronin (1) - 10:09; Ryan Rucinski (2) - 11:00		First period	No scoring
Brecken Smith (1) - 19:08		Second period	14:32 - Austin Burnevik (2)
Tory Pitner (1) - 3:03; Conner de Haro (2) - 8:47; Ryan Rucinski (3) - 14:20; Tomáš Machů (1) - sh - en - 16:35		Third period	0:43 - Max Nagel (4); 2:08 - Diego Johnson (1); 12:40 - Max Nagel (5)
Aiden Wright (19 saves / 23 shots)		Goalie stats	Carsen Musser (24 saves / 31 shots)

Youngstown wins series 2 – 1

==== (E3) Green Bay Gamblers vs. (E6) Chicago Steel ====
April 15	Green Bay Gamblers	6 – 5	Chicago Steel	Resch Center
5:19 - Jayson Shaugabay (1)		First period	Ben Yurchuk (1) - 5:59
8:19 - Lukas Peterson (1); 13:40 - Lev Katzin (1)		Second period	Mick Thompson (1) - 16:21
0:15 - pp - Julian Lutz (1); 1:22 - Lukas Peterson (2); 8:44 - Ryan Humphrey (1)		Third period	Kolin Sisson (1) - 4:02; Michael Hage (1) - pp - 8:36; Reid Conn (1) - 10:49
Adam Gajan (18 saves / 23 shots)		Goalie stats	Quentin Sigurdson (27 saves / 33 shots)

April 16	Green Bay Gamblers	2 – 5	Chicago Steel	Resch Center
No scoring		First period	Tobias Öhman (1) - 5:08
No scoring		Second period	Owen Tylec (1) - 8:32
3:20 - Mykhailo Danylov (1); 11:33 - pp - Julian Lutz (2)		Third period	Charlie Major (1) - 5:53; Joey DelGreco (1) - 10:13; Hunter Hady (1) - en - 17:49
Adam Gajan (16 saves / 20 shots); Gavin Moffatt (1 save / 1 shot)		Goalie stats	Louka Cloutier (33 saves / 35 shots)

April 17	Green Bay Gamblers	3 – 2	OT	Chicago Steel	Resch Center
No scoring		First period		No scoring
Benjamin Poitras (1) - pp - 0:47; Benjamin Poitras (2) - 3:55		Second period		11:35 - pp - Charlie Major (2)
No scoring		Third period		4:20 - pp - Michael Hage (2)
Aidan Park (1) - 16:10		First overtime period		No scoring
Gavin Moffatt (29 saves / 31 shots)		Goalie stats		Louka Cloutier (39 saves / 42 shots)

Green Bay wins series 2 – 1

=== Western Conference ===
==== (W4) Tri-City Storm vs. (W5) Sioux Falls Stampede ====
April 15	Tri-City Storm	5 – 6	OT	Sioux Falls Stampede	Viaero Center
15:05 - Nolan Roed (1)		First period		John McNelis (1) - 9:21; Chase LaPinta (1) - 14:27
16:22 - Jake Rozzi (1); 17:48 - August Falloon (1)		Second period		Chase LaPinta (2) - 4:41; Tyler Borgula (1) - 18:32
8:44 - Jake Rozzi (2); 19:56 - Jake Rozzi (3)		Third period		Tyler Borgula (2) - 19:02
No scoring		First overtime period		Hunter Anderson (1) - pp - 11:14
Cameron Korpi (31 saves / 37 shots)		Goalie stats		Christian Manz (38 saves / 43 shots)

April 16	Tri-City Storm	3 – 2	OT	Sioux Falls Stampede	Viaero Center
No scoring		First period		Noah Eyre (1) - 8:34
0:53 - pp - Cameron Briere (1)		Second period		Jaksen Panzer (1) - 14:11
11:09 - pp - August Falloon (2)		Third period		No scoring
11:14 - pp - Owen Beckner (1)		First overtime period		No scoring
Cameron Korpi (21 saves / 23 shots)		Goalie stats		Christian Manz (33 saves / 36 shots)

April 17	Tri-City Storm	8 – 3	Sioux Falls Stampede	Viaero Center
Nolan Roed (2) - 2:41; Nick Roukounakis (1) - 6:02; Artemi Nizameyev (1) - 9:23; Artemi Nizameyev (2) - 15:01		First period	14:35 - Hunter Anderson (2)
Artemi Nizameyev (3) - 5:59; Owen Beckner (2) - pp - 7:28; Owen Beckner (3) - 14:05		Second period	10:04 - pp - Hunter Anderson (3); 18:27 - pp - J.J. Wiebusch (1)
Nolan Roed (3) - 10:33		Third period	No scoring
Cameron Korpi (25 saves / 28 shots)		Goalie stats	Christian Manz (13 saves / 19 shots); Michael Chambre (9 saves / 11 shots)

Tri-City wins series 2 – 1

==== (W3) Waterloo Black Hawks vs. (W6) Lincoln Stars ====
April 15	Waterloo Black Hawks	0 – 1	Lincoln Stars	Young Arena
No scoring		First period	No scoring
No scoring		Second period	Jack Pechar (1) - 8:05
No scoring		Third period	No scoring
Calvin Vachon (26 saves / 27 shots)		Goalie stats	Yan Shostak (40 saves / 40 shots)

April 16	Waterloo Black Hawks	1 – 6	Lincoln Stars	Young Arena
No scoring		First period	Aiden Janz (1) - 2:31; Ryan Spinale (1) - 4:05
No scoring		Second period	Dashel Oliver (1) - 1:05; Justin Mexico (1) - 2:26
15:30 - Myles Hilman (1)		Third period	Matt Maltais (1) - 0:55; Dashel Oliver (2) - 17:35
Calvin Vachon (12 saves / 17 shots); Jack Spicer (7 saves / 8 shots)		Goalie stats	Yan Shostak (39 saves / 40 shots)

Lincoln wins series 2 – 0

== Conference Semifinals ==
=== Eastern Conference ===
==== (E1) Dubuque Fighting Saints vs. (E4) Youngstown Phantoms ====
April 20	Dubuque Fighting Saints	0 – 2	Youngstown Phantoms	Mystique Ice Center
No scoring		First period	No scoring
No scoring		Second period	Andrew Strathmann (2) - 2:41
No scoring		Third period	Charlie Cerrato (1) - 8:07
Kevin Reidler (23 saves / 25 shots)		Goalie stats	Aiden Wright (28 saves / 28 shots)

April 21	Dubuque Fighting Saints	6 – 0	Youngstown Phantoms	Mystique Ice Center
1:05 - Juraj Pekarčík (1); 4:10 - Beckett Hendrickson (1); 16:17 - pp - Lucas St. Louis (1)		First period	No scoring
4:26 - Jayden Jubenvill (1)		Second period	No scoring
6:52 - Jake Sondreal (1); 11:44 - Seamus Powell (1)		Third period	No scoring
Kevin Reidler (19 saves / 19 shots)		Goalie stats	Aiden Wright (19 saves / 24 shots); Colin Winn (4 saves / 5 shots)

April 23	Youngstown Phantoms	1 – 2	OT	Dubuque Fighting Saints	Covelli Centre
No scoring		First period		No scoring
No scoring		Second period		No scoring
18:18 - Michael Burchill (2)		Third period		James Reeder (1) - pp - 13:33
No scoring		First overtime period		Noah Powell (1) - 19:34
Aiden Wright (31 saves / 33 shots)		Goalie stats		Kevin Reidler (33 saves / 34 shots)

April 24	Youngstown Phantoms	0 – 2	Dubuque Fighting Saints	Covelli Centre
No scoring		First period	No scoring
No scoring		Second period	No scoring
No scoring		Third period	Beckett Hendrickson (2) - 4:59; Lucas St. Louis (2) - 11:04
Aiden Wright (20 saves / 22 shots)		Goalie stats	Kevin Reidler (22 saves / 22 shots)

Dubuque wins series 3 – 1

==== (E2) Muskegon Lumberjacks vs. (E3) Green Bay Gamblers ====
April 20	Muskegon Lumberjacks	3 – 4	Green Bay Gamblers	Trinity Health Arena
15:37 - Justin Solovey (1)		First period	Blake Bechen (1) - 7:08; Charlie Russell (1) - 8:33
4:53 - Cooper Pierson (1)		Second period	Jayson Shaugabay (2) - 7:53
6:38 - sh - David Klee (1)		Third period	Jayson Shaugabay (3) - 1:35
Shikhabutdin Gadzhiev (14 saves / 18 shots)		Goalie stats	Gavin Moffatt (26 saves / 29 shots)

April 21	Muskegon Lumberjacks	4 – 1	Green Bay Gamblers	Trinity Health Arena
No scoring		First period	No scoring
7:28 - Cody Croal (1); 10:48 - Teddy Spitznagel (1); 15:57 - Justin Solovey (2)		Second period	Lev Katzin (2) - 17:28
14:09 - Joe Connor (1)		Third period	No scoring
Shikhabutdin Gadzhiev (22 saves / 23 shots)		Goalie stats	Gavin Moffatt (22 saves / 26 shots)

April 23	Green Bay Gamblers	0 – 2	Muskegon Lumberjacks	Resch Center
No scoring		First period	Justin Solovey (3) - 18:46
No scoring		Second period	No scoring
No scoring		Third period	Matvei Gridin (1) - en - 18:54
Adam Gajan (27 saves / 28 shots)		Goalie stats	Shikhabutdin Gadzhiev (28 saves / 28 shots)

April 24	Green Bay Gamblers	2 – 1	Muskegon Lumberjacks	Resch Center
2:38 - Ben Poitras (3)		First period	Joe Connor (2) - 11:11
No scoring		Second period	No scoring
19:24 - pp - Jayson Shaugabay (4)		Third period	No scoring
Adam Gajan (31 saves / 32 shots)		Goalie stats	Shikhabutdin Gadzhiev (21 saves / 23 shots)

April 26	Muskegon Lumberjacks	4 – 3	2OT	Green Bay Gamblers	Trinity Health Arena
No scoring		First period		Tanner Bruender (1) - 13:30
14:18 - Xavier Veilleux (1)		Second period		William Hughes (1) - 2:38; Aidan Park (2) - 18:54
1:53 - Justin Solovey (4); 18:54 - Joe Connor (3)		Third period		No scoring
4:30 - Ethan Whitcomb (1)		Second overtime period		No scoring
Shikhabutdin Gadzhiev (27 saves / 30 shots)		Goalie stats		Adam Gajan (44 saves / 48 shots)

Muskegon wins series 3 – 2

=== Western Conference ===
==== (W1) Fargo Force vs. (W4) Tri-City Storm ====
April 20	Fargo Force	3 – 1	Tri-City Storm	Scheels Arena
6:50 - Zam Plante (1); 17:24 - pp - Michael La Starza (1)		First period	No scoring
No scoring		Second period	Ryan Smith (1) - 14:14
6:17 - pp - Michael La Starza (2)		Third period	No scoring
Hampton Slukynsky (23 saves / 24 shots)		Goalie stats	Cameron Korpi (37 saves / 40 shots)

April 22	Fargo Force	3 – 1	Tri-City Storm	Scheels Arena
No scoring		First period	Nick Roukounakis (2) - 0:46
0:25 - Michael Quinn (1); 7:39 - pp - Tate Taylor (1)		Second period	No scoring
19:23 - en - Mac Swanson (1)		Third period	No scoring
Hampton Slukynsky (18 saves / 19 shots)		Goalie stats	Thatcher Bernstein (30 saves / 32 shots)

April 24	Tri-City Storm	3 – 5	Fargo Force	Viaero Center
13:18 - Vsevolod Logvin (1)		First period	Finn McLaughlin (1) - 1:26
No scoring		Second period	Zam Plante (2) - 10:29; Jake Fisher (1) - 12:11
9:02 - Vsevolod Logvin (2); 18:07 - sh - Nolan Roed (4)		Third period	Merril Steenari (1) - 9:51; Gavin Morrissey (1) - pp - en - 19:02
Thatcher Bernstein (27 saves / 31 shots)		Goalie stats	Hampton Slukynsky (23 saves / 26 shots)

Fargo wins series 3 – 0

==== (W2) Sioux City Musketeers vs. (W6) Lincoln Stars ====
April 19	Lincoln Stars	2 – 3	Sioux City Musketeers	Ice Box
No scoring		First period	No scoring
No scoring		Second period	1:07 - Gavin Garry (1); 10:54 - pp - Colby Saganiuk (1); 17:28 - Finn Loftus (1)
Jack Pechar (2) - pp - 17:36; Jack Pechar (3) - 18:58		Third period	No scoring
Yan Shostak (20 saves / 23 shots)		Goalie stats	Samuel Urban (26 saves / 28 shots)

April 20	Lincoln Stars	1 – 3	Sioux City Musketeers	Ice Box
No scoring		First period	10:42 - Kaden Shahan (1)
Matt Maltais (2) - 9:58		Second period	5:10 - Hagen Burrows (1); 17:53 - pp - Ty Hanson (1)
No scoring		Third period	No scoring
Yan Shostak (25 saves / 28 shots)		Goalie stats	Samuel Urban (30 saves / 31 shots)

April 22	Sioux City Musketeers	3 – 2	OT	Lincoln Stars	Tyson Events Center
No scoring		First period		12:59 - Giacomo Martino (1)
Adam Kleber (1) - 14:32; Keaton Peters (1) - 15:25		Second period		9:23 - Ethan Gardula (1)
No scoring		Third period		No scoring
Ty Hanson (2) - 3:19		First overtime period		No scoring
Samuel Urban (14 saves / 16 shots)		Goalie stats		Yan Shostak (31 saves / 34 shots)

Sioux City wins series 3 – 0

== Conference Finals ==
=== Eastern Conference ===
==== (E1) Dubuque Fighting Saints vs. (E2) Muskegon Lumberjacks ====
April 28	Dubuque Fighting Saints	4 – 3	OT	Muskegon Lumberjacks	Mystique Ice Center
No scoring		First period		No scoring
3:26 - Gavin Cornforth (1); 5:42 - Fisher Scott (1); 12:30 - Teddy Merrill (1)		Second period		Ty Henricks (1) - 9:04
No scoring		Third period		Cody Croal (2) - 6:11; Jack Galanek (1) - 12:30
4:48 - Jayden Jubenvill (2)		First overtime period		No scoring
Kevin Reidler (27 saves / 30 shots)		Goalie stats		Shikhabutdin Gadzhiev (27 saves / 31 shots)

April 29	Dubuque Fighting Saints	4 – 3	Muskegon Lumberjacks	Mystique Ice Center
2:22 - Juraj Pekarčík (2); 12:44 - Erik Påhlsson (1); 13:09 - Jayden Jubenvill (3)		First period	No scoring
1:27 - Noah Powell (2)		Second period	Bauer Berry (1) - 6:53; David Klee (2) - 15:22
No scoring		Third period	Easton Young (1) - 7:20
Kevin Reidler (28 saves / 31 shots)		Goalie stats	Shikhabutdin Gadzhiev (7 saves / 11 shots); Miles Roberts (18 saves / 18 shots)

May 2	Muskegon Lumberjacks	0 – 4	Dubuque Fighting Saints	Trinity Health Arena
No scoring		First period	No scoring
No scoring		Second period	Lucas St. Louis (3) - pp - 7:56; Josh Giuliani (1) - 12:09
No scoring		Third period	Josh Giuliani (2) - 8:09; Gavin Cornforth (2) - 10:34
Shikhabutdin Gadzhiev (31 saves / 35 shots)		Goalie stats	Kevin Reidler (21 saves / 21 shots)

Dubuque wins series 3 – 0

=== Western Conference ===
==== (W1) Fargo Force vs. (W2) Sioux City Musketeers ====
April 28	Fargo Force	3 – 1	Sioux City Musketeers	Scheels Arena
10:49 - Mac Swanson (2)		First period	Owen Keefe (1) - 7:59
12:57 - Brandon Svoboda (1)		Second period	No scoring
1:12 - Michael La Starza (3)		Third period	No scoring
Hampton Slukynsky (21 saves / 22 shots)		Goalie stats	Samuel Urban (32 saves / 35 shots)

April 29	Fargo Force	1 – 4	Sioux City Musketeers	Scheels Arena
No scoring		First period	No scoring
15:09 - Jake Fisher (2)		Second period	Hagen Burrows (2) - 13:38
No scoring		Third period	Kaden Shahan (2) - 13:54; Colin Kessler (1) - en - 19:01; Colin Kessler (2) - en - 19:57
Hampton Slukynsky (24 saves / 26 shots)		Goalie stats	Samuel Urban (33 saves / 34 shots)

May 2	Sioux City Musketeers	5 – 2	Fargo Force	Tyson Events Center
17:32 - Colin Kessler (3)		First period	Lee Parks (1) - 4:16
10:13 - Ethan Gardula (2); 16:48 - Kaden Shahan (3); 19:37 - pp - Giacomo Martino (2)		Second period	No scoring
19:22 - en - Kaden Shahan (4)		Third period	Zam Plante (3) - pp - 12:26
Samuel Urban (24 saves / 26 shots)		Goalie stats	Hampton Slukynsky (17 saves / 21 shots)

May 3	Sioux City Musketeers	0 – 5	Fargo Force	Tyson Events Center
No scoring		First period	Tom Leppa (1) - 11:23
No scoring		Second period	Reid Daavettila (1) - 3:21
No scoring		Third period	Jake Fisher (3) - 4:51; Brandon Svoboda (2) - 6:11; Michael Neumeier (1) - 10:55
Samuel Urban (14 saves / 19 shots); Dylan Silverstein (3 saves / 3 shots)		Goalie stats	Hampton Slukynsky (20 saves / 20 shots); Anton Castro (1 save / 1 shot)

May 5	Fargo Force	4 – 0	Sioux City Musketeers	Scheels Arena
0:13 - Mac Swanson (3); 2:43 - Merril Steenari (2)		First period	No scoring
13:37 - Leo Gruba (1)		Second period	No scoring
15:30 - en - Tom Leppa (2)		Third period	No scoring
Hampton Slukynsky (21 saves / 21 shots)		Goalie stats	Samuel Urban (38 saves / 41 shots)

Fargo wins series 3 – 2

== Clark Cup Finals ==
=== (W1) Fargo Force vs. (E1) Dubuque Fighting Saints ===
May 10	Fargo Force	3 – 1	Dubuque Fighting Saints	Scheels Arena
2:59 - Leo Gruba (2); 9:43 - Brandon Svoboda (3)		First period	No scoring
No scoring		Second period	Joona Väisänen (1) - 18:25
19:21 - en - Mac Swanson (4)		Third period	No scoring
Hampton Slukynsky (22 saves / 23 shots)		Goalie stats	Kevin Reidler (28 saves / 30 shots)

May 11	Fargo Force	6 – 3	Dubuque Fighting Saints	Scheels Arena
18:44 - Michael La Starza (4); 19:14 - Tom Leppa (3)		First period	Juraj Pekarčík (3) - 6:18
17:58 - Leo Gruba (3)		Second period	Beckett Hendrickson (3) - 7:49
8:01 - Lee Parks (2); 12:31 - Tom Leppa (4); 19:28 - en - Mac Swanson (5)		Third period	Charlie Arend (1) - 9:17
Hampton Slukynsky (30 saves / 33 shots)		Goalie stats	Kevin Reidler (23 saves / 28 shots)

May 17	Dubuque Fighting Saints	3 – 1	Fargo Force	Mystique Ice Center
19:49 - pp - Gavin Cornforth (3)		First period	No scoring
10:37 - Seamus Powell (2)		Second period	Reid Daavettila (2) - 15:57
10:04 - Jake Sondreal (2)		Third period	No scoring
Kevin Reidler (23 saves / 24 shots)		Goalie stats	Hampton Slukynsky (28 saves / 31 shots)

May 18	Dubuque Fighting Saints	1 – 3	Fargo Force	Mystique Ice Center
6:56 - Jake Sondreal (3)		First period	Brasen Boser (1) - 11:04; Jake Fisher (4) - 16:03
No scoring		Second period	No scoring
No scoring		Third period	Brandon Svoboda (4) - en - 18:24
Kevin Reidler (22 saves / 24 shots)		Goalie stats	Hampton Slukynsky (22 saves / 23 shots)

Fargo wins series 3 – 1

== Playoff scoring leaders ==
Note: GP = Games played; G = Goals; A = Assists; PTS = Points; PIM = Penalty minutes

Player	Team	GP	G	A	PTS	PIM
Mac Swanson	Fargo Force	12	5	12	17	0
Juraj Pekarčík	Dubuque Fighting Saints	11	3	7	10	4
Zam Plante	Fargo Force	12	3	6	9	0
Michael La Starza	Fargo Force	12	4	4	8	21
Leo Gruba	Fargo Force	12	3	5	8	4
August Falloon	Tri-City Storm	6	2	6	8	0
Reid Daavettila	Fargo Force	12	2	6	8	2
Michael Quinn	Fargo Force	12	1	7	8	2
Kaden Shahan	Sioux City Musketeers	8	4	3	7	17
Beckett Hendrickson	Dubuque Fighting Saints	11	3	4	7	2
Jake Sondreal	Dubuque Fighting Saints	11	3	4	7	10

== Playoff leading goaltenders ==
Note: GP = Games played; MIN = Minutes played; W = Wins; L = Losses; SO = Shutouts; GA = Goals Allowed; GAA = Goals against average; SV% = Save percentage

Player	Team	GP	MIN	W	L	SO	GA	GAA	SV%
Hampton Slukynsky	Fargo Force	12	712	9	3	1	20	1.69	0.931
Kevin Reidler	Dubuque Fighting Saints	11	673	7	4	3	19	1.69	0.934
Yan Shostak	Lincoln Stars	5	298	2	3	1	10	2.01	0.939
Louka Cloutier	Chicago Steel	2	136	1	1	0	5	2.20	0.935
Samuel Urban	Sioux City Musketeers	8	468	5	3	0	19	2.44	0.917

== Postseason awards ==
=== USHL awards ===
Award	Name	Team
Player of the Year	Mac Swanson	Fargo Force
Forward of the Year	Mac Swanson	Fargo Force
Defenseman of the Year	Leo Gruba	Fargo Force
Rookie of the Year	John Mustard	Waterloo Black Hawks
Goaltender of the Year	Hampton Slukynsky	Fargo Force
Coach of the Year	Brett Skinner	Fargo Force
Scholar-Athlete of the Year	James Reeder	Dubuque Fighting Saints
Curt Hammer Award	Ryan Botterill	Youngstown Phantoms
General Manager of the Year	Cary Eades	Fargo Force

=== All-USHL First Team ===
Position	Name	Team
Goalie	Hampton Slukynsky	Fargo Force
Defenceman	Leo Gruba	Fargo Force
Defenceman	Joona Vaisanen	Dubuque Fighting Saints
Forward	Mac Swanson	Fargo Force
Forward	Michael Hage	Chicago Steel
Forward	Matvei Gridin	Muskegon Lumberjacks

=== All-USHL Second Team ===
Position	Name	Team
Goalie	Kevin Reidler	Dubuque Fighting Saints
Defenceman	Ty Hanson	Sioux City Musketeers
Defenceman	Vladislav Lukashevich	Tri-City Storm
Forward	Trevor Connelly	Tri-City Storm
Forward	Zam Plante	Fargo Force
Forward	Noah Powell	Dubuque Fighting Saints

=== All-USHL Third Team ===
Position	Name	Team
Goalie	Carsen Musser	Madison Capitols
Defenceman	Michael Hagens	Chicago Steel
Defenceman	Brasen Boser	Fargo Force
Forward	Austin Burnevik	Madison Capitols
Forward	Jake Sondreal	Dubuque Fighting Saints
Forward	Sacha Boisvert	Muskegon Lumberjacks

=== USHL All-Rookie Team ===
Position	Name	Team
Goalie	Louka Cloutier	Chicago Steel
Defenceman	Xavier Veilleux	Muskegon Lumberjacks
Defenceman	Sascha Boumedienne	Youngstown Phantoms
Forward	John Mustard	Waterloo Black Hawks
Forward	Ben Kevan	Des Moines Buccaneers
Forward	Ilya Protas	Des Moines Buccaneers

=== All-Rookie Second Team ===
Position	Name	Team
Goalie	Mikhail Yegorov	Omaha Lancers
Defenceman	Elliott Groenewold	Cedar Rapids RoughRiders
Defenceman	Alex Bales	Tri-City Storm
Forward	John McNelis	Sioux Falls Stampede
Forward	Lev Katzin	Green Bay Gamblers
Forward	Michael Barron	Dubuque Fighting Saints
