= 2022–23 USHL season =

- League: United States Hockey League
- Sport: Ice hockey
- Duration: Regular season September–April; Postseason; April–May
- Games: 62
- Teams: 16

Draft
- Top draft pick: Jak Vaarwerk
- Picked by: Des Moines Buccaneers

Regular season
- Anderson Cup: Fargo Force
- Season MVP: Macklin Celebrini (Chicago Steel)
- Top scorer: Macklin Celebrini (Chicago Steel)

Clark Cup Playoffs
- Clark Cup Playoffs MVP: Jacob Fowler (Phantoms)
- Finals champions: Youngstown Phantoms
- Runners-up: Fargo Force

USHL seasons
- ← 2021–22 2023–24 →

The 2022–23 USHL season was the 44th season of the United States Hockey League as an all-junior league. The regular season ran from September 22, 2022, to April 22, 2023, with a 62-game schedule for each team. The Western Conference champions Fargo Force were awarded the Anderson Cup for accumulating 88 points. The Eastern Conference runners-up Youngstown Phantoms won the Clark Cup playoff championship.

== Regular season ==
The league standings at the end of the regular season were as follows:

Note: x = clinched playoff berth; y = clinched conference title; z = clinched regular season title

=== Eastern Conference ===
Team	GP	W	L	OTL	SOL	Pts	GF	GA
y – Chicago Steel	62	39	18	4	1	83	275	227
x – Youngstown Phantoms	62	38	19	4	1	81	225	173
x – Team USA	62	36	21	3	2	77	271	238
x – Green Bay Gamblers	62	32	23	3	4	71	204	204
x – Dubuque Fighting Saints	62	32	24	5	1	70	206	217
x – Cedar Rapids RoughRiders	62	30	23	4	5	69	206	188
Muskegon Lumberjacks	62	27	32	3	0	57	219	266
Madison Capitols	62	17	41	2	2	38	185	290

=== Western Conference ===
Team	GP	W	L	OTL	SOL	Pts	GF	GA
z – Fargo Force	62	40	14	4	4	88	230	159
x – Waterloo Black Hawks	62	40	21	1	0	81	230	181
x – Lincoln Stars	62	37	21	3	1	78	214	185
x – Tri-City Storm	62	34	20	4	4	76	213	204
x – Sioux City Musketeers	62	29	28	2	3	63	200	200
x – Des Moines Buccaneers	62	25	28	5	4	59	167	194
Sioux Falls Stampede	62	23	31	5	3	54	181	225
Omaha Lancers	62	17	36	5	4	43	140	215

== Statistical leaders ==
=== Scoring leaders ===
Players are listed by points, then goals.

Note: GP = Games played; G = Goals; A = Assists; Pts. = Points; PIM = Penalty minutes

Player	Team	GP	G	A	Pts	PIM
Macklin Celebrini	Chicago Steel	50	46	40	86	62
Ryan Walsh	Cedar Rapids RoughRiders	61	30	49	79	29
Nicholas Moldenhauer	Chicago Steel	55	30	45	75	18
Jack Harvey	Chicago Steel	62	40	34	74	24
Ryan St. Louis	Dubuque Fighting Saints	58	30	42	72	20
Jayden Perron	Chicago Steel	61	24	48	72	20
Mason Marcellus	Lincoln Stars	58	19	49	68	42
Tanner Ludtke	Lincoln Stars	57	32	34	66	32
Cole Knuble	Fargo Force	57	30	36	66	46
Dylan Hryckowian	Cedar Rapids RoughRiders	61	26	39	65	37
Quinn Finley	Madison/Chicago	55	25	40	65	26

=== Leading goaltenders ===
Note: GP = Games played; Mins = Minutes played; W = Wins; L = Losses; OTL = Overtime losses; SOL = Shootout losses; SO = Shutouts; GAA = Goals against average; SV% = Save percentage

Player	Team	GP	Mins	W	L	OTL	SOL	SO	GAA	SV%
Jacob Fowler	Youngstown Phantoms	40	2318	27	9	3	1	5	2.28	0.921
Matej Marinov	Fargo Force	30	1782	21	4	2	3	1	2.36	0.917
Anton Castro	Fargo Force	33	1948	19	10	2	1	2	2.40	0.914
Emmett Croteau	Waterloo Black Hawks	28	1658	18	10	0	0	0	2.46	0.917
Cameron Korpi	Tri-City Storm	21	1766	13	4	3	0	1	2.52	0.911

== Clark Cup playoffs ==
Final results:

First Round (Best-of-3)
E4	Green Bay	1
E5	Dubuque	2
E3	Team USA	1
E6	Cedar Rapids	2
W4	Tri-City	2
W5	Sioux City	0
W3	Lincoln	2
W6	Des Moines	0

Conference Semifinals (Best-of-3)
E1	Chicago	2
E5	Dubuque	0
Eastern Conference
E2	Youngstown	2
E6	Cedar Rapids	0
W1	Fargo	2
W4	Tri-City	0
Western Conference
W2	Waterloo	1
W3	Lincoln	2

Conference Finals (Best-of-5)
E1	Chicago	1
E2	Youngstown	3
W1	Fargo	3
W3	Lincoln	1

Clark Cup Championship (Best-of-5)
E2	Youngstown	3
W1	Fargo	0

== First Round ==
=== Eastern Conference ===
==== (E4) Green Bay Gamblers vs. (E5) Dubuque Fighting Saints ====
April 24	Green Bay Gamblers	4 – 1	Dubuque Fighting Saints	Resch Center
No scoring		First period	No scoring
No scoring		Second period	Owen Michaels (1) - pp - 0:47
3:14 - pp - Raimonds Vītoliņš (1); 12:17 - Nicholas Van Tassell (1); 18:03 - en - Carter Rose (1); 19:31 - en - Michael DeAngelo (1)		Third period	No scoring
Kristoffer Eberly (28 saves / 29 shots)		Goalie stats	Marcus Brännman (19 saves / 21 shots)

April 25	Green Bay Gamblers	2 – 5	Dubuque Fighting Saints	Resch Center
No scoring		First period	Max Montes (1) - pp - 5:35; Brayden Morrison (1) - 11:27; James Reeder (1) - 19:06
0:32 - Raimonds Vītoliņš (2); 6:50 - Raimonds Vītoliņš (3)		Second period	Shawn O'Donnell (1) - 9:14; Max Montes (2) - pp - 19:03
No scoring		Third period	No scoring
Kristoffer Eberly (26 saves / 31 shots)		Goalie stats	Marcus Brännman (23 saves / 25 shots)

April 26	Green Bay Gamblers	2 – 3	Dubuque Fighting Saints	Resch Center
Aidan Park (1) - 9:33		First period	12:15 - pp - Ryan St. Louis (1)
No scoring		Second period	10:47 - Owen Michaels (2); 12:31 - Caelum Dick (1)
Bodie Nobes (1) - sh - 10:18		Third period	No scoring
Kristoffer Eberly (17 saves / 20 shots)		Goalie stats	Marcus Brännman (34 saves / 36 shots)

Dubuque wins series 2 – 1

==== (E3) Team USA vs. (E6) Cedar Rapids RoughRiders ====
April 24	Team USA	2 – 5	Cedar Rapids RoughRiders	USA Hockey Arena
19:49 - sh - Teddy Stiga (1)		First period	Martins Laviņš (1) - 2:04; Bryce Montgomery (1) - 8:05; Liam Lesakowski (1) - 8:17; Jacob Kraft (1) - pp - 9:21
13:27 - Austin Burnevik (1)		Second period	No scoring
No scoring		Third period	Zaccharya Wisdom (1) - en - 17:33
Nicholas Kempf (21 saves / 25 shots)		Goalie stats	Bruno Brūveris (25 saves / 27 shots)

April 25	Team USA	6 – 4	Cedar Rapids RoughRiders	USA Hockey Arena
6:35 - Austin Baker (1)		First period	No scoring
17:34 - pp - Brodie Ziemer (1)		Second period	Jacob Kraft (2) - pp - 2:42; Ryan Walsh (1) - 6:17
1:46 - Brendan McMorrow (1); 4:52 - Brendan McMorrow (2); 16:54 - Kristian Epperson (1); 19:31 - en - Charlie Cerrato (1)		Third period	Jack Musa (1) - 13:20; Ryan Walsh (2) - 14:19
Jack Parsons (24 saves / 28 shots)		Goalie stats	Bruno Brūveris (17 saves / 22 shots)

April 26	Team USA	1 – 3	Cedar Rapids RoughRiders	USA Hockey Arena
No scoring		First period	3:46 - Martins Laviņš (2); 13:23 - Martins Laviņš (3)
No scoring		Second period	10:35 - Jack Musa (2)
Max Plante (1) - 7:59		Third period	No scoring
Jack Parsons (32 saves / 35 shots)		Goalie stats	Bruno Brūveris (28 saves / 29 shots)

Cedar Rapids wins series 2 – 1

=== Western Conference ===
==== (W4) Tri-City Storm vs. (W5) Sioux City Musketeers ====
April 24	Tri-City Storm	6 – 1	Sioux City Musketeers	Viaero Center
6:14 - Graham Gamache (1)		First period	No scoring
12:31 - Kieran Cebrian (1)		Second period	No scoring
3:15 - Alex Bump (1); 6:23 - Trevor Connelly (1); 8:50 - pp - Graham Gamache (2); 11:33 - sh - Graham Gamache (3)		Third period	Ryan Conmy (1) - 2:50
Cameron Korpi (13 saves / 14 shots)		Goalie stats	Croix Kochendorfer (20 saves / 26 shots); Axel Mangbo (1 save / 1 shot)

April 25	Tri-City Storm	5 – 4	Sioux City Musketeers	Viaero Center
1:45 - Alex Bump (2); 11:25 - pp - Evan Werner (1)		First period	Kaden Shahan (1) - 7:13; Benjamin Poitras (1) - pp - 9:28
3:55 - Trevor Connelly (2); 10:50 - Dane Dowiak (1)		Second period	Ben Doran (1) - 18:37
15:09 - Kieran Cebrian (2)		Third period	Grant Slukynsky (1) - 8:39
Cameron Korpi (19 saves / 23 shots)		Goalie stats	Croix Kochendorfer (12 saves / 16 shots); Axel Mangbo (9 saves / 10 shots)

Tri-City wins series 2 – 0

==== (W3) Lincoln Stars vs. (W6) Des Moines Buccaneers ====
April 24	Lincoln Stars	5 – 2	Des Moines Buccaneers	Ice Box
2:42 - Jack Larrigan (1); 15:50 - Cole Crusberg-Roseen (1)		First period	No scoring
5:28 - Tanner Ludtke (1); 17:17 - Patrick Raftery (1)		Second period	No scoring
12:24 - Doug Grimes (1)		Third period	Michael Bevilacqua (1) - pp - 0:18; Jak Vaarwerk (1) - ps - 4:10
Cameron Whitehead (15 saves / 17 shots)		Goalie stats	Max Lundgren (27 saves / 31 shots); Jan Korec (9 saves / 10 shots)

April 25	Lincoln Stars	4 – 3	OT	Des Moines Buccaneers	Ice Box
3:25 - Tanner Ludtke (2)		First period		Joey Muldowney (1) - 7:33
No scoring		Second period		Henry Bartle (1) - pp - 16:28
10:28 - Mason Marcellus (1); 17:38 - Tyler Dunbar (1)		Third period		Aiden VanRooyan (1) - 7:24
7:54 - Brennan Ali (1)		First overtime period		No scoring
Cameron Whitehead (29 saves / 32 shots)		Goalie stats		Max Lundgren (29 saves / 33 shots)

Lincoln wins series 2 – 0

== Conference Semifinals ==
=== Eastern Conference ===
==== (E1) Chicago Steel vs. (E5) Dubuque Fighting Saints ====
April 29	Chicago Steel	3 – 1	Dubuque Fighting Saints	Fox Valley Ice Arena
6:36 - Jayden Perron (1)		First period	Owen Michaels (3) - pp - 19:55
1:58 - pp - Jayden Perron (2)		Second period	No scoring
18:31 - en - Jayden Perron (3)		Third period	No scoring
Christian Manz (30 saves / 31 shots)		Goalie stats	Marcus Brännman (32 saves / 34 shots)

April 30	Chicago Steel	5 – 4	Dubuque Fighting Saints	Fox Valley Ice Arena
3:38 - Nolan Joyce (1); 4:08 - Charlie Major (1)		First period	Riley Stuart (1) - 1:21; Max Montes (3) - pp - 14:22
6:29 - Cameron Johnson (1); 18:09 - pp - Michael Emerson (1)		Second period	Max Burkholder (1) - 18:48
15:15 - Quinn Finley (1)		Third period	No scoring
Christian Manz (24 saves / 28 shots)		Goalie stats	Marcus Brännman (31 saves / 36 shots)

Chicago wins series 2 – 0

==== (E2) Youngstown Phantoms vs. (E6) Cedar Rapids RoughRiders ====
April 28	Youngstown Phantoms	3 – 2	2OT	Cedar Rapids RoughRiders	Covelli Centre
5:19 - Andrew Strathmann (1)		First period		No scoring
7:10 - Matthew Perkins (1)		Second period		Tyson Gross (1) - pp - 12:00
No scoring		Third period		Jacob Kraft (3) - pp - 18:49
0:39 - Andon Cerbone (1)		Second overtime period		No scoring
Jacob Fowler (40 saves / 42 shots)		Goalie stats		Bruno Brūveris (29 saves / 32 shots)

April 30	Youngstown Phantoms	3 – 1	Cedar Rapids RoughRiders	Covelli Centre
No scoring		First period	No scoring
9:37 - William Whitelaw (1)		Second period	Jack Musa (3) - 15:04
9:01 - Jack Willson (1); 18:40 - en - Andon Cerbone (2)		Third period	No scoring
Jacob Fowler (24 saves / 25 shots)		Goalie stats	Bruno Brūveris (27 saves / 29 shots)

Youngstown wins series 2 – 0

=== Western Conference ===
==== (W1) Fargo Force vs. (W4) Tri-City Storm ====
April 28	Fargo Force	3 – 2	Tri-City Storm	Scheels Arena
9:17 - pp - Owen Mehlenbacher (1)		First period	No scoring
15:51 - Verner Miettinen (1)		Second period	No scoring
11:38 - Boris Skalos (1)		Third period	Tanner Adams (1) - pp - 5:17; Sebastian Törnqvist (1) - 14:25
Matej Marinov (25 saves / 27 shots)		Goalie stats	Cameron Korpi (28 saves / 31 shots)

April 29	Fargo Force	3 – 2	OT	Tri-City Storm	Scheels Arena
No scoring		First period		Jacob Jeannette (1) - 6:58
8:06 - Charlie Russell (1)		Second period		No scoring
1:39 - pp - Verner Miettinen (2)		Third period		Alex Bump (3) - 17:39
1:38 - sh - Charlie Russell (2)		First overtime period		No scoring
Matej Marinov (29 saves / 31 shots)		Goalie stats		Cameron Korpi (28 saves / 31 shots)

Fargo wins series 2 – 0

==== (W2) Waterloo Black Hawks vs. (W3) Lincoln Stars ====
April 28	Waterloo Black Hawks	2 – 7	Lincoln Stars	Young Arena
No scoring		First period	Brennan Ali (2) - 15:33
2:20 - pp - Sam Rinzel (1)		Second period	Patrick Raftery (2) - 2:48; Klāvs Veinbergs (1) - 10:36; Tanner Ludtke (3) - pp - 12:12
10:49 - pp - Caden Brown (1)		Third period	Brennan Ali (3) - 4:46; Klāvs Veinbergs (2) - pp - 8:32; Tyler Dunbar (2) - sh - en - 16:37
Emmett Crouteau (27 saves / 33 shots); Jack Spicer (1 save / 1 shot)		Goalie stats	Cameron Whitehead (44 saves / 46 shots)

April 29	Waterloo Black Hawks	6 – 1	Lincoln Stars	Young Arena
16:04 - pp - Griffin Erdman (1)		First period	No scoring
15:38 - Connor Brown (1)		Second period	Mason Marcellus (2) - pp - 17:34
0:56 - Gavin O'Connell (1); 18:53 - pp - en - Caden Brown (2); 19:15 - Myles Hilman (1); 19:58 - Connor Brown (2)		Third period	No scoring
Emmett Crouteau (28 saves / 29 shots)		Goalie stats	Cameron Whitehead (24 saves / 29 shots)

April 30	Waterloo Black Hawks	1 – 3	Lincoln Stars	Young Arena
No scoring		First period	11:42 - Jack Larrigan (2)
Ben Robertson (1) - 6:14		Second period	No scoring
No scoring		Third period	2:34 - Mason Marcellus (3); 18:48 - en - Daniel Sambuco (1)
Emmett Crouteau (20 saves / 22 shots)		Goalie stats	Cameron Whitehead (19 saves / 20 shots)

Lincoln wins series 2 – 1

== Conference Finals ==
=== Eastern Conference ===
==== (E1) Chicago Steel vs. (E2) Youngstown Phantoms ====
May 5	Chicago Steel	1 – 4	Youngstown Phantoms	Fox Valley Ice Arena
No scoring		First period	Brandon Svoboda (1) - 11:38; Andrew Centrella (1) - pp - 15:46
No scoring		Second period	Shane Lachance (1) - 11:20
12:23 - pp - Jayden Perron (4)		Third period	William Whitelaw (2) - en - 19:58
Christian Manz (36 saves / 39 shots)		Goalie stats	Jacob Fowler (27 saves / 28 shots)

May 6	Chicago Steel	5 – 2	Youngstown Phantoms	Fox Valley Ice Arena
14:04 - pp - Michael Emerson (2); 18:14 - Anthony Dowd (1)		First period	No scoring
1:42 - Quinn Finley (2); 4:44 - Michael Hage (1)		Second period	Martin Mišiak (1) - pp - 8:15; Andrew Strathmann (2) - pp - 18:57
13:04 - pp - Jack Harvey (1)		Third period	No scoring
Christian Manz (44 saves / 46 shots)		Goalie stats	Jacob Fowler (31 saves / 36 shots)

May 8	Youngstown Phantoms	4 – 1	Chicago Steel	Covelli Centre
0:57 - Shane Lachance (2)		First period	No scoring
10:04 - pp - Martin Mišiak (2)		Second period	No scoring
4:23 - Andon Cerbone (3); 16:15 - Andrew Strathmann (3)		Third period	Michael Emerson (3) - 3:40
Jacob Fowler (29 saves / 30 shots)		Goalie stats	Christian Manz (38 saves / 42 shots)

May 9	Youngstown Phantoms	2 – 1	OT	Chicago Steel	Covelli Centre
No scoring		First period		No scoring
No scoring		Second period		Jack Harvey (2) - pp - 5:24
17:54 - Kenta Isogai (1)		Third period		No scoring
7:50 - William Whitelaw (3)		First overtime period		No scoring
Jacob Fowler (28 saves / 29 shots)		Goalie stats		Christian Manz (42 saves / 44 shots)

Youngstown wins series 3 – 1

=== Western Conference ===
==== (W1) Fargo Force vs. (W3) Lincoln Stars ====
May 4	Fargo Force	1 – 0	Lincoln Stars	Scheels Arena
No scoring		First period	No scoring
No scoring		Second period	No scoring
19:16 - pp - Cole Knuble (1)		Third period	No scoring
Matej Marinov (25 saves / 25 shots)		Goalie stats	Cameron Whitehead (30 saves / 31 shots)

May 5	Fargo Force	3 – 4	Lincoln Stars	Scheels Arena
3:14 - Mac Swanson (1); 7:37 - Boris Skalos (2)		First period	No scoring
4:55 - Ģirts Silkalns (1)		Second period	Boston Buckberger (1) - pp - 2:19; German Yavash (1) - 2:33; Tanner Ludtke (4) - sh - 8:26
No scoring		Third period	Mason Marcellus (4) - 10:56
Matej Marinov (26 saves / 30 shots)		Goalie stats	Cameron Whitehead (23 saves / 26 shots)

May 7	Lincoln Stars	2 – 3	Fargo Force	Ice Box
3:30 - Jack Pechar (1)		First period	Mac Swanson (2) - 5:01
No scoring		Second period	Leo Gruba (1) - 19:53
19:00 - Mason Marcellus (5)		Third period	Cole Knuble (2) - 9:52
Cameron Whitehead (21 saves / 24 shots)		Goalie stats	Anton Castro (42 saves / 44 shots)

May 8	Lincoln Stars	4 – 8	Fargo Force	Ice Box
1:25 - Doug Grimes (2); 11:41 - Doug Grimes (3); 15:37 - pp - Tanner Ludtke (5); 19:24 - pp - Antonio Fernandez (1)		First period	Owen Mehlenbacher (2) - 0:52; Cole Knuble (3) - 2:48; Charlie Russell (3) - 13:28
No scoring		Second period	No scoring
No scoring		Third period	Cole Knuble (4) - 5:58; Owen Mehlenbacher (3) - pp - 8:22; Cole Knuble (5) - pp - 9:41; Cole Knuble (6) - en - 16:27; Mac Swanson (3) - en - 18:44
Cameron Whitehead (9 saves / 15 shots); Lucas Massie (3 saves / 3 shots)		Goalie stats	Matej Marinov (17 saves / 21 shots); Anton Castro (13 saves / 13 shots)

Fargo wins series 3 – 1

== Clark Cup Finals ==
=== (W1) Fargo Force vs. (E2) Youngstown Phantoms ===
May 12	Fargo Force	1 – 4	Youngstown Phantoms	Scheels Arena
No scoring		First period	No scoring
No scoring		Second period	No scoring
19:02 - Anthony Menghini (1)		Third period	William Whitelaw (4) - pp - 1:36; Miles Gunty (1) - 2:52; Shane Lachance (3) - 15:15; William Whitelaw (5) - en - 15:41
Anton Castro (20 saves / 23 shots)		Goalie stats	Jacob Fowler (29 saves / 30 shots)

May 13	Fargo Force	1 – 2	OT	Youngstown Phantoms	Scheels Arena
No scoring		First period		No scoring
9:27 - Bret Link (1)		Second period		Miles Gunty (2) - 2:49
No scoring		Third period		No scoring
No scoring		First overtime period		Andon Cerbone (4) - 6:59
Anton Castro (24 saves / 26 shots)		Goalie stats		Jacob Fowler (30 saves / 31 shots)

May 19	Youngstown Phantoms	1 – 0	Fargo Force	Covelli Centre
No scoring		First period	No scoring
No scoring		Second period	No scoring
0:24 - Andon Cerbone (5)		Third period	No scoring
Jacob Fowler (22 saves / 22 shots)		Goalie stats	Matej Marinov (23 saves / 24 shots)

Youngstown wins series 3 – 0

== Playoff Statistics ==
Statistics reflect games played through May 19, 2023

=== Scoring leaders ===
Note: GP = Games played; G = Goals; A = Assists; PTS = Points; PIM = Penalty minutes

Player	Team	GP	G	A	PTS	PIM
Mason Marcellus	Lincoln Stars	9	5	7	12	14
Mac Swanson	Fargo Force	9	3	7	10	2
Martin Mišiak	Youngstown Phantoms	9	2	8	10	8
Cole Knuble	Fargo Force	9	6	3	9	16
Andon Cerbone	Youngstown Phantoms	9	5	4	9	4
William Whitelaw	Youngstown Phantoms	9	5	4	9	18
Doug Grimes	Lincoln Stars	8	3	6	9	14
Owen Michaels	Dubuque Fighting Saints	5	3	5	8	0
Boston Buckberger	Lincoln Stars	9	1	7	8	0
Tanner Ludtke	Lincoln Stars	9	5	2	7	4
Max Montes	Dubuque Fighting Saints	5	3	4	7	0

=== Leading goaltenders ===
Note: GP = Games played; MIN = Minutes played; W = Wins; L = Losses; SO = Shutouts; GA = Goals Allowed; GAA = Goals against average; SV% = Save percentage

Player	Team	GP	MIN	W	L	SO	GA	GAA	SV%
Jacob Fowler	Youngstown Phantoms	9	575	8	1	1	13	1.36	0.952
Anton Castro	Fargo Force	3	159	3	3	0	5	1.88	0.938
Matej Marinov	Fargo Force	7	384	3	3	1	15	2.34	0.906
Bruno Brūveris	Cedar Rapids RoughRiders	5	316	2	3	0	13	2.46	0.929
Christian Manz	Chicago Steel	6	366	3	3	0	16	2.63	0.930

== Postseason awards ==
=== USHL awards ===
Award	Name	Team
Player of the Year	Macklin Celebrini	Chicago Steel
Forward of the Year	Macklin Celebrini	Chicago Steel
Defenseman of the Year	Eric Pohlkamp	Cedar Rapids RoughRiders
Rookie of the Year	Macklin Celebrini	Chicago Steel
Goaltender of the Year	Jacob Fowler	Youngstown Phantoms
Coach of the Year	Nick Oliver	Fargo Force
Scholar-Athlete of the Year	Lucas St. Louis	Dubuque Fighting Saints
Curt Hammer Award	Cole Knuble	Fargo Force
General Manager of the Year	Bryn Chyzyk	Waterloo Black Hawks

=== All-USHL First Team ===
Position	Name	Team
Goalie	Jacob Fowler	Youngstown Phantoms
Defenseman	Eric Pohlkamp	Cedar Rapids RoughRiders
Defenseman	Joe Palodichuk	Fargo Force
Forward	Macklin Celebrini	Chicago Steel
Forward	Ryan Walsh	Cedar Rapids RoughRiders
Forward	Cole Knuble	Fargo Force

=== All-USHL Second Team ===
Position	Name	Team
Goalie	Matej Marinov	Fargo Force
Defenseman	Max Burkholder	Dubuque Fighting Saints
Defenseman	Aaron Pionk	Waterloo Black Hawks
Forward	Jack Harvey	Chicago Steel
Forward	Ryan St. Louis	Dubuque Fighting Saints
Forward	Mason Marcellus	Lincoln Stars

=== All-USHL Third Team ===
Position	Name	Team
Goalie	Cameron Whitehead	Lincoln Stars
Defenseman	Artyom Levshunov	Green Bay Gamblers
Defenseman	Boston Buckberger	Lincoln Stars
Forward	Ryan Conmy	Sioux City Musketeers
Forward	Garrett Schifsky	Waterloo Black Hawks
Forward	Nick Moldenhauer	Chicago Steel

=== USHL All-Rookie Team ===
Position	Name	Team
Goalie	Michael Hrabal	Omaha Lancers
Defenseman	Artyom Levshunov	Green Bay Gamblers
Defenseman	Will Felicio	Madison Capitols
Forward	Macklin Celebrini	Chicago Steel
Forward	Mac Swanson	Fargo Force
Forward	Ryan Conmy	Sioux City Musketeers

=== All-Rookie Second Team ===
Position	Name	Team
Defenseman	Ty Hanson	Sioux City Musketeers
Defenseman	Michael Hagens	Chicago Steel
Forward	Sacha Boisvert	Muskegon Lumberjacks
Forward	Trevor Connelly	Tri-City Storm
Forward	William Whitelaw	Youngstown Phantoms
