= Matvei Gridin =

Russian ice hockey player (born 2006)

- Gridin with the Calgary Flames in 2026
- Born: 1 March 2006 (age 20) Kurgan, Russia
- Height: 6 ft 1 in (185 cm)
- Weight: 182 lb (83 kg; 13 st 0 lb)
- Position: Left wing
- Shoots: Left
- NHL team: Calgary Flames
- NHL draft: 28th overall, 2024; Calgary Flames
- Playing career: 2025–present

Matvei Andreyevich Gridin (Russian: Матвей Андреевич Гридин; born 1 March 2006) is a Russian professional ice hockey player who is a left winger for the Calgary Flames of the National Hockey League (NHL). He was drafted 28th overall by the Flames in the 2024 NHL entry draft.

== Playing career ==
Gridin began playing ice hockey at three years old in his hometown of Kurgan. He played for Spartak Saint Petersburg and Avangard Omsk's organizations at youth level before being selected by the Muskegon Lumberjacks in the 15th round of the 2022 United States Hockey League draft. During the 2022–23 season, he recorded eight goals and 11 assists in 40 games for the Lumberjacks.

During the 2023–24 season, Gridin led the USHL in scoring with 38 goals and 45 assists in 60 games. He ranked fourth in the league in goals and tied for fourth in assists. Following the season he was named to the All-USHL first team. Following his successful season, Gridin was drafted 28th overall by the Calgary Flames in the 2024 NHL entry draft. On 5 July 2024, he signed a three-year, entry-level contract with the Flames.

On 3 July, Gridin was drafted first overall by the Val-d'Or Foreurs in the 2024 CHL Import Draft. He was committed to play college ice hockey at Michigan, but forfeited that eligibility after signing his entry-level contract with the Flames instead. On 20 September, the Foreurs traded his rights to the Shawinigan Cataractes. During the 2024–25 season, in his rookie year, he led the team in scoring with 36 goals and 43 assists in 56 games. He finished the season leading all Quebec Maritimes Junior Hockey League (QMJHL) rookies in points (79), goals (36), assists (43), plus/minus (+31), shots (236), game-winning goals (5), power-play assists (15), and shorthanded goals (4). Following an outstanding season, he was named to the QMJHL All-Rookie team, and Canadian Hockey League (CHL) All-Rookie team. He also received the Michel Bergeron Trophy and Sidney Crosby Trophy as offensive rookie and overall rookie of the year.

On 8 October 2025, Gridin made his NHL debut for the Calgary Flames and recorded his first NHL goal in a 4–3 shootout win against the Edmonton Oilers.

== Career statistics ==
			Regular season					Playoffs
Season	Team	League	GP	G	A	Pts	PIM	GP	G	A	Pts	PIM
2022–23	Muskegon Lumberjacks	USHL	40	8	11	19	12	—	—	—	—	—
2023–24	Muskegon Lumberjacks	USHL	60	38	45	83	51	8	1	4	5	2
2024–25	Shawinigan Cataractes	QMJHL	56	36	43	79	27	16	8	9	17	6
2025–26	Calgary Flames	NHL	37	6	14	20	2	—	—	—	—	—
2025–26	Calgary Wranglers	AHL	37	10	20	30	18	—	—	—	—	—
NHL totals			37	6	14	20	2	—	—	—	—	—

== Awards and honours ==
Award	Year	Ref
USHL
All-USHL first team	2024	
CHL
All-Rookie team	2025	
QMJHL
All-Rookie team	2025	
Michel Bergeron Trophy	2025	
Sidney Crosby Trophy	2025	

Awards and achievements
Preceded by Zayne Parekh	Calgary Flames first-round draft pick 2024	Succeeded by Cole Reschny
