= Cole Knuble =

American ice hockey player (born 2004)

- Born: July 1, 2004 (age 22) Grand Rapids, Michigan, United States
- Height: 5 ft 10 in (178 cm)
- Weight: 192 lb (87 kg; 13 st 10 lb)
- Position: Forward
- Shoots: Right
- NHL team: Philadelphia Flyers
- NHL draft: 103rd overall, 2023; Philadelphia Flyers
- Playing career: 2026–present

Cole Knuble (born July 1, 2004) is an American professional ice hockey forward for the Philadelphia Flyers of the National Hockey League (NHL). He is the son of former NHL player Mike Knuble.

== Playing career ==
Knuble grew up playing minor league hockey in the United States, eventually making his way to the Fargo Force of the United States Hockey League where, in 2023 following his second season with the club, he was awarded the Dave Tyler Junior Player of the Year Award as the most outstanding American-born player in junior ice hockey. Following this campaign, he was drafted 103rd overall by the Philadelphia Flyers in the 2023 NHL Entry Draft. Knuble was originally eligible for the 2022 draft but was not selected by any team, with Flyers Assistant General Manager Brent Flahr noting that Knuble's skating in his draft year was of concern.

Following his draft year, Knuble attended the University of Notre Dame and joined the school's Fighting Irish ice hockey team. In his first season with the team, he appeared in all 36 games, scoring 20 points. In his second season, he was a finalist for the Hobey Baker Award. During his third term with the team, after registering 31 points in 36 games, Knuble signed a two-year, entry-level contract with the Flyers and immediately reported to their American Hockey League affiliate, the Lehigh Valley Phantoms. He appeared in seven games with the Phantoms during the rest of the 2025–26 AHL season, scoring three points.

Knuble started his first professional season with the Phantoms but was called up to the Flyers on October 19, 2026, after scoring four points in six games, following injuries to Flyers players Owen Tippett, Tyson Foerster and Travis Konecny. He made his NHL debut the same night, recording almost 14 minutes of ice time in a win over the Colorado Avalanche. Two days later, he scored his first two NHL goals in a 3–1 win over the Buffalo Sabres.

== Personal life ==
Knubles father is former professional ice hockey player Mike Knuble, who played over 1,000 games in the NHL. His father signed as a free agent with the Flyers two days after he was born. Cole has two siblings.

== Career statistics ==
=== Regular season and playoffs ===
			Regular season					Playoffs
Season	Team	League	GP	G	A	Pts	PIM	GP	G	A	Pts	PIM
2021–22	Fargo Force	USHL	62	20	29	49	12	2	0	0	0	0
2022–23	Fargo Force	USHL	57	30	36	66	46	9	6	3	9	16
2023–24	University of Notre Dame	B1G	36	9	11	20	12	—	—	—	—	—
2024–25	University of Notre Dame	B1G	34	12	27	39	12	—	—	—	—	—
2025–26	University of Notre Dame	B1G	36	9	22	31	32	—	—	—	—	—
2025–26	Lehigh Valley Phantoms	AHL	7	1	2	3	0	—	—	—	—	—
AHL totals			7	1	2	3	0	—	—	—	—	—

=== International ===
Year	Team	Event	Result	GP	G	A	Pts	PIM
2021	United States	HG18	5th	4	4	0	4	4
Junior totals				4	4	0	4	4

== Awards and honors ==
Award	Year
College
Academic All-Big Ten	2025, 2026
All-Big Ten Second Team	2025
Preseason First Team All-Big Ten	2026
