= Madison Capitols =

American junior ice hockey team

- City: Middleton, Wisconsin
- League: United States Hockey League
- Conference: Eastern
- Founded: 2014
- Home arena: Bob Suter's Capitol Ice Arena
- Colors: Navy, columbia, gray, red, white
- Owner: Ryan Suter
- President: Andrew Joudrey
- General manager: Andy Brandt
- Head coach: Andy Brandt

The Madison Capitols are a junior ice hockey team that plays in the Eastern Conference of the United States Hockey League. Founded in 2014, the team plays its home games at Bob Suter's Capitol Ice Arena in Middleton, Wisconsin.

== History ==
On November 26, 2013, the management of Madtown Hockey, LLC announced that the Madison Capitols would be returning to Madison in the 2014–15 season. Former Wisconsin Badgers, Tom Sagissor and Ryan Suter, at the time, an NHL player with the Minnesota Wild, would join the ownership group. It was also announced that the Madison Capitols would play at the Alliant Energy Center in Madison, Wisconsin. Steve Miller was originally announced as head coach and general manager, but stepped down on May 19, 2014, prior to the club playing a single game.

On May 22, 2014, Luke Strand was introduced as the Madison Capitols head coach and general manager. He was joined on the bench by fellow Eau Claire native Keith Paulsen and longtime NHL veteran and Stanley Cup Champion Tony Hrkac.

Following Bob Suter's death in September 2014, the Capitols honored the lifelong Madison native and gold medalist with stickers on team helmets, a banner bearing his jersey number 20 inside the Coliseum, and the ice rink named in his honor (Bob Suter Memorial Rink).

The Capitols began their first season back in the USHL on September 27, 2014, with a 4–3 loss at Muskegon. Luke McElhenie, a native of Sauk City, WI, scored the first goal in the new era of the Capitols. McElhenie previously played for Bob Suter and the Madison Capitols AAA program. Madison picked up its first victory in the USHL on October 24, defeating the Sioux Falls Stampede 3–1.

Following the 2014–15 season, Luke Strand left the organization to accept an assistant coaching position at the University of Wisconsin–Madison under head coach Mike Eaves.

On June 10, 2015, it was announced that Troy G. Ward had been hired as the new head coach and general manager. After one season, Troy Ward resigned his positions with the organization and was replaced as head coach and general manager by Garrett Suter.

On July 28, 2017, the Capitols announced that Andrew Joudrey was named the team's new president. That same day, the team announced plans to relocate from the Alliant Energy Center to Hartmeyer Ice Arena for the 2017–18 season. Reasons cited for the move included a decrease in available dates for hockey at the Alliant Energy Center and a desire on the Capitols' part for better sightlines and fan experience. Negotiations between the Capitols and Hartmeyer management over needed facility upgrades would come to an impasse, and on September 11, the Capitols announced they would instead play the 2017–18 season at Bob Suter's Capitol Ice Arena, a two-rink facility in suburban Middleton owned by Ryan Suter and named in father Bob Suter's memory. The Capitol Ice Arena, already a practice site for the Capitols, had a capacity of 1,300 fans for hockey, and became the smallest arena in the USHL. In the 2018 off-season, the Capitols renovated the rink to increase the capacity and add more suites. Head coach and general manager Garrett Suter stepped down after the 2019–20 season.

Due to the on-going restrictions related to the COVID-19 pandemic, the Capitols went on hiatus for the 2020–21 season. The Capitols resumed play for the 2021–22 season.

== Season-by-season record ==
Season	GP	W	L	OTL	Pts	GF	GA	PIM	Finish	Playoffs
2014–15	60	24	25	11	59	172	212	1193	7th of 9, Eastern; 12th of 17, USHL	Did not qualify
2015–16	60	25	27	8	58	169	198	892	7th of 9, Eastern; 13th of 17, USHL	Did not qualify
2016–17	60	23	32	5	51	135	192	851	7th of 9, Eastern; 12th of 17, USHL	Did not qualify
2017–18	60	23	33	4	50	183	224	755	8th of 9, Eastern; 15th of 17, USHL	Did not qualify
2018–19	62	15	38	9	39	145	249	822	9th of 9, Eastern; 16th of 17, USHL	Did not qualify
2019–20	50	12	34	4	28	122	219	889	Season cancelled due to COVID-19 pandemic	
2020-21	--	--	--	--	--	--	--	--	Did not play due to COVID-19 pandemic	
2021-22	62	30	29	3	63	233	233	758	5th of 8, Eastern; 9th of 16, USHL	Lost Championship, 1-3 vs. Sioux City Musketeers
2022-23	62	17	41	4	38	185	290	686	8th of 8, Eastern; 16th of 16, USHL	Did not qualify
2023-24	62	33	23	6	72	218	206	629	5th of 8, Eastern; 7th of 16, USHL	Lost Conference QF, 1-2 vs. Youngstown Phantoms

== Personnel ==
=== Awards and player recognition ===
- Ryan Edquist – 2015–16 USHL All-Rookie Team
- Sam McCormick – 2015-16 All-USHL 3rd Team
- Michael Mancinelli – 2017–18 USHL All-Rookie Team
- Mick Messner – 2016 U.S. Junior Select Team
- Ryan O'Reilly – 2017–18 USHL All-Rookie Team, 2018 U.S. Junior Select Team
- Simon Latkoczy – 2019-20 USHL All-Rookie Team
- Ryan Kirwan – 2019-20 USHL All-Rookie Team
- Christian Stoever – 2019-20 All-USHL 3rd Team
- Luke Mittelstadt - 2021-22 All-USHL 1st Team
- Will Felicio - 2022-23 USHL All-Rookie Team
- Austin Burnevik - 2023-24 All-USHL 3rd Team
- Carsen Musser - 2023-24 All-USHL 3rd Team
- Ryker Lee - 2024-25 USHL Rookie of the Year
- Ryker Lee - 2024-25 All-USHL 1st Team
- Ryker Lee - 2024-25 USHL All-Rookie 1st Team
- Jet Kwajah - 2024-25 USHL All-Rookie 1st Team
