= Julian Lutz =

German ice hockey player (born 2004)

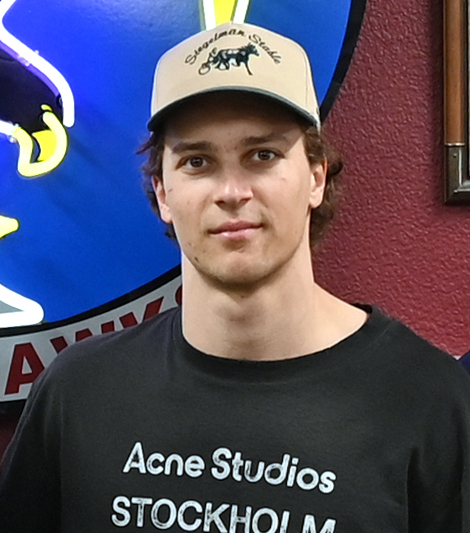
- Lutz in 2025
- Born: 29 February 2004 (age 22) Weingarten, Germany
- Height: 6 ft 2 in (188 cm)
- Weight: 185 lb (84 kg; 13 st 3 lb)
- Position: Winger
- Shoots: Left
- NHL team (P) Cur. team Former teams: Utah Mammoth; Tucson Roadrunners (AHL); EC Red Bull Salzburg; EHC Red Bull München
- NHL draft: 43rd overall, 2022; Arizona Coyotes
- Playing career: 2020–present

Julian Lutz (born 29 February 2004) is a German professional ice hockey winger currently playing for the Tucson Roadrunners in the American Hockey League (AHL) as a prospect to the Utah Mammoth of the National Hockey League (NHL). He was drafted 43rd overall by the Arizona Coyotes in the 2022 NHL entry draft.

== Playing career ==
Lutz grew up in the small town of Weingarten near Ravensburg, where hockey is the most popular sport. He was influenced heavily by his parents who both played the game. He began his youth career with local club EV Ravensburg. At age twelve, he joined the Red Bull Academy in Austria. Lutz made his professional debut in the ICE Hockey League during the 2020-21 season with EC Red Bull Salzburg. The following season, he made his debut in the DEL with EHC Red Bull München at age eighteen. He was linked with a move to North America by at least 2021 as he was selected by the Sault Ste. Marie Greyhounds with the 89th pick in the 2021 Canadian Hockey League Import Draft.

Lutz was drafted 43rd overall in the second round of the 2022 NHL entry draft by the Arizona Coyotes. He then spent an additional season developing with Red Bull München. That season, the club won the Deutsche Eishockey Liga championship. He was limited to twenty-four appearances that campaign as he was recovering from injuries, including a stress fracture to his spine from weight training.

Prior to the 2023–24 NHL season, Lutz participated in the Coyotes' training camp and appeared in NHL exhibition matches. He was eventually assigned to the Green Bay Gamblers of the United States Hockey League to continue his development for another year. Over the campaign, he led the team in scoring with twenty-four goals and forty-four assists in sixty-eight matches. His assist tally was sixth-best in the league that season, while his 1.36 points-per-game was ranked ninth.

Lutz spent summer 2024 training at the Red Bull Academy in Salzburg. On 17 June 2024, it was announced that he had signed a three-year, entry-level NHL contract with the Utah Mammoth (the then Utah Hockey Club), the new name of the Arizona Coyotes upon the franchise's relocation to Salt Lake City. He became the second player ever signed by the club after relocating, behind only Noel Nordh who finalized a deal a few months prior. With the deal, Lutz immediately became eligible to join Utah's AHL affiliate, the Tucson Roadrunners. Lutz was tied as the Utah HC's top scorer during the club's rookie showcase in September 2024, with his performances including three points scored against the Vegas Golden Knights prospect team. When the AHL preseason began, Lutz was part of the Tucson Roadrunners squad and appeared in its first exhibition match of the season on 5 October 2024. He went on to tally in the eventual 6–2 victory over the Henderson Silver Knights.

== Career statistics ==
=== Regular season and playoffs ===
			Regular season					Playoffs
Season	Team	League	GP	G	A	Pts	PIM	GP	G	A	Pts	PIM
2020–21	RB Hockey Juniors	AlpsHL	31	13	13	26	23	1	0	1	1	2
2020–21	EC Red Bull Salzburg	ICEHL	7	2	1	3	0	—	—	—	—	—
2021–22	EHC Red Bull München	DEL	14	1	2	3	8	—	—	—	—	—
2022–23	EHC Red Bull München	DEL	24	1	7	8	16	5	0	0	0	0
2023–24	Green Bay Gamblers	USHL	50	24	44	68	71	6	2	2	4	0
2024–25	Tucson Roadrunners	AHL	47	2	11	13	12	3	0	0	0	0
2025–26	Tucson Roadrunners	AHL	55	5	7	12	58	—	—	—	—	—
DEL totals			38	2	9	11	24	5	0	0	0	0

=== International ===
Year	Team	Event	Result	GP	G	A	Pts	PIM
2021	Germany	U18	10th	4	0	1	1	4
2021	Germany	HG18	7th	4	2	0	2	2
2022	Germany	U18	8th	4	2	2	4	12
2023	Germany	WJC	8th	5	0	2	2	8
2024	Germany	WJC	9th	5	1	1	2	8
Junior totals				22	5	6	11	34
