= Sacha Boisvert =

Canadian ice hockey player (born 2006)

- Born: March 17, 2006 (age 20) Trois-Rivières, Quebec, Canada
- Height: 6 ft 2 in (188 cm)
- Weight: 176 lb (80 kg; 12 st 8 lb)
- Position: Centre
- Shoots: Left
- NHL team (P) Cur. team: Chicago Blackhawks; Rockford IceHogs (AHL)
- NHL draft: 18th overall, 2024; Chicago Blackhawks
- Playing career: 2026–present

Sacha Boisvert (born March 17, 2006) is a Canadian professional ice hockey player who is a centre for the Rockford IceHogs of the American Hockey League (AHL) as a prospect to the Chicago Blackhawks of the National Hockey League (NHL). He was selected 18th overall by the Blackhawks in the 2024 NHL entry draft.

== Playing career ==
During the 2022–23 season, Boisvert recorded 17 goals and 28 assists in 57 games for the Muskegon Lumberjacks and was named to the USHL All-Rookie second team. During the 2023–24 season, he recorded 36 goals and 32 assists in 61 regular games for the Lumberjacks. During the playoffs he recorded three assists in eight games. Following the season he was named to the All-USHL first team.

On June 28, 2024, he was drafted 18th overall by the Chicago Blackhawks in the 2024 NHL entry draft. Boisvert played his first year of college hockey at North Dakota and was named NCHC Rookie of the Year before transferring to Boston University for his sophomore season, which was marked by a significant drop in production.

Boisvert signed a three-year, entry-level contract with the Chicago Blackhawks and turned pro on March 16, 2026. On April 4, 2026, in his 5th career NHL game, Boisvert netted his first career NHL goal as he scored the game-winner in a 4-2 road victory against the Seattle Kraken.

== Career statistics ==
=== Regular season and playoffs ===
			Regular season					Playoffs
Season	Team	League	GP	G	A	Pts	PIM	GP	G	A	Pts	PIM
2022–23	Muskegon Lumberjacks	USHL	57	17	28	45	33	—	—	—	—	—
2023–24	Muskegon Lumberjacks	USHL	61	36	32	68	86	8	0	3	3	36
2024–25	University of North Dakota	NCHC	37	18	14	32	20	—	—	—	—	—
2025–26	Boston University	HE	26	3	14	17	28	—	—	—	—	—
2025–26	Chicago Blackhawks	NHL	7	1	1	2	9	—	—	—	—	—
NHL totals			7	1	1	2	9	—	—	—	—	—

=== International ===
Year	Team	Event	Result	GP	G	A	Pts	PIM
2022	Canada Red	U17	2nd place, silver medalist(s)	7	1	1	2	0
Junior totals				7	1	1	2	0

== Awards and honours ==
Award	Year
College
NCHC Rookie of the Year	2025
All-NCHC Rookie Team	2025
USHL
All-Rookie Second Team	2023
All-USHL Third Team	2024

Awards and achievements
Preceded by Artyom Levshunov	Chicago Blawkhawks first-round draft pick 2024	Succeeded by Marek Vanacker
Preceded by Zeev Buium	NCHC Rookie of the Year; 2024–25	Succeeded by Cole Reschny
