= Michael Hage =

Canadian ice hockey player (born 2006)

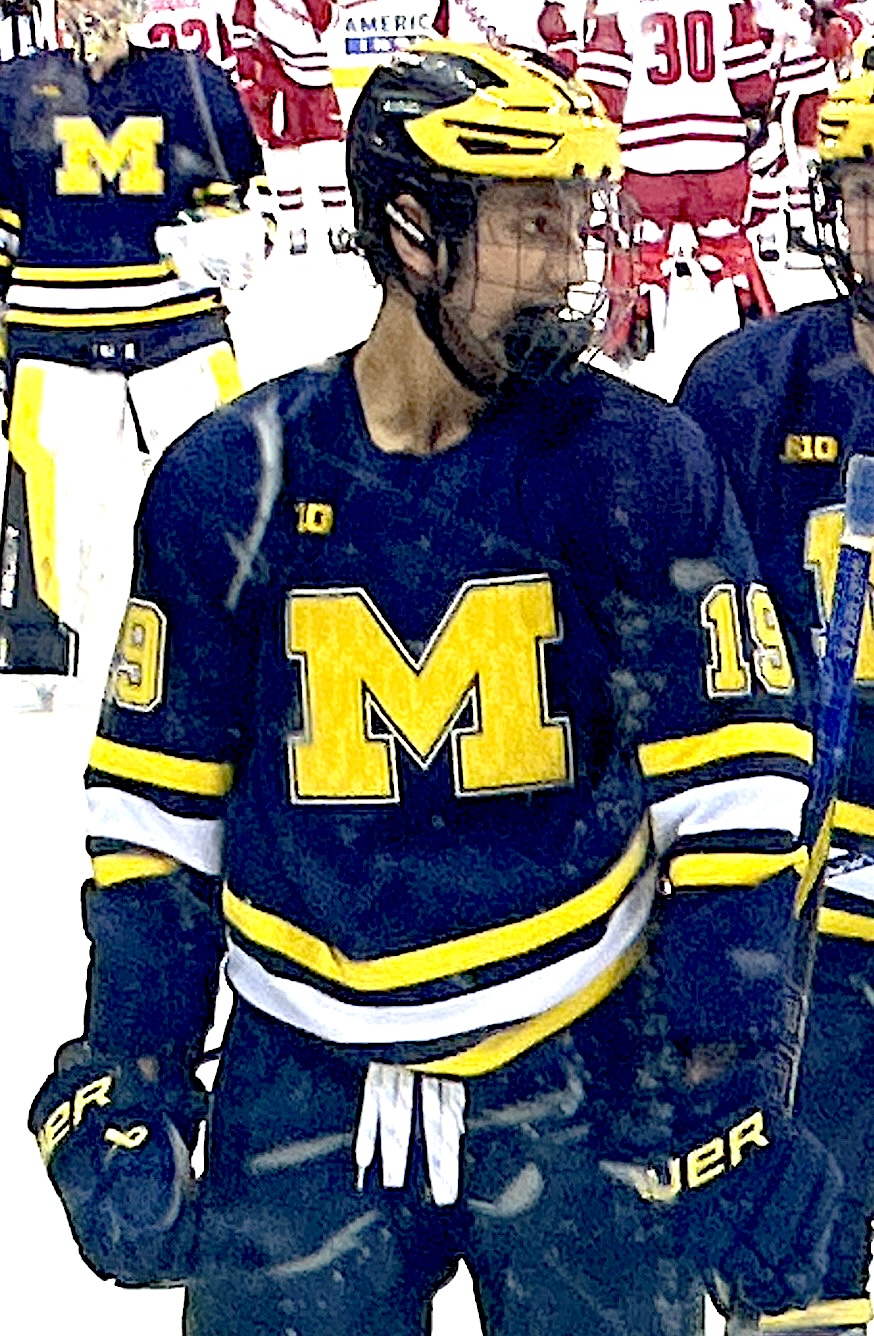
- Hage with Michigan in January 2025
- Born: April 14, 2006 (age 20) Mississauga, Ontario, Canada
- Height: 6 ft 1 in (185 cm)
- Weight: 200 lb (91 kg; 14 st 4 lb)
- Position: Centre
- Shoots: Right
- NCAA team: Michigan
- NHL draft: 21st overall, 2024; Montreal Canadiens

Michael Hage (born April 14, 2006) is a Canadian college ice hockey player who is a centre for the Michigan Wolverines of the National Collegiate Athletic Association (NCAA). He was selected in the first round, 21st overall, by the Montreal Canadiens in the 2024 NHL entry draft.

== Playing career ==
=== Early years ===
During the 2021–22 U16 AAA season, Hage recorded 46 goals and 70 assists in 57 games played for the Toronto Jr. Canadiens of the Greater Toronto Hockey League (GTHL). At that year's OHL Cup, Hage led his team in scoring with 16 points in seven games en route to a silver medal finish and was likewise selected to the tournament All-Star Team.

=== Junior ===
On April 20, 2022, Hage was drafted ninth overall by the Kitchener Rangers of the Ontario Hockey League (OHL) in the 2022 OHL Priority Selection draft. After not signing with the Rangers, he was declared a defected player, and his rights were traded to the Sudbury Wolves in exchange for a supplemental first-round pick in the 2023 OHL Priority Selection draft as compensation, Sudbury's fourth-round pick in the 2025 OHL Priority Selection draft, as well as three conditional draft picks.

On April 26, 2022, Hage signed with the Chicago Steel of the United States Hockey League (USHL) for the 2022–23 season. In September 2022, he suffered a torn labrum during his first practice with the team. Upon his return in March 2023, he recorded five goals and five assists in the Steel's final 13 games of the regular season.

During the 2023–24 season, Hage recorded 33 goals and 42 assists in 54 regular season games. His goal production ranked sixth whereas his total assists were tied for 10th across the USHL. He was named the USHL Forward of the Week for the period ending March 4, 2024, after he recorded two goals and five assists in three games. He was again recognized as the USHL Forward of the Week on March 18, after he recorded four goals and four assists in three games, his second such honour in a three-week span. Following the season, Hage was named to the All-USHL First Team.

In advance of the 2024 NHL entry draft, Hage received the E. J. McGuire Award of Excellence, bestowed by the NHL Central Scouting Bureau to "the candidate who best exemplifies commitment to excellence through strength of character, competitiveness, and athleticism." He was ultimately selected in the first round, 21st overall, by the Montreal Canadiens.

=== Collegiate ===
Hage committed to play collegiately for Michigan of the National Collegiate Athletic Association (NCAA) beginning in the 2024–25 season. On October 4, 2024, he recorded two assists in his NCAA debut against Minnesota State in a 5–2 loss, followed by an additional two-point effort, including his first collegiate goal, in a 4–1 victory a day later. On November 22, in a game against Penn State, he recorded two goals, including the game-winner, in his first career multi-goal game. The next day, he recorded one goal and four assists in a 10–6 victory. He finished the weekend series with a national-best seven points, and was subsequently named the Big Ten First Star of the Week. After registering five goals and five assist in seven games to lead all rookies in the nation with 1.43 points per game (PPG), Hage was recognized as the Hockey Commissioners Association (HCA) National Rookie of the Month. In January 2025, he, along with fellow Montreal Canadiens prospect Jacob Fowler, were longlisted as recipients of the Hobey Baker Award recognizing the top NCAA Division I men's ice hockey player. Hage finished his freshman year with 13 goals and 21 assists in 33 games. He ranked fourth among all rookies in the NCAA in points per game (1.03). Following the season he was named to the All-Big Ten Freshman Team, and was named Big Ten Freshman of the Year.

With the Wolverines failing to qualify for the annual NCAA tournament, Hage announced on March 25, 2025, that he would return to Michigan for the 2025–26 season. On October 3, during the first game of the season, he had a career-best five points with two goals and three assists. He led the nation in scoring during the weekend series with two goals and five assists, helping Michigan sweep Mercyhurst. He was subsequently named the Big Ten Second Star of the Week. During his sophomore year he recorded 13 goals and 39 assists in 39 games. He led the NCAA in assists and ranked third in points (52). Following the season he was named to the All-Big Ten Second Team. There had been some expectation that Hage would begin his professional career at the end of the collegiate season, but he instead announced that he would return to Michigan for a third year. His agent, Pat Brisson, explained that he wanted the opportunity to "take on more leadership and continue working on his physical and mental strength."

== International play ==
Medal record

Men's ice hockey

Representing Canada

World Junior Championships
| Bronze medal – third place | 2026 United States | |

Hage made his international debut for with the Canadian national junior team at the 2026 World Junior Championships. He led the tournament in scoring with two goals and 13 assists in seven games, playing a key role in Canada's eventual bronze medal win. Following the tournament he was named to the media All-Star Team. Hage's 15 points ranked ninth all-time for a Canadian junior player in a single tournament.

== Personal life ==
Hage is of Egyptian descent through his parents, Alain and Rania. Following his father's unexpected death resulting from a swimming pool accident in July 2023, Hage dedicated the ensuing 2023–24 season to his memory.

He has one sibling, a brother named Alexander.

== Career statistics ==
=== Regular season and playoff ===
| | | | Regular season | | | | | Playoffs |
| Season | Team | League | GP | G | A | Pts | PIM | GP | G | A | Pts | PIM |
|---|---|---|---|---|---|---|---|---|---|---|---|---|
| 2021–22 | Toronto Jr. Canadiens | GTHL | 57 | 46 | 70 | 116 | — | — | — | — | — | — |
| 2021–22 | Toronto Jr. Canadiens | OJHL | 1 | 2 | 2 | 4 | 0 | — | — | — | — | — |
| 2022–23 | Chicago Steel | USHL | 13 | 5 | 5 | 10 | 10 | 6 | 1 | 1 | 2 | 2 |
| 2023–24 | Chicago Steel | USHL | 54 | 33 | 42 | 75 | 53 | 2 | 2 | 2 | 4 | 19 |
| 2024–25 | University of Michigan | B1G | 33 | 13 | 21 | 34 | 23 | — | — | — | — | — |
| 2025–26 | University of Michigan | B1G | 39 | 13 | 39 | 52 | 14 | — | — | — | — | — |
| NCAA totals | | | 72 | 26 | 60 | 86 | 37 | — | — | — | — | — |

=== International ===
| Year | Team | Event | Result | GP | G | A | Pts | PIM |
|---|---|---|---|---|---|---|---|---|
| 2026 | Canada | WJC | 3rd place, bronze medalist(s) | 7 | 2 | 13 | 15 | 0 |
| Junior totals | | | | 7 | 2 | 13 | 15 | 0 |

== Awards and honours ==
| Award | Year | Ref |
GTHL
| OHL Cup All-Star Team | 2022 | |
USHL
| USA Hockey All-American Game | 2024 | |
| All-USHL First Team | 2024 | |
NHL
| E. J. McGuire Award of Excellence | 2024 | |
College
| Big Ten Freshman of the Year | 2025 | |
| All-Big Ten Second Team | 2026 | |
| All-Big Ten Freshman Team | 2025 | |
International
| World Junior Championship media All-Star team | 2026 | |

Awards and achievements
| Preceded by Ivan Demidov | Montreal Canadiens first-round draft pick 2024 | Succeeded by Gleb Pugachyov |
| Preceded by Artyom Levshunov | Big Ten Freshman of the Year; 2024–25 | Succeeded by Gavin McKenna |
