= Brett Skinner =

Canadian ice hockey player and coach

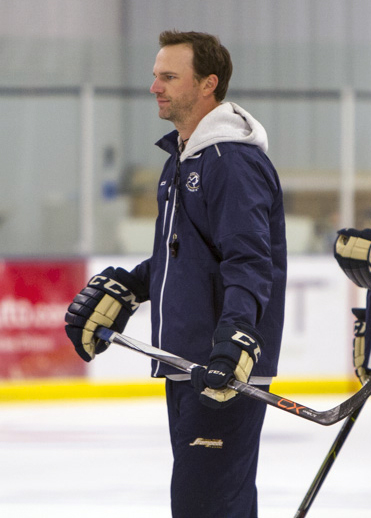
- Skinner with the Sioux Falls Stampede in 2017
- Born: June 28, 1983 (age 43) Brandon, Manitoba, Canada
- Height: 6 ft 1 in (185 cm)
- Weight: 200 lb (91 kg; 14 st 4 lb)
- Position: Defence
- Shot: Left
- Played for: New York Islanders; Amur Khabarovsk; Iserlohn Roosters; Tappara; Modo Hockey; Piráti Chomutov
- NHL draft: 68th overall, 2002; Vancouver Canucks
- Playing career: 2005–2017

Thomas Brett Skinner (born June 28, 1983) is a Canadian former professional ice hockey defenceman and current head coach of the Fargo Force of the United States Hockey League (USHL). He spent one season as the head coach of the Minnesota Wilderness of the North American Hockey League (NAHL) after serving five seasons as an assistant coach with the Sioux Falls Stampede of the USHL.

Skinner played professional hockey for eleven seasons between 2005 and 2017, appearing in over 400 games for the American Hockey League (AHL) for 10 different clubs, and briefly in the Kontinental Hockey League (KHL), National Hockey League (NHL) and overseas in the Czech Republic. Skinner was drafted by the Vancouver Canucks 68th overall in the 3rd round of the 2002 NHL entry draft.

== Playing career ==
Skinner was drafted by the Vancouver Canucks 68th overall in the 3rd round of the 2002 NHL entry draft. Brett was a member of the Trail Smoke Eaters in the BCHL in 2000–01, the Des Moines Buccaneers in the USHL in 2001–02, and then the University of Denver from 2002–2005. As a Denver Pioneer, he was a member of two NCAA national championship winning teams, was named an All-American in 2004–05. He was named team captain for what would have been his senior year at Denver (2005–06) but signed his first professional contract with the Canucks on August 30, 2005, and made his pro debut with affiliate, the Manitoba Moose of the AHL, in the 2005–06 season. At the trade deadline, Skinner was traded by the Canucks, along with a 2nd round pick to the Mighty Ducks of Anaheim for Keith Carney and Juha Alen on March 9, 2006. Despite being dealt, Skinner remained on loan with the Moose until the end of the season.

Skinner spent the 2006–07 season, playing with the Augusta Lynx, Portland Pirates and the Omaha Ak-Sar-Ben Knights. He was traded by the Ducks, along with Nathan Saunders, to the Boston Bruins for Mark Mowers just prior to the 2007–08 season on September 24, 2007. Skinner enjoyed a break out year with the Providence Bruins recording 47 points in 68 games and playing in the AHL All-Star game.

On July 3, 2008, Skinner was signed to a one-year contract by the New York Islanders. He was assigned to its affiliate, the Bridgeport Sound Tigers of the AHL, to start the 2008–09 season. When a rash of injuries hit the Islanders, Skinner was recalled and made his NHL debut in a 4-2 defeat against the New York Rangers on October 27, 2008. Skinner played 11 games with the Isles before he was returned to the Sound Tigers. On January 13, 2009, he was traded by the Islanders to the Atlanta Thrashers for Junior Lessard. He was then assigned to affiliate, the Chicago Wolves, where he remained for the rest of the season.

On July 8, 2009, Skinner signed a one-year contract with the Colorado Avalanche. He was assigned to the Avalanche's AHL affiliate, the Lake Erie Monsters, for 2009–10. Skinner scored 28 points in 73 games for the Monsters. During the season on January 22, 2010, Skinner was re-called but did not debut with the Avalanche.

Skinner left North America as a free agent and signed a one-year contract with the Russian team, Amur Khabarovsk, of the KHL on August 12, 2010.

In the 2011–12 season, Skinner journey-manned as he played for three different teams in three different leagues, the Iserlohn Roosters in Germany, Tappara in Finland and Modo Hockey in Sweden respectively.

Without substantial European interest, Skinner returned to North America and signed a one-year contract with the Allen Americans of the Central Hockey League on October 12, 2012. During the 2012–13 season, Skinner was leading the league in defensive scoring with 37 points in 28 games, before he was loaned to the American League's Grand Rapids Griffins on January 31, 2013. After three games with the Griffins he was signed to an AHL contract for the remainder of the season on February 7, 2013.

On September 2, 2014, Skinner signed abroad as a free agent to a one-year contract with KHL Chomutov of the second Czech division the, 1. národní hokejová liga.

== Career statistics ==
			Regular season					Playoffs
Season	Team	League	GP	G	A	Pts	PIM	GP	G	A	Pts	PIM
1999–2000	Brandon Wheat Kings AAA	MMHL	40	8	27	35	48	—	—	—	—	—
1999–2000	Portage Terriers	MJHL	3	0	1	1	0	—	—	—	—	—
2000–01	Trail Smoke Eaters	BCHL	59	11	24	35	43	—	—	—	—	—
2001–02	Des Moines Buccaneers	USHL	46	9	38	47	25	3	0	1	1	0
2002–03	University of Denver	WCHA	37	4	13	17	27	—	—	—	—	—
2003–04	University of Denver	WCHA	44	7	23	30	32	—	—	—	—	—
2004–05	University of Denver	WCHA	41	4	31	35	28	—	—	—	—	—
2005–06	Manitoba Moose	AHL	65	4	21	25	33	13	0	4	4	19
2006–07	Augusta Lynx	ECHL	5	1	3	4	8	—	—	—	—	—
2006–07	Portland Pirates	AHL	41	6	12	18	24	—	—	—	—	—
2006–07	Omaha Ak–Sar–Ben Knights	AHL	21	0	6	6	2	5	0	3	3	2
2007–08	Providence Bruins	AHL	68	7	40	47	47	10	0	1	1	0
2008–09	Bridgeport Sound Tigers	AHL	24	1	11	12	10	—	—	—	—	—
2008–09	New York Islanders	NHL	11	0	0	0	4	—	—	—	—	—
2008–09	Chicago Wolves	AHL	37	3	20	23	4	—	—	—	—	—
2009–10	Lake Erie Monsters	AHL	73	3	25	28	43	—	—	—	—	—
2010–11	Amur Khabarovsk	KHL	34	2	4	6	12	—	—	—	—	—
2011–12	Iserlohn Roosters	DEL	25	1	10	11	22	—	—	—	—	—
2011–12	Tappara	SM-liiga	7	0	3	3	6	—	—	—	—	—
2011–12	Modo Hockey	SEL	11	0	3	3	0	6	0	0	0	0
2012–13	Allen Americans	CHL	28	7	30	37	4	—	—	—	—	—
2012–13	Grand Rapids Griffins	AHL	33	4	13	17	12	21	0	6	6	6
2013–14	Norfolk Admirals	AHL	10	0	3	3	0	—	—	—	—	—
2013–14	Rockford IceHogs	AHL	38	1	9	10	8	—	—	—	—	—
2014–15	Piráti Chomutov	CZE.2	50	4	26	30	18	11	1	5	6	4
2015–16	Piráti Chomutov	ELH	36	3	7	10	6	8	3	0	3	16
2016–17	Piráti Chomutov	ELH	52	4	12	16	20	17	0	0	0	8
AHL totals			410	29	160	189	183	49	0	14	14	27
NHL totals			11	0	0	0	4	—	—	—	—	—

== Awards and honours ==
Award	Year
NCAA
WCHA First All-Star Team	2004–05
AHCA West Second-Team All-American	2004–05
All-NCAA All-Tournament Team	2005
USHL
Coach of the Year	2023–24
