= Hampton Slukynsky =

American ice hockey player (born 2005)

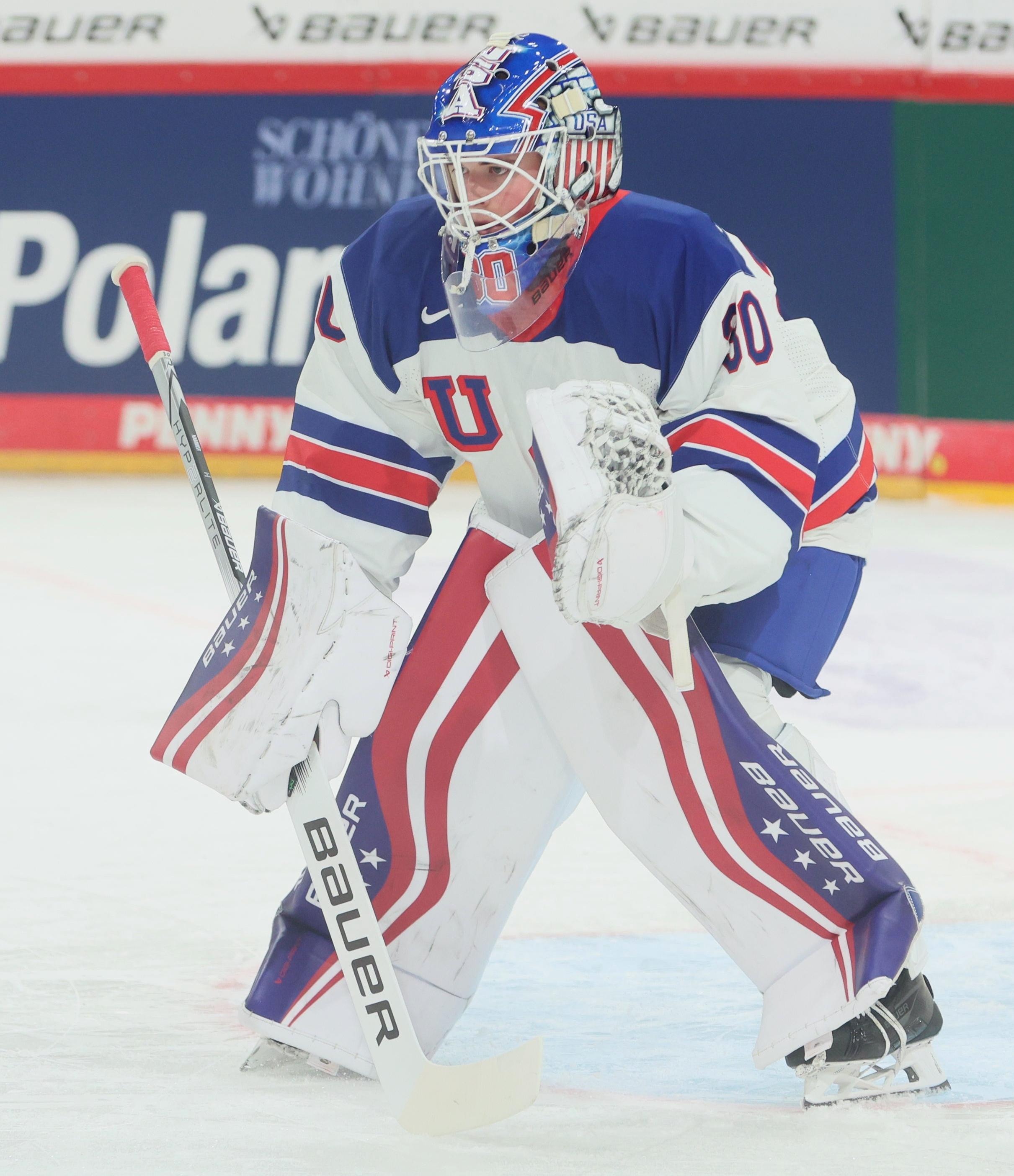
- Slukynsky with the United States at the 2025 World Junior Ice Hockey Championships
- Born: July 2, 2005 (age 21) Warroad, Minnesota, U.S.
- Height: 6 ft 2 in (188 cm)
- Weight: 185 lb (84 kg; 13 st 3 lb)
- Position: Goaltender
- Catches: Left
- NHL team (P) Cur. team: Los Angeles Kings; Greenville Swamp Rabbits (ECHL)
- NHL draft: 118th overall, 2023; Los Angeles Kings
- Playing career: 2026–present

Hampton Slukynsky (born July 2, 2005) is an American professional ice hockey goaltender playing for the Greenville Swamp Rabbits of the East Coast Hockey League (ECHL) while under contract to the Los Angeles Kings of the National Hockey League (NHL).

== Playing career ==
Slukynsky played high school hockey at Warroad High School, posting a stellar 54-5-2 record, a 1.47 goals against average, a .933 save percentage, and 16 shutouts, as well as taking his team to the state championship in his junior and senior year.

After graduating from high school, Slukynsky was drafted in the fourth round, along a 118th overall, by the Los Angeles Kings in the 2023 NHL entry draft.

=== Junior ===
Slukynsky played junior ice hockey for the Fargo Force of the United States Hockey League (USHL). During the 2023–24 season, he appeared in 33 games, and posted a 28–3–0 record, with a 1.86 goals against average (GAA), a .923 save percentage, and 5 shutouts during the regular season. During the playoffs, he posted a 9–3–0 with a 1.96 GAA and .931 save percentage and helped the Force win the Clark Cup. He led the league in all the major statistics, including, wins, shutouts, goals against average and save percentage. Following an outstanding season he was named to the All-USHL First team, and both the USHL Goaltender of the Year and Dave Peterson Goalie of the Year.

=== College ===
On June 19, 2024, Slukynsky committed to play college ice hockey at Western Michigan. He was originally committed to play at Northern Michigan, however, he changed his commitment after former Wildcat head coach, Grant Potulny, left the program and was named head coach for the Hartford Wolf Pack of the American Hockey League (AHL).

During the 2024–25 season, in his freshman year, he appeared in 25 games, and posted a 19–5–3 record, with a 1.90 GAA and a .922 save percentage. He led the National Collegiate Hockey Conference (NCHC) in GAA, and set the program's single-season record for GAA. Following the season he was named to the All-NCHC Rookie Team and All-NCHC Second Team. He was also named a finalist for the NCHC Goaltender of the Year. During the 2025 NCAA Division I men's ice hockey tournament, Slukynsky allowed only six goals in four games and helped Western Michigan win their first national championship in program history. He was subsequently named to the NCAA All-Tournament Team.

=== Professional ===
Slukynsky signed a three-year, entry level contract beginning in the 2026–27 season with the Los Angeles Kings on April 2, 2026, and reported to the Ontario Reign on an amateur try-out contract for the remainder of the 2025–26 AHL season.

== International play ==
Medal record

Representing United States

Ice hockey

World Championships
Gold medal – first place	2025 Sweden/Denmark	

World Junior Championships
Gold medal – first place	2025 Canada	

World U18 Championships
Gold medal – first place	2023 Switzerland	

Slukynsky represented the United States at the 2023 IIHF World U18 Championships where he appeared in one game and won a gold medal. On December 19, 2024, he was named to the United States men's national junior ice hockey team to compete at the 2025 World Junior Ice Hockey Championships. During the tournament he appeared in two games, and posted a 2–0–0 record, with a .933 save percentage and 1.50 GAA, and won a gold medal. He stopped 42 of 45 shots he faced against Latvia and Switzerland.

On April 24, 2025, he was named to the United States men's national ice hockey team to compete at the 2025 IIHF World Championship, where he made his senior national team debut.

== Personal life ==
Slukynsky was born to Tim and Jenny Slukynsky. His older brother, Grant, also played college ice hockey at Western Michigan after transferring from Northern Michigan.

== Career statistics ==
=== Regular season and playoffs ===
Bold indicates led league

			Regular season									Playoffs
Season	Team	League	GP	W	L	T/OTL	MIN	GA	SO	GAA	SV%	GP	W	L	MIN	GA	SO	GAA	SV%
2021–22	Warroad High	USHS	**25**	21	3	1	**1,297**	40	8	1.57	.931	6	5	1	326	10	1	1.51	.923
2022–23	Warroad High	USHS	**24**	**23**	0	1	**1,238**	33	8	1.38	.947	6	5	1	326	12	1	1.87	.903
2023–24	Fargo Force	USHL	33	**28**	3	0	1,938	60	**5**	**1.86**	**.923**	**12**	**9**	3	**712**	20	1	**1.69**	.931
2024–25	Western Michigan University	NCHC	25	19	5	1	1,579	50	1	1.90	.922	—	—	—	—	—	—	—	—
2025–26	Western Michigan University	NCHC	39	**27**	11	1	2,352	90	0	2.30	.915	—	—	—	—	—	—	—	—
2025–26	Ontario Reign	AHL	2	2	0	0	120	2	0	1.00	.957	—	—	—	—	—	—	—	—
2026–27	Ontario Reign	AHL	4	0	4	0	223	14	0	3.60	.878	—	—	—	—	—	—	—	—
AHL totals			6	2	4	0	343	16	0	2.80	.900	—	—	—	—	—	—	—	—

=== International ===
Year	Team	Event	Result	GP	W	L	T	MIN	GA	SO	GAA	SV%
2022	United States	HG18	5th	2	1	1	0	114	4	0	2.11	.925
2023	United States	U18	1st place, gold medalist(s)	1	1	0	0	7	0	0	0.00	1.000
2025	United States	WJC	1st place, gold medalist(s)	2	2	0	0	120	3	0	1.50	.933
Junior totals				5	4	1	0	241	7	0	1.74	.932

== Awards and honors ==
Award	Year
All-USHL First Team	2024
USHL Goaltender of the Year	2024
Dave Peterson Goalie of the Year	2024
College
All-NCHC Rookie Team	2025
All-NCHC Second Team	2025, 2026
