= Fargo Force =

Junior ice hockey team

- City: Fargo, North Dakota
- League: United States Hockey League
- Conference: West
- Founded: 2008
- Home arena: Scheels Arena
- Colors: Black, grey, white
- Owners: Brandt Holdings; Matt Cullen(minority); Bell Bank(minority)
- General manager: Cary Eades
- Head coach: Brett Skinner
- Media: KVLY-DT3; KRWK
- Website: fargoforce.com

Franchise history
- 2008–present: Fargo Force

Championships
- Playoff championships: 2 (2018, 2024)

The Fargo Force is a junior ice hockey team in the Western Conference of the United States Hockey League (USHL). The Force have won two league championships in 2018 and 2024 and was awarded USHL Organization of the Year for 2008–09 and 2012–13.

== History ==
In early 2007, Fargo was granted a USHL team, intended as an anchor tenant for the then-under-construction Urban Plains Center and owned by local businessman Ace Brandt. Dean Blais, former coach of the North Dakota Fighting Sioux hockey program, was hired as the franchise's initial coach and general manager. After a name-the-team contest, the choices were narrowed to Fargo Force, Fargo Phantoms, and Fargo Fire. Twelve people submitted the Force name; as a result, they won a dinner with head coach Dean Blais and each received two season tickets to the Force's inaugural season.

As a result of the Force's entry, the area's previous hockey team, the Fargo-Moorhead Jets of the North American Hockey League announced they were leaving the area in April 2008, and folded later that year.

Marks retired following the 2014–15 season and was replaced by former University of North Dakota player/assistant coach Cary Eades, who had just led the Sioux Falls Stampede to the 2014–15 Clark Cup Championship. In 2018, Fargo won the Clark Cup Finals over the Youngstown Phantoms to win their first championship in team history. Following the 2018–19 season, Eades stepped down from his coaching position, retaining the general manager title, and associate coach Pierre-Paul Lamoureux was named head coach. Lamoureux left after the 2020–21 season and was replaced by Scott Langer who had spent the previous five seasons with the North American Hockey League's Aberdeen Wings. On October 16, 2021, owner Ace Brandt died of cancer.

== Season-by-season records ==
Note: GP = Games played, W = Wins, L = Losses, OTL = Overtime Losses, Pts = Points, GF = Goals For, GA = Goals Against

Season	GP	W	L	OTL	Pts	GF	GA	PIM	Finish	Playoffs
2008–09	60	32	23	5	69	191	166	1135	3rd, Western Conf.	Won quarterfinals, 3–0 vs. Omaha Lancers; Won semifinals, 3–0 vs. Lincoln Stars; Lost Clark Cup Finals, 1–3 vs. Indiana Ice
2009–10	60	37	17	6	80	227	214	1474	2nd Western Conf.	Won quarterfinals, 3–0 vs. Sioux Falls Stampede; Won semifinals, 3–2 vs. Omaha Lancers; Lost Clark Cup Finals, 2–3 vs. Green Bay Gamblers
2010–11	60	33	22	5	71	173	151	1201	4th, Western Conf.	Won conf. quarterfinals, 2–0 vs. Lincoln Stars; Lost conf. semifinals, 0–3 vs. Dubuque Fighting Saints
2011–12	60	31	23	6	68	188	160	1007	4th, Western Conf.	Won conf. quarterfinals, 2–0 vs. Sioux City Musketeers; Lost conf. semifinals, 1–3 vs. Lincoln Stars
2012–13	64	38	19	7	83	201	187	981	2nd, Western Conf.	Won conf. semifinals, 3–2 vs. Waterloo Black Hawks; Won conf. finals, 3–2 vs. Sioux Falls Stampede; Lost Clark Cup Finals, 0–3 vs. Dubuque Fighting Saints
2013–14	60	14	39	7	35	122	229	1275	8th, Western Conf.	did not qualify
2014–15	60	26	28	6	58	148	191	933	6th, Western Conf.	did not qualify
2015–16	60	32	26	2	66	157	150	995	5th, Western Conf.	did not qualify
2016–17	60	36	19	4	77	193	149	792	3rd, Western Conf.	Lost conf. semifinals, 0–3 vs. Waterloo Black Hawks
2017–18	60	37	16	7	81	208	133	985	3rd, Western Conf.	Won first round, 2–0 vs. Tri-City Storm; Won conf. semifinals, 3–1 vs. Omaha Lancers; Won conf. finals, 3–1 vs. Waterloo Black Hawks; Won Clark Cup Championship, 3–1 vs. Youngstown Phantoms
2018–19	62	34	23	5	73	188	172	910	5th, Western Conf.	Lost first round, 0–2 vs. Des Moines Buccaneers
2019–20	48	27	15	6	60	153	143	847	3rd, Western Conf.	Season cancelled
2020–21	54	31	21	3	63	169	148	830	4th, Western Conf.	Won conf. semifinals, 2–1 vs. Tri-City Storm; Won conf. finals, 2–0 vs. Sioux City Musketeers; Lost Clark Cup finals, 1–3 vs. Chicago Steel
2021–22	62	28	28	4	62	187	207	989	5th, Western Conf.	Lost first round, 2-0 vs. Omaha Lancers
2022–23	62	40	14	4	88	230	159	895	1st, West Conf.	Won conf. semifinals, 2-0 vs. Tri-City Storm; Won conf. finals, 3-1 vs. Lincoln Stars; Lost Clark Cup finals, 3-0 vs. Youngstown Phantoms
2023–24	62	50	10	2	102	272	143	579	1st, West Conf.	Won conf. semifinals, 3-0 vs. Tri-City Storm; Won conf. finals, 3-2 vs. Sioux Falls Stampede; Won Clark Cup Championship, 3-1 vs. Dubuque Fighting Saints

== Notable players ==
=== NHL draft picks ===
Notable Fargo Force players picked in the NHL draft:

Year drafted	Player	Drafted team	Pick
2008	Luke Witkowski	Tampa Bay Lightning	6th round, 160th overall
2009	Mike Lee	Arizona Coyotes	3rd round, 91st overall
2010	Zane McIntyre	Boston Bruins	6th round, 165th overall
2012	Ben Johnson	New Jersey Devils	3rd round, 90th overall
2012	Dominic Toninato	Toronto Maple Leafs	5th round, 126th overall
2013	Teemu Kivihalme	Nashville Predators	5th round, 140th overall
2013	Jonny Brodzinski	Los Angeles Kings	5th round, 148th overall
2016	Riley Tufte	Dallas Stars	1st round, 25th overall
2025	Mason West	Chicago Blackhawks	1st round, 29th overall

=== Awards and player recognition ===
- Mac Swanson – 2023–24 USHL Player of the Year, Forward of the Year
- Leo Gruba – 2023–24 Defenseman of the Year
- Hampton Slukynsky – 2023–24 Goaltender of the Year
- Brett Skinner – 2023–24 Coach of the Year
- Cary Eades – 2023–24 General Manager of the Year
- Cole Knuble – 2022–23 Curt Hammer Award, Dave Tyler Junior Player of the Year Award
- Nick Oliver – 2022–23 Coach of the Year
- Jack Adams – 2016–17 All-USHL Team, 2016-17 USHL Most Goals
- Ryan Bischel – 2017 U.S. Junior Select Team
- Dean Blais – 2008–09 USHL Coach of the Year
- Hank Crone – 2016 U.S. Junior Select Team,
- Cary Eades – 1991–92 USHL General Manager of the Year, 2012–13 USHL Coach of the Year
- Ty Farmer – 2017–18 All-USHL Team
- Teemu Kivihalme – 2013 U.S. Junior Select Team
- Mike Lee – 2008–09 USHL Goaltender of the Year
- Blake Lizotte – 2016–17 All-USHL Team, 2016 U.S. Junior Select Team
- Michael Mancinelli – 2017–18 USHL All-Rookie Team
- Strauss Mann – 2017–18 All-USHL Team
- Ben Meyers – 2018–19 All-USHL Team
- Zane McIntyre – 2011–12 USHL Goaltender of the Year
- Josh Nodler – 2018 U.S. Junior Select Team 2018–19 USHL All-Rookie Team
- Ryan O'Reilly – 2017–18 USHL All-Rookie Team, 2018 U.S. Junior Select Team
- Clayton Phillips – 2016–17 USHL All-Rookie Team
- Nate Schmidt – 2009–10 USHL All-Rookie Team
- Jacob Schmidt-Svejstrup – 2017–18 All-USHL Team
- Denis Smirnov – 2015–16 All-USHL Team
- Anthony Taranto – 2008–09 All-USHL Team

=== Prospects games participants ===
- Jack Adams – 2017 USHL/NHL Top Prospects Game
- Kaden Bohlsen – 2019 USHL/NHL Top Prospects Game
- Charlie Dovorany – 2017 USHL/NHL Top Prospects Game
- Mikey Eyssimont – 2015 USHL/NHL Top Prospects Game
- Cedric Fiedler – 2019 USHL/NHL Top Prospects Game
- Gabe Guertler – 2013 USHL/NHL Top Prospects Game
- Brendan Harms – 2013 USHL/NHL Top Prospects Game
- Matthew Kessel – 2018 USHL/NHL Top Prospects Game
- Josh Nodler – 2019 USHL/NHL Top Prospects Game
- Ryan O'Reilly – 2017 CCM/USA Hockey All-American Prospects Game, 2018 USHL/NHL Top Prospects Game
- Clayton Phillips – 2016 CCM/USA Hockey All-American Prospects Game, 2017 USHL/NHL Top Prospects Game
- Ryan Savage – 2017 CCM/USA Hockey All-American Prospects Game, 2018 USHL/NHL Top Prospects Game
- Nate Schmidt – 2010 USHL All-Star Game
- Jacob Schmidt-Svejstrup – 2018 USHL/NHL Top Prospects Game
- Denis Smirnov – 2015 USHL/NHL Top Prospects Game
- Riley Tufte – 2015 CCM/USA Hockey All-American Prospects Game
- Luke Witkowski – 2009 USHL All-Star Game
