= Covelli Centre =

Arena in Ohio, United States

Coordinates: 41.096145°N 80.647943°W

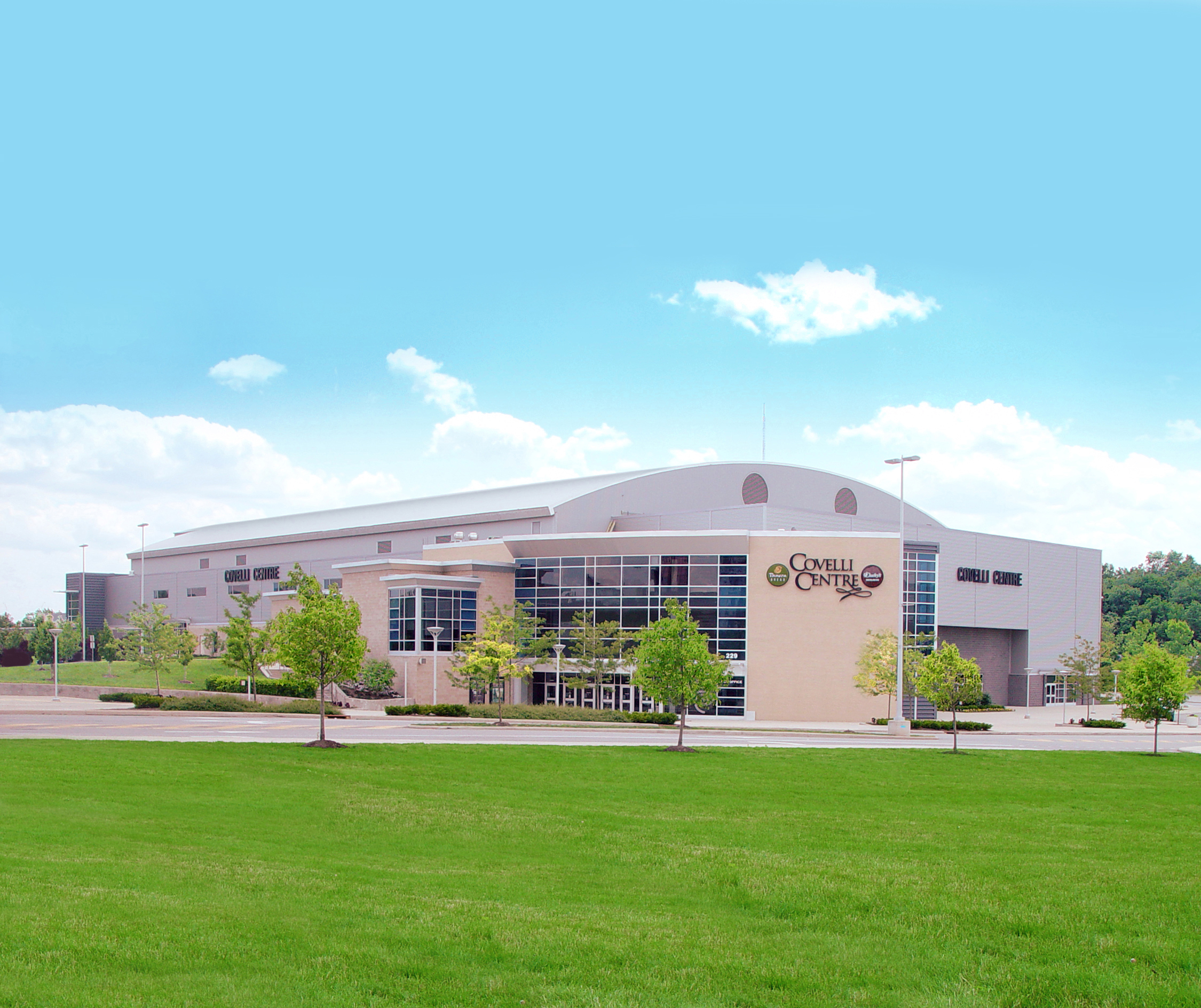
- Covelli Centre, Youngstown, Ohio

- Location within Ohio Location within the United States
- Former names: Youngstown Convocation Center (planning/construction); Chevrolet Centre (2005–09)
- Location: 229 East Front Street; Youngstown, Ohio 44503
- Owner: City of Youngstown
- Operator: JAC Management Group
- Capacity: Basketball: 5,900; Ice Hockey/Arena football: 5,717; Concerts: 7,000

Construction
- Groundbreaking: June 21, 2004
- Opened: October 19, 2005
- Cost: $42 million ($69.2 million in 2025 dollars)
- Architects: PBK Architects, Ltd.
- Project manager: Frew Nations Group
- Structural engineers: Cochrane Group, Inc.
- Services engineers: Murray & Associates, Inc.
- General contractors: Hunt/B&B Contractors & Developers Inc./AP O'Horo

Tenants
- Youngstown SteelHounds (CHL) (2005–2008); Mahoning Valley Thunder (AF2) (2007–2009); Youngstown Phantoms (USHL) (2009–present)

The Covelli Centre is a multi-purpose arena in Youngstown, Ohio, United States. It opened in 2005 and is home to the Youngstown Phantoms of the United States Hockey League. It also hosts concerts and other convocation events.

== History ==
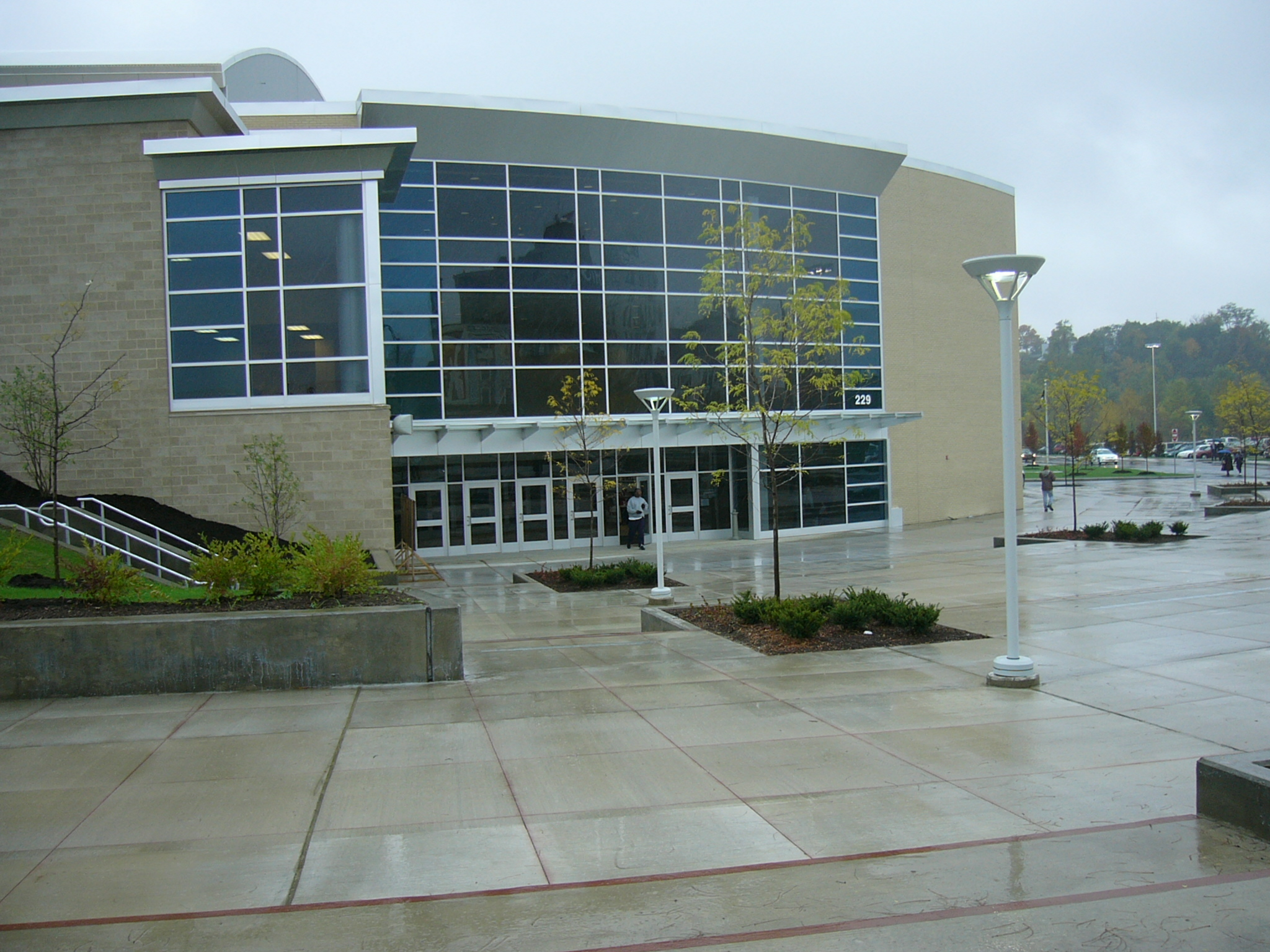
The main entrance to the Covelli Centre

The Covelli Centre was funded primarily through a $26 million federal grant secured in 2000 by then-Congressman James Traficant. The arena's grand opening was on October 29, 2005, when it hosted a concert by 3 Doors Down. The first hockey game was played about a week later, on November 4. It was initially named the Convocation Center before the naming rights were bought by General Motors, who called it the Chevrolet Centre. GM's naming rights expired in 2008, and restaurant franchisee Covelli Enterprises bought the naming rights the following year.

Starting in November 2008, the Youngstown Phantoms of the North American Hockey League played select home games at the arena. Upon joining the USHL, the Phantoms moved into the Covelli Centre full-time in 2009. The Ohio Junior High wrestling championships were held at the arena in 2019.

The facility was utilized to house the "Mercy Health Covelli Field Hospital," an additional medical space for COVID-19 patients during the COVID-19 pandemic.

October 12, 2026, President Donald Trump hosted a midterm campaign rally at the Covelli Centre in support of Ohio Republicans. An incident of some Trump supporters allegedly assaulted a heckler at the event went viral. An AI Generated photo of the alleged assault also went viral.

== Records ==
The arena's first sold-out performances were on November 12, 2005, when it hosted two concerts by the Trans-Siberian Orchestra. Both 2:30 and 7:30 shows were sold out. The first sold-out hockey game was on January 14, 2006.

On March 8, 2010, it was announced that the Covelli Centre would host Elton John on May 1, 2010. The event sold out in a record time of 30 minutes on March 12, 2010, which eclipsed the previous record set by Carrie Underwood, an event that sold out in 48 hours.

== Selected events ==
- October 22, 2005 – Youngstown Convocation Center open house
- October 29, 2005 – 3 Doors Down, Shinedown & Alter Bridge (first event)
- October 30, 2005 – Tony Bennett
- November 4, 2005 – First Steelhounds game
- November 12, 2005 – Trans-Siberian Orchestra (First sold-out event)
- November 23, 2005 – Lil Jon
- November 27, 2005 – Clay Aiken
- December 28–31, 2005 – Disney on Ice
- January 14, 2006 – First sold out Steelhounds game
- January 19, 2006 – Larry the Cable Guy
- April 4, 2006 – Korn, Mudvayne & 10 Years
- April 10, 2006 – John Mellencamp
- On June 30, 2006 – Slayer, Mastodon & Lamb of God were scheduled to play here. Unfortunately, the show was moved to Cleveland.
- July 5, 2006 – Shinedown & Evans Blue
- September 12, 2007 – Staind, Crossfade, Three Days Grace & Black Stone Cherry
- On February 13, 2007 – Slayer backed out of another Youngstown show that was moved to Cleveland.
- March 31, 2007 – First Mahoning Valley Thunder game
- April 5, 2007 – Ludacris presented by Youngstown State University
- July 1, 2007 – Tool
- July 3, 2007 – Stevie Nicks
- August 7, 2007 – WWE Smackdown & ECW (Sold Out)
- June 11, 2008 – Carrie Underwood, with special guest Jason Michael Carroll (Sold Out)
- October 18, 2008 – "Hot Ice--Cool Sounds", Skating Show with music by Peter Cetera and the Cleveland Pops Orchestra & was shown on NBC, on December 25, 2008.
- October 29, 2008 – Rock the Vote featuring Beastie Boys and Sheryl Crow
- November 22, 2008 – Avenged Sevenfold, Buckcherry, Shinedown & Saving Abel.
- February 21, 2009 – Boxing: Kelly Pavlik vs. Marco Antonio Rubio (Sold Out)
- May 9, 2009 – WWE "Raw Live", featuring John Cena, Batista, Big Show & Randy Orton (Sold Out)
- July 25, 2009 – Last Mahoning Valley Thunder game
- July 29, 2009 – Pedal to The metal tour Mudvayne, Black Label Society, Static-X, Suicide Silence, Bury Your Dead
- August 15, 2009 – Journey and Heart
- October 8, 2009 – Jeff Dunham
- October 17, 2009 – Kelly Clarkson
- November 4, 2009 – Daughtry
- November 12, 2009 – Gaither Vocal Band
- February 2, 2010 – Shinedown, Puddle of Mudd & Skillet
- March 18, 2010 – Breaking Benjamin, Chevelle, Red & Thousand Foot Krutch
- May 1, 2010 – Elton John (Sold out in 30 minutes)
- June 26, 2010 – WWE Raw World Tour
- September 18, 2010 – Montgomery Gentry
- October 9, 2010 – Rob Zombie and Alice Cooper
- April 12, 2011 – Goo Goo Dolls
- May 6, 2011 – Tim McGraw
- May 22, 2011 – Lynyrd Skynyrd and ZZ Top
- July 29, 2011 – Mötley Crüe and Poison
- October 7, 2011 – Gaither Homecoming 2011 Tour
- December 7, 2011 – Guns N' Roses with special guest Black Label Society (featuring Zakk Wylde)
- April 6, 2012 – Sugarland
- December 7, 2012 – First college basketball game: Youngstown State University vs. Hiram College
- November 16, 2013 – Justin Moore, Randy Houser and Josh Thompson
- February 1, 2014 – Elton John
- March 22, 2016 – Elton John (Wonderful Crazy Night Tour)
- August 26, 2016 – Kiss
- July 25, 2017 – Donald Trump Make America Great Again Rally
- September 15, 2017 – Stevie Nicks
- December 2, 2017 – Migos
- August 5, 2018 – Rough n Rowdy 4 (boxing)
- March 5, 2019 – Shinedown With Papa Roach and Asking Alexandria
- May 20, 2019 – Slayer Final Tour With Lamb of God, Cannibal Corpse, and Amon Amarth
- August 21, 2019 – Hall & Oates
- October 10, 2019 – Ghost With Nothing More
- November 27, 2019 – Five Finger Death Punch With Three Days Grace, Bad Wolves, and Fire from the Gods
- December 21, 2019 – West Virginia vs. YSU men's basketball
- February 26, 2022 – WWE Road to Wrestlemania
- September 17, 2022 – Donald Trump Save America Rally
- June 15, 2024 – AEW Collision
- October 12, 2026 – Donald Trump Midterm Rally

| Preceded by first arena | Home of the Mahoning Valley Thunder; 2007 – 2009 | Succeeded by current |
