= Ice Box (arena) =

Multi-purpose arena in Lincoln, Nebraska

Coordinates: 40°49′58″N 96°41′50″W

The Ice Box
- Location within Nebraska Location within the United States
- Location: 1800 Transformation Drive; Lincoln, Nebraska
- Owner: University of Nebraska–Lincoln
- Operator: Lincoln Stars
- Capacity: 4,212 (2015–present) List: 4,231 (1996–1998); 5,010 (1998–mid-2000s); 4,610 (mid-2000s–2015)
- Surface: Multi-surface

Construction
- Opened: 1951
- Renovated: 1996
- Expanded: 1998
- Closed: 2031 (planned)
- Architects: Ayars & Ayars

Tenants
- Lincoln Stars (USHL) (1996–present); No Coast Roller Derby (WFTDA) (2015–present)

The Ice Box is a multi-purpose arena on the campus of the University of Nebraska–Lincoln in Lincoln, Nebraska. It has a listed capacity of 4,212 and primarily serves as the home venue of the Lincoln Stars of the United States Hockey League.

== Lincoln Stars ==
Constructed in 1951 as a livestock arena on the grounds of the Nebraska State Fair, the venue was adapted for ice hockey when the expansion Lincoln Stars joined the United States Hockey League in 1996. The Stars were highly successful in their first decade, often filling the Ice Box beyond its listed capacity and selling out every game from 1996 until 2002. Though still strong compared to the rest of the league, attendance numbers have dropped as the team's success faded. The Ice Box's fans and overall atmosphere have been praised as the USHL's best.

In 2008, the university acquired the Ice Box and state fairgrounds in a ceremonial transaction with the City of Lincoln; though the arena was spared, the fairgrounds were demolished to make room for Nebraska Innovation Campus. The Ice Box is leased to the Stars until 2031, at which time it is recommended for demolition, with mixed-use or research facilities to be constructed on the site.

== Other tenants ==
The University of Nebraska–Lincoln does not sponsor a varsity men's or women's ice hockey program, but its men's club team used the Ice Box to practice until the John Breslow Ice Hockey Center opened in 2015. Despite initial speculation the Stars may also move to the Breslow Center, team officials stated the 1,500-seat venue "just wouldn’t fit our needs."

No Coast Roller Derby, a co-ed flat track roller derby league, has hosted events at the Ice Box since 2015.

Until 2008, the Ice Box's ice surface was removed during summer and early fall months to accommodate state fair events. The arena is occasionally used to host small concerts and student events.
