= List of American films of 1977 =

This is a list of American films released in 1977.

== Box office ==
The highest-grossing American films released in 1977, by domestic box office gross revenue, are as follows:

Highest-grossing films of 1977
Rank	Title	Distributor	Domestic gross
1	Star Wars	20th Century Fox	$221,280,994
2	Smokey and the Bandit	Universal	$126,737,428
3	Close Encounters of the Third Kind	Columbia	$116,395,460
4	Saturday Night Fever	Paramount	$94,213,184
5	The Goodbye Girl	MGM / Warner Bros.	$83,700,000
6	A Bridge Too Far	United Artists	$50,750,000
7	The Deep	Columbia	$47,346,365
8	The Spy Who Loved Me	United Artists	$46,838,673
9	Oh, God!	Warner Bros.	$41,687,243
10	Annie Hall	United Artists	$38,251,425

== January–March ==
Opening		Title	Production company	Cast and crew	Ref.
J A N U A R Y	7	The Sentinel	Universal Pictures	James B. Harris (director); Jeffrey Konvitz (screenplay); Chris Sarandon, Cristina Raines, José Ferrer, Martin Balsam, Ava Gardner, John Carradine, Arthur Kennedy, Burgess Meredith, Sylvia Miles, Deborah Raffin, Eli Wallach, Christopher Walken, Jerry Orbach, Beverly D'Angelo, Hank Garrett, Nana Visitor, Tom Berenger, William Hickey, Jeff Goldblum	
J A N U A R Y	18	Pumping Iron	Cinema 5 / White Mountain Films	George Butler (director/screenplay); Charles Gaines (screenplay); Arnold Schwarzenegger, Lou Ferrigno, Franco Columbu, Mike Katz, Ken Waller, Ed Corney, Serge Nubret	
J A N U A R Y	21	Scalpel	United International Pictures / PJ Productions	John Grissmer (director/screenplay); Robert Lansing, Judith Chapman, Sandy Martin, Arlen Dean Snyder, David Scarroll, Muriel Moore, Stan Wojno, Laura Whyte, Larry Quackenbush, Mimi Honce	
J A N U A R Y	25	Providence	Cinema 5 Distributing	Alain Resnais (director); David Mercer (screenplay); Dirk Bogarde, Ellen Burstyn, John Gielgud, David Warner, Elaine Stritch, Cyril Luckham, Denis Lawson, Kathryn Leigh Scott, Milo Sperber, Anna Wing, Peter Arne, Tanya Lopert	
J A N U A R Y	28	The Late Show	Warner Bros.	Robert Benton (director/screenplay); Rodolfo Sonego (screenplay); Art Carney, Lily Tomlin, Bill Macy, Eugene Roche, Joanna Cassidy, John Considine, Ruth Nelson, Howard Duff, John Davey	
F E B R U A R Y	4	Raw Deal	Greater Union / Homestead Films	Russell Hagg (director); Patrick Edgeworth (screenplay); Gerard Kennedy, Gus Mercurio, Rod Mullinar, Christopher Pate, Hu Pryce, John Cousins, Michael Carman, Norman Yemm, Gary Day, Briony Behets	
F E B R U A R Y	9	Fun with Dick and Jane	Columbia Pictures	Ted Kotcheff (director); David Giler, Jerry Belson, Mordecai Richler (screenplay); George Segal, Jane Fonda, Ed McMahon, Dick Gautier, Allan Miller, Hank Garcia, John Dehner, Mary Jackson, Walter Brooke, Sean Frye, Fred Willard, Thayer David, Burke Byrnes, Dewayne Jesse, Anne Ramsey, Jon Christian Erickson, Gloria Stroock, Thalmus Rasulala, Jay Leno	
F E B R U A R Y	9	Twilight's Last Gleaming	Allied Artists / Lorimar Productions	Robert Aldrich (director); Ronald M. Cohen (screenplay); Burt Lancaster, Richard Widmark, Charles Durning, Paul Winfield, Burt Young, Melvyn Douglas, Joseph Cotten, Richard Jaeckel, Roscoe Lee Browne, William Marshall, Gerald S. O'Loughlin, Leif Erickson, Charles Aidman, Charles McGraw, William Smith, Simon Scott, Morgan Paull, Bill Walker, Ed Bishop, Phil Brown, Don Fellows, Garrick Hagon, David Healy, William Hootkins, Ray Jewers, John Ratzenberger, Lionel Murton, Shane Rimmer, Mark Russell, M. Phil Senini, David Baxt, Glenn Beck, Gary Cockrell, Weston Gavin, Elizabeth Halliday, Thomasine Heiner, Ron Lee, Robert Sherman, Robert MacLeod, Robert O'Neil, Pamela Roland, Rich Steber, Drew W. Wesche, Kent O. Doering, Allan Dean Moore, Rich Demarest, Gary Harper	
F E B R U A R Y	9	Wizards	20th Century Fox / Bakshi Productions	Ralph Bakshi (director/screenplay); Bob Holt, Jesse Welles, Richard Romanus, David Proval, Steve Gravers, Mark Hamill, Susan Tyrrell, Ralph Bakshi, James Connell, Angelo Grisanti	
F E B R U A R Y	11	Fire Sale	20th Century Fox	Alan Arkin (director); Robert Klane (screenplay); Alan Arkin, Rob Reiner, Vincent Gardenia, Anjanette Comer, Kay Medford, Sid Caesar, Byron Stewart, Alex Rocco, Oliver Clark, Barbara Dana	
F E B R U A R Y	11	In Search of Noah's Ark	Sunn Classic Pictures	James L. Conway (director/screenplay); Charles E. Sellier Jr. (screenplay); Brad Crandall, Vern Adix	
F E B R U A R Y	11	Thieves	Paramount Pictures / Brut Productions	John Berry (director); Herb Gardner (screenplay); Marlo Thomas, Charles Grodin, Irwin Corey, Héctor Elizondo, Mercedes McCambridge, John McMartin, Gary Merrill, Ann Wedgeworth, Larry B. Scott, Bob Fosse, Norman Matlock, Ian Martin, Janet Colazzo, Kenneth Kimmins, Santos Morales, MacIntyre Dixon, Bill Lazarus, Alice Drummond, Zvee Scooler, Craig Barrie, Victor Le Guillow, Lee Wallace, Jess Osuna, Joan Kaye	
F E B R U A R Y	20	The Spell	Worldvision Enterprises / MGM Television / Charles Fries Productions / Stonehenge Productions	Lee Philips (director); Brian Taggert (screenplay); Lee Grant, Susan Myers, Lelia Goldoni, Helen Hunt, Jack Colvin, James Olson, James Greene, Wright King, Barbara Bostock, Doney Oatman, Richard Carlyle, Kathleen Hughes, Robert Gibbons, Arthur Peterson, Marneen Fields	
F E B R U A R Y	25	Slap Shot	Universal Pictures / Pan Arts / Kings Road Entertainment	George Roy Hill (director); Nancy Dowd (screenplay); Paul Newman, Strother Martin, Michael Ontkean, Jennifer Warren, Lindsay Crouse, Jerry Houser, Andrew Duncan, Jeff Carlson, Steve Carlson, David Hanson, Yvon Barrette, Allan Nicholls, Brad Sullivan, Stephen Mendillo, Yvan Ponton, Matthew Cowles, Kathryn Walker, Melinda Dillon, M. Emmet Walsh, Swoosie Kurtz, Paul D'Amato, Ronald L. Docken, Guido Tenesi, Jean Rosario Tėtreault, Christopher Murney, Blake Ball, Ned Dowd, Larry Block, Paul Dooley, Bruce Boudreau, Galen Head, Connie Madigan, Joe Nolan, Dick Roberge, Ross Smith, Steve Stirling, Cliff Thompson, Nancy N. Dowd, Barbara L. Shorts, Dan Belisle Jr., Rod Bloomfield, Susan Kendall Newman, Ray Schultz, Carol Shelton	
F E B R U A R Y	25	Tentacles	American International Pictures	Ovidio G. Assonitis (director); Steven W. Carabatsos (screenplay); John Huston, Shelley Winters, Bo Hopkins, Henry Fonda, Cesare Danova, Delia Boccardo, Claude Akins, Franco Diogene, Marc Fiorini, Alan Boyd, Sherry Buchanan	
M A R C H	3	Mr. Billion	20th Century Fox / Pantheon Pictures	Jonathan Kaplan (director/screenplay); Terence Hill, Valerie Perrine, Jackie Gleason, Slim Pickens, William Redfield, Chill Wills, Dick Miller, R.G. Armstrong	
M A R C H	4	Death Weekend	American International Pictures / Cinépix Film Properties	William Fruet (director/screenplay); Brenda Vaccaro, Don Stroud, Chuck Shamata, Richard Ayres, Kyle Edwards, Don Granberry, Ed McNamara, Michael Kirby, and Richard Donat	
M A R C H	9	The Farmer	Columbia Pictures / Milway Productions	David Berlatsky (director); John Carmody, Janice Eymann, George Fargo, Patrick Regan (screenplay); Lewell Akins, Gary Conway, Michael Dante, Dave Graig, Stratton Leopold, Ray McIver, George Memmoli, Timothy Scott, Sonny Shroyer, Angel Tompkins, Bill Moses, Judge Parker, Don Payne, Louis C. Pessolano, Johnny Popwell, Ken Renard, Wayne Stewart, Roy Tatum, Jack Waltzer, Eric Weston, Laura Whyte	
M A R C H	9	Islands in the Stream	Paramount Pictures	Franklin J. Schaffner (director); Denne Bart Petitclerc (screenplay); George C. Scott, David Hemmings, Gilbert Roland, Susan Tyrrell, Richard Evans, Claire Bloom, Julius Harris, Hart Bochner, Brad Savage, Michael-James Wixted, Hildy Brooks	
M A R C H	11	The Many Adventures of Winnie the Pooh	Walt Disney Productions / Buena Vista Distribution	John Lounsbery, Wolfgang Reitherman (directors); Larry Clemmons, Ralph Wright, Vance Gerry, Xavier Atencio, Ken Anderson, Julius Svendsen, Ted Berman, Eric Cleworth (screenplay); Sterling Holloway, John Fiedler, Junius Matthews, Paul Winchell, Howard Morris, Bruce Reitherman, Jon Walmsley, Timothy Turner, Ralph Wright, Clint Howard, Barbara Luddy, Hal Smith, Sebastian Cabot, Dori Whitaker	
M A R C H	11	Black Sunday	Paramount Pictures	John Frankenheimer (director); Ernest Lehman, Kenneth Ross, Ivan Moffat (screenplay); Robert Shaw, Bruce Dern, Marthe Keller, Fritz Weaver, Bekim Fehmiu, Steven Keats, Michael V. Gazzo, William Daniels, Walter Gotell, Victor Campos, Joe Robbie, Robert Wussler, Pat Summerall, Tom Brookshier, Walter Brooke, Clyde Kusatsu, Tom McFadden, Than Wyenn, James Jeter, Robert Patten	
M A R C H	11	Airport '77	Universal Pictures	Jerry Jameson (director); Michael Scheff, David Spector (screenplay); Jack Lemmon, Lee Grant, Brenda Vaccaro, Joseph Cotten, Olivia de Havilland, Darren McGavin, Christopher Lee, George Kennedy, James Stewart, Robert Foxworth, Robert Hooks, Monte Markham, Kathleen Quinlan, Gil Gerard, James Booth, Monica Lewis, Maidie Norman, Pamela Bellwood, Arlene Golonka, Tom Sullivan, M. Emmet Walsh, Michael Pataki, George Furth, Richard Venture, Peter Fox, Charles Macaulay, Tom Rosqui, Anthony Battaglia, Elizabeth Cheshire, Dar Robinson, Chuck Hayward, Jo de Winter, Chris Lemmon, Tom Morga	
M A R C H	25	Eraserhead	Warner Bros. Pictures / Libra Films	David Lynch (director/screenplay); Jack Nance, Charlotte Stewart, Allen Joseph, Jeanne Bates, Judith Roberts, Jack Fisk, Laurel Near	
M A R C H	25	The American Friend	Paramount Pictures	Wim Wenders (director/screenplay); Dennis Hopper, Bruno Ganz, Lisa Kreuzer, Gérard Blain, Nicholas Ray, Samuel Fuller, Peter Lilienthal, Daniel Schmid, Jean Eustache, Sandy Whitelaw, Lou Castel, David Blue, Andreas Dedecke	
M A R C H	25	The Domino Principle	AVCO Embassy Pictures / ITC Entertainment	Stanley Kramer (director); Adam Kennedy (screenplay); Gene Hackman, Candice Bergen, Mickey Rooney, Richard Widmark, Edward Albert, Eli Wallach, Ken Swofford, Neva Patterson, Jay Novello, Joseph V. Perry, Majel Barrett	

== April–June ==
Opening		Title	Production company	Cast and crew	Ref.
A P R I L	1	Breaker! Breaker!	American International Pictures / Paragon Films Inc. / Worldwide Productions	Don Hulette (director); Terry Chambers (screenplay); Chuck Norris, George Murdock, Jack Nance, Terry O'Connor, Michael Augenstein, Don Gentry, John Di Fusco, Ron Cedillos, Dan Vandegrift, Douglas Stevenson, Paul Kawecki, Larry Feder	
A P R I L	1	Raggedy Ann & Andy: A Musical Adventure	20th Century Fox / The Bobbs-Merrill Company / Richard Williams Productions	Richard Williams (director); Max Wilk (screenplay); Claire Williams, Didi Conn, Mark Baker, Mason Adams, Allen Swift, Sheldon Harnick, George S. Irving, Arnold Stang, Joe Silver, Alan Sues, Marty Brill, Paul Dooley, Joe Raposo, Hetty Galen, Ardyth Kaiser, Margery Gray, Lynne Stuart, Niki Flacks, Fred Stuthman	
A P R I L	1	The Van	Crown International Pictures	Sam Grossman (director); Celia Susan Cotelo, Robert J. Rosenthal (screenplay); Stuart Getz, Deborah White, Danny DeVito, Harry Moses, Marcie Barkin, Bill Adler, Stephen Oliver, Connie Lisa Marie	
A P R I L	2	The Eagle Has Landed	Columbia Pictures / ITC Entertainment	John Sturges (director); Tom Mankiewicz (screenplay); Michael Caine, Donald Sutherland, Robert Duvall, Jenny Agutter, Donald Pleasence, Anthony Quayle, Jean Marsh, Sven-Bertil Taube, Judy Geeson, Siegfried Rauch, John Standing, Treat Williams, Larry Hagman, Michael Byrne, Maurice Roeves, Keith Buckley	
A P R I L	6	Audrey Rose	United Artists / Sterobcar Productions	Robert Wise (director); Frank De Felitta (screenplay); Marsha Mason, Anthony Hopkins, John Beck, Susan Swift, Norman Lloyd, John Hillerman, Robert Walden, Stephen Pearlman, Mary Jackson, Richard Lawson, Ivy Jones, Aly Wassil, Elizabeth Farley	
A P R I L	8	Demon Seed	Warner Bros. Pictures (United States/Canada) / Cinema International Corporation (international) / Herb Jaffe Productions	Donald Cammell (director); Dean Koontz (screenplay); Julie Christie, Fritz Weaver, Gerrit Graham, Berry Kroeger, Lisa Lu, Larry J. Blake, Alfred Dennis, Patricia Wilson, Barbara O. Jones, Felix Silla, Robert Vaughn, John O'Leary, Davis Roberts, E. Hampton Beagle, Michael Glass, Dana Laurita, Monica MacLean, Harold Oblong, Georgie Paul, Michelle Stacy, Tiffany Potter	
A P R I L	8	Rabid	Cinépix Film Properties / New World Pictures / Cinema Entertainment Enterprises / DAL Productions / The Dibar Syndicate	David Cronenberg (director/screenplay); Marilyn Chambers, Frank Moore, Joe Silver, Howard Ryshpan, Patricia Gage, Susan Roman, Terry Schonblum, Allan Moyle, John Boylan, Vlasta Vrana, Peter MacNeill, Louis Negin, J. Roger Periard, Lynne Deragon, Victor Désy, Julie Anna, Gary McKeehan, Terence G. Ross	
A P R I L	15	Jabberwocky	Columbia Pictures (United States/Canada) / Warner Bros. (international) / Python Films / Umbrella Films	Terry Gilliam (director/screenplay); Charles Alverson (screenplay); Michael Palin, Harry H. Corbett, John Le Mesurier, Warren Mitchell, Annette Badland, Max Wall, Deborah Fallender, Jerold Wells, Bernard Bresslaw, Rodney Bewes, John Bird, Neil Innes, Terry Jones, Brian Glover, Graham Crowden, Terry Gilliam, David Prowse	
A P R I L	20	Annie Hall	United Artists	Woody Allen (director/screenplay); Marshall Brickman (screenplay); Woody Allen, Diane Keaton, Tony Roberts, Carol Kane, Paul Simon, Shelley Duvall, Janet Margolin, Colleen Dewhurst, Christopher Walken, Donald Symington, Mordecai Lawner, Joan Newman, Martin Rosenblatt, Hy Anzell, Marshall McLuhan, Christine Jones, John Doumanian, Dick Cavett, Mark Lenard, John Glover, Johnny Haymer, John Dennis Johnston, Laurie Bird, Jim McKrell, Jeff Goldblum, William Callaway, Charles Levin, Loretta Tupper, Shelley Hack, Paula Trueman, Beverly D'Angelo, Tracey Walter, Lucy Lee Flippin, Gary Mule Deer, Sigourney Weaver, Walter Bernstein, Truman Capote, Jack Gwillim, Ann Risley	
A P R I L	20	3 Women	20th Century Fox / Lion's Gate Films	Robert Altman (director/screenplay); Shelley Duvall, Sissy Spacek, Janice Rule, Robert Fortier, Ruth Nelson, John Cromwell, Sierra Pecheur, Craig Richard Nelson, Maysie Hoy, Belita Moreno, Leslie Ann Hudson, Patricia Ann Hudson, Beverly Ross	
A P R I L	27	Between the Lines	Midwest Films / Vestron Video	Joan Micklin Silver (director); Fred Barron, David M. Helpern Jr. (screenplay); John Heard, Lindsay Crouse, Jeff Goldblum, Gwen Welles, Bruno Kirby, Stephen Collins, Joe Morton, Marilu Henner, Richard Cox, Michael J. Pollard, Lane Smith, Raymond J. Barry, Guy Boyd, Charles Levin, Jill Eikenberry, Susan Haskins	
A P R I L	27	The Man Who Loved Women	United Artists / Les Films du Carrosse	François Truffaut (director/screenplay); Michel Fermaud, Suzanne Schiffman (screenplay); Charles Denner, Brigitte Fossey, Nelly Borgeaud, Geneviève Fontanel, Leslie Caron, Nathalie Baye, Valérie Bonnier, Jean Dasté, Roger Leenhardt, François Truffaut	
M A Y	6	Andy Warhol's Bad	New World Pictures / Factory Films	Jed Johnson (director); Pat Hackett, George Abagnalo (screenplay); Carroll Baker, Perry King, Susan Tyrrell, Stefania Casini, Cyrinda Foxe, Susan Blond, Tere Tereba, Lawrence Tierney, Tamara Horrocks, Charles McGregor, Matthew Anton, Cathy Roskam, Mary Boylan, Gordon Oas-Heim, Michael Forella, Kitty Bruce, Renee Paris, John Starke, Ruth Jaroslow	
M A Y	6	The Picture Show Man	Village Roadshow Pictures / Umbrella Entertainment / Limelight Productions	John Power (director); Joan Long (screenplay); Rod Taylor, John Meillon, John Ewart, Harold Hopkins, Patrick Cargill, Yelena Zigon, Garry McDonald, Sally Conabere, Judy Morris, Gerry Duggan	
M A Y	6	The White Buffalo	Warner Bros. Pictures	J. Lee Thompson (director); Richard Sale (screenplay); Charles Bronson, Jack Warden, Will Sampson, Kim Novak, Clint Walker, Stuart Whitman, Slim Pickens, John Carradine, Cara Williams, Shay Duffin, Douglas Fowley, Ed Lauter, Martin Kove, Ed Bakey, Richard Gilliland, Linda Redfearn, Ron Thompson, Eve Brent, Clifford A. Pellow, Scott Walker, Cliff Carnell	
M A Y	13	The Car	Universal Pictures	Elliot Silverstein (director); Michael Butler, Dennis Shryack, Lane Slate (screenplay); James Brolin, Kathleen Lloyd, John Marley, Elizabeth Thompson, Ronny Cox, R.G. Armstrong, John Rubinstein, Roy Jenson, Kim Richards, Kyle Richards, Kate Murtagh, Robert Phillips, Doris Dowling, Eddie Little Sky, Lee McLaughlin, Read Morgan, Geraldine Keams, Melody Thomas Scott, Bryan O'Byrne, Don Keefer, Steve Gravers, Henry O'Brien, Margaret Willey, Ernie Orsatti, Joshua Davis, Hank Hamilton, John Moio, Bob Woodlock, James Rawley, Louis Welch, Tony Brande	
M A Y	17	A Special Day	Surf Film / Gold Film / Compagnia Cinematografica / Champion / Canafox Films	Ettore Scola (director/screenplay); Maurizio Costanzo, Ruggero Maccari (screenplay); Sophia Loren, Marcello Mastroianni, John Vernon, Françoise Berd, Vittorio Guerrieri, Alessandra Mussolini, Patrizia Basso, Tiziano De Persio, Maurizio Di Paolantonio, Antonio Garibaldi, Nicole Magny	
M A Y	18	Handle with Care	Paramount Pictures	Jonathan Demme (director); Paul Brickman (screenplay); Paul Le Mat, Candy Clark, Bruce McGill, Roberts Blossom, Richard Bright, Charles Napier, Ann Wedgeworth, Marcia Rodd, Ed Begley Jr., Harry Northup, Will Seltzer, Alix Elias, Michael Rothman, Michael Mahler, Leila Smith	
M A Y	18	Joseph Andrews	United Artists / Paramount Pictures / Woodfall Film Productions	Tony Richardson (director); Chris Bryant (screenplay); Ann-Margret, Peter Firth, Michael Hordern, Beryl Reid, Jim Dale, Beryl Reid, Natalie Ogle, John Gielgud, Hugh Griffith, Peter Bull, Karen Dotrice, Peggy Ashcroft, James Villiers, Timothy West, Wendy Craig, Ronald Pickup, Penelope Wilton, Kenneth Cranham, Norman Rossington, Patsy Rowlands	
M A Y	20	Cross of Iron	EMI Films / Constantin Film / AVCO Embassy Pictures / Anglo-EMI Productions / Rapid Film / Terra-Filmkunst / ITC Entertainment	Sam Peckinpah (director/screenplay); James Coburn, Maximilian Schell, James Mason, David Warner, Klaus Löwitsch, Vadim Glowna, Roger Fritz, Dieter Schidor, Burkhard Driest, Fred Stillkrauth, Michael Nowka, Véronique Vendell, Arthur Brauss, Senta Berger, Igor Galo, Slavko Štimac, Demeter Bitenc, Vladan Živković, Bata Kameni, Hermina Pipinić	
M A Y	20	The Greatest	Columbia Pictures / British Lion Films / EMI Films	Tom Gries, Monte Hellman (directors); Muhammad Ali (screenplay); Muhammad Ali, Ernest Borgnine, James Earl Jones, Robert Duvall, John Marley, Lloyd Haynes, David Huddleston, Ben Johnson, Dina Merrill, Roger E. Mosley, Paul Winfield, Annazette Chase, Mira Waters, Drew Bundini Brown, Malachi Throne, Richard Venture, Arthur Adams, Stack Pierce, Paul Mantee, Skip Homeier, David Clennon, Nai Bonet, Chip McAllister, Rahaman Ali, Howard Bingham, Don Dunphy, Lloyd Wells, Harold Conrad, Pat Patterson, Gene Kilroy	
M A Y	25	Star Wars	20th Century Fox / Lucasfilm	George Lucas (director/screenplay); Mark Hamill, Harrison Ford, Carrie Fisher, Peter Cushing, Alec Guinness, Anthony Daniels, Kenny Baker, Peter Mayhew, James Earl Jones, David Prowse, Phil Brown, Shelagh Fraser, Jack Purvis, Eddie Byrne, Denis Lawson, Garrick Hagon, Don Henderson, Leslie Schofield, Richard LeParmentier, Alex McCrindle, Alfie Curtis, Peter Geddis, Michael Leader, Robert Clarke, Patrick Jordan, Drewe Henley, Jack Klaff, William Hootkins, Angus MacInnes, Jeremy Sinden, Scott Beach, Steve Gawley, Joe Johnston, Grant McCune, Peter Sumner, Malcolm Tierney, Phil Tippett	
M A Y	27	Cinderella	Group 1	Michael Pataki (director); Frank Ray Perilli (screenplay); Cheryl Smith, Yana Nirvana, Marilyn Corwin, Jennifer Stace, Sy Richardson, Brett Smiley, Kirk Scott, Boris Moris, Pamela Stonebrook, Frank Ray Perilli	
M A Y	27	Desperate Living	New Line Cinema / Dreamland	John Waters (director/screenplay); Liz Renay, Mink Stole, Edith Massey, Susan Lowe, Mary Vivian Pearce, Jean Hill, Cookie Mueller, Channing Wilroy, Ed Peranio, Paul Swift, George Figgs, Sharon Niesp, George Stover, Turkey Joe, Al Strapelli, Brook Blake, Karen Gerwig, Marina Melin	
M A Y	27	Smokey and the Bandit	Universal Pictures / Rastar	Hal Needham (director); James Lee Barrett, Charles Shyer, Alan Mandel (screenplay); Burt Reynolds, Sally Field, Jerry Reed, Jackie Gleason, Mike Henry, Pat McCormick, Paul Williams, Macon McCalman, Michael McManus, Ben Jones, Joe Klecko, Hank Worden, Sonny Shroyer, Susan McIver, George Reynolds, Laura Lizer Sommers, Michael Mann, Lamar Jackson, Ronnie Gay, Quinnon Sheffield, Alfie Wise, Pat Hustis, Ingeborg Kjeldsen, Gene Witham, Susan Sindelar	
J U N E	1	The Grateful Dead Movie	Monarch Films	Jerry Garcia, Leon Gast (directors); Jerry Garcia, Bob Weir, Phil Lesh, Bill Kreutzmann, Donna Godchaux, Keith Godchaux, Mickey Hart	
J U N E	3	Fraternity Row	Paramount Pictures	Thomas J. Tobin (director); Charles Gary Allison (screenplay); Peter Fox, Gregory Harrison, Scott Newman, Nancy Morgan, Wendy Phillips, Robert Emhardt, Cliff Robertson, Dean Smith	
J U N E	3	Crossed Swords	Warner Bros. Pictures / International Film Production / Prince and the Pauper Film Export A.G.	Richard Fleischer (director); George MacDonald Fraser (screenplay); Mark Lester, Ernest Borgnine, Oliver Reed, Raquel Welch, Rex Harrison, Charlton Heston, George C. Scott, David Hemmings, Harry Andrews, Julian Orchard, Murray Melvin, Lalla Ward, Felicity Dean, Sybil Danning, Graham Stark, Preston Lockwood, Arthur Hewlett, Tommy Wright, Harry Fowler, Richard Hurndall, Don Henderson, Dudley Sutton, Ruth Madoc	
J U N E	8	The Other Side of Midnight	20th Century Fox	Charles Jarrott (director); Herman Raucher (screenplay); Marie-France Pisier, John Beck, Susan Sarandon, Raf Vallone, Clu Gulager, Christian Marquand, Michael Lerner, Sorrell Booke, Antony Ponzini, Louis Zorich, Charles Cioffi, Howard Hesseman, Titos Vandis, Dimitra Arliss, Josette Banzet	
J U N E	10	For the Love of Benji	Mulberry Square Releasing	Joe Camp (director/screenplay); Ben Vaughn (screenplay); Benjean, Patsy Garrett, Cynthia Smith, Allen Fiuzat, Ed Nelson, Peter Bowles, Art Vasil, Bridget Armstrong, Tiffany	
J U N E	10	Grand Theft Auto	New World Pictures	Ron Howard (director/screenplay); Rance Howard (screenplay); Ron Howard, Nancy Morgan, Marion Ross, Peter Isacksen, Don Steele, Clint Howard, Rance Howard, Paul Linke, Elizabeth Rogers, Barry Cahill, Jack Perkins, Paul Bartel, Garry Marshall, Leo Rossi, Allan Arkush, Bill Conklin, Robby Weaver, James Ritz	
J U N E	10	Rollercoaster	Universal Pictures	James Goldstone (director); Sanford Sheldon, Richard Levinson, William Link, Tommy Cook (screenplay); George Segal, Richard Widmark, Timothy Bottoms, Henry Fonda, Harry Guardino, Susan Strasberg, Helen Hunt, Dorothy Tristan, Stephen Pearlman, Wayne Tippit, Michael Bell, Craig Wasson, William Prince, Quinn Redeker, Harry Basch, Arthur Peterson, Robert Quarry, Jean Rasey, Bruce French, Stephen Mendillo, Monica Lewis, Dick Wesson, Roger Steffens, Tara Buckman, Steve Guttenberg, Ron Mael, Russell Mael, Simon Prescott, Roger Til	
J U N E	15	A Bridge Too Far	United Artists / Joseph E. Levine Productions	Richard Attenborough (director); William Goldman (screenplay); Dirk Bogarde, James Caan, Michael Caine, Sean Connery, Edward Fox, Elliott Gould, Anthony Hopkins, Gene Hackman, Hardy Krüger, Laurence Olivier, Ryan O'Neal, Robert Redford, Maximilian Schell, Liv Ullmann, Michael Byrne, Denholm Elliott, Peter Faber, Christopher Good, Frank Grimes, Jeremy Kemp, Nicholas Campbell, Paul Copley, Donald Douglas, Keith Drinkel, Richard Kane, Paul Maxwell, Stephen Moore, Donald Pickering, Gerald Sim, John Stride, Alun Armstrong, David Auker, Michael Bangerter, Philip Raymond, Michael Graham Cox, Garrick Hagon, John Ratzenberger, Arthur Hill, Ben Cross, Mark Sheridan, George Innes, Wolfgang Preiss, Walter Kohut, Hartmut Becker, Hans von Borsody, Lex van Delden, Fred Williams, Erik Chitty, Richard Attenborough	
J U N E	17	Exorcist II: The Heretic	Warner Bros. Pictures	John Boorman (director); William Goodhart (screenplay); Linda Blair, Richard Burton, Louise Fletcher, Max von Sydow, Kitty Winn, Paul Henreid, James Earl Jones, Ned Beatty, Richard Paul, Ken Renard, Dana Plato, Belinha Beatty, Rose Portillo, Barbara Mason, Joey Green, Tiffany Kinney, Charles Parks, Lorry Goldman, Robert Lussier, George Skaff, Karen Knapp	
J U N E	17	The Getting of Wisdom	Roadshow / Southern Cross Films	Bruce Beresford (director); Eleanor Witcombe (screenplay); Susannah Fowle, Hilary Ryan, Terence Donovan, Patricia Kennedy, Sheila Helpmann, Candy Raymond, Barry Humphries, John Waters, Julia Blake, Diana Greentree, Monica Maughan, Dorothy Bradley, Kay Eklund, Maggie Kirkpatrick, Phillip Adams, Kerry Armstrong, Sigrid Thornton, Celia De Burgh, Kim Deacon, Alix Longman, Jo-Anne Moore, Amanda Ring, Janet Shaw, Karen Sutton	
J U N E	21	New York, New York	United Artists / Chartoff-Winkler Productions	Martin Scorsese (director); Mardik Martin, Earl Mac Rauch (screenplay); Liza Minnelli, Robert De Niro, Lionel Stander, Barry Primus, Mary Kay Place, Georgie Auld, George Memmoli, Dick Miller, Clarence Clemons, Dimitri Logothetis, Frank Sivero, Diahnne Abbott, Margo Winkler, Don Calfa, Selma Archerd, Casey Kasem, Sidney Guilaroff, Louis Guss, Shera Danese, Harry Northup, DeForest Covan, Mardik Martin, Joey Forman, Jack Haley, George Holmes, Larry Kert, Julia Phillips, Maria Pogee, Arthur Tovey, Adam David Winkler, Steven Prince, Bill Baldwin, Nicky Blair	
J U N E	22	The Rescuers	Walt Disney Productions / Buena Vista Distribution	Wolfgang Reitherman, John Lounsbery, Art Stevens (directors); Larry Clemmons, Vance Gerry, Ken Anderson, Frank Thomas, Burny Mattinson, Fred Lucky, Dick Sebast, David Michener, Ted Berman (screenplay); Bob Newhart, Eva Gabor, Michelle Stacy, Geraldine Page, Joe Flynn, Jim Jordan, John McIntire, Jeanette Nolan, Pat Buttram, Bernard Fox, James McDonald, George Lindsey, Larry Clemmons, Dub Taylor, John Fiedler, Shelby Flint, Bill McMillian	
J U N E	24	Herbie Goes to Monte Carlo	Walt Disney Productions / Buena Vista Distribution	Vincent McEveety (director); Arthur Alsberg, Don Nelson (screenplay); Dean Jones, Don Knotts, Julie Sommars, Jacques Marin, Roy Kinnear, Bernard Fox, Eric Braeden, Xavier Saint-Macary, Alan Caillou, Laurie Main, Johnny Haymer, Stanley Brock, Gérard Jugnot, Richard Warlock, Carey Loftin, Jesse Wayne, Josiane Balasko, Katia Tchenko, François Lalande, Mike Kulcsar	
J U N E	24	Sorcerer	Universal Pictures (U.S.A & Canada) / Paramount Pictures (International) / Film Properties International N.V.	William Friedkin (director); Walon Green (screenplay); Roy Scheider, Bruno Cremer, Francisco Rabal, Amidou, Ramon Bieri, Karl John, Peter Capell, Anne-Marie Deschodt, Friedrich von Ledebur, Chico Martinez, Joe Spinell, Rosario Almontes, Richard Holley, Jean-Luc Bideau, Jacques François, Gerard Murphy, Randy Jurgensen, Cosmo Allegretti	

== July–September ==
Opening		Title	Production company	Cast and crew	Ref.
J U L Y	1	Greased Lightning	Warner Bros. Pictures	Michael Schultz (director); Melvin Van Peebles (screenplay); Richard Pryor, Beau Bridges, Pam Grier, Cleavon Little, Vincent Gardenia, Richie Havens, Julian Bond, Earl Hindman, Lucy Saroyan, Noble Willingham, Bill Cobbs, Georgia Allen, Bruce Atkins, Steve Fifield	
J U L Y	8	The Bad News Bears in Breaking Training	Paramount Pictures	Michael Pressman (director); Paul Bickman (screenplay); William Devane, Jackie Earle Haley, Clifton James, Chris Barnes, Erin Blunt, Jimmy Baio, Alfred W. Lutter, Brett Marx, David Pollock, Jeffrey Louis Starr, David Stambaugh, Jaime Escobedo, George Gonzales, Quinn Smith, Lane Smith, Dolph Sweet, Pat Corley, Douglas Anderson, Jerry Lawson, Fred Stuthman	
J U L Y	12	Stroszek	Werner Herzog Filmproduktion / ZDF	Werner Herzog (director/screenplay); Bruno S., Eva Mattes, Clemens Scheitz	
J U L Y	13	The Spy Who Loved Me	United Artists / Eon Productions	Lewis Gilbert (director); Christopher Wood, Richard Maibaum (screenplay); Roger Moore, Barbara Bach, Curd Jürgens, Richard Kiel, Caroline Munro, Geoffrey Keen, Edward de Souza, George Baker, Lois Maxwell, Walter Gotell, Vernon Dobtcheff, Desmond Llewelyn, Michael Billington, Bernard Lee, Shane Rimmer, Bryan Marshall, Nadim Sawalha, Robert Brown, Sue Vanner, Sydney Tafler, Eva Rueber-Staier, Milton Reid, Olga Bisera, Valerie Leon, Cyril Shaps, Milo Sperber, Albert Moses, Marilyn Galsworthy, Nicholas Campbell, Bob Sherman, Murray Salem, John Truscott, Vincent Marzello, Garrick Hagon, Ray Jewers, George Mallaby, Kevin McNally, Jeremy Bulloch, Sean Bury, David Auker, Keith Buckley, John Salthouse	
J U L Y	13	The Island of Dr. Moreau	American International Pictures	Don Taylor (director); John Herman Shaner (screenplay); Burt Lancaster, Michael York, Nigel Davenport, Barbara Carrera, Richard Basehart, Nick Cravat, Fumio Demura, The Great John L., Bob Ozman, Gary Baxley, John Gillespie, David Cass	
J U L Y	14	I Never Promised You a Rose Garden	New World Pictures	Anthony Page (director); Roger Corman (screenplay); Kathleen Quinlan, Bibi Andersson, Ben Piazza, Lorraine Gary, Martine Bartlett, Darlene Craviotto, Reni Santoni, Susan Tyrrell	
J U L Y	15	The Happy Hooker Goes to Washington	Cannon Films	William A. Levey (director); Bob Kaufman (screenplay); Joey Heatherton, George Hamilton, Ray Walston, Jack Carter, Louisa Moritz, Rip Taylor, Phil Foster, David White, Joe E. Ross, Billy Barty, Harold Sakata, Edy Williams, Larry Storch, Will Hutchins, Cisse Cameron	
J U L Y	15	MacArthur	Universal Pictures	Hal Barwood (director); Matthew Robbins (screenplay); Gregory Peck, Ed Flanders, Dan O'Herlihy, Ivan Bonar, Ward Costello, Nicolas Coster, Marj Dusay, Art Fleming, Russell Johnson, Sandy Kenyon, Robert Mandan, Allan Miller, Dick O'Neill, G.D. Spradlin, Addison Powell, Tom Rosqui, Kenneth Tobey, Charles Cyphers, Garry Walberg, Barry Coe, Yuki Shimoda, Harvey Vernon, William Wellman Jr., James Shigeta, Robert V. Barron, John Fujioka, Arthur Godfrey, Evan C. Kim, Branscombe Richmond, Cosmo Sardo, Lane Allan, Everett Cooper, Warde Donovan, Philip Kenneally, John McKee, Walter O. Miles, Gerald S. Peters, Eugene Peterson, Alex Rodine, Fred Stuthman	
J U L Y	15	The Last Remake of Beau Geste	Universal Pictures	Marty Feldman (director/screenplay); Sam Bobrick (screenplay); Marty Feldman, Michael York, Ann-Margret, Peter Ustinov, James Earl Jones, Trevor Howard, Henry Gibson, Roy Kinnear, Spike Milligan, Terry-Thomas, Sinéad Cusack, Burt Kwouk, Avery Schreiber, Irene Handl, Hugh Griffith, Stephen Lewis, Ed McMahon, Michael McConkey	
J U L Y	17	The Deep	Columbia Pictures / Casablanca FilmWorks / EMI Films	Peter Yates (director); Peter Benchley (screenplay); Robert Shaw, Jacqueline Bisset, Nick Nolte, Louis Gossett Jr., Eli Wallach, Dick Anthony Williams, Earl Maynard, Bob Minor, Teddy Tucker, Robert Tessier, Lee McClain, Colin Shaw	
J U L Y	22	One on One	Warner Bros.	Lamont Johnson (director); Robby Benson, Jerry Segal (screenplay); Robby Benson, Annette O'Toole, G. D. Spradlin, Lamont Johnson, Melanie Griffith, Hector Morales, Gail Strickland, Cory Faucher, Charles Fleischer	
J U L Y	22	Orca	Paramount Pictures / Famous Films	Michael Anderson (director); Sergio Donati, Robert Towne (screenplay); Richard Harris, Charlotte Rampling, Will Sampson, Bo Derek, Keenan Wynn, Robert Carradine, Scott Walker, Peter Hooten, Don "Red" Barry	
J U L Y	22	The Hills Have Eyes	New World Pictures / Vanguard / Blood Relations Company	Wes Craven (director/screenplay); Susan Lanier, Robert Houston, Martin Speer, Dee Wallace, Russ Grieve, John Steadman, Michael Berryman, Virginia Vincent, Janus Blythe, James Whitworth, Cordy Clark, Lance Gordon, Peter Locke, Brenda Marinoff	
J U L Y	29	Empire of the Ants	American International Pictures / Cinema 77	Bert I. Gordon (director/screenplay); Jack Turley (screenplay); Joan Collins, Robert Lansing, John David Carson, Albert Salmi, Jacqueline Scott, Pamela Susan Shoop, Robert Pine, Tom Fadden, Irene Tedrow, Edward Power, Brooke Palance, Harry Holcombe	
J U L Y	29	House	Toho	Nobuhiko Obayashi (director); Chiho Katsura (screenplay); Kimiko Ikegami, Miki Jinbo, Ai Matubara, Kumiko Oba, Mieko Sato, Eriko Tanaka, Masayo Miyako, Yōko Minamida, Kiyohiko Ozaki, Saho Sasazawa, Haruko Wanibuchi	
J U L Y	29	Walking Tall: Final Chapter	American International Pictures	Jack Starrett (director); Howard B. Kreitsek, Samuel A. Peeples (screenplay); Bo Svenson, Lurene Tuttle, Forrest Tucker, Leif Garrett, Dawn Lyn, Simpson Hemphill, Sandy McPeak, Logan Ramsey, Morgan Woodward, Clay Tanner, Maggie Blye, Bruce Glover, Red West, David Adams, Michael Allen Honaker, Vance Davis, Libby Boone	
A U G U S T	3	Brothers	Warner Bros. / Edward Lewis Productions / Soho Productions	Arthur Barron (director); Bernie Casey, Vonetta McGee, Ron O'Neal, John Lehne, Stu Gilliam, Renny Roker, Owen Pace, Dwan Smith, Martin St. Judge	
A U G U S T	5	March or Die	Columbia Pictures / ITC Entertainment	Dick Richards (director); David Zelag Goodman (screenplay); Gene Hackman, Terence Hill, Max von Sydow, Ian Holm, Catherine Deneuve, Jack O'Halloran, Rufus, Marcel Bozzuffi, Vernon Dobtcheff, Marne Maitland, Gigi Bonos, Wolf Kahler, Jean Champion, Walter Gotell, Arnold Diamond, Liliane Rovère, Guy Deghy, Jean Rougerie, Eve Brenner, Margaret Modlin, Luis Barboo, Clément Harari, André Penvern, Paul Sherman, Mathias Hell, Paul Antrim, Catherine Willmer, Maurice Arden, Albert Woods, Elisabeth Mortensen, François Valorbe, Villena, Ernest Misko, Guy Mairesse, Guy Marly	
A U G U S T	10	The Kentucky Fried Movie	United Film Distribution Company / Kentucky Fried Theater	John Landis (director); Jim Abrahams, David Zucker, Jerry Zucker (screenplay); Bill Bixby, George Lazenby, Evan C. Kim, Bong Soo Han, Donald Sutherland, Henry Gibson, Barry Dennen, Agneta Eckemyr, Tony Dow, John Cassisi, Janice Kent, Eloise Hardt, Rick Baker, John Landis, David Zucker, Stephen Bishop, Gwen Van Dam, Uschi Digard, Michael Kearns, Felix Silla, Jeff Maxwell, Michael Alaimo, Tina Louise, Jerry Zucker, Sheila Rogers, John Anthony Bailey, Manny Perry, Nathan Jung, George Cheung, Phillip Rhee, Simon Rhee, Cho Hee-il, Branscombe Richmond, Jun Chong, Rollin Moriyama, Tad Horino, Lance LeGault, Victoria Carroll, Dick Yarmy, Michael McManus, Stephen Stucker, Forrest J. Ackerman, Jim Abrahams, Marilyn Joi, Nancy Steen, Tara Strohmeier, Shadoe Stevens, Bob Holt, Bob Weiss	
A U G U S T	10	The Little Girl Who Lives Down the Lane	Astral Films / Cinema International Corporation / American International Pictures / Claremont Productions / Zev Braun Productions / I.C.L. Industries / La Societe Filmel / Ypsilon Films	Nicolas Gessner (director); Laird Koenig (screenplay); Jodie Foster, Martin Sheen, Alexis Smith, Mort Shuman, Scott Jacoby, Connie Foster	
A U G U S T	12	Sinbad and the Eye of the Tiger	Columbia Pictures / Andor Films	Sam Wanamaker (director); Ray Harryhausen, Beverley Cross (screenplay); Patrick Wayne, Taryn Power, Margaret Whiting, Jane Seymour, Patrick Troughton	
A U G U S T	14	Outlaw Blues	Warner Bros.	Richard T. Heffron (director); Bill L. Norton (screenplay); Peter Fonda, Susan Saint James, John Crawford, James T. Callahan, Michael Lerner, Steve Fromholz	
A U G U S T	14	Suspiria	20th Century Fox / Produzioni Atlas Consorziate (Italy) / Seda Spettacoli	Dario Argento (director/screenplay); Daria Nicolodi (screenplay); Jessica Harper, Stefania Casini, Flavio Bucci, Miguel Bosé, Barbara Magnolfi	
A U G U S T	17	That Obscure Object of Desire	Greenwich Film Productions / Les Films Galaxie / InCine / GEF-CCFC	Luis Buñuel (director/screenplay); Jean-Claude Carrière (screenplay); Fernando Rey, Carole Bouquet, Ángela Molina, Julien Bertheau, André Weber, Milena Vukotic	
A U G U S T	18	Journey Among Women	Greater Union / Ko-An Film Productions	Tom Cowan (director/screenplay); John Weiley, Dorothy Hewett (screenplay); Jeune Pritchard, Nell Campbell, Diana Fuller, Lisa Peers, Jude Kuring, Robyn Moase, Michelle Johnson, Rose Lilley, Lillian Crombie, Therese Jack, Kay Self, Helenka Link, Ralph Cotterill, Martin Phelan, Tim Elliot	
A U G U S T	24	Race for Your Life, Charlie Brown	Paramount Pictures / Bill Melendez Productions / Lee Mendelson Film Productions / United Feature Syndicate	Bill Melendez (director); Phil Roman (co-director); Charles M. Schulz (screenplay); Duncan Watson, Stuart Brotman, Gail Davis, Liam Martin, Melanie Kohn, Jimmy Ahrens, Kirk Jue, Jordan Warren, Tom Muller, Greg Felton, Joseph Biter, Bill Melendez	
A U G U S T	24	Thunder and Lightning	20th Century Fox	Corey Allen (director); William Hjortsberg (screenplay); David Carradine, Kate Jackson, Sterling Holloway, Patrick Cranshaw, Charles Napier, George Murdock, Ron Feinberg, Roger C. Carmel, Eddie Barth, Charles Willeford, Emilio Rivera, Royce D. Applegate, Allan Arkush, Richard Holden, Hope Pomerance, Malcolm Jones, Christopher Reynolds, Claude Earl Jones	
A U G U S T	26	Joyride	American International Pictures	Joseph Ruben (director/screenplay); Peter Rainer (screenplay); Desi Arnaz Jr., Robert Carradine, Melanie Griffith, Anne Lockhart, Tom Ligon, Cliff Lenz, Robert Loper, Diana Grayf	
A U G U S T	31	You Light Up My Life	Columbia Pictures	Joseph Brooks (director/screenplay); Didi Conn, Joe Silver, Michael Zaslow, Melanie Mayron, Jerry Keller, Joseph Brooks, Ken Olfson, Stephen Nathan, Lisa Reeves, John Gowans, Simmy Bow, Bernice Nicholson, Ed Morgan, Amy Letterman, Marty Zagon, Martin Gish	
S E P T E M B E R	11	The Haunting of Julia	Astral Films / Cinema International Corporation / Canadian Film Development Corporation	Richard Loncraine (director); Dave Humphries (screenplay); Mia Farrow, Keir Dullea, Tom Conti, Jill Bennett, Robin Gammell	
S E P T E M B E R	21	Shock Waves	Joseph Brenner Associates / Lawrence Friedricks Enterprises / Zopix Company	Ken Wiederhorn (director/screenplay); John Harrison (screenplay); Peter Cushing, John Carradine, Brooke Adams, Fred Buch, Jack Davidson, Luke Halpin, D. J. Sidney, Don Stout	
S E P T E M B E R	22	Soldier of Orange	Tuschinski Film Distribution / The Rank Organisation / The International Picture Show Company / Excelsior Films / Film Holland / Rob Houwer Productions	Paul Verhoeven (director/screenplay); Erik Hazelhoff Roelfzema, Kees Holierhoek, Gerard Soeteman (screenplay); Rutger Hauer, Jeroen Krabbé, Derek de Lint, Edward Fox	
S E P T E M B E R	28	Another Man, Another Chance	United Artists / Chartoff-Winkler Productions	Claude Lelouch (director/screenplay); James Caan, Geneviève Bujold, Francis Huster, Susan Tyrrell, Jennifer Warren, Ross Harris, Jacques Villeret, Diana Douglas, Michael Berryman, Dick Farnsworth, Robert Tessier, Walter Barnes, Bernard Behrens, Oliver Clark, Burton Gilliam, Rance Howard, Alma Beltran, Duke Fishman, Jack Ging, Christopher Lloyd, John Megna, Vincent Schiavelli, Milton Selzer, Don Starr, Linda Lee Lyons, Fred Stuthman, William S. Bartman, Dominic Barto, George Flaherty, Jean-Francois Remi, Tony Crupi, Scott Walker	
S E P T E M B E R	28	Short Eyes	Film League	Robert M. Young (director); Miguel Piñero (screenplay); Bruce Davison, Jose Perez, Joseph Carberry, Nathan George, Don Blakely, Tito Goya, Shawn Elliott, Bob Maroff, Miguel Piñero, Luis Guzmán, Curtis Mayfield, Freddy Fender	
S E P T E M B E R	29	Bobby Deerfield	Columbia Pictures / Warner Bros. / First Artists	Sydney Pollack (director); Alvin Sargent (screenplay); Al Pacino, Marthe Keller, Anny Duperey, Walter McGinn, Romolo Valli, Stephan Meldegg, Jaime Sánchez, Norm Nielsen, Mickey Knox, Guido Alberti, Gérard Hernandez, Antonino Faà di Bruno, André Valardy, Féodor Atkine, Al Silvani, Franco Ressel, Maurice Baquet, Bernie Ecclestone, Dorothy James, Monique Lejeune, Steve Gadler, Van Doude, Aurora Maris, Maurice Vallier, Patrick Floersheim, Bernie Pollack, Isabelle de Blonay, Dominique Briand	
S E P T E M B E R	30	A Little Night Music	New World Pictures	Harold Prince (director); Hugh Wheeler (screenplay); Elizabeth Taylor, Diana Rigg, Len Cariou, Lesley-Anne Down, Hermione Gingold, Laurence Guittard, Christopher Guard, Lesley Dunlop, Heinz Marecek, Chloe Franks, Jonathan Tunick	

== October–December ==
Opening		Title	Production company	Cast and crew	Ref.
O C T O B E R	1	The Yellow Handkerchief	Shochiku	Yoji Yamada (director/screenplay); Yoshitaka Asama (screenplay); Ken Takakura, Chieko Baisho, Tetsuya Takeda, Kaori Momoi, Hachirō Tako, Hisao Dazai, Mari Okamoto, and Kiyoshi Atsumi	
O C T O B E R	2	Julia	20th Century Fox	Fred Zinnemann (director); Alvin Sargent (screenplay); Jane Fonda, Vanessa Redgrave, Jason Robards, Hal Holbrook, Rosemary Murphy, Maximilian Schell, Meryl Streep, John Glover, Lisa Pelikan, Maurice Denham, Gérard Buhr, Cathleen Nesbitt, Lambert Wilson, Dora Doll, Elisabeth Mortensen, Susan Jones	
O C T O B E R	2	Roseland	Cinema Shares International Distribution	James Ivory (director); Ruth Prawer Jhabvala (screenplay); Teresa Wright, Lou Jacobi, Geraldine Chaplin, Helen Gallagher, Joan Copeland, Christopher Walken, Conrad Janis, Lilia Skala, Don De Natale, Louise Kirkland, Hetty Galen, Carol Culver, Denny Shearer, Jayne Heller, Annette Rivera, Floyd Chisolm, Jeanmarie Evans, David Thomas, Edward Kogan, Madeline Lee, Stan Rubin, Dortha Duckworth	
O C T O B E R	7	Oh, God!	Warner Bros. Pictures	Carl Reiner (director); Larry Gelbart (screenplay); George Burns, John Denver, Teri Garr, Donald Pleasence, Ralph Bellamy, William Daniels, Barnard Hughes, Paul Sorvino, Barry Sullivan, Dinah Shore, Carl Reiner, Jeff Corey, George Furth, David Ogden Stiers, Titos Vandis, Moosie Drier, Jerry Dunphy, Mario Machado, Connie Sawyer, Wonderful Smith, Murphy Dunne, Zane Buzby, Bob McClurg, Rachel Longaker, Jane Lambert	
O C T O B E R	7	A Piece of the Action	Universal Pictures / First Artists	Sidney Poitier (director); Charles Blackwell (screenplay); Sidney Poitier, Bill Cosby, James Earl Jones, Denise Nicholas, Hope Clarke, Tracy Reed, Titos Vandis, Frances Foster, Jason Evers, Marc Lawrence, Ja'net Dubois, Sheryl Lee Ralph, Ernest Lee Thomas, Eric Laneuville, Wonderful Smith, Pat Renella, Estelle Evans, Frances E. Williams, Bill Walker, James Wheaton, Lawrence Guy	
O C T O B E R	7	Rolling Thunder	American International Pictures / Lawrence Gordon Productions / TBC Film	John Flynn (director); Paul Schrader, Heywood Gould (screenplay); William Devane, Tommy Lee Jones, Linda Haynes, James Best, Dabney Coleman, Luke Askew, James Victor, Cassie Yates, Paul A. Partain, James N. Harrell, Carol Baass Sowa, Lawrason Driscoll, Lisa Blake Richards, Randy Hermann, Charles Escamilla, Pete Ortega, Jordan Gerler, Jacque Burandt	
O C T O B E R	14	The Chicken Chronicles	AVCO Embassy Pictures	Frank Simon (director); Paul Diamond (screenplay); Phil Silvers, Ed Lauter, Steve Guttenberg, Lisa Reeves, Gino Baffa, Meridith Baer, Branscombe Richmond, Jon Gries, Raven De La Croix	
O C T O B E R	14	Starship Invasions	Warner Bros. Pictures / Hal Roach Studios	Ed Hunt (director/screenplay); Robert Vaughn, Christopher Lee, Daniel Pilon, Helen Shaver, Sean McCann, Tiiu Leek, Henry Ramer, Victoria Johnson, Doreen Lipson, Kate Parr, Sherri Ross, Linda Rennhofer, Richard Fitzpatrick, Ted Turner, Bob Warner, Kurt Schiegl	
O C T O B E R	16	Alambrista!	First Run Features / Filmhaus	Robert M. Young (director/screenplay); Domingo Ambriz, Trinidad Silva, Linda Gillen, Ned Beatty, and Jerry Hardin	
O C T O B E R	19	Equus	United Artists / Winkast Film Productions	Sidney Lumet (director); Peter Shaffer (screenplay); Richard Burton, Peter Firth, Jenny Agutter, Joan Plowright, Colin Blakely, Harry Andrews, Eileen Atkins, Kate Reid, John Wyman, Frazier Mohawk, Brook Williams, Elva Mai Hoover, Ken James, David Gardner, James Hurdle, Sheldon Rybowski	
O C T O B E R	19	Looking for Mr. Goodbar	Paramount Pictures	Richard Brooks (director/screenplay); Diane Keaton, Tuesday Weld, William Atherton, Richard Kiley, Richard Gere, Alan Feinstein, Tom Berenger, Priscilla Pointer, Laurie Prange, Joel Fabiani, Julius Harris, Richard Bright, Carole Mallory, Robert Burke, Robert Fields, LeVar Burton, Lou Fant, Eddie Garrett, Alexander Courtney, Brian Dennehy, Richard Venture, Richard O'Brien, Anthony Hawkins, Caren Kaye, Elizabeth Cheshire, Rutanya Alda	
O C T O B E R	21	Damnation Alley	20th Century Fox	Jack Smight (director); Alan Sharp, Lukas Heller (screenplay); Jan-Michael Vincent, George Peppard, Dominique Sanda, Paul Winfield, Jackie Earle Haley, Kip Niven, Mark L. Taylor, Robert Donner, Murray Hamilton	
O C T O B E R	21	Ruby	Dimension Pictures	Curtis Harrington (director); George Edwards, Steve Krantz, Barry Schneider (screenplay); Piper Laurie, Stuart Whitman, Roger Davis, Janit Baldwin, Paul Kent, Len Lesser, Fred Kohler Jr., Michael Alldredge, Sal Vecchio, Crystin Sinclaire, Jack Perkins, Eddy Donno, Rory Stevens, Kip Gillespie, Mary Margaret Robinson	
O C T O B E R	28	The Serpent's Egg	Paramount Pictures	Ingmar Bergman (director/screenplay); Liv Ullmann, David Carradine, Gert Fröbe, Heinz Bennent, James Whitmore, Glynn Turman, Edith Heerdegen, Hans Quest, Paula Braend, Walter Schmidinger, Lisi Mangold, Grischa Huber, Isolde Barth, Kai Fischer, Gaby Dohm, Christian Berkel, Charles Regnier, Gunter Meisner, Hertha von Walther, Georg Hartmann, Kyra Mladeck, Fritz Straßner, Wolfgang Weiser, Paul Bürks, Toni Berger, Erna Brunell, Rosemarie Heinikel, Andrea L'Arronge, Beverly McNeely, Hans Eichler, Harry Kalenberg, Paul Burian, Heide Picha, Günter Malzacher, Hubert Mittendorf, Ellen Umlauf, Renate Grosser, Hildegard Busse, Richard Bohne, Emil Feist, Heino Hallhuber, Irene Steinbeisser	
O C T O B E R	28	Valentino	United Artists	Ken Russell (director/screenplay); Mardik Martin (screenplay); Rudolf Nureyev, Leslie Caron, Michelle Phillips, Carol Kane, Felicity Kendal, Seymour Cassel, Huntz Hall, Alfred Marks, David de Keyser, Linda Thorson, Leland Palmer, Lindsay Kemp, Peter Vaughan, Penelope Milford, Emily Bolton, Anthony Dowell, William Hootkins, Don Fellows, John Justin, Anton Diffring, Jennie Linden, Dudley Sutton	
N O V E M B E R	2	Madame Rosa	Warner Bros. Pictures	Moshé Mizrahi (director/screenplay); Simone Signoret, Michal Bat-Adam, Samy Ben-Youb, Gabriel Jabbour, Geneviève Fontanel, Claude Dauphin, Costa-Gavras, Bernard La Jarrige, Elio Bencoli, Stella Annicette, El Kebir, Ibrahim Seck, Mohamed Zinet	
N O V E M B E R	3	Pete's Dragon	Walt Disney Productions / Buena Vista Distribution	Don Chaffey (director); Malcolm Marmorstein (screenplay); Helen Reddy, Jim Dale, Mickey Rooney, Red Buttons, Shelley Winters, Sean Marshall, Jane Kean, Jim Backus, Charles Tyner, Gary Morgan, Jeff Conaway, Cal Bartlett, Charlie Callas, Walter Barnes, Al Checco, Henry Slate, Jack Collins, Robert Easton, Robert Foulk, Joe Ross, Ken Renard, Johnny Silver, Arthur Tovey	
N O V E M B E R	4	Heroes	Universal Pictures	Jeremy Kagan (director); James Carabatsos (screenplay); Henry Winkler, Sally Field, Harrison Ford, Val Avery, Olivia Cole, Hector Elias, Dennis Burkley, Tony Burton, Michael Cavanaugh, Stuart Margolin	
N O V E M B E R	4	First Love	Paramount Pictures	Joan Darling (director); Jane Stanton Hitchcock, David Freeman (screenplay); William Katt, Susan Dey, John Heard, Beverly D'Angelo, Robert Loggia, Swoosie Kurtz, Tom Lacy, June Barrett	
N O V E M B E R	4	Which Way Is Up?	Universal Pictures	Michael Schultz (director); Carl Gottlieb, Cecil Brown (screenplay); Richard Pryor, Lonette McKee, Margaret Avery, Morgan Woodward, Marilyn Coleman, BeBe Drake-Hooks, Gloria Edwards, Ernesto Hernandez, Otis Day, Morgan Roberts, Diane Rodriguez, Dolph Sweet, Timothy Thomerson, Danny Valdez, Luis Valdez, Harry Northup	
N O V E M B E R	6	Black Joy	ITC Entertainment	Anthony Simmons (director); Jamal Ali (screenplay); Norman Beaton, Trevor Thomas, Floella Benjamin, Dawn Hope, Oscar James, Paul J. Medford, Vivian Stanshall	
N O V E M B E R	14	The Turning Point	20th Century Fox	Herbert Ross (director); Arthur Laurents (screenplay); Shirley MacLaine, Anne Bancroft, Tom Skerritt, Mikhail Baryshnikov, Leslie Browne, Martha Scott, James Mitchell, Alexandra Danilova, Lisa Lucas, Philip Saunders, Antoinette Sibley, Marshall Thompson, Starr Danias, Anthony Zerbe, Daniel Levans	
N O V E M B E R	16	Close Encounters of the Third Kind	Columbia Pictures	Steven Spielberg (director/screenplay); Richard Dreyfuss, François Truffaut, Teri Garr, Melinda Dillon, Bob Balaban, J. Patrick McNamara, Warren Kemmerling, Roberts Blossom, Cary Guffey, Lance Henriksen, Merrill Connally, George DiCenzo, Amy Douglass, Alexander Lockwood, Gene Dynarski, Norman Bartold, Josef Sommer, Carl Weathers, Phil Dodds, Hal Barwood, Matthew Robbins, Bill Thurman, Luis Contreras, James Keane, John Dennis Johnston, Robert Broyles, Danyi Deats, Basil Hoffman, J. Allen Hynek, Julia Phillips, Howard K. Smith	
N O V E M B E R	18	The Mouse and His Child	Murakami-Wolf-Swenson / Sanrio	Fred Wolf (director); Russell Hoban (screenplay); Peter Ustinov, Cloris Leachman, Sally Kellerman, John Carradine, Andy Devine, Don Lake, Joan Gerber, Frank Nelson, Cliff Norton, Regis Cordic, Neville Brand, Bob Holt, Robert Ridgely, Iris Rainer, Mel Leven, Cliff Osmond, Maitzi Morgan, Charles Woolf, Alan Barzman, Marcy Swenson	
N O V E M B E R	18	The Pack	Warner Bros. Pictures	Robert Clouse (director/screenplay); Joe Don Baker, Hope Alexander-Willis, Richard B. Shull, R. G. Armstrong, Ned Wertimer, Richard O'Brien, Bibi Besch, Delos V. Smith Jr., Sherry Miles, and Paul Willson	
N O V E M B E R	18	Planet of Dinosaurs	Cineworld Pictures	James Shea (director); Jim Aupperle, Ralph Lucas (screenplay); James Whitworth, Pamela Bottaro, Louie Lawless, Harvey Shain, Charlotte Speer, Chuck Pennington, Derna Wylde, Max Thayer, Mary Appleseth	
N O V E M B E R	18	Semi-Tough	United Artists	Michael Ritchie (director); Walter Bernstein, Ring Lardner Jr. (screenplay); Burt Reynolds, Kris Kristofferson, Jill Clayburgh, Robert Preston, Lotte Lenya, Bert Convy, Brian Dennehy, Richard Masur, Carl Weathers, Roger E. Mosley, Mary Jo Catlett, Joe Kapp, Ron Silver, Jim McKrell, Peter Bromilow, Norman Alden	
N O V E M B E R	23	Kingdom of the Spiders	Dimension Pictures / Arachnid Productions Ltd.	John "Bud" Cardos (director); Alan Caillou, Richard Robinson (screenplay); William Shatner, Tiffany Bolling, Woody Strode, Altovise Davis, Lieux Dressler, David McLean, Roy Engel, Natasha Ryan, Marcy Lafferty, Joe Ross, Adele Malis-Morey	
N O V E M B E R	27	The Hobbit	Rankin/Bass / Topcraft / ABC Video Enterprises	Arthur Rankin Jr., Jules Bass (directors); Romeo Muller (screenplay); Orson Bean, Richard Boone, Hans Conried, John Huston, Otto Preminger, Cyril Ritchard, Brother Theodore, Paul Frees, Jack DeLeon, Don Messick, John Stephenson, Glenn Yarbrough, Thurl Ravenscroft	
N O V E M B E R	30	The Goodbye Girl	Warner Bros. Pictures / Metro-Goldwyn-Mayer / Rastar	Herbert Ross (director); Neil Simon (screenplay); Richard Dreyfuss, Marsha Mason, Quinn Cummings, Paul Benedict, Barbara Rhoades, Theresa Merritt, Michael Shawn, Patricia Pearcy, Marilyn Sokol, Robert Costanzo, David S. Cass Sr., Clarence Felder, Raymond J. Barry, Powers Boothe, Tom Everett, Robert Kerman, Robert Lesser, Fred McCarren, Nicholas Mele, Joe Regalbuto, Paul Willson, Nicol Williamson	
N O V E M B E R	30	Scott Joplin	Universal Pictures / Motown Productions / NBC	Jeremy Kagan (director); Christopher Knopf (screenplay); Billy Dee Williams, Clifton Davis, Margaret Avery, Eubie Blake, Godfrey Cambridge, Seymour Cassel, DeWayne Jessie, Mabel King, Taj Mahal, Sam Theard, Art Carney, David Healy, Samuel Fuller, Denise Gordy, The Commodores, Ron Taylor, Leon Charles, Fred Pinkard, Delos V. Smith Jr., Marcus Grapes, David Hubbard	
D E C E M B E R	9	The Disappearance	Hemdale Film Corporation	Stuart Cooper (director); Paul Mayersberg (screenplay); Donald Sutherland, Francine Racette, David Hemmings, John Hurt, David Warner, Peter Bowles, Virginia McKenna, Christopher Plummer, Dan Howard, Robin Sachs, Michael Eric Kramer, Michèle Magny, Christina Greatrex, Robert Korne, Maureen Beck	
D E C E M B E R	13	Goodbye Emmanuelle	Parafrance Films/ Warner Bros. Pictures / Columbia Pictures	François Leterrier (director); Monique Lange, François Leterrier, Emmanuelle Arsan (screenplay); Sylvia Kristel, Umberto Orsini, Alexandra Stewart, Jean-Pierre Bouvier, Olga Georges-Picot, and Charlotte Alexandra	
D E C E M B E R	13	The Last Wave	McElroy & McElroy / South Australian Film Corporation / Australian Film Commission	Peter Weir (director/screenplay); Tony Morphett, Petru Popescu (screenplay); Richard Chamberlain, Olivia Hamnett, Gulpilil, Nandjiwarra Amagula, Fred Parslow, Vivean Gray, Peter Carroll, Wallas Eaton, Walter Amagula, Roy Bara, Cedrick Lalara, Morris Lalara, Athol Compton, Hedley Cullen, Michael Duffield	
D E C E M B E R	16	Candleshoe	Walt Disney Productions / Buena Vista Distribution	Norman Tokar (director); David Swift, Rosemary Anne Sisson (screenplay); Jodie Foster, David Niven, Helen Hayes, Leo McKern, Vivian Pickles, John Alderson, Mildred Shay, Michael Balfour, Sydney Bromley, Veronica Quilligan, Ian Sharrock, Sarah Tamakuni, David Samuels	
D E C E M B E R	16	Saturday Night Fever	Paramount Pictures	John Badham (director); Norman Wexler (screenplay); John Travolta, Karen Lynn Gorney, Barry Miller, Joseph Cali, Paul Pape, Donna Pescow, Bruce Ornstein, Val Bisoglio, Julie Bovasso, Martin Shakar, Lisa Peluso, Sam Coppola, Denny Dillon, Fran Drescher, Monti Rock III, Robert Costanzo, Nina Hansen, Bert Michaels, Robert Weil, Donald Gantry	
D E C E M B E R	16	Telefon	United Artists / Cinema International Corporation	Don Siegel (director); Peter Hyams, Stirling Silliphant (screenplay); Charles Bronson, Lee Remick, Donald Pleasence, Tyne Daly, Alan Badel, Patrick Magee, Sheree North, Frank Marth, Helen Page Camp, Roy Jenson, Jacqueline Scott, Ed Bakey, John Mitchum, Iggie Wolfington, Hank Brandt, John Carter, Burton Gilliam, Regis Cordic, Carmen Zapata, Kathleen O'Malley, Åke Lindman, Ansa Ikonen, George O. Petrie, Cliff Emmich, Ville-Veikko Salminen, Derek Rydall, Michael Byrne	
D E C E M B E R	18	The World's Greatest Lover	20th Century Fox	Gene Wilder (director/screenplay); Gene Wilder, Carol Kane, Dom DeLuise, Fritz Feld, Ronny Graham, Danny DeVito, Rolfe Sedan, Peter Elbling, Candice Azzara, Carl Ballantine, Lou Cutell, Richard Dimitri, James Hong, David Huddleston, James Gleason, Lupe Ontiveros, Poncie Ponce, Marya Small, George Memmoli, Pat Ast, Elya Baskin, Nick Dimitri, Carol Arthur, Stanley Brock, Josip Elic, Michael McManus, Sidney Miller, Jack Riley, Billy Sands, Florence Sundstrom, Sal Viscuso	
D E C E M B E R	21	The Gauntlet	Warner Bros. Pictures / The Malpaso Company	Clint Eastwood (director); Dennis Shryack (screenplay); Clint Eastwood, Sondra Locke, Pat Hingle, William Prince, Bill McKinney, Michael Cavanaugh, Carole Cook, Mara Corday, Doug McGrath, Jeff Morris, Roy Jenson, Dan Vadis	
D E C E M B E R	22	The Choirboys	Universal Pictures / Lorimar Productions	Robert Aldrich (director); Jennifer Miller (screenplay); Charles Durning, Louis Gossett Jr., Perry King, Clyde Kusatsu, Stephen Macht, Tim McIntire, Randy Quaid, Chuck Sacci, Don Stroud, James Woods, Burt Young, Robert Webber, Jim Davis, Phyllis Davis, Susan Batson, Cheryl Smith, Barbara Rhoades, Charles Haid	
D E C E M B E R	22	Summer City	Intertropic films / Avalon Film Corporation Studio	Christopher Fraser (director); Phil Avalon (screenplay); Mel Gibson, John Jarratt, Phil Avalon, Steve Bisley, James Elliott, Abigail, and Ward "Pally" Austin, Debbie Forman, Carl Rorke, Ross Bailey, Vicki Hekimian, Karen Williams	
D E C E M B E R	25	The Duellists	Paramount Pictures / Enigma Productions / National Film Finance Consortium	Ridley Scott (director); Gerald Vaughan-Hughes (screenplay); Keith Carradine, Harvey Keitel, Albert Finney, Tom Conti, Edward Fox, Cristina Raines, Robert Stephens, John McEnery, Arthur Dignam, Diana Quick, Alun Armstrong, Maurice Colbourne, Gay Hamilton, Meg Wynn Owen, Jenny Runacre, Alan Webb, Matthew Guinness, Dave Hill, William Hobbs, W. Morgan Sheppard, Liz Smith, Hugh Fraser, Michael Irving, Tony Matthews, Pete Postlethwaite, Stacy Keach	
D E C E M B E R	25	High Anxiety	20th Century Fox	Mel Brooks (director/screenplay); Ron Clark, Rudy De Luca, Barry Levinson (screenplay); Mel Brooks, Madeline Kahn, Cloris Leachman, Harvey Korman, Ron Carey, Howard Morris, Dick Van Patten, Jack Riley, Charlie Callas, Ron Clark, Rudy De Luca, Barry Levinson, Lee Delano, Richard Stahl, Darrell Zwerling, Murphy Dunne, Albert J. Whitlock, Eddie Ryder, Sandy Helberg, Billy Sands, Ira Miller, Beatrice Colen, Hunter von Leer, Frank Campanella, Arnold Soboloff, Bernie Kuby	
D E C E M B E R	25	Opening Night	Universal Pictures / Faces Distribution	John Cassavetes (director/screenplay); Gena Rowlands, Ben Gazzara, Joan Blondell, Paul Stewart, Zohra Lampert, John Cassavetes, John Tuell, Laura Johnson, Lady Rowlands, John Finnegan, Fred Draper, Katherine Cassavetes, Louise Lewis, Carol Warren, Ray Powers	
D E C E M B E R	26	ABBA: The Movie	Warner Bros. Pictures / Polar Music / Reg Grundy Productions	Lasse Hallström (director/screenplay); Robert Caswell (screenplay); Anni-Frid Lyngstad, Benny Andersson, Björn Ulvaeus, Agnetha Fältskog, Robert Hughes, Tom Oliver, Stig Anderson, Richard Norton, Bruce Barry	
D E C E M B E R	28	Grayeagle	American International Pictures	Charles B. Pierce (director/screenplay); Brad White, Michael O. Sajbel (screenplay); Ben Johnson, Iron Eyes Cody, Lana Wood, Jack Elam, Alex Cord, Paul Fix, Charles B. Pierce, Jacob Daniels, Jimmy Clem, Cindy Butler	

== See also ==
- List of 1977 box office number-one films in the United States
- 1977 in the United States
