= Peter Fox (actor) =

American film and television actor

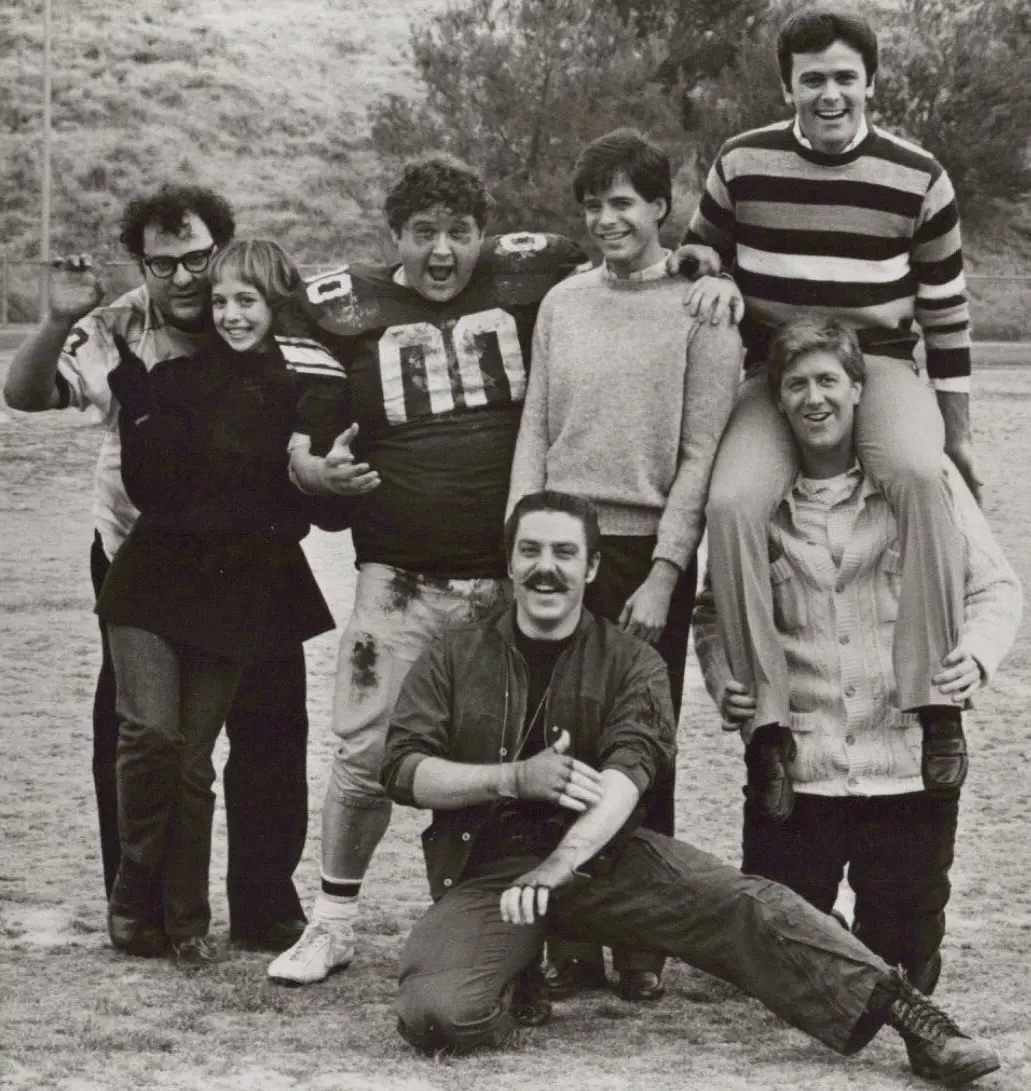
- Fox (upper right) with Josh Mostel, Wendy Goldman, Stephen Furst, Richard Seer, James Widdoes and Bruce McGill in Delta House, 1979
- Born: Wilmette, Illinois, U.S.
- Education: Harvard University
- Occupations: Film and television actor

Peter Fox is an American film and television actor. He is best known for playing the recurring role of Reverend Hank Buchanan in the American historical drama television series The Waltons.

== Life and career ==
Fox was born in Wilmette, Illinois. He attended Harvard University, and originally acted in commercials. He began his screen career in 1977, starring as Rodger Carter in the film Fraternity Row, starring along with Gregory Harrison, Scott Newman, Nancy Morgan and Wendy Phillips. In the same year, he appeared in the films Airport '77 and Young Joe, the Forgotten Kennedy, and made his television debut in the ABC mystery television series The Hardy Boys/Nancy Drew Mysteries.

Later in his career, in 1979, Fox starred as Otter in the ABC sitcom television series Delta House, starring along with John Vernon, Stephen Furst, Bruce McGill, James Widdoes, Josh Mostel and Richard Seer. He played the recurring role of Reverend Hank Buchanan in the CBS historical drama television series The Waltons, and the recurring role of Tom Jezik in the CBS soap opera television series Knots Landing. He guest-starred in numerous television programs including Hill Street Blues, The Young and the Restless, 21 Jump Street, Murder, She Wrote, The Law & Harry McGraw, Hunter, The Facts of Life, Snoops and Lou Grant. He also appeared in films such as Diamond Run, FM, Jake Speed and Night of the Comet.

Fox retired from acting in 2006, last appearing in the film Choose Connor.
