= Aaron Swartz (actor) =

British actor and theatre and film director

- Born: London, England
- Education: Drama Centre London
- Known for: Theatre, Film, television, Video Game
- Notable work: The Fourth Protocol (1987); Burn:Cycle (1994); Entrapment (1999); Do Not Disturb (1999); I Shouldn't Be Alive (2010–2012)
- Website: AaronCounselling.co.uk

Aaron Swartz is a British actor and theatre and film director who has appeared in plays, movies, commercials and television series in the United States and Europe. His first film appearance was in The Lords of Discipline, a 1983 film adaptation of the Pat Conroy novel; Swartz played a senior at an American military academy. In 1994, he played Cutter, the lead role in the video game Burn:Cycle. He appeared in 25 episodes of the documentary series I Shouldn't Be Alive (2010–2012) and has directed two films that were sold to the BBC. He has starred in the film Young Hunters: The Beast of Bevendean (2015).

Swartz also teaches Theatre arts at several English schools of drama.

== Academia ==
Swartz trained at Drama Centre London. He currently teaches Acting for Camera at the Drama Centre and at the Central School of Speech and Drama, in London, and at the Academy for Creative Training, in Brighton. He is also a lecturer in Performing Arts at Bexhill College.

== Acting and directing ==
=== Film ===
Swartz has appeared in more than 20 films, including The Lords of Discipline (1983), Claudia (1985), The Fourth Protocol (1987), Wild Things (1988), Murder by Moonlight (1991), Entrapment (1999), Do Not Disturb (1999) and The 51st State (2001). He has starred in two shorts (Blanche Maguire, 2005, and Mowing the Lawn, 2008) and in the adventure film Young Hunters: The Beast of Bevendean (Artefact, 2015).

His film directing credits include When Will I Be Famous? and The World's Greatest Fan, both sold to the BBC.

Swartz also directed a group of actors playing victims and witnesses in a staged terror attack on London, for a "pioneering" project by Columbia University's Dart Center for Journalism and Trauma intended to train journalists in trauma awareness.

=== Theatre ===
Swartz has appeared in plays at The Royal National Theatre, Oxford Playhouse, and other venues in the UK. His theatre directing credits include Mrs. Mesaroz, Hetty Bakes a Cake, What Now?, What Became of the Witch, Once a Catholic, The Arab-Israeli Cookbook and The Grandfathers.

=== Television ===
In 1984, Swartz played Herbert Jamison in an episode of The First Olympics: Athens 1896, a miniseries that won a Writers Guild of America Award. In 1986, he appeared in The Last Days of Patton, an American made-for-TV movie; in 1996, he appeared in Over Here, a British made-for-TV movie. He also appeared in 25 episodes of the documentary series I Shouldn't Be Alive (2010–2012), as the character Dan Mazur.

=== Video games ===
Swartz played the lead role of Cutter in the cyberpunk, full-motion video game Burn:Cycle (1994). According to Computer Gaming World, "the acting (with Aaron Swartz as Cutter) is better than the 'Dinner Theater 101' level that's usually the rule in computer games."
