= The Robert Guillaume Show =

- Genre: Sitcom
- Created by: Sy Rosen
- Starring: Robert Guillaume; Wendy Phillips; Marc Joseph; Ali Yurtseven; Kelsey Scott; Hank Rolike
- Composer: Kevin Guillaume
- Country of origin: United States
- Original language: English
- No. of seasons: 1
- No. of episodes: 13

Production
- Producer: Dean Zanetos
- Running time: 30 minutes
- Production companies: Guillaume-Margo Productions; New World Television

Original release
- Network: ABC
- Release: April 5 – July 19, 1989

The Robert Guillaume Show is an American sitcom television series starring Robert Guillaume that aired on ABC from April 5 to July 19, 1989.

== Synopsis ==
The series starred Guillaume as Edward Sawyer, a single father of two children, who begins an interracial relationship with Ann (Wendy Phillips), his white secretary, who has a daughter of her own.

According to Guillaume's autobiography, he conceived the series with the intent of exploring racial complexities in a family setting through comedic way, but was warned by ABC that the American public needed time to adjust to the idea of an interracial romance. Guillaume maintained that ABC deliberately sabotaged the series by airing episodes out of order and showing a kiss between Edward and Ann on the second episode instead of the intended eighth. The series was soon canceled, after only thirteen episodes.

== Cast ==
- Robert Guillaume as Edward Sawyer
- Marc Joseph as William Sawyer
- Kelsey Scott as Pamela Sawyer
- Hank Rolike as Henry Sawyer
- Wendy Phillips as Ann Sherr

== Episodes ==
No.	Title	Directed by	Written by	Original release date	U.S. viewers (millions)
1	"Hello Again"	Oz Scott	Sy Rosen	April 5, 1989	17.8
2	"Together Again"	Neema Barnette	Stephen Langford	April 12, 1989	14.3
3	"Drive, He Said"	Oz Scott	Bootsie	April 19, 1989	13.5
4	"Guaranteed Not to Shrink"	John Sgueglia	Story by : Stephen Langford; Teleplay by : Philip Fenty	April 26, 1989	14.9
5	"Educating Ann"	Arlando Smith	Hollis Rich & Maiya Williams	May 3, 1989	12.6
6	"Fast Friends"	Whitney J. LeBlanc	Maiya Williams	May 17, 1989	10.3
7	"All That Shimmers"	Oz Scott	Sy Rosen & Phil Doran	June 7, 1989	9.2
8	"They're Here"	Oz Scott	Story by : Joel Saltzman; Teleplay by : R.J. Colleary	June 14, 1989	7.5
9	"You Win Some, You Lose Some"	John Sgueglia	Hollis Rich	June 21, 1989	9.3
10	"First Date"	Oz Scott	Pam Veasey	July 5, 1989	9.4
11	"The Day After the Night Before"	Oz Scott	Phil Doran & Sy Rosen	July 12, 1989	10.1
12	"A Piece of the Rock"	Arlando Smith	Ehrich Van Lowe	July 19, 1989	10.5
