= Delta House =

1979 sitcom

- Print ad
- Genre: Sitcom
- Written by: John Hughes; Elias Davis; David Pollock; Michael Tolkin; Stephen Tolkin
- Directed by: Hollingsworth Morse; Joshua White; Carl Gottlieb
- Starring: Brian Patrick Clarke; Gary Cookson; Susanna Dalton; Peter Fox; Stephen Furst; Wendy Goldman; Peter Kastner; Bruce McGill; Josh Mostel; Richard Seer; John Vernon; James Widdoes; Lee Wilkof
- Theme music composer: Tony Hendra
- Opening theme: "Delta House" performed by Michael Simmons
- Composer: Dick DeBenedictis
- Country of origin: United States
- Original language: English
- No. of seasons: 1
- No. of episodes: 13

Production
- Executive producers: Ivan Reitman; Matty Simmons
- Producers: Elias Davis; David Pollock
- Running time: 30 minutes
- Production companies: Matty Simmons-Ivan Reitman Productions; Universal Television

Original release
- Network: ABC
- Release: January 18 – April 21, 1979

Related
- National Lampoon's Animal House

Delta House is an American sitcom that was adapted from the 1978 film National Lampoon's Animal House. The series aired from January 18 to April 21, 1979, on ABC.

== Casting ==
Cast members reprising their roles from Animal House included John Vernon (Dean Wormer), Stephen Furst (Flounder), Bruce McGill (D-Day), and James Widdoes (Hoover). Priscilla Lauris, who played Dean Wormer's secretary in the movie, also returned to reprise her role, and her character was given a name (Miss Leonard). Josh Mostel was cast as Jim "Blotto" Blutarsky, brother of Bluto, the character played in the film by John Belushi. Despite Bluto's absence (it is revealed in the pilot episode that he was expelled from college, and had been drafted into the U.S. Army), the scriptwriters made running references to his character throughout the series. In one episode, Blotto announced that he had received a letter from his brother Bluto, prompting a Delta brother to respond, "I didn't know Bluto could write," and another Delta brother to riposte, "I didn't know Blotto could read!"

Delta House also served as an early vehicle for Michelle Pfeiffer, who played "The Bombshell". She appeared in all of the episodes, with the exception of the pilot. She referred to the show as good exposure and a foot in the door. The series did not last, but she was noticed by a lot of Hollywood executives and her career picked up and she became a star soon after.

== Production and scheduling problems ==
Because of television Standards and Practices, most of the raunchy humor, sexual references and foul language featured in Animal House did not survive the transition to TV. As a result, Delta House suffered in comparison. That it aired during the so-called "family hour" (8:00 PM on Saturday nights) led to even more watering down.

In addition, the other two broadcast networks rushed onto the airwaves their own sitcoms that were "inspired" by Animal House: NBC's Brothers and Sisters and CBS' Co-Ed Fever.

Delta House initially did well in the ratings. However, executive producers Matty Simmons and Ivan Reitman's constant fights with ABC over content led the network to cancel the show after 13 episodes.

== Theme song ==
The theme song was written by Jim Steinman to lyrics written by Lampoon editors Tony Hendra and Sean Kelly. Steinman later reworked the melody into the song "Dead Ringer for Love", made famous by Meat Loaf and Cher from the album Dead Ringer, and a portion of the lyrics into the song "Tonight Is What It Means to Be Young" from the movie Streets of Fire. (Meat Loaf had been an alternate choice for the role of Bluto in Animal House had John Belushi dropped out.)

In the episode "Campus Fair", the song "Pizza Man" was performed during a beauty pageant talent showcase. It was taken from National Lampoon's Off-Broadway sketch revue Lemmings, a send-up of the Woodstock Festival, where it was originally sung by actress Alice Playten.

== Cast ==
- John Vernon as Dean Vernon Wormer, the corrupt dean of Faber College and the main nemesis of the Delta Fraternity.
- Stephen Furst as Kent "Flounder" Dorfman, an overweight and dim-witted freshman member of the Delta House.
- Bruce McGill as Daniel Simpson Day a.k.a. "D-Day," a motorcycle-riding member of the Delta House.
- James Widdoes as Robert Hoover, the strait-laced president of the Delta House.
- Josh Mostel as Jim "Blotto" Blutarsky, a transfer student and the newest member of the Delta House who takes after his older brother, John "Bluto" Blutarsky.
- Richard Seer as Larry "Pinto" Kroger, a freshman member of the Delta House and a close friend of Flounder. The role was originally played by Thomas Hulce in the feature film Animal House.
- Peter Fox as Eric "Otter" Stratton, a charismatic ladies man and a member of the Delta House. The role was originally played by Tim Matheson in Animal House.
- Gary Cookson as Douglas C. Neidermeyer, the sergeant-at-arms of the rival Omega House. The role was originally played by Mark Metcalf in Animal House.
- Susanna Dalton as Mandy Pepperidge, a cheerleader and an ally of the Omega House. The role was originally played by Mary Louise Weller in Animal House.
- Wendy Goldman as Muffy Jones, a friend of the Deltas and the girlfriend of Pinto.
- Brian Patrick Clarke as Greg Marmalard, the president of the rival Omega House. The role was originally played by James Daughton in Animal House.
- Lee Wilkof as A. S. Einswine, a member of the Delta House who deals in fabricated term papers and other shady businesses on behalf of the Deltas.
- Peter Kastner as Prof. Dave Jennings, a professor at Faber. The role was originally played by Donald Sutherland in Animal House.
- Michelle Pfeiffer as The Bombshell, an attractive anthropology student and a friend of the Deltas.

== Episodes ==
No.	Title	Directed by	Written by	Original release date
1	"The Legacy"	Alan Myerson	Harold Ramis, Douglas Kenney & Chris Miller	January 18, 1979
In this first episode, we meet the rowdy frat brothers of the Delta House on the Faber College campus in 1962 and see how they love to play pranks on the uptight preppies of the Omega House and torment Dean Wormer. First up, Jim "Blotto" Blutarsky transfers to Faber and is intent on keeping out of trouble. But after Neidermeyer pushes him too far, he unleashes the animal inside and lives up to the Blutarsky name! Meanwhile, when Flounder's paper on Political Science gets a B+, Dean Wormer suspects him of cheating and forces him to compete for the Nerdlinger award.
2	"The Shortest Yard"	Don Weis	John Hughes	January 27, 1979
Dean Wormer is impressed by how far Blotto can punt a football, so he recruits him for the football team for the upcoming big game. But when Blotto refuses to play, the Deltas secretly substitute Flounder in his place, who by his own admission does not have a sports gene in his body. So it is up to the rest of the Deltas to figure ways to help the team win and keep Flounder from...floundering on the field, and not give the Dean a reason to eject Blotto from the college.
3	"Parent's Day"	Carl Gottlieb	Ted Mann	February 3, 1979
The Deltas lure the Omegas into town and away from campus by making them believe they are leading a parade for a local Congressman. Meanwhile, the Deltas switch the Greek letters on their house and the Omegas' house. So the Deltas' moms and dads are visiting them in the clean Omega house, while the Omegas' moms and dads end up in the messy Delta house. The Deltas switch the letters back before the Omegas return. Naturally, the Omegas never find out that this has happened.
4	"The Guns of October"	Charles R. Rondeau	Richard Whitley & Russ Dvonch	February 10, 1979
A speech by John F. Kennedy during the Cuban Missile Crisis leads to Omega opening an elite bunker for survival with campus security funds. When a faulty test alarm sounds like a real warning of missiles launching, everyone goes into action, the Deltas throwing a Welcome Russians party to end all parties, while the Omegas just prepare for the end. Meanwhile, Professor Jennings gives Flounder an interesting assignment... prove that he exists!
5	"The Lady in Weighting"	Hollingsworth Morse	Matty Simmons & Tod Carroll	February 24, 1979
Dean Wormer gives Delta House one week to clean up the house for face expulsion, so they hire a house mother to help get things together. Meanwhile, Blotto enters a weightlifting contest to win the money that is required to make repairs to the house.
6	"The Draft"	Hollingsworth Morse	Matty Simmons & Tod Carroll	March 3, 1979
Dean Wormer fixes it so that D-Day receives his draft notice, so the Deltas throw him a party to see him off. But tensions arise between the Deltas after D-Day's departure, which leads to Hoover moving to the Dorm, Flounder and Pinto to a civil rights activist's pad, Otter alone in Delta House and Blotto up a tree...literally!
7	"The Deformity"	Hollingsworth Morse	John Hughes	March 10, 1979
Pinto's acne makes him self-conscious about his looks, so his frat brothers try to help him regain his confidence. Meanwhile, Dean Wormer tries angling for grant money for the science program from a visiting military officer and his best chance at getting it is Hoover's science project!
8	"Big Man on Campus"	Bruce Bilson	Stephen Tolkin & Michael Tolkin	March 17, 1979
When Kent "Flounder" Dorfman falls in love with Mandy Pepperidge, it is up to the Deltas to make her see him as the man of her dreams, the new big man on campus.
9	"The Fall of Dean Wormer"	Joshua White	Elias Davis & David Pollock	March 22, 1979
After Dean Wormer's wife finds him in his office with a young co-ed, she reports him to the trustees, who meet to vote him out and replace him. The Deltas are ready to celebrate Wormer's departure, until they find out his replacement is far worse than Wormer, so they plot to help the Dean save his job.
10	"The Blotto Who Came to Dinner"	Joshua White	Elias Davis & David Pollock	March 31, 1979
Due to poor grades, Dean Wormer happily expels Blotto. However, when the Dean accidentally hits Blotto with his car, the tables are turned and Wormer must take care of Blotto to avoid a big lawsuit.
11	"Campus Fair"	Nicholas Sgarro	John Hughes	April 5, 1979
The Delta boys plan to use The Bombshell (Michelle Pfeiffer) to win a beauty contest, but when she is sent away on an archaeological assignment, they scramble for a replacement, in which they choose the less attractive Muffy.
12	"Hoover and the Bomb"	Carl Gottlieb	Matty Simmons, Michael Tolkin & Stephen Tolkin	April 7, 1979
Hoover falls head over heels for The Bombshell and when she does not know how to let him down gently, the Deltas intervene, which leads Hoover to have a nightmare about married life!
13	"The Matriculation of Kent Dorfman"	Joshua White	John Hughes, David Pollack & Elias Davis	April 21, 1979
To the chagrin of Dean Wormer, Flounder's parents threaten to cancel their annual contribution to Faber College and move their son to another college. Unfortunately for Flounder, the only place that will accept him is a women's college.
