= Burn Cycle =

1994 video game

- CD-i cover art
- Developer: TripMedia
- Publisher: Philips Interactive Media
- Director: David Collier
- Producer: David Collier
- Programmer: Graham Deane
- Artist: Olaf Wendt
- Writer: Eitan Arrusi
- Composer: Simon Boswell
- Platforms: CD-i, Mac OS, Windows
- Release: October 1994
- Genres: Interactive film Point-and-click adventure
- Mode: Single-player

Burn Cycle (stylized as Burn:Cycle) is a 1994 point-and-click adventure video game for the CD-i that incorporates full motion video and is set in a surrealist cyberpunk world. The game follows Sol Cutter, a computer hacker and data thief, whose latest theft causes a virus named Burn Cycle to be implanted in his head. The game features a two-hour countdown timer to defuse the virus, with the player jumping back and forth between a fictional ingame virtual reality world known as the Televerse in order to destroy the Burn Cycle virus and solve the mystery of its creation.

The game was re-released for personal computers in 1995. In 1996 Philips Interactive Media announced that all of their CD-i games would be ported to the Sega Saturn and Sony PlayStation during the third quarter of 1996, starting with Burn Cycle. However, these ports were never released.

== Gameplay ==
The game is generally played in a first-person point and click style, similar to games like Myst and The 7th Guest. This is interspersed with various minigames, puzzles, and skill sequences, which the player must complete to progress. Failing certain minigames or puzzles, like the opening escape from the Softech building, will cause a game over.

At any point, the player can bring up a menu showing the remaining time before the Burn Cycle virus wipes Cutter's mind, which decreases in realtime during gameplay. From this screen, the player can save the game anywhere, and Cutter gives hints and additional information in monologue as to where to go next. When the timer reaches zero, the virus will activate, killing Sol Cutter.

The amount of time on this clock can be extended by trading for treatment drugs with Zip, an underground cybertechnology dealer at the Zero Sum Bar. Various electronic tools and keys can be collected throughout the game's world, which can either be traded or used to progress the story. The goal of the game is to fully cure Cutter of the Burn Cycle virus, and figure out why he was infected with it in the first place.

== Story ==
Sol Cutter is a former corporate operative and current small-time data thief in an unnamed metropolis who acts as a courier for stolen data using a hard drive surgically implanted in his brain. As the game opens, Cutter is on a job; breaking and entering into the corporate offices of SoftTech, his former employers, when a shock blasts him across the room. Cutter realizes his mind has been infected with a virus called Burn Cycle which will kill him in two hours. With the help of his girlfriend Kris, who is guiding him from outside the complex, Cutter barely escapes, but Kris is shot in the back and killed.

Cutter makes his way to into the city and withdraws funds from a virtual bank (which doubles as a new age style church). Realizing that his hotel room is being watched, Cutter instead makes his way to the Zero Sum Bar to deal with Zip, his friend and colleague who is strung out on "Rushing", or experiencing digitally augmented highs and adrenaline rushes. Cutter recruits Gala, a former acquaintance who Cutter recognizes from his time infiltrating a revolutionary movement where she was a member. Gala doesn't recognize him as he was undercover and his face had been surgically altered. With her help, Cutter is able to get into his hotel room and get his belongings and other tools, along with a mysterious holo-sphere. With few options left and the Burn Cycle clock continuing to count down, Cutter makes his way to Doc, an underground brain surgeon for help. Gala tags along, hoping to recruit Doc to her cause.

Once at Doc's place, Cutter is examined. While Doc goes over the data, Cutter places the holo-sphere into a scanner and unlocks a symbol of a dragon tattoo which sparks a flashback of Cutter's time as an operative. Cutter witnessed innocents being executed by his partner, the sadistic Deally. This is revealed to be the reason why he left the company and became a thief, after Deally explained that his bosses ordered the murder. Doc explains Cutter that his memories are being deleted due to the biochemical digital virus inhabiting his brain and if the clock runs out he will be effectively braindead. The only hope he has to live is to download his consciousness completely into the Televerse, the virtual world in which most of the planet does business. Once inside Cutter must seek Vielli, the CEO of Cortex, a rival multinational to SoftTech, who might have the cure. Cutter's mind is downloaded, but his code is fractured in the process.

Inside the Televerse, Cutter must track down the rogue pieces of his code, personified by a man, a strange golden Buddha and Kris. Once absorbing each piece back into himself he is finally able to enter Cortex where Vielli is waiting. Vielli explains that SoftTech were the ones who hired him to steal their own data, intending to infect him with the Burn Cycle virus knowing that he would have to seek out Vielli. Vielli, who is revealed to have died and exists solely as a program, has perfected the process for downloading consciousness into the Televerse, but also uploading it into any body, effectively inventing the code for immortality. Vielli helps Cutter to cure the Burn Cycle virus and reveals that Doc has betrayed him, being on SoftTech's payroll for years. Vielli has already warned Gala, but just as Gala shoots Doc, Deally appears and kills Gala. Deally tells Cutter that he will mutilate and eventually kill Cutter's body, stranding him in the Televerse, unless Cutter brings him the upload code.

Vielli instead uploads Cutter into a spare body (an attractive woman) and charges him with smuggling Vielli's physical head (along with the upload code) out of the country, to preserve the secret of his death and deny SoftTech access to his ideas. After acquiring the head and discovering his own unconscious body in his hotel room, Cutter is ambushed by Deally and a team of agents. Deally reveals that he was the one who murdered Kris, prompting Cutter to kill him. He manages to shoot his way out and escape, but must leave Vielli's head behind.

Cutter is attempting to flee the country when Vielli contacts him and reveals that he knew Cutter wouldn't be able to shake SoftTech and that his head didn't contain the upload code, but rather an augmented copy of Burn Cycle, which wipes out SoftTech overnight, completely destroying all of their data. Vielli congratulates Cutter and gives him an infinite number of bank accounts which can be accessed anywhere in the world. When asked what the catch is, Vielli simply states that he doesn't kill employees and that Cutter should consider the money a retainer for further services. Cutter, in voice-over, muses about what his new body will look like with an all over tan.

== Development and promotion ==
The game, written by Eitan Arrusi for TripMedia, London, features live action characters. Arrusi and Darius Fisher were the director and assistant director, respectively. The FMVs and in-game graphics were shot on a blue screen, as backgrounds are composed of 3D renders. The effect is that navigation through Burn Cycle's environments cues a 3D walkthrough, while interaction with characters or the activation of scripted events prompts the loading of overlaid camera footage, sometimes even with complete scene changes.

The game's live action cast are credited as follows:

- Aaron Swartz as Cutter
- Viva Duce as Kris
- Abigail Canton as Gala
- Tanya Pohlkotte as Female Cutter
- Indra Sinha as the Golden Buddha

The 1995 re-release for personal computers was preceded by an early use of marketing a video game through the Internet. The official Burn Cycle website featured original content set in the game's world that was intended to serve as a precursor to the events depicted in the game. The site also featured various promotions and allowed visitors to sign up for an e-mail list that sent out hints for the game. The website was hosted at http://burncycle.com/ (Archived).

== Soundtrack ==
Burn Cycle features a largely techno soundtrack, composed and performed by the partnership of Simon Boswell and Chris Whitten. The game came packaged with a soundtrack CD that could be played on the CD-i or on any conventional CD player. Some of the songs on the soundtrack are remixed with dialogue from the game's voice actors.

Track listing
No.	Title	Length
1.	"Burn:Cycle Theme"	9:27
2.	"Karmic Church"	4:07
3.	"Flying"	4:59
4.	"System Software"	6:49
5.	"Buddha's Voice"	4:46
6.	"Into the Televerse"	7:08
7.	"Psychic Roulette"	5:11
8.	"Zip"	7:55
9.	"Kris VR"	4:29
10.	"A Beautiful Relationship"	4:21
11.	"Meltdown"	6:04

== Reception ==
Reception

Review scores
Publication	Score
Computer Game Review	66/68/68 (PC)
Edge	7/10 (CD-i)
GameRevolution	A− (PC)
Next Generation	3/5 (CD-i)
PC Gamer (UK)	71% (PC)
Entertainment Weekly	A−
Power Unlimited	94% (CD-i)

The CD-i version of Burn Cycle has been viewed as one of the most prominent titles on its system, with Electronic Gaming Monthly awarding it "Best CD-i Game of 1994" in their Buyer's Guide, and GamePro calling it "just what the CD-i needed". The magazines lauded the game's audio and cinematics. GamePro gave it a 5/5 score for three categories (graphics, sound, and fun factor), rating control at 4.5. 1UP.com, impressed by its futuristic setting and storyline, referred to Burn Cycle as "one of the best showcases of the console's strengths."

The PC release received a mixed response from critics. Allgame praised the variety of characters and locations, but stated that the game's graphics were "extremely crude looking and hurtful to the eyes". PC Gamer commented that "the blend of puzzles, arcade action, mysteries and cyberspace won't be too interesting"; the game's cyberpunk atmosphere and music were listed as positive aspects. In contrast, Game Revolution criticized the soundtrack for being "just bad industrial". The website nonetheless considered Burn Cycle "well-balanced" and its environments "carefully planned", giving the game an A− along with Entertainment Weekly.

Next Generation reviewed the CD-i version of the game, rating it three stars out of five, and stated that "Newcomers to gaming will be amazed at Burn:Cycle's beauty. Experienced arcade thrashers will wonder what the fuss is about." Power Unlimited gave the CD-i version a score of 94% writing: "Burn:Cycle is, according to some, the next level in gaming. A game with the quality, atmosphere and music of a real feature film, while the gameplay is also impressive. Due to the good dose of excitement and variety, it is highly recommended."
