= The First Olympics: Athens 1896 =

- Genre: Period drama Sports; Miniseries
- Teleplay by: Charles Gary Allison; William Bast
- Story by: Charles Gary Allison
- Directed by: Alvin Rakoff
- Starring: David Caruso; Hunt Block; David Ogden Stiers; Angela Lansbury
- Theme music composer: Bruce Broughton
- Country of origin: United States
- Original language: English
- No. of episodes: 2

Production
- Executive producer: Larry White
- Producers: Charles Gary Allison; William Hill
- Cinematography: Paul Beeson
- Editors: John Grover; Ralph Sheldon
- Running time: 237 minutes
- Production companies: Larry White/Gary Allison Productions; Columbia Pictures Television

Original release
- Network: NBC
- Release: May 20 – May 21, 1984

The First Olympics: Athens 1896 is a 1984 American television miniseries produced by Columbia Pictures Television for broadcast by the NBC network. This television miniseries tells the story of the founding of the modern Olympics by focusing on individuals in several countries and their preparations and eventual competition in Athens in 1896. The two-part mini-series originally aired in the United States on May 20 and 21, 1984.

== Plot ==
The preparation and events leading up to the inaugural modern Olympic Games held in Athens, 1896. The movie examines the experience of competitors from different nations, but especially concentrates on the creation of the first American Olympic team and their trials in getting to the Olympics in Athens. The series ends with a voice over giving brief descriptions of the various historical individuals that took part.

== Cast ==
- Louis Jourdan as Pierre de Coubertin, founder of the International Olympic Committee
- David Ogden Stiers as William Milligan Sloane, founder of the United States Olympic Committee
- Hunt Block as Robert Garrett, United States athlete
- David Caruso as James Brendan Connolly, United States athlete
- Alex Hyde-White as Arthur Blake, United States athlete
- Hutton Cobb as Thomas Burke, United States athlete
- Jason Connery as Thomas Curtis, United States athlete
- Ian Morton as Ellery Harding Clark, United States athlete
- William Armstrong as William Hoyt, United States athlete
- Aaron Swartz as Herbert Jamison, United States athlete
- Keith Edwards as Albert Tyler, United States athlete
- Terrance Conder as Sumner Paine, United States athlete
- Peter Merrill as John Paine, United States athlete
- Matt Frewer as Francis Lane, United States athlete
- Robert Addie as Grantley Goulding, British athlete
- Benedict Taylor as Edwin Flack, Australian athlete
- Nicos Ziagos as Spiridon Louis, Greek athlete
- Edward Wiley as John Graham, American coach
- Angela Lansbury as Alice Garrett, Robert Garrett's mother
- Honor Blackman as Madam Ursula Schumann
- Gayle Hunnicutt as Mary Sloane
- Bill Travers as Harold Flack
- Virginia McKenna as Annabel Flack

== Historical inaccuracies in the series ==
- Louis Jourdan was 63 when he played the role of Pierre de Coubertin, who was 33 in 1896. He was also considerably taller than Pierre de Coubertin.
- James Connolly is told by Coach Graham and the dean of students at Harvard that he and Arthur Blake will be volunteering for the new U.S. Olympic Team as punishment for fighting with each other. In reality, after Connolly was denied a leave of absence to compete in the Games, he dropped out and competed anyway.
- It is noted that Edwin Flack is from a family of butchers, and he would be interrupting his studies at Oxford University to compete in the Games. In reality, he was taking a month's holiday from his job as an accountant at the firm of Price, Waterhouse, and Company, which later bought out his family's firm.
- Three Greek flags are raised after the finish of the Marathon, but it is not mentioned that the third Greek finisher, Spiridon Belokas, was later disqualified after he was found to have ridden part of the way in a carriage. Gyula Kellner of Hungary was elevated to third place.
- When athletes first competed in the Olympics, they only represented their clubs or their schools. They did not start participating on official national teams or marching in a Parade of Nations until the London Games of 1908. Also, the first team to appear in the (anachronistic) Parade at the opening ceremony of the Games is Australia, but the Commonwealth of Australia was not officially formed until 1901.
- Robert Garrett is incorrectly portrayed as being a participant in the marathon. Arthur Blake was the only American entrant in the event, and he did not finish.
- In an incident similar to the one with an oversized discus, Robert Garrett is seen trying to enter the shot put with an oversized shot put. In reality, unlike the incident with the discus (which is very well documented), there is no record of a similar incident with the shot put having taken place.
- James Connolly is portrayed as having emigrated to America from Ireland, but he was actually born in Boston in 1868; it was Connolly's parents who emigrated to America.
- Blake is shown placing second in the 800 meters in a thrilling finish, and Edwin Flack brings him onto the first place podium. In reality, Blake was actually second to Flack in the 1500 meters - which was decided in the last 100 meters - and didn't run the 800. The 800 meters silver medal went to Nándor Dáni of Hungary, with the actual winning margin being five meters.
- In the hurdles race, the technique for hurdling shown, leading with one leg lifted over the hurdles before the other was not pioneered until the 1900 Olympic Games in Paris by the American athlete Alvin Kraenzlein. Prior to this, the then existing mode of leaping the hurdles was with both legs tucked under the body.

== Awards and nominations ==
Primetime Emmy Awards

Year	Category	Award	Nominee(s)	Result
1984	Outstanding Achievement in Music Composition for a Limited Series or a Special (Dramatic Underscore)	Emmy	Bruce Broughton (for "Part 1")	Won
1984	Outstanding Art Direction for a Limited Series or a Special	Emmy	Michael Stringer (production designer) Fred Carter (art director); Petros Kapouralis (art director); Terry Parr (set decorator)	Nominated
1984	Outstanding Supporting Actor in a Limited Series or Special	Emmy	David Ogden Stiers	Nominated

Writers Guild of America, USA

Year	Category	Award	Nominee(s)	Result
1985	Original/Adapted Multi-Part Long Form Series	WGA Award (TV)	Charles Gary Allison (teleplay/story); William Bast (teleplay)	Won

Casting Society of America, USA

Year	Category	Award	Nominee(s)	Result
1985	Best Casting for TV Miniseries' or TV Movie of the Week	Artios	Fran Bascom	Nominated
