= Hunt Block =

American actor

- Born: Huntington MacDonald Block; February 16, 1953 (age 73); Washington, D.C., U.S.
- Years active: 1981–present

Huntington Macdonald Block (born February 16, 1953), known as Hunt Block, is an American actor.

Block is the son of Huntington T. Block, an insurance underwriter, and is the brother of film producer, Bill Block. He lives in Connecticut.

== Career ==
Hunt Block graduated with a Bachelor of Fine Arts degree from Harvard University (with an emphasis on Anthropology and Film Studies) but was discovered selling Buick Century automobiles at the Chicago Auto Show. Early in his career, an agent saw him in an off-off-Broadway show and helped find him soap and commercial jobs. Thus he made numerous TV commercials, short films, and experimental theater pieces. In his youth he spent a summer working with the Sioux Indians in South Dakota and has spent time in Bolivia and Fiji.

While living in Tribeca in New York City, he performed in stage and Broadway productions for Arthur Laurents, Edward Albee, Robert Smith, and Doric Wilson. He appeared in William Shakespeare's As You Like It, Forever After, A Loss Of Memory, Provicante di Saliva, The Bald Soprano, and Make Mine Kafka!

Block has worked with film directors Arthur Hiller, Peter Medak, Lee Katzin, Alvin Rakoff, and Phillip Noyce. He has played the roles of U.S. President Howard Lewis in the film Salt, Sebastian Weinberg in My Best Day, Walter Hill in Only I..., and the U.S. Olympian Robert Garrett (1875–1961), a young scion of a wealthy Baltimore railroad and financier family in the TV miniseries The First Olympics: Athens 1896.

When he first moved to L.A. he was cast as a wind surfer in a TV movie, Summer Girl. Since then, Block has had starring roles in several other television movies and television pilots, and has appeared steadily in lead roles in several dramatic serials, such as Knots Landing, and numerous TV daytime dramas, including Guiding Light, All My Children, As the World Turns, and One Life to Live.

== Filmography ==
=== Movies ===
Year	Title	Role	Notes
1981	Waitress!	Bill	credited as David Hunt
1984	The Lonely Guy	Louise's Date - in Bar	
2010	Salt	U.S. President Lewis	
2012	My Best Day	Sebastian	
2012	Young(ish)	Middle Aged Man	short film
2015	Only I...	Walter Hill	

=== Television ===
Year	Title	Role	Notes
1983	Summer Girl	Peter Mitchell	TV movie
1984	Hill Street Blues	Tony Heedlock	Episode: "Lucky Ducks"
1984	The First Olympics: Athens 1896	Robert Garrett	TV miniseries
1985	Secret Weapons	Jack Spaulding	TV movie
1985	Otherworld	Captain Valdor	Episode: "Princess Metra"
1985–87	Knots Landing	Peter Hollister	Recurring role (seasons 7–9)
1988	The Equalizer	Steiner	Episode: "Video Games"
1988	The Dirty Dozen: The Fatal Mission	Joseph Stern	TV movie
1988	CBS Summer Playhouse	Elliot	Anthology series, Episode: "Some Kinda Woman"
1988	She Was Marked for Murder	Eric Chandler	TV movie
1989, 1991, 1992	Murder, She Wrote	Jonas Beckwith / Reuben Stoltz / Father Donald Barnes	3 episodes
1990	Project: Tinman	The Man	TV movie
1991	Bloodlines: Murder in the Family		TV movie
1993	Baywatch	Simon	Episode: "Sky Rider"
1997–2000	Guiding Light	Ben Warren	Soap opera, 106 episodes
2000	All My Children	Guy Donohue	Soap opera, 3 episodes
2000–05	As the World Turns	Craig Montgomery	Soap opera, 335 episodes
2007–08	One Life to Live	Lee Ramsey	Soap opera, 78 episodes
2011	Suits	Rival Attorney	Episode: "Pilot"
