= The Dirty Dozen: The Fatal Mission =

1988 American made-for-TV movie

- Official DVD cover
- Genre: Action; Adventure; War
- Written by: Mark Rodgers
- Directed by: Lee H. Katzin
- Starring: Telly Savalas; Ernest Borgnine; Hunt Block; Matthew Burton; Alex Cord; Heather Thomas; Erik Estrada; Ernie Hudson
- Music by: John Cacavas
- Country of origin: United States
- Original language: English

Production
- Producer: Mel Swope
- Production location: Zagreb, Croatia
- Cinematography: Tomislav Pinter
- Editors: Leon Carrere; Richard E. Rabjohn
- Running time: 94 min.
- Production companies: MGM/UA Television; RAI Radiotelevisione Italiana; Jadran Film

Original release
- Network: NBC
- Release: February 14, 1988

The Dirty Dozen: The Fatal Mission is a 1988 made-for-TV film directed by Lee H. Katzin, and is the third sequel to the 1967 Robert Aldrich film The Dirty Dozen. It features an all-new "dirty dozen", with the exception of the returning Joe Stern, under the leadership of Major Wright (played by Telly Savalas). The plot concerns Major Wright and his convict commando squad attempting to stop 12 top Nazis, who are trying to organize a Fourth Reich.

== Plot ==
Major Wright leads a group of commandos in Nazi-occupied Denmark to meet up with informant Carl Ludwig, who is being followed by a German patrol. Ludwig is shot, and before he succumbs to his wounds, utters the phrase, "vierundzwanzig, zwanzig" (2420), which Major Wright does not understand.

Back in England, Major Wright, Major General Worden, Lieutenant Carol Campbell and a British Lieutenant Colonel meet in London to discuss German plans for developing a Fourth Reich in the Middle East. SS General Kurt Richter has selected loyal and influential Nazis to be transported to Istanbul and plan to travel by train from Munich along the old Orient Express route through neutral Turkey. Major Wright is ordered to recruit twelve men from Forbes Road Military Prison for a suicide mission: prevent the train from reaching its destination and kill Richter's loyalists. They will be riding in Orient Express train car #2420.

Major Wright and Sergeant Holt train a new 'dirty dozen', who must take their first and last parachute training jumps at night due to time constraints. Hoffman is killed when his parachute doesn't open due to sabotage. On their final day of training, Wright reports his belief that a traitor in the 'dirty dozen' is feeding information to the Germans. General Worden and the Colonel want to abort the mission, but Major Wright convinces them he'll find the traitor. Figuring the alerted Germans will wait for them at the drop zone, he orders the pilots to drop them in Skopje instead.

In Skopje, Major Wright and Demchuk meet the resistance leader Yelena Voskovic. The dozen and the resistance group successfully destroy a checkpoint to the railroad, but Munoz is killed. In Sofia, the group infiltrates the train at a bridge and searches the train cars for Richter's loyalists. Wilson and Porter are killed, Hamilton and Echevarria are wounded, and Demchuk seizes control of the locomotive. The loyalists are locked in car #2420 and Major Wright decides to hold them as hostages. The Germans attempt to block the train with a tanker car and Demchuck halts the train. D'Agostino is caught placing a grenade on the tanker and killed by Major Wright as a traitor. Wright attaches the tanker to the front of the train and they continue to Dranos, where they encounter a German roadblock.

Major Wright orders everyone but Richter's men to evacuate and the Germans attack the train. In the ensuing battle, Ricketts is mortally wounded and Mitchell and Demchuk are killed as the train plows through the roadblock. The German defenders are killed in the explosion, with Richter and the loyalists in car #2420.

Major Wright and the survivors rendezvous with a British submarine in the Aegean Sea and Yelena returns to Yugoslavia to join Tito's partisans. Major Wright and Sergeant Holt return to the UK with the survivors of the 'dirty dozen': Joseph Stern, Lieutenant Campbell, Joseph Hamilton, Fred Collins and Roberto Echevarria.

== Cast ==
- Telly Savalas as Major Wright
- Ernest Borgnine as Major General Sam Worden
- Jeff Conaway as Sergeant Holt
- Hunt Block as Joseph Stern, One of The Dirty Dozen
- Matthew Burton as SS-Gruppenführer Kurt Richter
- Alex Cord as Dravko Demchuk, One of The Dirty Dozen
- Erik Estrada as Carmine D'Agostino, One of The Dirty Dozen
- Ernie Hudson as Joseph Hamilton, One of The Dirty Dozen
- Heather Thomas as Lieutenant Carol Campbell
- James Carroll Jordan as Lonnie Wilson, One of The Dirty Dozen
- Natalia Nogulich as Yelena Voskovich
- Ray Mancini as Tom Ricketts, One of The Dirty Dozen
- John Matuszak as Frederick Collins, One of The Dirty Dozen
- Anthony Valentine as Colonel Clark
- Richard Yniguez as Roberto Echevarria, One of The Dirty Dozen
- Ranko Zidarić as Vasko Petrovich
- Derek Hoxby as Thomas Hoffman, One of The Dirty Dozen
- Branko Blače as Munoz, One of The Dirty Dozen
- Robert Bobinac as Porter, One of The Dirty Dozen
- Budimar Sobat as Mitchell, One of The Dirty Dozen
