= Susanna Dalton =

American actress

- Occupation: Television actress

Susanna Dalton is an American actress, who made her TV debut in 1979 in the Show Delta House as Mandy Pepperidge. She also played C.C. Brandt in Stunts Unlimited (1980), Gloria in Paternity (1981) and Nancy Barwood in A Little Sex (1982).
