= Charles Gary Allison =

American screenwriter and film producer (1938–2008)

- Born: 1938
- Died: May 13, 2008 (aged 69–70); Los Angeles
- Occupations: Screenwriter and film producer

Charles Gary Allison (1938 – May 13, 2008) was an American screenwriter and film producer.

== Early life and education ==
Allison spent the first years of his life in London, returning to the United States in 1944. He grew up living simultaneously in Washington, D.C. and Los Angeles, attending school in Washington, D.C., Los Angeles, England, Tokyo, Saigon, and Hong Kong. He obtained his undergraduate degree in international relations from the University of Southern California in 1960, where he was a member of the Lambda Chi Alpha fraternity.

== Career ==
From 1961 to 1963, he served as a White House social aide during the John F. Kennedy administration. From 1963 to 1969 he chaired a non-partisan White House youth program under both the Lyndon B. Johnson and Richard M. Nixon administrations, during which time he worked on a master's degree in international relations at Georgetown University.

Allison returned to the University of Southern California in 1973 to obtain two master's degrees (in cinema production and professional writing) and a Ph.D. in philosophy. In 1977, he wrote and produced Fraternity Row for Paramount Pictures, which won him numerous industry awards. He worked continuously on a number of studio films in the U.S. and abroad, and also wrote and produced The First Olympics: Athens 1896 (1984), a TV mini-series for Columbia Pictures Television. The mini-series aired on NBC in 1984, and depicts the adventures of the United States' first Olympic team at the Athens 1896 Games. "The First Olympics", which received a number of Emmy nominations and awards, also won Allison the WGA Annual Award for Outstanding Script of 1984 (Television Long Form Series) from his colleagues at the Writers Guild of America.

In 1978, Allison helped to found and served as co-chair of the Utah/US Film Festival with Robert Redford, which would later go on to become the Sundance Film Festival.

Allison began work in 1984 on "The Olympic Century", the official 25 volume history of the modern Olympic movement, in a cooperative partnership with the International Olympic Committee and several national Olympic committees. The series will be available to teachers, schools, students and libraries beginning in the Fall of 2008. In 1987, the series development was designated 1st Century Project with Allison serving as chairman, which he has done up and until the present time.

Allison died at his home in Los Angeles, May 13, 2008. Allison was widowed in 1997 and is survived by one son, Richard, who lives and works in London, England.
