= Grand Theft Auto (film) =

1977 American film by Ron Howard

- Theatrical release poster by John Solie
- Directed by: Ron Howard
- Written by: Rance Howard; Ron Howard
- Produced by: Jon Davison
- Starring: Ron Howard; Nancy Morgan; Marion Ross; Peter Isacksen; Don Steele; Clint Howard
- Cinematography: Gary Graver
- Edited by: Joe Dante
- Music by: Peter Ivers
- Distributed by: New World Pictures
- Release date: June 18, 1977
- Running time: 84 minutes
- Country: United States
- Language: English
- Budget: $602,000
- Box office: $15 million or $2.5 million

Grand Theft Auto is a 1977 American road action comedy film starring and directed by Ron Howard, in his feature film directorial debut. Howard also wrote the screenplay with his real-life father Rance Howard, who also co-starred in the film. As of 2025, this is the only film that Howard has both directed and starred in. The film takes its title from the crime grand theft auto, which is committed a number of times by several different characters.

In the film, a wealthy political candidate pressures his daughter to marry a similarly wealthy suitor instead of her current love interest. The daughter steals her parents' car and flees towards Las Vegas with her love interest. Her unwanted suitor steals another car and chases her. He also offers a reward to whoever can catch the woman for him. The suitor is himself chased by his worried mother.

== Plot ==
In Los Angeles, wealthy couple Bigby and Priscilla Powers, want their daughter Paula to marry Collins Hedgeworth, who also hails from a wealthy family. Paula is really in love with classmate Sam Freeman, whom Bigby dismisses as a "fortune hunter." Bigby is running for governor and wants her to cooperate. However, Paula refuses to marry Collins and plans to elope with Sam to Las Vegas. Bigby threatens to disinherit her and take away her sports car (that she bought with her own money) if she disobeys him.

Paula later flees, stealing her parents' car (Note: More specifically, a Rolls-Royce Silver Cloud.) and hitting the road with Sam to Las Vegas. Bigby calls his associate Ned Slinker, asking him to bring back Paula and the car, and to have Sam incarcerated, without involvement of police and news media. Priscilla gets a call from Collins and tells him Paula ran off. Enraged, Collins takes off in his car. After crashing it, he steals another car from a nearby dealership to continue the chase. His mother Vivian learns of this and decides to go after him before the police could arrest him.

Collins catches up with Paula and Sam on the Interstate, but ends up crashing the stolen car. Before stealing another car, he calls the TenQ radio station to DJ Curly Q. Brown, offering $25,000 to whoever can catch her. Several people, including mechanics Ace and Sparky, set off after Paula and Sam. Vivian also calls TenQ, offering $25,000 for Collins's safe return. While running a red light, she attracts the attention of Officer Norman Tad, who chases after her. After she crashes into a tree, Tad attempts to arrest her. Her blurting out trying to save Collins is overheard by a nearby preacher, who steals the police car to collect the reward money. Vivian continues the chase, prompting Tad to commandeer a bus.

After hearing a radio listener call-in saying that Sam ought to be shot, Paula calls the station from the car phone and tells her side of the story. Upon hearing it, Curly announces that he will root for them. He goes up in a helicopter to follow Paula and Sam, sharing their location and attracting more people to collect the reward as a result. When Collins crashes his stolen car, the preacher attempts to catch him and collect his money, but Collins convinces him to chase after Paula with him to double the reward. Tad arrests Vivian and drags her onto the bus with him, as they continue the chase after Paula and Sam.

As Paula and Sam cross the Nevada state line, Slinker hires a Vegas mob to try to stop them. The pursuing cars all end up in a demolition derby. The couple's car is destroyed, with Paula and Sam bailing out before, causing a massive pile-up. The crowd cheers them on. In a van, Bigby and Slinker chase after Paula and Sam, but derby cars crash into them. Paula and Sam reach the grandstand, and the crowd lets them through. As Bigby, Slinker, Collins and the preacher reach the bleachers, the crowd boos them and pelts them with food, allowing Paula and Sam to flee in a taxi, as the police arrives and arrests the pursuers. When Vivian reaches her son, she tells him not to fret about Paula, calling her "socially inferior." Noticing the way they talk about Paula, Bigby starts a fight, attempting to defend her honor. This event makes him concede that perhaps Paula did marry the right man.

At the chapel, Paula and Sam are married, and the minister asks for their autographs. While exiting the chapel, they are surrounded by fans, including a hotel owner offering them a free stay in a honeymoon suite, alongside a ride there in a limousine. As they go to the hotel, Curly pursues them in a station wagon to get them to do an interview, but misses an oncoming firetruck and ends up crashing through a house into a swimming pool. Paula and Sam, meanwhile, kiss.

== Cast ==
- Ron Howard as Sam Freeman
- Nancy Morgan as Paula Powers
- Elizabeth Rogers as Priscilla Powers
- Barry Cahill as Bigby Powers
- Rance Howard as Ned Slinker
- Paul Linke as Collins Hedgeworth
- Marion Ross as Vivian Hedgeworth
- Don Steele as Curly Brown
- Jack Perkins as Shadley
- Paul Bartel as Groom
- Bill Conklin as Engle Hingleman
- Garry Marshall as Underworld Boss
- Robby Weaver as Harold Hingleman
- Leo Rossi as Vegas Muscle Chief
- James Ritz as Officer Norman Tad
- Allan Arkush as Happy the Clown
- Pete Isacksen as Sparky
- Clint Howard as Ace

== Production ==
When executive producer Roger Corman was testing titles for Eat My Dust!, Grand Theft Auto came a close second as a possible title. So, when making a follow-up, he decided to call it Grand Theft Auto.

The film was made on a budget of $602,000. It was filmed in and around Victorville, California. Roger Corman worked as an executive producer, along with Rance Howard, who also co-wrote the script with Ron Howard. When Howard pleaded Corman for an extra half day to reshoot a scene, Corman responded: "Ron, you can come back if you want, but nobody else will be there".

== Release ==
=== Home media ===
Grand Theft Auto was released on Region One DVD in 1999 and re-released in 2006 and 2008.

== Reception ==
The film was a commercial success, earning over $15 million at the box office, but critical reception was negative. It holds a rating of 29% on Rotten Tomatoes based on 14 reviews.

=== Critical response ===
Colin Jacobson of DVD Movie Guide wrote in his review: "One might excuse the idiocy of Auto due to its drive-in “B-movie” origins. At no point does the flick pretend to be anything more than a wacky romp in the vein of It's a Mad, Mad, Mad, Mad World. It takes a variety of nutty cartoon characters and sends them on a quest for wealth." Roger Ebert of the Chicago Sun-Times wrote in his review: "Movies like Ron Howard‘s Grand Theft Auto may not have vast artistic ambitions, but in the nitty-gritty summer movie market they’re important factors. They’re part of a subgenre I guess you could call the Chase-n-Crash Movie, since dozens of cars, trucks, buses and other vehicles fly through the air, crash and burst into flame in the midst of a rudimentary story line." The New York Times review said: "The PG rating is doubtless attributable to a bit of the language—nothing out of the ordinary, really—and to the fact that the young lovers make it clear that they have a strong sexual attraction for each other."

== Cancelled remake ==
The screenplay for a remake of Grand Theft Auto, written by Jason Dean Hall, appeared in the 2008 Black List, and was subsequently set to be produced by Corman, Stuart Parr, and Paul Rosenberg for Fox Atomic (although it never came to fruition); due to the script's deviations from the original film; initially it was incorrectly assumed to be an adaptation for the similarly titled Grand Theft Auto video games.
