= Stephen Mendillo =

American actor (1940–2025)

- Born: October 9, 1940; New Haven, Connecticut, U.S.
- Died: September 3, 2025 (aged 84); Los Angeles, California, U.S.
- Education: Yale School of Drama (BA)
- Occupation: Actor
- Years active: 1972–2023
- Known for: Slap Shot, Broadcast News

Stephen Wetmore Mendillo (1940–2025) was an American actor. He portrayed hockey player Jim Ahern in the 1977 comedy Slap Shot, which starred Paul Newman. Mendillo also had an appearance as the father of William Hurt's anchor character in Broadcast News.

Mendillo was born in New Haven, Connecticut, on October 9, 1940. He attended the Yale School of Drama.

He died on September 3, 2025, at the age of 84.
