= Fraternity Row (film) =

1977 film by Thomas Joseph Tobin

- Directed by: Thomas J. Tobin
- Written by: Charles Gary Allison
- Produced by: Charles Gary Allison; Thomas Joachim; Thomas Pope
- Starring: Peter Fox; Gregory Harrison; Scott Newman; Nancy Morgan; Wendy Phillips
- Narrated by: Cliff Robertson
- Cinematography: Peter Gibbons
- Edited by: Eugene Fournier
- Music by: Michael Corner; Theme song by Don McLean
- Distributed by: Paramount Pictures
- Release date: June 3, 1977
- Running time: 105 minutes
- Country: United States
- Language: English
- Box office: $290,674 (US)

Fraternity Row is a 1977 American drama film portraying life in a 1950s fraternity at a fictional college directed by Thomas J. Tobin. The film takes place in the spring of 1954 at Summit College, a fictional college in Erie, Pennsylvania.

== Plot ==
The film begins with narration by Rodger Carter, now an adult who is recalling his fraternity days. He describes the Gamma Nu Pi fraternity as including the brightest scholars, the best athletes, and future politicians, but excluding Blacks and Jews. Over fifteen weeks, the new pledges of Gamma Nu Pi go through the initiation process under pledge master Rodger Carter.

Fraternity member Charles G. “Chunk” Cherry makes the pledges dress in silly costumes and takes them to the Kappa Delta Alpha sorority house. There, pledge Zac Sterling meets and connects with KDA pledge Jennifer Harris. Later that night, Zac is elected president of the pledge class. Zac becomes friends with Rodger; in private, they talk about The Great Gatsby. Later, Rodger tells the active members of the fraternity that he is against the practice of hazing. Chuck does not agree, but does not speak up.

The campus newspaper takes a photograph of pledge leaders Zac and Jennifer, during which Jennifer shares her interest in Zac. Later, the two talk to fellow student Jim Jenson in the hallway, but a told by Chuck that they cannot associate with Jim because he left Gamma Nu and joined another fraternity. That night, there is a celebration at the KDA house when Rodger presents his fraternity pin to KDA member Betty Ann. When Chuck calls Zac a "pledge" and demands participation in singing, Jennifer says Chuck has no authority on KDA property. Zac disappointed Jennifer when he leaves her and concedes to Chuck's demands because he fears retribution.

When pledge Lloyd Pope's father, who is a diplomat, is accused of being a communist by Senator Joseph McCarthy and resigns from office, the active fraternity members follow Chuck's demands and expel Lloyd from the fraternity. Zac and Lloyd were friends in high school. Zac tries to organize the pledges to walk out in protest, but finds no participants. That night, Jennifer expresses her disgust with the Greek system, suggesting that they both resign and get an apartment together. Zac contends that he can fix the fraternity from within.

For a project, the pledges enter a contest to get the WSAS radio station to the Budapest String Quartet for 24 hours straight. Chuck begins to harass Zac, making him eat a raw onion for a minor infraction. Rodger tries to intervene. The fraternity and sorority hold a dance to raise money for more entries in the radio station's contest. Jennifer shows everyone the Birdland line date; Betty Ann uses a racist term to complain to Chuck about the dance's African American origins. After the pledges win the radio station contest, alumnus Brother Abernathy commends the pledges at a formal fraternity dinner.

Betty Ann and Rodger break up at a lawn party at Brother Abernathy's house. At the same party, Jennifer and Zac also break up after he again refuses to leave Gamma Nu. However, when Lloyd is not restored to the fraternity after his father is cleared of all charges, Zac walks out of the fraternity house. Rodger convinces Zac to return, only to be accused by Chuck of siding with the pledges. Chuck calls Rodger out at a meeting of the fraternity's active members, demanding that traditional hazing be continued. Chuck is elected to replace Rodger as pledge master, right before the final initiation period called Hell Week.

Hell Week includes the Ceremony of the Griffin, where blindfolded pledges must kneel before an altar wearing only underwear and a bow tie. The pledges are smeared with eggs and are fed raw liver by Chuck, acting as the Griffin. When Chuck gives Zac a piece of liver that is too large, Zac chokes. Despite Rodger's efforts, Zac is dead when the ambulance arrives. The ambulance attendants reprimand the fraternity brothers for their "silly pranks". Rodger goes to attack Chuck, but stops when he realizes that the pledge master and all fraternity members are also ashamed and shocked. Recalling their discussion about the Fitzgerald novel, Rodger notes that Zac will always represent the "eternal dreamer".

== Cast ==
- Peter Fox as Rodger Carter
- Gregory Harrison as Zac Sterling
- Scott Newman as Chunk Cherry
- Nancy Morgan as Jennifer Harris
- Wendy Phillips as Betty Ann Martin
- Robert Emhardt as Brother Bob Abernathy
- Cliff Robertson as The Narrator
- Dean Smith as Andy Nelson

== Development ==
The film was originally Charles Gary Allison's thesis as a film student at the University of Southern California. It is said to have been inspired by the 1959 hazing of Kappa Sigma pledge Richard Swanson, who died after attempting to swallow a large piece of raw liver without chewing.

Production began in the summer of 1975, with additional filming in December 1975 and January 1976. It was filmed at the University of Southern California in Los Angeles. Students were used as both cast and crew.

== Reception ==
Fraternity Row met with generally positive reviews, but the film saw very light business at the box office.

The film has not been released on DVD, although it was briefly available on VHS cassette in the early 1980s.
