= Scott Newman (actor) =

American actor (1950–1978)

- Born: Alan Scott Newman; September 23, 1950; Cleveland, Ohio, U.S.
- Died: November 20, 1978 (aged 28); Los Angeles, California, U.S.
- Cause of death: Drug overdose
- Occupations: Actor, stuntman
- Years active: 1973–1977
- Parent(s): Paul Newman; Jackie Witte
- Relatives: Nell Newman (half-sister); Melissa Newman (half-sister)

Alan Scott Newman (September 23, 1950 – November 20, 1978) was an American actor and stuntman whose most prominent roles were in The Towering Inferno and Breakheart Pass. He was the only son and the eldest child of actor Paul Newman. After Scott Newman's death from a drug overdose in 1978, his father established the Scott Newman Center, which is dedicated to preventing drug abuse through education.

== Early life and career ==
Newman was born Alan Scott Newman in Cleveland, Ohio, to Paul Newman and his first wife, Jackie Witte. When Scott was still a young boy with two younger sisters, Susan and Stephanie, his father moved to California to further his career, leaving his family in New York City. By 1958, his parents had divorced and his father had married Joanne Woodward. They settled in Westport, Connecticut, during the late 1960s, where Scott attended Staples High School briefly. Scott was expelled for bad behavior from some of the expensive private schools he attended.

By the late 1960s, Scott had dropped out of college and started to take jobs as a stuntman in his father's films, making over five hundred parachute jumps to become a certified instructor. He also took on menial jobs and refused to ask his father for financial help. In the early 1970s, his father used his influence to initiate an acting career for his son, and arranged a part for him in The Great Waldo Pepper (1975), starring Robert Redford. At the time, Scott stated, "I'm not taking any acting help from my father. I want my work to stand on its own merit." He had started to drink heavily, and was arrested for minor alcohol-related offenses. He also assaulted a police officer, kicking him in the head in a squad car after being arrested for vandalizing a school bus while drunk. Newman's father paid the resulting $1,000 fine.

Newman later played an acrophobic firefighter in The Towering Inferno (1974), in which his father co-starred. Newman also played small parts in TV series during 1975, such as Marcus Welby, M.D., Harry O., and S.W.A.T.. During the same year, he also appeared in the Charles Bronson film Breakheart Pass. Newman subsequently appeared in the 1977 film Fraternity Row, which was to be his last appearance. His alcoholism became more severe, and by 1978 he was sleeping on friends' floors and working as a laborer. He also tried his hand at cabaret singing in small clubs, billing himself as William Scott.

== Personal life ==
=== Relationship with father ===
Newman felt burdened by his father's fame, and sought to carve out a distinct identity. In a 1974 interview with New York Daily News columnist Sidney Fields, he said "Out there in Hollywood you can't stand on daddy's feet. You need your own." He told Fields that "as a kid I felt I was entitled to everything my father gave me," but that in recent years he had "made and paid my own way."

Scott confided to family friend A. E. Hotchner:

"It's hell being his son, you know. They expect you to be like him, or they try to get to him through me. All of f****** Hollywood seems to have screenplays they want me to give to him. Or for him to show up somewhere or another. I'm Paul Newman Jr, you know what I mean? But I don't have his blue eyes. I don't have his talent. I don't have his luck. I don't have anything . . . that's me. What do they want of me, Hotch? What do I want of me? All I have is the goddamn name."

In his posthumously published 2022 memoir, The Extraordinary Life of an Ordinary Man, Paul Newman agonized over his relationship with Scott in what the Wall Street Journal described as "anguished confusion." The actor said he never realized that Scott "might not want to be like me and ride in a race car or on a horse," and that "I never did think to say to him: 'Scott, would you like to go out on a horse? And it's no big deal if you don't want to do it.'"

=== Death ===
After a motorcycle accident in the fall of 1978, Newman was taking painkillers to ease the discomfort of his injuries. He also accepted an offer of psychiatric help, paid for by his father. However, in Los Angeles on the night of November 19, he took a fatal dose of valium with alcohol and other drugs. Police ruled the death as accidental. His father told Hotchner: "There's nothing you can say that will repair my guilt about Scott. It will be with me as long as I live."

== Scott Newman Center ==
In 1980, Paul Newman established the Scott Newman Center, dedicated to helping healthcare professionals and teachers educate children about the dangers of alcohol and drug abuse. The organization also founded the Rowdy Ridge Gang Camp, a network of summer camps for families dealing with problems associated with drug abuse and alcoholism.

== Filmography ==
Year	Title	Role	Notes
1974	The Towering Inferno	Young Fireman	
1975	The Great Waldo Pepper	Duke	
1975	Breakheart Pass	Rafferty	
1977	Fraternity Row	Chunk Cherry	
