= Wendy Phillips =

American actress

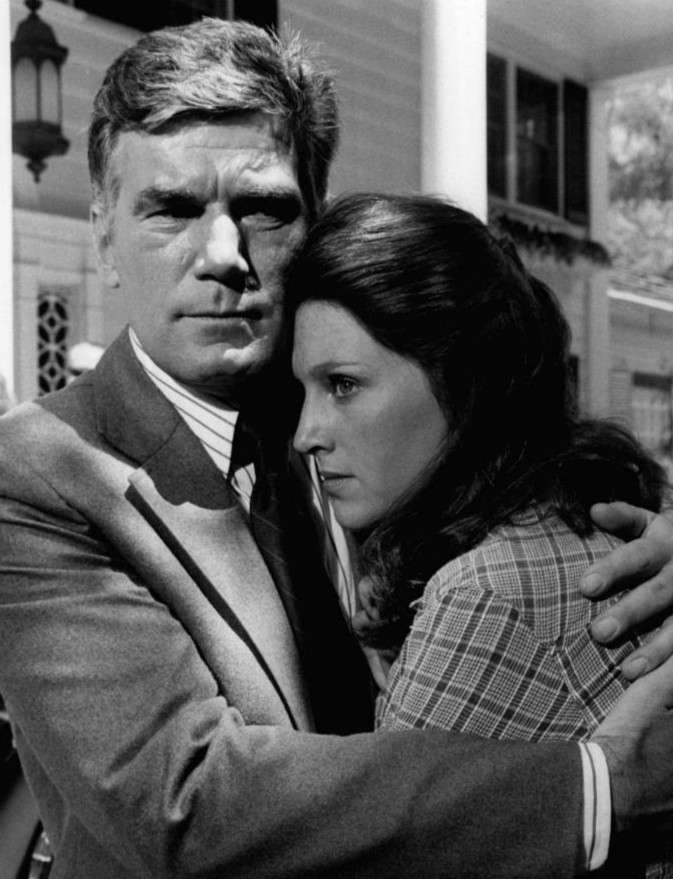
- Phillips and Mitchell Ryan in Executive Suite, 1976
- Born: January 2, 1952 (age 74); New York City, U.S.
- Occupation: Actress
- Years active: 1975–present
- Spouse: Scott Paulin (m. 1981)
- Children: 1

Wendy Phillips (born January 2, 1952) is an American actress, known for her roles on television series including Falcon Crest, Homefront and Promised Land.

== Early years ==
Phillips was born in Brooklyn, New York. Her father, Wendell K. Phillips, was an actor who performed primarily in theaters in New York. Her mother, Jean Shelton, was an actress. Her parents separated after her father was unable to obtain jobs because he was blacklisted for being a member of the Communist Party. Phillips lived with her grandmother in Atlanta for two years. Shelton and the couple's five children moved to Berkeley, California, after the separation. She worked as a legal secretary, and Phillips recalled, "At one point, she was on welfare and food stamps." Shelton also had a relationship with actor Robert Ross; Phillips said that neither he nor her father provided child support. The family's situation improved when Shelton began teaching acting classes, an effort that eventually developed into a school with 200 students. Phillips initially veered away from the family's acting tradition to study pre-law at the University of California at Berkeley. She found legal preparation less appealing than "great summations", however, so she went into acting as a profession.

== Career ==
Phillips made her screen debut in the 1975 NBC Movie of the Week, Death Be Not Proud. Two years later, Phillips made her big screen debut in the drama film Fraternity Row. On television, she starred alongside Mitchell Ryan in the CBS drama series, Executive Suite from 1976 to 1977, and later on the NBC series The Eddie Capra Mysteries (1978–79). She later guest-starred on Lou Grant, Trapper John, M.D., Taxi, St. Elsewhere, The Twilight Zone, and Murder, She Wrote

During the 1980s, Phillips appeared in films Airplane II: The Sequel (1982) and Midnight Run (1988), as well as a number of made-for-television movies, notably Paper Dolls (1982), the NBC miniseries A Year in the Life (1986), and its sequel series from 1987 to 1988. In 1989, she was a regular cast member in the ABC sitcom The Robert Guillaume Show, and from 1989 to 1990 starred as David Selby's character's last wife, Lauren Daniels, during the final season of CBS prime time soap opera, Falcon Crest. In 1991, she played title character's ex-wife in the biographical film Bugsy.

From 1991 to 1993, Phillips starred in the ABC award-winning drama series, Homefront. She later played Gerald McRaney's wife, Claire Greene, on the CBS series Touched by an Angel (1994–98) and Promised Land (1996–99). The following years, Phillips guest-starred on Charmed, ER, The Closer, Shameless, and had recurring roles on Studio 60 on the Sunset Strip (2006) and Big Love (2006–2011).

Phillips has been teaching scene study and acting for the camera privately since 2001, and in later years she has been an adjunct professor at the USC School of Cinematic Arts.

== Personal life ==
Phillips married actor Scott Paulin, and they have a daughter.

== Filmography ==
=== Film ===
Year	Title	Role	Notes
1977	Fraternity Row	Betty Ann	
1982	Airplane II: The Sequel	Mary	
1988	Midnight Run	Gail	
1988	From Hollywood to Deadwood	Monolith Secretary	
1989	The Wizard	Christine Bateman	
1991	Hard Time Romance		
1991	Bugsy	Esta Siegel	
2001	I Am Sam	Miss Wright	
2002	My Femme Lady	Mom	Short film
2004	Marty and Sven	Therapist	Short film
2006	Friends with Money	Fundraiser Host	
2007	Rendition	Samantha	
2009	Vocabular Delectations	Muse Martha	Short film

=== Television ===
Year	Title	Role	Notes
1975	Death Be Not Proud	Mary Wilson	TV movie
1975	One of Our Own	Debbie Hinshaw	TV movie
1976–1977	Executive Suite	Stacey Walling	18 episodes
1978–1979	The Eddie Capra Mysteries	Lacey Brown	10 episodes
1979	Paris	Dina Novotny	Episode: "Pawn"
1979	Lou Grant	Nell Wheeler	Episode: "Frame-Up"
1979	The Last Resort	Sandy	Episode: "Girlfriends"
1980	B. J. and the Bear	Officer Tracy McBain	Episode: "The 18-Wheel Rip-Off"
1980	The Love Tapes	Lisa Del Monte	TV movie
1981	CHiPs	Joanne	Episode: "The Killer Indy"
1982	Trapper John, M.D.	Laura Johnson	Episode: "42"
1982	Taxi	Heather	Episode: "The Road Not Taken: Part 1"
1982	Paper Dolls		TV movie
1984	Partners in Crime	Shirley Hamner	Episode: "The Hottest Guy in Town"
1984	Shattered Vows		TV movie
1984	St. Elsewhere	Diane Hassett	Episode: "Fade to White"
1984	The New Leave It to Beaver	Mrs. Roberts	Episode: "Thanksgiving Day"
1985	The Twilight Zone	Mom	Episode: "The Uncle Devil Show"
1986	Amazing Stories	Barbara Lynn	Episode: "The Sitter"
1986	Fuzzbucket	Mom	TV movie
1986	A Year in the Life	Anne Gardner-Maxwell	TV miniseries
1987	Matlock	Paula Campbell	Episode: "The Court-Martial: Part 1"; Episode: "The Court-Martial: Part 2"
1987	Murder, She Wrote	Nancy Dalton	Episode: "Murder, She Spoke"
1987	Baby Girl Scott		TV movie
1987–1988	A Year in the Life	Anne Gardner-Maxwell	22 episodes
1989	The Gifted One	Sarah Grant	TV movie
1989	The Robert Guillaume Show	Ann Sherr	12 episodes
1989–1990	Falcon Crest	Lauren Sharpe Daniels Channing	20 episodes
1990	Appearances	Marie Danzig	TV movie
1990	Lifestories	Mrs. Hawkins	Episode: "The Hawkins Family"
1991–1993	Homefront	Anne Metcalf	42 episodes
1994	MacShayne: Winner Takes All	Hannah Foss	TV movie
1994	MacShayne: The Final Roll of the Dice	Hannah Foss	TV movie
1994	The Stand	Lisa Hull	Episode: "The Plague"
1994	Diagnosis: Murder	Dr. Karen Fielder	Episode: "Murder Most Vial"
1994	Touched by an Angel	Ruth Ann Russell	Episode: "The Southbound Bus"
1995	The Commish	Emily Sherman	Episode: "The Johnny Club"
1995	Picket Fences	Janine Barrett	Episode: "The Song of Rome"
1995	Fast Company	Paula Stone	TV movie
1996	Heroine of Hell	Margaret	TV movie
1996	Savannah	Lucille Richards	9 episodes
1996	The Rockford Files: Friends and Foul Play	Babs Honeywell	TV movie
1996	A Season in Purgatory	Luanne Utley	TV movie
1996	ABC Afterschool Specials	Karen	Episode: "Too Soon for Jeff"
1996–1998	Touched by an Angel	Claire Greene	6 episodes
1996–1999	Promised Land	Claire Greene	67 episodes
2000	Family Law	Ruth Crowley	Episode: "Are You My Father?"
2000	The Beach Boys: An American Family		TV movie
2000	Strong Medicine	Michelle Freid	Episode: "Brainchild"
2001	Charmed	Sister Agnes	Episode: "Charmed Again: Part 2"
2002	For the People	Alice Benedict	Episode "Pilot"
2002	MDs	Mrs. Farrell	Episode: "Cruel and Unusual"
2003	Presidio Med	Louise Altman	Episode: "Breathless"
2003	Joan of Arcadia	Brenda Jameson	Episode: "Touch Move"
2003	ER	Mrs. Lambright	Episode: "Missing"
2004	Life on Liberty Street	Lucy Zane	TV movie
2005-2006	Ghost Whisperer	Diane Shields	2 Episodes: "Homecoming" + "The Vanishing"
2006	Studio 60 on the Sunset Strip	Shelley Green	4 episodes
2006–2011	Big Love	Peg Embry	15 episodes
2008	The Closer	Patricia Simmons	Episode: "Speed Bump"
2009	Bones	Abby Chevaleer	Episode: "The Goop on the Girl"
2018	SEAL Team	Linda Hayes	Episodes: "The Worst of Conditions", "All That Matters"
2020	The George Lucas Talk Show	Herself	Stu-D2 1138 on the Binary Sunset Sith (Studio 60 on the Sunset Strip marathon)
