= Nancy Morgan =

American actress (born 1949)

- Born: April 1, 1949 (age 77); Minneapolis, Minnesota, U.S.
- Occupation: Actress
- Years active: 1975–present
- Spouse: John Ritter (m. 1977; div. 1996)
- Children: 3, including Jason Ritter and Tyler Ritter

Nancy Karen Morgan (born April 1, 1949) is an American actress.

== Early life ==
Morgan is the daughter of Marjorie (née Greenfield) and Samuel A. Morgan. Jr. She is a niece of John "Red" Morgan, who received the Medal of Honor for his actions during World War II in 1943, events later fictionalized in the movie Twelve O'Clock High.

== Career ==
Morgan starred with Ron Howard in Howard's directorial debut Grand Theft Auto, and also appeared with Italian film star Terence Hill in a feature film and European television series based on comic-strip hero Lucky Luke. For many years Morgan and her husband John Ritter co-hosted the national United Cerebral Palsy Telethon together. They also co-starred in television movies The Dreamer of Oz and Heartbeat, and in the feature film Americathon. Morgan also made a guest appearance in Ritter's television series Hooperman.

== Personal life ==
Morgan married actor John Ritter in 1977, and they had three children, including Jason Ritter and Tyler Ritter. Ritter and Morgan divorced in 1996 after nineteen years of marriage.

== Filmography ==
=== Film ===
Year	Title	Role	Notes
1976	Fraternity Row	Jennifer	
1977	Grand Theft Auto	Paula Powers	
1978	Americathon	Lucy	
1980	Pray TV	Peggy Williams	
1988	The Nest	Lilli	
1988	Tricks of the Trade		
1988	Behind God's Back	Sara	
1991	Lucky Luke	Lotta Legs	
2008	Good Dick	Waitress	
2014	Boston	Jane	
2015	Worthy	Beverly Jenson	

=== Television ===
Year	Title	Role	Notes
1975	Lucas Tanner	Laurie, Student	2 episodes
1975	Medical Center		2 episodes
1976	McMillan and Wife	Jenny	Episode: "Greed"
1976	Shazam!	Kathy	Episode: "Out of Focus"
1977	Tattletales	Herself	1 episode
1977	The San Pedro Beach Bums	Julie	6 episodes
1978	Good Times	Cindy Crebbins	Episode: "Michael's Decision"
1978	Backstairs at the White House	Margaret Truman	1 episode
1982	Romance Theatre	Nancy	5 episodes
1982	Diff'rent Strokes	Kate	Episode: "The Older Woman"
1983	The Love Boat	Joanie Hoffman	2 episodes
1988	Hooperman	Nurse Daigler	Episode: "Who Do You Truss?"
1990	The Dreamer of Oz: The L. Frank Baum Story	Helen Leslie	Television film
1992	Lucky Luke	Lotta Legs	7 episodes
2015	Monday Night Shakespeare	Grandma Mountague	TV Mini-series
2018	Break a Hip	Yolanda Kincade	Episode: "Break a Hip"
2020	Life's a Bit	Mom	Television film
