= Fictitious Athlete Hall of Fame =

National convention and annual collection of fictional athletes

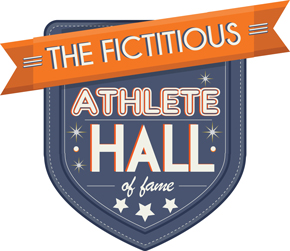
- Fictitious Athlete Hall of Fame logo
- Founder: Kirk Buchner
- Members: 27 characters 16 Athletes; 7 Contributors; 4 Veterans

The Fictitious Athlete Hall of Fame began in 2013, founded by Kirk Buchner.

There are two criteria for nomination to be inducted into the Fictitious Athlete Hall of Fame: the character must be a fictitious athlete or athletic supporting role appearing after 1970. In 2015 a "veterans" category was opened, which accepts nominees from before 1970.

Voting in the Fictitious Athlete Hall of Fame is public. There are three rounds of voting each year: one preliminary vote to narrow the field, a second vote to refine the nominees, and a final vote to determine the inductees.

== Inaugural induction ==
Rocky Balboa, from the Rocky film series, was chosen as the inaugural induction to start the Fictitious Athlete Hall of Fame. Buchner stated that the very inspiration for creating the page was seeing outrage at Sylvester Stallone being inducted into the International Boxing Hall of Fame for Rocky.

== 2014 inductions ==
In 2014, three fictional athletes and one contributor were selected.

The athletes were:

- Crash Davis; Bull Durham (played by Kevin Costner)
- Ricky "Wild Thing" Vaughn; Major League (played by Charlie Sheen)
- Roy Hobbs; The Natural (played by Robert Redford)

The contributor was:

- Harry Doyle; Major League (played by Bob Uecker)

== 2015 inductions ==
In 2015, the Veteran category was introduced to include those fictional characters who appeared in movies before 1970.

Five fictional athletes, two contributors, and one veteran were selected.

The athletes were:

- Happy Gilmore; Happy Gilmore (played by Adam Sandler)
- Reggie Dunlop; Slap Shot (played by Paul Newman)
- Hanson Brothers; Slap Shot (played by David Hanson, Steve Carlson, and Jeff Carlson)

The contributors were:

- Carl Spackler; Caddyshack (played by Bill Murray)
- Mr. Miyagi; The Karate Kid (played by Pat Morita)

The veteran was:

- Andy "Champ" Purcell; The Champ 1931 film (played by Wallace Beery)

== 2016 inductions ==
Three fictional athletes, two contributors, and one veteran were selected.

The athletes were:

- Apollo Creed; Rocky (played by Carl Weathers)
- Benjamin "Benny" Franklin Rodriguez; The Sandlot (played by Mike Vitar)
- Charlie Conway; The Mighty Ducks (played by Joshua Jackson)

The contributors were:

- Chubbs Peterson; Happy Gilmore (played by Carl Weathers)
- Gordon Bombay; The Mighty Ducks (played by Emilio Estevez)

The veteran was:

- Dennis Ryan; Take Me Out to the Ball Game (played by Frank Sinatra)

== 2017 inductions ==
Three fictional athletes, one contributor, and one veteran were selected.

The athletes were:

- Bobby Boucher; The Waterboy (played by Adam Sandler)
- Forrest Gump; Forrest Gump (played by Tom Hanks)
- Willie "Mays" Hayes; Major League (played by Wesley Snipes)

The contributor was:

- Mickey Goldmill; Rocky (played by Burgess Meredith)

The veteran was:

- Guffy McGovern; Angels in the Outfield (played by Paul Douglas)

== 2018 inductions ==
Three fictional athletes, one contributor, and one veteran were selected.

The athletes were:

- Daniel LaRusso; The Karate Kid (played by Ralph Macchio)
- Dottie Hinson; A League of Their Own (played by Geena Davis)
- Paul "Wrecking" Crewe; The Longest Yard (played by Burt Reynolds)

The contributor was:

- Morris Buttermaker; The Bad News Bears (played by Walter Matthau)

The veteran was:

- Huxley College; Horse Feathers (played by Groucho Marx, Harpo Marx, Chico Marx, and Zeppo Marx)

== 2019 inductions ==
Three fictional athletes, two contributors, and one veteran were selected.

The athletes were:

- Clubber Lang; Rocky (played by Mr. T)
- "Fast" Eddie Felson; The Hustler & The Color of Money (played by Paul Newman)
- Ivan Drago; Rocky (played by Dolph Lundgren)

The contributors were:

- "Coach" Ernie Pantusso; Cheers (played by Nicholas Colasanto)
- Adrian Balboa; Rocky (played by Talia Shire)

The veteran was:

- Goofy; various short and feature films

== 2020 inductions ==
Three fictional athletes, two contributors, and one veteran were selected.

The athletes were:

- Al Bundy; Married... with Children (played by Ed O'Neill)
- Homer Simpson; The Simpsons (voiced by Dan Castellaneta)
- Johnny Lawrence; The Karate Kid (played by William Zabka)

The contributors were:

- Jimmy Dugan; A League of their Own (played by Tom Hanks)
- The gopher; Caddyshack

The veteran was:

- Joe Hardy/Boyd; Damn Yankees

== 2021 inductions ==
Three fictional athletes, two contributors, and one veteran were selected.

The athletes were:

- Jake Taylor; Major League (played by Tom Berenger)
- Jimmy Chitwood; Hoosiers (played by Maris Valainis)
- Sam Malone; Cheers (played by Ted Danson)

The contributors were:

- Norman Dale; Hoosiers (played by Gene Hackman)
- Paulie Pennino; Rocky (played by Burt Young)

The veteran was:

- Harold Lamb; The Freshman (played by Harold Lloyd)

== 2022 inductions ==
Three fictional athletes, two contributors, and one veteran were selected.

The athletes were:

- Adonis Creed; Creed (played by Michael B. Jordan)
- Lee; Enter the Dragon (played by Bruce Lee)
- Ricky Bobby; Talladega Nights: The Ballad of Ricky Bobby (played by Will Ferrell)

The contributors were:

- Irving "Irv" Blitzer; Cool Runnings (played by John Candy)
- John Kreese; The Karate Kid (played by Martin Kove)

The veteran was:

- Frank Capua; Winning (played by Paul Newman)
