= Leonard Brumm =

American ice hockey player and coach (1926–2006)

Biographical details
- Born: 1926; Ironwood, Michigan
- Died: January 17, 2006 (aged 79–80); Racine, Wisconsin

Coaching career (HC unless noted)
- 1950–1951: Wyoming (hockey)
- 1952–1953: Alaska Fairbanks (basketball)

Administrative career (AD unless noted)
- 1951–1953: Alaska Fairbanks

Leonard Wilson "Oakie" Brumm Jr. (1926 – January 17, 2006) was an ice hockey player and coach. He played college hockey for the University of Michigan from 1947 to 1950 and was a member of the 1947–48 Michigan Wolverines men's ice hockey team that won the 1948 NCAA Division I Men's Ice Hockey Tournament, the first national collegiate hockey championship.

In the early 1950s, Brumm coached college hockey at the University of Wyoming and the University of Alaska Fairbanks. From 1953 to 1957, he was the athletic director of the Marquette Branch Prison in Michigan's Upper Peninsula where he organized an inmate hockey team that played an exhibition game against the Detroit Red Wings in 1954 and compiled a 35–15–8 record. He later served as a player-coach for the Marquette Sentinels, Des Moines Oak Leafs, Waterloo Blackhawks and Marquette Iron Rangers. In 1982, he co-founded the Kuwait National Hockey League, serving as a player-coach for the team that won three playoff titles in the new league.

== Early years ==
Brumm was born in Ironwood, Michigan in 1926 and raised in Marquette, Michigan, both cities located in Michigan's Upper Peninsula. His father, Leonard W. Brumm Sr., was a Wisconsin native who was employed as a civil engineer for the county in Marquette and later as a road and bridge contractor. In 1945, Brumm enlisted in the United States Army.

== University of Michigan ==
After his discharge from the Army, Brumm enrolled at the University of Michigan where he received a bachelor's degree in physical education in 1950. While attending the University of Michigan, Brumm played for both the tennis and men's ice hockey teams. He played hockey at Michigan for three years (1947-1950) and was a member of the 1947–48 Michigan Wolverines men's ice hockey team that won the 1948 NCAA Division I Men's Ice Hockey Tournament, the first national collegiate hockey championship. Brumm also played freshman football at Michigan in the fall of 1947.

== Career as coach and administrator ==
=== Wyoming and Alaska ===
After graduating from Michigan, Brumm coached hockey at the University of Wyoming during the 1950–51 season. He next accepted a job as the athletic director at the University of Alaska Fairbanks, a position he held from 1951 to 1953. He also served as the school's first basketball coach, compiling an 0–4 record during a four-game 1952–53 season. Brumm later recalled, "During the 1952–53 season I also arranged for the first ever basketball trip for the U of A to take to the 'Lower 48.' We lost all our games but we broke the ice."

=== Marquette Prison ===
From 1953 to 1957, Brumm was employed at the Marquette Branch Prison, a maximum-security prison in Marquette, Michigan. He was the prison's athletics and recreation director. Among his accomplishments at the prison was arranging an exhibition game in February 1954 between the Detroit Red Wings and a team of inmates at the prison. At the time, Brumm noted that Marquette was the "only penal institution in the nation with either an organized 'varsity' or a boarded regulation hockey rink." The prison hockey team organized by Brumm compiled a 35–15–8 record. Brumm later wrote a book, "We Only Played Home Games" about his time as the prison's athletic director.

Brumm also developed an 18-hole miniature golf course, shuffleboard courts, bocce court, and curling rink at the prison. In 1957, Brumm quit his job at the prison to work in the family's construction business, L.S. Brumm Construction Co.

=== Semi-pro hockey ===
Brumm also served as a player-coach with the Marquette Sentinels for seven years from 1954 to 1961, compiling a record of 96–77–14. He led the Sentinels to the Gibson Cup playoffs in 1956 and the Northern Michigan-Ontario League championship in 1957. In April 1961, he was hired as a player-coach by the Des Moines Oak Leafs in the United States Hockey League (USHL). He later also coached the Waterloo Blackhawks.

=== Marquette Iron Rangers ===
In 1964, Brumm was hired as the coach of the Marquette Iron Rangers a newly formed franchise in the USHL. Brumm remained the team's coach into the mid-1970s, for all but the final two years of the club's existence. In 1967, Brumm's Iron Rangers won the USHL playoffs. By the late 1960s, however, the Iron Rangers were "suffering aesthetically and financially" and "couldn't draw flies."

In October 1969, Brumm signed Karen Koch to a contract to play with the team. Billed as "the first professional female hockey player in America," the 18-year-old goalie said "she's not interested in boys, only hockey." Brumm said at the time that Koch had "a regular contract" with the team, though she would not be the team's starting goalie. The signing of Koch drew national attention and revived the fortunes of the team. By late December 1969, Koch had not been scored on and the team was in first place. When the Iron Rangers played in Green Bay, Wisconsin, "they had to call out the auxiliary police to handle the crowd." And, in Sault Ste. Marie, Ontario, "the mayor was part of a standing-room-only crowd and took the first practice shot" at Koch.

During the 1973–74 season with the Iron Rangers, Brumm was the first professional hockey coach of brothers Steve Carlson and Jeff Carlson. The Carlson Brothers later played the roles of two of the three Hanson Brothers in the 1977 motion picture, Slapshot. One of the plot lines from the film was also based on Brumm and the Iron Rangers. In the film, Paul Newman's character (an aging player-coach) offers a "bounty" of $100 for the first player to punch an opposing character named "Dr. Hook". While coaching the Iron Rangers, Brumm offered a bounty of $50 to any player who knocked down or fought Ernie DuPont of the Green Bay Bobcats. In 1968, Brumm acquired an ownership interest in the Marquette Mirror. He served as the newspaper's sports director and political columnist from 1968 to 1972.

=== Kuwait National Hockey League ===
In 1982, while working on a large construction project in Kuwait, Brumm co-founded the Kuwait National Hockey League. Upon arriving in Kuwait in 1982, Brumm discovered that Kuwait had a $10-million-dollar ice arena and "4,000 comfortably padded seats." He met a Swede, Mike Lundstrom, who had been hired by the Kuwaiti government to develop an Olympic ice hockey team. Brumm and Lundstrom decided to form the Kuwait National Hockey League. Brumm recalled:

"Before the evening was over, I had agreed to help [Lundstrom] organize the 'expat' players from other countries, and somehow we were determined to get an ice hockey league going in the middle of one of the hottest deserts in the world. Mike couldn't pay me much by Kuwaiti standards, but it certainly was an opportunity to spend a lot of time in the sixty-five-degree air of the rink, instead of the constant 100 degree-plus temperature outside."

From 1982 to 1987, he served as the publicity director for the Kuwaiti league and was a player-coach for a team that won three playoff titles in the new league. After a game between Brumm's team (made up mostly of Canadians) and a Kuwaiti team turned violent, a member of the Kuwait Sports Committee warned Brumm: "Mr. Brumm, I am here to inform you that any further violence on the part of your team members will leave us no choice but to deport the offending players and you, as their manager, from our country. You must get your gangsters under control immediately." The threat of deportation, and resulting loss of high-paying jobs in Kuwait, was sufficient motivation for Brumm's players to tone down the rough play. Brumm remained in Kuwait, and affiliated with the league, until he returned to the United States in the spring of 1987.

== Later years and death ==
Brumm was inducted into the Upper Peninsula Sports Hall of Fame in 1992.

During the 1990s, Brumm was the hockey coach at Brookfield Central High School and Brookfield East High School in Brookfield, Wisconsin. He was forced to resign in 1998 at age 71 and subsequently filed an age discrimination lawsuit against the Elmbrook Public School District.

In 2000, Brumm acquired The Wisconsin Hockey News, serving as the publication's owner and editor. He also became the rink manager at the Kenosha Ice Arena in 2004. Brumm died in 2006 of pancreatic and liver cancer in Racine, Wisconsin.
