= Slap Shot 2: Breaking the Ice =

- DVD cover
- Directed by: Steve Boyum
- Written by: Broderick Miller
- Based on: Characters by Nancy Dowd
- Produced by: Ron French
- Starring: Stephen Baldwin; Jessica Steen; Callum Keith Rennie; David Hemmings; David Paetkau; Jonathan Scarfe; Jeff Carlson; Steve Carlson; David Hanson; Gary Busey
- Cinematography: Joel Ransom
- Edited by: Craig Bassett
- Music by: John Frizzell
- Distributed by: Universal Studios Home Video
- Release date: March 26, 2002
- Running time: 104 minutes
- Country: United States
- Language: English

Slap Shot 2: Breaking the Ice is a 2002 American sports comedy film directed by Steve Boyum and starring Stephen Baldwin and Gary Busey. The direct-to-video film is the sequel to the 1977 film Slap Shot.

== Plot ==
25 years after the events of the first film, the Charlestown Chiefs are still languishing in Pennsylvania. Sean Linden, a former NHL player whose name has been disgraced for betting on games, has replaced Reggie Dunlop as the main protagonist — initially a player-coach, just like Dunlop, Linden also serves as the team's captain. The Chiefs struggle both on and off the ice, and violence remains their hallmark as Sean does not try to control the fighting trio of the Hanson Brothers.

Following another disappointing season, the team is sold to a family entertainment corporation called Better America, run by an executive named Richmond Claremont. The Chiefs are then moved to Nebraska and renamed the "Super Chiefs," and are also given a new female coach. Sean and the rest of the players soon discover that Claremont intends to use the Super Chiefs as a team which purposefully loses in choreographed and scripted games against a Harlem Globetrotters-type team called the Omaha IceBreakers, in an attempt by Claremont to make the game suitable for a family audience.

During their first rehearsal, a fight breaks out between the Super Chiefs and the IceBreakers, which results in the Hanson Brothers getting fired. After the fight, Claremont bribes a financially struggling Sean to change the team's attitude about losing games on purpose, and then he can leave on his own terms. Sean manages to convince everyone into supporting "fake games" for higher pay and better exposure, and he prepares to leave Nebraska after faking a shoulder injury. While at the airport, he watches a panel discussion on TV about how he and Claremont are an embarrassment to the game of hockey. Realizing his love for the game, Sean returns to the team, along with the Hanson Brothers, to play a real game against the IceBreakers as the Chiefs.

Finally back to their old ways, the Chiefs use their physical brutality and beat the IceBreakers on a last-second goal by Sean. A furious Claremont threatens to sue, but he learns the team was sold under his nose to the Hanson Brothers, who recently won the lottery. The movie ends with the Hanson Brothers announcing the team is returning to Charlestown and going back to their roots of playing "old-time hockey."

== Cast ==
- Stephen Baldwin as Sean Linden
- Gary Busey as Richmond Claremont
- Jessica Steen as Jessie Dage
- David Paetkau as Gordie Miller
- Jonathan Scarfe as Skipper Day
- Steve Carlson as Steve Hanson
- Jeff Carlson as Jeff Hanson
- David James Lewis as Rick Cooper
- Tony Vlastelic as Dvotcha
- Dave Babych as Wolfhard
- David Hemmings as Martin Fox
- Callum Keith Rennie as Palmberg
- Jody Racicot as Gasmer
- David Hanson as Jack Hanson
- Andrew Mcllroy as Dexter Howell
- Pete Graham as Schenkman
- Raoul Ganeev as Janecek
- John Ulmer as Cariboo

== Reception ==
Rotten Tomatoes gives Slap Shot 2: Breaking the Ice a score of 0% based on 5 reviews.

== See also ==
- List of films about ice hockey
