= Minnesota Fighting Saints =

Former ice hockey team of the World Hockey Association

- City: Saint Paul, Minnesota
- League: World Hockey Association
- Operated: 1972–1976 (First franchise); 1976–1977 (Second franchise)
- Home arena: St. Paul Auditorium (1972); St. Paul Civic Center (1973–77)
- Colors: Royal blue, new gold and white (1972–76); Scarlet, old gold and white (1976–77)
- Media: WTCN-TV; WLOL

Franchise history
- First franchise
- 1972–1976 (folded mid-season): Minnesota Fighting Saints
- Second franchise
- 1972 (did not play): Calgary Broncos
- 1972–1976: Cleveland Crusaders
- 1976–1977 (folded mid-season): Minnesota Fighting Saints

The Minnesota Fighting Saints was the name of two professional ice hockey teams based in Saint Paul, Minnesota, that played in the World Hockey Association. The first team was one of the WHA's original twelve franchises, playing from 1972 to 1976. The second team was relocated from Cleveland, Ohio, and played for part of the 1976–77 season. Neither edition of the franchise completed its final season of play.

== Original team ==
The team was founded in November 1971. Originally to be named the St. Paul Fighting Saints, the team soon went with "Minnesota Fighting Saints". The first Fighting Saints team played four seasons beginning in 1972–73 under the ownership of nine local businessmen. St. Paul attorney Wayne Belisle purchased the team late in the 1973–74 season. Belisle was the front man for a group of owners that included Jock Irvine. The Saints' first game, a 4–3 loss to the Winnipeg Jets, was played October 13, 1972, at the St. Paul Auditorium. The team moved to the new St. Paul Civic Center, which opened in January 1973. The first game in the new arena was on January 1, 1973, a 4–4 overtime tie with the Houston Aeros.

The team colors were royal blue, white and new gold. The name was taken from the St. Paul Saints of the Central Hockey League, who had used the nickname "Fighting Saints" in promotional material.

The team originally had three sets of jerseys—white, blue and gold—all bearing the Saints "S" logo on the front, with the word "Saints" across the middle of the "S." (The gold jerseys were rarely used, and were worn only in the first season.) When the Saints left the St. Paul Auditorium for the new Civic Center on January 1, 1973, the familiar "little saint" logo replaced the "S" on the white and blue jerseys. While a halo was part of the team's "little saint" logo in promotions and advertising, it was never used on the jersey.

At the outset, the Saints had a policy of favoring local players, with the 1972–73 roster featuring no fewer than 11 athletes who were either born in Minnesota or were at least American citizens (as in the case of former Team USA players Keith Christiansen, George Konik and Carl Wetzel). This was almost unheard of in the early 1970s, when few NHL or WHA teams had even a single American player. In fact, one of the players the Saints selected in the inaugural WHA draft in 1972 was Wendell Anderson, a former star defenseman at the University of Minnesota and a member of the silver medal-winning Team USA squad at the 1956 Winter Olympics. Anderson said he was flattered, but he chose not to join the Saints and instead stuck to his day job—as Governor of Minnesota.

The Saints never missed the playoffs nor had a losing record. Perhaps even more impressively, given that they were in direct competition with the Minnesota North Stars of the established National Hockey League, the Fighting Saints always drew more fans than the WHA average. (Note: The Saints drew an average of 7,288 over four seasons, with the WHA average at 6,617.) On a few occasions, the Fighting Saints drew more fans than their local NHL rivals. They also boasted a handful of expensive marquee players such as Mike Walton, Dave Keon and John McKenzie. Eventually, it was the team's high payroll that largely contributed to its demise. Without a marketable star in Gordie Howe or Bobby Hull's mold, the Saints were unable to secure a lucrative television deal. As a result, even above-WHA average gate receipts were not enough to overcome the team's financial woes.

In 1975–76, the Saints had a record of 30–25–4 and were second in the West behind the Houston Aeros when they ceased operations because of financial struggles. Saints officials announced on December 31, 1975, that the team was broke, and the players would continue to play without pay. (Belisle's group withdrew its backing at the start of the season.) A permanent buyer was never found, and the players received one paycheck in the final two months.

The Fighting Saints' last game was played February 25, 1976, at the Civic Center, a 2–1 overtime loss to the San Diego Mariners in front of an announced crowd of 6,011. The decision to fold the franchise occurred February 28, 1976, in the lobby of the Minneapolis–Saint Paul International Airport, moments before the team was scheduled to board a flight to Cincinnati for a game that night.

== Second team ==
The second incarnation's logo (identical to the first, only with the original blue changed to red), from the 1976–77 season.

After the NHL's California Golden Seals moved to Cleveland to become the Cleveland Barons, the WHA's Cleveland Crusaders moved to St. Paul for the 1976–77 season. Mileti stated to the press on the move to Minnesota that the team was financially stable while planning to build a first-rate organization and also considering letting local supporters invest in the team. Like their predecessors, this second version of the Saints (called the "New Fighting Saints" in advertising and promotional material) had a winning record through their first 42 games (19–18–5), but owner Nick Mileti was unable to sell the team to local buyers. (Also, the new Saints weren't drawing as well as the old ones: just 6,211 a night, versus the league average of 7,675.)

The "New" Fighting Saints played their final game on January 14, 1977, a 9–5 home win over the Indianapolis Racers. The franchise officially folded on January 20, 1977. The team's logo and uniforms were identical to the previous incarnation but with scarlet replacing royal blue.

== Players ==
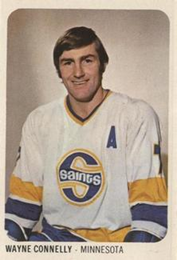
1974-75 card of Wayne Connelly for Minnesota

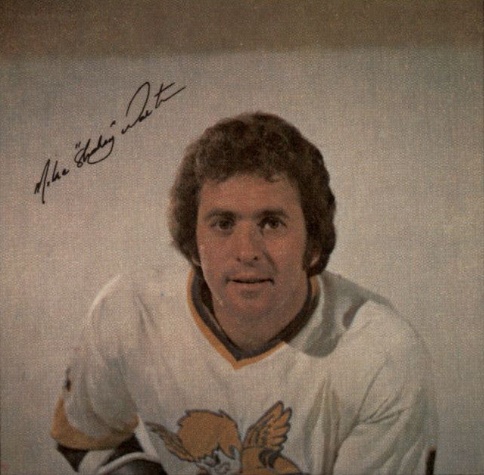
1974-75 card of Mike Walton for Minnesota

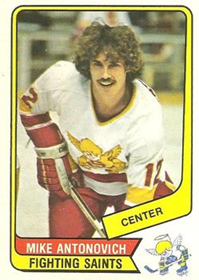
Mike Antonovich card from the short-lived second incarnation of the Saints in 1976

Ted Hampson was the Saints' captain in their first four seasons. In the final season, Ron Ward was the team captain, replaced on December 28, 1976, by John Arbour.

Among the Saints' notable players were Wayne Connelly (the team's career scoring leader with 283 points in 291 games), Mike Walton, Mike Antonovich (the team's career games leader with 309), Hockey Hall of Famer Dave Keon, John McKenzie and Rick Smith, and goalies Mike Curran and John Garrett. Also on the Minnesota roster were Jeff Carlson, Steve Carlson, and David Hanson, who played the infamous Hanson Brothers in the 1977 cult movie Slap Shot. (The trio weren't the Saints' only connection to the film: in the 1974 WHA semifinals against Houston, controversial forward Bill "Goldie" Goldthorpe played three games for the Fighting Saints, compiling no points and 25 penalty minutes; Slap Shot featured a wild player named Ogie Oglethorpe, based on Goldthorpe.) Veteran NHL coach Bruce Boudreau made his professional debut with the Saints, playing 30 games in the 1975–76 season and scoring three goals and six assists.

The last active Fighting Saints player in major professional hockey was Jack Carlson, who retired after the 1986–87 NHL season with the North Stars (Carlson was also invited to be in Slap Shot, but had to decline as his team was in the playoffs, so his role was recast). The last Saint regularly playing in pro hockey was Bruce Boudreau, who played in the American Hockey League until 1992. (In 1996, Mike Antonovich came out of retirement as a player-coach, playing a few games in the United Hockey League.)

== Executives and staff ==
Glen Sonmor was the Saints general manager throughout their history. Sonmor coached the Saints for the first part of their inaugural season. When Sonmor gave up his coaching duties, assistant coach Harry Neale took over as head coach (his first game was February 17, 1973). Sonmor coached the Saints again during their final season, 1976–77. Neale became head coach of the New England Whalers after the original Saints folded in 1976, and later coached the Vancouver Canucks in the National Hockey League.

The Saints' public address announcers included Al Tighe (1973–74) and Rod Trongard (1974–1977). Team organists included Rob Meads (1973–1976) and Ronnie Newman (1976–77). Jim Bowers often sang the National Anthem. George Nagobads was the team's physician from 1973 to 1976.

== Season-by-season record ==
Note: GP = Games played, W = Wins, L = Losses, T = Ties, Pts = Points, GF = Goals for, GA = Goals against, PIM = Penalties in minutes

Season	GP	W	L	T	Pts	GF	GA	PIM	Finish	Playoffs
1972–73	78	38	37	3	79	250	269	1134	4th, Western	Lost Quarterfinals (Jets)
1973–74	78	44	32	2	90	332	275	1243	2nd, Western	Won Quarterfinals (Oilers); Lost Semifinals (Aeros)
1974–75	78	42	33	3	87	308	279	1233	3rd, Western	Won Quarterfinals (Whalers); Lost Semifinals (Nordiques)
1975–76	59	30	25	4	64	211	212	1354	DNF	Did not finish season
Totals	293	154	127	12	320	1101	1035	4964
1976–77	42	19	18	5	43	136	129	600	DNF	Did not finish season
Totals	42	19	18	5	43	136	129	600

== Media coverage ==
Games of the original Fighting Saints were heard on WLOL Radio (1330 AM) from 1972 to 1976, with Frank Buetel as play-by-play announcer. Buetel was the original TV voice of the NHL's Minnesota North Stars from 1967 to 1970 on WTCN-TV (now KARE-TV). Buetel's color commentators included Roger Buxton (1972–73) and Bob Halvorson, the Saints' first-season public relations director (1972–73), and Bill Allard (1973–1976). Al Hirt's version of "When the Saints Go Marching In" was used as the theme song for WLOL's Fighting Saints broadcasts. No local radio station carried games of the New Fighting Saints (1976–77).

Fighting Saints games were televised sporadically on WTCN from 1973 to 1975. The first WTCN game was a home contest versus Cleveland on December 23, 1973, with Buetel and Allard simulcasting. Buxton called subsequent games on WTCN.

On January 7, 1973, CBS aired its first WHA game between the Fighting Saints and Winnipeg Jets live from the new St. Paul Civic Center with Ron Oakes, Gerry Cheevers and Dick Stockton announcing. In the 1973–74 season, one Saints home game was carried on KTCA-TV (PBS). No local TV station aired games of the New Fighting Saints.

The main sponsors of the Fighting Saints on radio and TV were Schmidt Beer and Midwest Federal.

Sportswriters who covered the Fighting Saints were Charley Hallman of the St. Paul Pioneer Press-Dispatch, John Gilbert of the Minneapolis Tribune, and Dan Stoneking of the Minneapolis Star.
