= Blake Ball =

Canadian ice hockey player (1938–2006)

- Born: February 25, 1938 St. Thomas, Ontario, Canada
- Died: January 20, 2006 (aged 67)
- Height: 6 ft 4 in (193 cm)
- Weight: 225 lb (102 kg; 16 st 1 lb)
- Position: Defence
- Shot: Left
- Played for: Cleveland Crusaders
- Playing career: 1964–1977

Blake Ball (February 25, 1938 – January 20, 2006) was an ice hockey defenceman who played thirteen years of minor league hockey. Ball spent the majority of his career in the Eastern Hockey League. He played his only professional hockey games with the Cleveland Crusaders of the World Hockey Association, playing two games in the 1973 WHA playoffs.

== Playing career ==
=== Football ===
Ball spent six years in the Canadian Football League as a defensive end.

Ball was nicknamed "Badman" because of the time spent in the penalty box as a member of the New Haven Blades (1964-1969). He had four consecutive seasons of at least 300 penalty minutes, including a career high 362 PIMs in 1968-69. During the 1968-69 season, Ball also recorded a career high in assists (42) and points (55).

Ball played the 1970 season with the Long Island Ducks. He played the 1971 season with the Johnstown Jets. On 13 September 1971 he was named player-coach for the Jacksonville Rockets. Despite his holding a position as player-coach, Ball and goaltender Ted Ouimet were dealt to the Syracuse Blazers on December 15, 1971.

Ball was suspended for two games, effective March 13, 1973, after a brawl in a Blazers-Rhode Island Eagles game.

== Acting career ==
Ball had a minor role in the movie Slap Shot. He played defenceman Gilmore Tuttle, who was from Mile 40, Saskatchewan, and was running a donut shop after his retirement from hockey. According to public address announcer Jim Carr, Tuttle was the "former penalty-minute record holder for the years 1960 to 1968 inclusive" and wore uniform number 15.

"We'll straighten you out, you little prick".

— Gilmore Tuttle, a character played by Blake Ball in the movie Slap Shot

== Personal life ==
Prior to becoming a professional hockey player, Ball had served as a police officer in Toronto. Ball had also worked as a masked professional wrestler in the Toronto area. "I wasn't supposed to do it," said Ball, "but like those (teammates) who wrestled in Macon, I wore a mask, so no one could tell who I was." Ball also admitted that he wrestled under different aliases.

After his retirement from hockey, Ball worked for a construction company in Grand Junction, Colorado operating heavy equipment such as bulldozers.

Ball died January 20, 2006, in Kitchener from natural causes, brought on from dementia and Alzheimer's disease. He was 67 years old. He predeceased his parents, Jessie and Blake Ball, who also died that year. He is survived by his children.

== Career statistics ==
=== Regular season and playoffs ===
			Regular season					Playoffs
Season	Team	League	GP	G	A	Pts	PIM	GP	G	A	Pts	PIM
1954–55	Barrie Flyers	OHA	13	0	0	0	0	—	—	—	—	—
1955–56	Barrie Flyers	OHA	25	1	1	2	0	—	—	—	—	—
1956–57	Barrie Flyers	OHA	24	1	3	4	0	—	—	—	—	—
1957–58	Lakeshore Bruins	MJBHL	Statistics Unavailable
1964–65	Port Huron Flags	IHL	11	0	3	3	31	—	—	—	—	—
1965–66	New Haven Blades	EHL	69	4	17	21	304	3	0	1	1	16
1966–67	New Haven Blades	EHL	64	6	37	43	290	—	—	—	—	—
1967–68	New Haven Blades	EHL	72	6	34	40	319	10	3	6	9	17
1968–69	New Haven Blades	EHL	72	12	42	54	362	10	0	7	7	31
1969–70	Long Island Ducks	EHL	74	18	30	48	308	—	—	—	—	—
1970–71	Johnstown Jets	EHL	71	4	36	40	312	10	2	7	9	50
1971–72	Jacksonville Rockets	EHL	28	0	9	9	136	—	—	—	—	—
1971–72	Syracuse Blazers	EHL	42	2	11	13	151	17	1	4	5	54
1972–73	Orillia Terriers	OHASr	22	1	3	4	77	—	—	—	—	—
1972–73	Syracuse Blazers	EHL	39	2	26	28	110	12	1	6	7	51
1972–73	Cleveland Crusaders	WHA	—	—	—	—	—	2	0	0	0	2
1973–74	Columbus Owls	IHL	50	2	21	23	209	6	0	3	3	17
1973–74	Macon Whoopees	SHL	15	2	0	2	69	—	—	—	—	—
1974–75	Syracuse Eagles	AHL	32	0	7	7	86	—	—	—	—	—
1975–76	Syracuse Blazers	NAHL	28	1	3	4	40	6	0	1	1	26
1976–77	Oklahoma City Blazers	CHL	59	1	10	11	116	—	—	—	—	—
1976–77	Barrie Flyers	OHASr	5	0	0	0	11	—	—	—	—	—
WHA totals			—	—	—	—	—	2	0	0	0	0
