= Goldie Goldthorpe =

Canadian ice hockey player

- Born: June 20, 1953 (age 72) Hornepayne, Ontario, Canada
- Height: 5 ft 11 in (180 cm)
- Weight: 185 lb (84 kg; 13 st 3 lb)
- Position: Left wing
- Shot: Left
- Played for: Syracuse Blazers; Minnesota Fighting Saints; Broome Dusters; Michigan Stags/Baltimore Blades; Denver Spurs/Ottawa Civics; San Diego Mariners
- WHA draft: Undrafted
- Playing career: 1973–1984

Bill "Goldie" (also "Harpo") Goldthorpe (born June 20, 1953) is a Canadian retired professional ice hockey player. He is best known as the inspiration for Ogie Ogilthorpe in the 1977 film Slap Shot. Goldthorpe, a left winger, was a notorious hockey enforcer, a man once dubbed the "wildest, meanest, most unpredictable player in hockey." In his checkered eight-year career (1973–1980, 1983–1984), Goldthorpe played for ten minor league teams and four World Hockey Association squads; along the way, he racked up 1,132 penalty minutes in just 194 professional games.

== Career ==
Born in Hornepayne, Ontario, Goldthorpe played his minor hockey in Thunder Bay, Ontario. His father was an engineer for the Canadian National Railway and his mother was a nurse's aide. At their wedding, Leo Boivin (now in the Hockey Hall of Fame) served as the best man.

Goldthorpe played junior hockey with the Port Arthur Marrs, Thunder Bay Vulcans and Thunder Bay Centennials from 1969 to 1973. Goldthorpe first met his junior coach, Albert Cava, at a midget tournament in Dauphin, Manitoba when Cava was wrestling with a referee who had slugged a spectator. In his last season with the Centennials, he led the league with 189 penalty minutes.

Goldthorpe was signed by the minor-league Syracuse Blazers in 1973. He played 55 games that season, scoring a respectable 20 goals and a total of 46 points while piling up 285 penalty minutes. He played for the Blazers in the playoffs and was also called up to the WHA's Minnesota Fighting Saints for three playoff games. During his professional career, Goldthorpe would play for numerous teams in the minors, and a total of 36 games in the World Hockey Association. He was generally only used as an enforcer, but occasionally showed he had some skill as well; with the San Diego Hawks, Goldthorpe scored 13 goals and 28 points in 39 games (and led the league with 267 penalty minutes). He was given tryouts by both the Toronto Maple Leafs and Pittsburgh Penguins and appeared in exhibition contests, but never played a regular-season NHL game.

In 1980, Goldthorpe was shot by a drug dealer while trying to intervene on behalf of an ex-girlfriend. His kidney and urinary tract were damaged, derailing his career; he spent the next two years recovering. Goldthorpe returned to professional hockey in 1983 with the Moncton Alpines for one game, then finished the season playing senior hockey in New Brunswick with the Riverview Trappers. It was his last season of competitive ice hockey.

His father, who had helped Goldthorpe recuperate from the shooting, died not long after. His death changed Goldthorpe, who then returned to school. His hockey career was over, but he stayed in shape and became a bodybuilder, winning the 1985 "Mr. New Brunswick" competition. Later, Goldthorpe returned to San Diego, eventually becoming foreman at a construction company. As of 2017, he was living in Vancouver, British Columbia, working for the same firm. Goldthorpe also does speaking engagements.

== Career statistics ==
			Regular season					Playoffs
Season	Team	League	GP	G	A	Pts	PIM	GP	G	A	Pts	PIM
1971–72	Thunder Bay Vulcans	MNTBHL	Statistics Unavailable					Statistics Unavailable
1973–74	Syracuse Blazers	NAHL	55	20	26	46	285	15	5	8	13	50
1973–74	Minnesota Fighting Saints	WHA	-	-	-	-	-	3	0	0	0	25
1974–75	Syracuse Eagles	AHL	9	0	1	1	57	-	-	-	-	-
1974–75	Syracuse Blazers	NAHL	2	0	0	0	0	-	-	-	-	-
1974–75	Michigan Stags/Baltimore Blades	WHA	7	0	0	0	26	-	-	-	-	-
1975–76	San Diego Mariners	WHA	14	1	0	1	30	-	-	-	-	-
1975–76	Denver Spurs/Ottawa Civics	WHA	12	0	0	0	31	-	-	-	-	-
1975–76	Erie Blades	NAHL	1	0	0	0	22	-	-	-	-	-
1975–76	Broome Dusters	NAHL	19	9	8	17	156	-	-	-	-	-
1976–77	Thunder Bay Twins	OHASr	4	2	1	3	69	-	-	-	-	-
1976–77	Richmond Wildcats	SHL	25	6	12	18	169	-	-	-	-	-
1977–78	New Haven Nighthawks	AHL	4	0	0	0	9	-	-	-	-	-
1977–78	Toledo Goaldiggers	IHL	2	0	0	0	9	-	-	-	-	-
1978–79	San Diego Hawks	PHL	39	13	15	28	267	-	-	-	-	-
1979–80	Spokane Flyers	WIHL	Statistics Unavailable					Statistics Unavailable
1983–84	Moncton Alpines	AHL	1	0	0	0	2	-	-	-	-	-
WHA Total			33	1	0	1	87	3	0	0	0	25
AHL Total			14	0	1	1	68	-	-	-	-	-
NAHL Total			77	29	34	63	463	15	5	8	13	50
SHL Total			25	6	12	18	169	-	-	-	-	-
OHASr Total			4	2	1	3	69	-	-	-	-	-
IHL Total			2	0	0	0	9	-	-	-	-	-
PHL Total			39	13	15	28	267	-	-	-	-	-
WIHL Total			Statistics Unavailable					Statistics Unavailable
MNTBHL Total			Statistics Unavailable					Statistics Unavailable

== Slap Shot ==
The comedy movie Slap Shot was made while Goldthorpe was still an active player. According to Ned Dowd, brother of "Slap Shot" writer Nancy Dowd (and a hockey player in his own right), the "Ogie" Ogilthorpe character incorporated elements of Goldthorpe (especially his wild demeanor and frizzy, Harpo Marx-like haircut), but was not actually him. Goldthorpe has said that the producers were thinking about putting him in the film, but he was not offered a role after he was charged with assault and broke a bottle in the dressing room when Paul Newman's brother visited. (Dowd himself wound up playing Ogilthorpe.)

Goldthorpe was well known for never backing down from any challenge, on or off the ice. He ended up in jail no less than eighteen times, incidents he now attributes mostly to his drinking. Like the fictional "Ogie", Goldthorpe once was serving a jail sentence but was allowed out for practices and games.

On January 1, 2008, during the first intermission of the NHL's Winter Classic outdoor game in Buffalo, NBC showed a short piece on the movie Slap Shot and Goldthorpe's connection to Bob Costas: Costas did radio play-by-play for the 1973-74 Syracuse Blazers, Goldie's team at the time.

In the 2013 TV movie Mr. Hockey: The Gordie Howe Story, actor Bryan Clark (a former player who had appeared in the hockey comedy Goon) plays a character obviously inspired by Goldthorpe. (In Goldie's usual subtle style, the player threatens to "bury (Gordie's) entire family in the desert!" before referees drag him away.)
