= The Anome =

1973 science fiction novel by Jack Vance

- First edition
- Author: Jack Vance
- Language: English
- Series: Durdane series
- Genre: Science fiction
- Publisher: Dell Publishing
- Publication date: 1973
- Publication place: United States
- Media type: Print (Paperback)
- Pages: 224
- ISBN: 0-440-00441-1
- OCLC: 62876242
- Followed by: The Brave Free Men

The Anome (alternative title: The Faceless Man) is a science fiction novel by American writer Jack Vance, first published in 1973 (copyright 1971); it is the first book in the Durdane series of novels.

== Plot summary ==
The Anome follows a young boy as he comes of age in the land of Shant, a fragmented society composed of diverse and often eccentric cantons – some ruled by cults. Every adult in Shant is required to wear an explosive collar or torc, which can be remotely detonated, causing instant death by decapitation. These torcs are controlled by a mysterious and anonymous ruler known only as the Anome. Although the Anome has absolute power over life and death, actual enforcement is largely delegated to local canton leaders, who decide who should be executed for breaking their laws. The Anome is able to govern with only a few aides, called 'Benevolences', none of whom know the ruler's true identity.

== See also ==
- Wedlock, a 1991 film featuring explosive collars.
