= Durdane series =

Novel trilogy by Jack Vance

The Durdane series is a trilogy of science fiction novels written by Jack Vance between 1971 and 1973, and detail the adventures of Gastel Etzwane on the world Durdane. The trilogy, as a whole, portrays his rise from common boy to the autocrat the Anome, and finally, as a saviour of his world against the alien Asutra of the third book. The trilogy is set in the same broad Gaean Reach milieu as many of Vance's other works.

The three books are, in reading and publication order:

- The Anome
- The Brave Free Men
- The Asutra

== Plot summary ==
The land of Shant on the planet Durdane is ruled by a purposely anonymous dictator called the Anome or Faceless Man. He maintains control by virtue of the torc, a ring of explosive placed around the neck of every adult in Shant which he can detonate.

When one Anome grows old, he chooses his successor under a system hundreds of years old. The reason for this harsh system of government is the extreme individuality of the folk of Shant. They are divided into dozens of different cantons, each with very distinctive customs and laws, united only by a common language. Prior to the ascendancy of the Faceless Man, Shant was plagued by constant civil war and dissension. The Faceless Man not only provides the glue that holds Shant together but also communicates anonymously with the cantonal leaders. Those who lose their heads are largely those who have violated local law.

The protagonist of the trilogy is Gastel Etzwane, the son of a prostitute and an anonymous musician. The first two volumes chronicle his coming of age, his discovery of the identity of his father, his struggles to become a musician himself, the murder of his mother and sister by a race of alien barbarian invaders known as the Roguskhoi, and his struggle for revenge against them. This leads to Etzwane's discovering the identity of the Anome, who, strangely passive, refuses to mobilize the armies of Shant against the aliens. Etzwane is forced to assume the role of Anome himself and, through luck and improvisation, leads an eventually successful struggle against the invaders. In response to the social upheaval caused by the war, Etzwane lays down his office, and the torc system is abolished.

In the third and final volume, Etzwane learns that the invaders are the creation of an alien race known as the Asutra, who designed them in a first attempt at biological warfare against humanity, using Durdane as a test-bed. The Roguskhoi are all male, can only reproduce with human women, and they are insanely lustful. The resulting "imps" have no genetic relationship to the human mother.

== Publication history ==
The Durdane trilogy was originally published in The Magazine of Fantasy and Science Fiction, in six parts, two per novel, between February 1971 and June 1973:

- "The Faceless Man" (part one of two), The Magazine of Fantasy and Science Fiction, February 1971
- "The Faceless Man" (part two of two), The Magazine of Fantasy and Science Fiction, March 1971
- "The Brave Free Men" (part one of two), The Magazine of Fantasy and Science Fiction, July 1972
- "The Brave Free Men" (part two of two), The Magazine of Fantasy and Science Fiction, August 1972
- "The Asutra" (part one of two), The Magazine of Fantasy and Science Fiction, May 1973
- "The Asutra" (part two of two), The Magazine of Fantasy and Science Fiction, June 1973

The trilogy was first published in book form in the U.S. by Dell, with the title of the first part changed to The Anome: The Anome (1973), The Brave Free Men (1973), The Asutra (1974). The first U.K. publication was by Coronet: The Anome (1975), The Brave Free Men (1975), The Asutra (1975). The Coronet edition is notable for its cover artwork, by Jim Burns: when placed side by side the three covers form one continuous painting.

== See also ==
- Wedlock, a 1991 film featuring explosive collars.
