= David Hanson (ice hockey) =

American ice hockey player (born 1954)

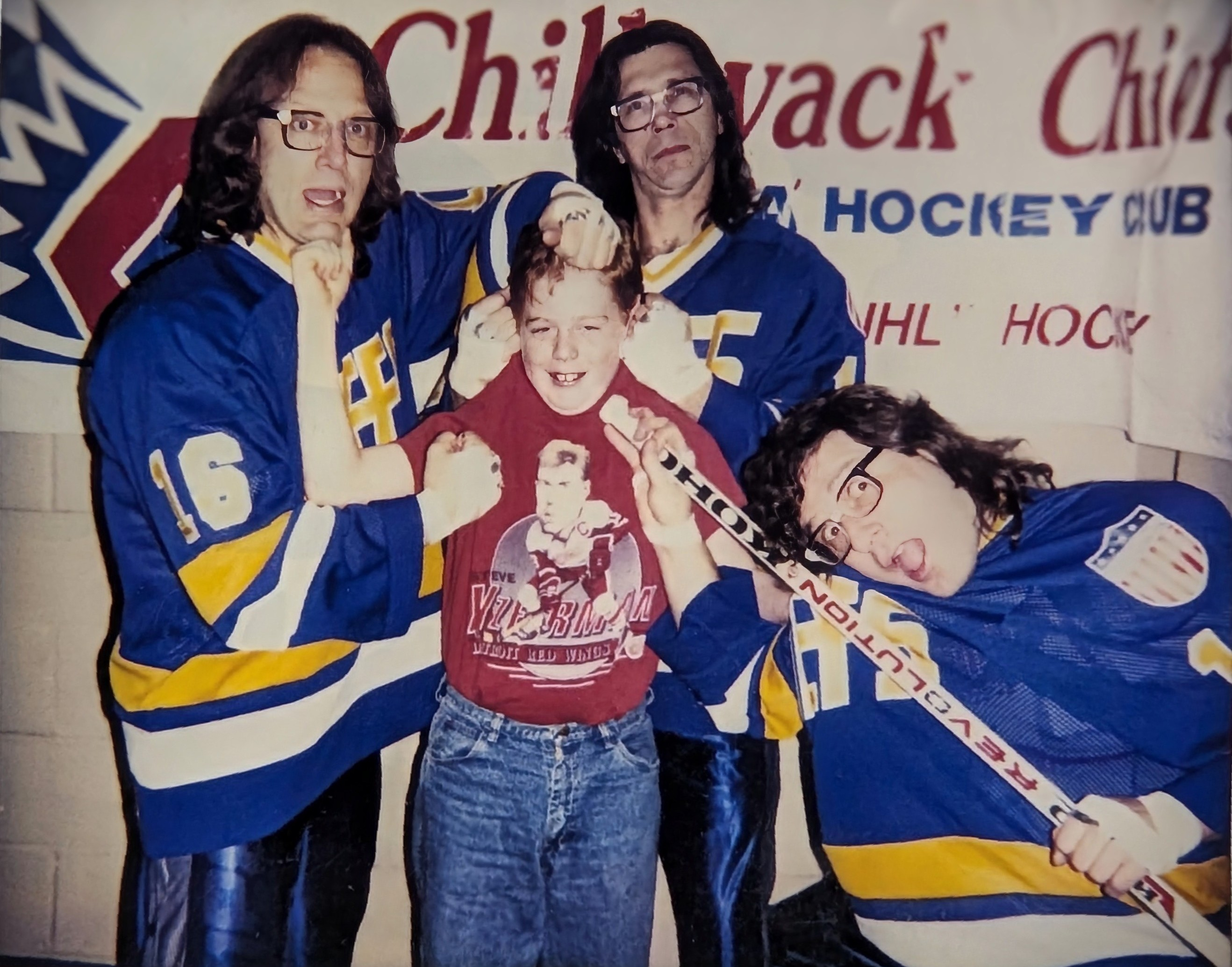
- Hanson (left) in 1998 photo
- Born: April 12, 1954 (age 72) Cumberland, Wisconsin, U.S.
- Height: 6 ft 1 in (185 cm)
- Weight: 205 lb (93 kg; 14 st 9 lb)
- Position: Defense
- Shot: Left
- Played for: Detroit Red Wings; Minnesota North Stars; New England Whalers; Minnesota Fighting Saints; Birmingham Bulls
- NHL draft: Undrafted
- WHA draft: 59th overall, 1974; Minnesota Fighting Saints
- Playing career: 1974–1984

David J. Hanson (born April 12, 1954) is an American former professional ice hockey player. He played 33 games in the National Hockey League between 1978 and 1980, and 103 games in the World Hockey Association between 1977 and 1979.

== Biography ==
Hanson was born in Cumberland, Wisconsin, and grew up in Saint Paul, Minnesota, where he eventually starred in football, baseball and hockey at Humboldt Senior High School.

Hanson continued playing hockey for the St. Paul Vulcans and for Herb Brooks's University of Minnesota college team. Hanson played four seasons for the Detroit Red Wings and Minnesota North Stars of the National Hockey League, and the New England Whalers, Minnesota Fighting Saints and Birmingham Bulls of the World Hockey Association. In a playoff game for the Bulls, he accidentally knocked off the hairpiece of Bobby Hull, who had to take a moment in the dressing room to get a helmet.

He was originally cast as "Dave 'Killer' Carlson" in the 1977 film Slap Shot, but when Jack Carlson was unable to perform because his team was in the playoffs, Hanson was recast as "Jack Hanson", one of the Hanson Brothers. Professional actor Jerry Houser was then cast as "Killer", the character based on Dave Hanson. Hanson appeared in several other films, and won a "DVD Premiere Award", along with fellow Hanson Brothers Steve and Jeff Carlson (brothers of Jack Carlson), for his part in the 2002 sequel Slap Shot 2: Breaking the Ice.

In 1977, Hanson married Sue Kaschalk, a coal miner's daughter from Nanty Glo, Pennsylvania. He has two daughters and one son, Christian, a center whose professional career included time with the Toronto Maple Leafs, AHL teams and the Norwegian champion Stavanger Oilers.

From 1984 to 1991, Hanson served as the general manager of the Gore Mountain Ski Area in the Adirondack Mountains and worked under Ned Harkness, who had been the general manager of the Adirondack Red Wings when Hanson played for the AHL team. After that, a recommendation from Harkness led to his appointment as the general manager of the Capital District Islanders, an AHL franchise in Upstate New York. In 1993, he organized a reunion of the Hanson Brothers before one of the team's home games that sold out the arena and also drew national attention. Hanson was fired from the position prior to the start of the 1993–94 season, after the team had relocated within the Capital District and became the Albany River Rats.

As of 2015 he resides in Pittsburgh, Pennsylvania, and manages a sports center at Robert Morris University.

== Career statistics ==
=== Regular season and playoffs ===
			Regular season					Playoffs
Season	Team	League	GP	G	A	Pts	PIM	GP	G	A	Pts	PIM
1973–74	St. Paul Vulcans	MidJHL	56	9	13	22	220	—	—	—	—	—
1973–74	Marquette Iron Rangers	USHL	—	—	—	—	—	—	—	—	—	—
1974–75	Johnstown Jets	NAHL	72	10	24	34	249	—	—	—	—	—
1975–76	Johnstown Jets	NAHL	66	8	21	29	311	9	0	3	3	54
1976–77	Johnstown Jets	NAHL	6	0	3	3	27	—	—	—	—	—
1976–77	Hampton Gulls	SHL	28	5	7	12	188	—	—	—	—	—
1976–77	Rhode Island Reds	AHL	27	2	10	12	98	—	—	—	—	—
1976–77	Minnesota Fighting Saints	WHA	7	0	2	2	35	—	—	—	—	—
1976–77	New England Whalers	WHA	1	0	0	0	9	1	0	0	0	0
1977–78	Kansas City Red Wings	CHL	15	0	0	0	41	—	—	—	—	—
1977–78	Hampton Gulls	AHL	5	0	3	3	8	—	—	—	—	—
1977–78	Birmingham Bulls	WHA	42	7	16	23	241	5	0	1	1	48
1978–79	Birmingham Bulls	WHA	53	6	22	28	212	—	—	—	—	—
1978–79	Detroit Red Wings	NHL	11	0	0	0	26	—	—	—	—	—
1979–80	Oklahoma City Stars	CHL	6	0	0	0	12	—	—	—	—	—
1979–80	Birmingham Bulls	CHL	33	4	6	10	174	—	—	—	—	—
1979–80	Minnesota North Stars	NHL	22	1	1	2	39	—	—	—	—	—
1980–81	Adirondack Red Wings	AHL	77	11	21	32	267	18	1	4	5	30
1981–82	Adirondack Red Wings	AHL	75	11	23	34	206	5	1	3	4	23
1982–83	Indianapolis Checkers	CHL	80	18	21	39	285	5	1	3	4	2
1983–84	Indianapolis Checkers	CHL	1	0	0	0	0	—	—	—	—	—
1983–84	Toledo Goaldiggers	IHL	68	11	26	37	120	9	1	3	4	33
WHA totals			103	13	40	53	497	6	0	1	1	48
NHL totals			33	1	1	2	65	—	—	—	—	—
