= Dick Roberge =

Canadian ice hockey player and coach (1934–2026)

- Born: April 7, 1934 Saskatoon, Saskatchewan, Canada
- Died: April 1, 2026 (aged 91)
- Height: 5 ft 9 in (175 cm)
- Weight: 168 lb (76 kg; 12 st 0 lb)
- Position: Right wing
- Shot: Right
- Played for: Johnstown Jets; New Westminster Royals; Pittsburgh Hornets
- National team: United States
- NHL draft: undrafted
- Playing career: 1954–1972

Richard Lewis Roberge (April 7, 1934 – April 1, 2026) was a Canadian professional ice hockey forward and coach. He holds the record for most minor-league goals scored with 752. He is thought to be the inspiration behind Paul Newman's character, Reggie Dunlop, in the movie Slap Shot and appears in the film in an uncredited role as a referee.

== Playing career ==
Roberge spent the majority of his career with the Johnstown Jets, joining the team at the start of the 1954–55 IHL season. He stayed with the Jets until the completion of the 1955–56 season where he led the league in goals scored (64) and points (118) before spending a season with the New Westminster Royals of the Western Hockey League. After playing three games with the Royals, Roberge returned to the Jets for the 1957–58 season. Roberge would lead the Jets with 37 goals but finished second in EHL scoring that season, finishing only one point behind linemate Don Hall and nine points behind Ken Coombes.

With the exception of a one-game call-up with the Pittsburgh Hornets during the 1962–63 season, Roberge remained with the Jets until his retirement after the 1971–72 EHL season. Roberge finished his career with 1,232 minor league games played, which is currently the 9th highest all-time total.

Despite being born in Canada, Roberge spent a season on the U.S. National Team in 1965–66.

Roberge's #11 was retired by the Johnstown Chiefs during the 1990–91 season.

== Coaching career ==
Roberge spent several years with the Jets as a player-coach, but eventually asked to relinquish his responsibilities as coach so he could focus on playing hockey. On July 22, 1971, GM John Mitchell granted a release to Roberge from coaching the Jets.

He eventually returned to the team as a full-time coach during the 1974–75 season where he led the team to the Lockhart Cup as winners of the NAHL playoffs.

Roberge later returned to Johnstown to coach the Johnstown Wings but was not nearly as successful, finishing 25-42-3.

== Later life and death ==
Roberge had a brief cameo in the 1977 movie Slap Shot, which was filmed in Johnstown. He appeared in the film as referee Ecker, who throws the Hanson Brothers out of their first game.

Roberge died on April 1, 2026, at the age of 91.

== Awards and accomplishments ==
=== Eastern Hockey League ===
- Most goals scored, single season: 1955–56 (64); 1960–61 (56)
- Most points scored, single season: 1955–56 (118); 1960–61 (116); 1964–65 (139);
- Winner, Boardwalk Trophy: 1959–60; 1960–61; 1961–62

=== North American Hockey League ===
- Winner, Lockhart Cup (1974–75, as coach)
