= Jack Carlson (ice hockey) =

American ice hockey player (born 1954)

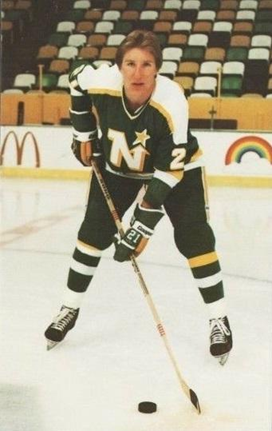
- Born: August 23, 1954 (age 71) Virginia, Minnesota, U.S.
- Height: 6 ft 3 in (191 cm)
- Weight: 205 lb (93 kg; 14 st 9 lb)
- Position: Left wing
- Shot: Left
- Played for: Minnesota Fighting Saints; Edmonton Oilers; New England Whalers; Minnesota North Stars; St. Louis Blues
- NHL draft: 117th overall, 1974; Detroit Red Wings
- WHA draft: 103rd overall, 1974; Minnesota Fighting Saints
- Playing career: 1974–1987

Jack Anthony Carlson (born August 23, 1954) is an American former professional ice hockey forward. He played in the World Hockey Association from 1974 to 1979 and in the National Hockey League from 1979 to 1987.

== Career ==
Carlson played in the World Hockey Association with the Minnesota Fighting Saints, Edmonton Oilers and New England Whalers, and in the National Hockey League for the Minnesota North Stars and St. Louis Blues. He accumulated 1,111 penalty minutes in 508 professional games. Late in his professional career, he came to be known as "Killer Carlson" because of "enforcer" style of play.

Carlson's brothers Steve and Jeff are also former professional hockey players, and are famous for roles in the movie Slap Shot as two of the Hanson Brothers. Carlson was originally supposed to play the third brother; however, he was called up by the Edmonton Oilers just before shooting and was replaced by Dave Hanson.

Carlson was an acting referee and linesman for the Twin Cities AHA Hockey League.

== Career statistics ==
=== Regular season and playoffs ===
| | | | Regular season | | | | | Playoffs |
| Season | Team | League | GP | G | A | Pts | PIM | GP | G | A | Pts | PIM |
|---|---|---|---|---|---|---|---|---|---|---|---|---|
| 1972–73 | Minnesota Rangers | USHL | 35 | 15 | 18 | 33 | 49 | — | — | — | — | — |
| 1973–74 | Marquette Iron Rangers | USHL | 55 | 42 | 30 | 72 | 175 | — | — | — | — | — |
| 1974–75 | Johnstown Jets | NAHL | 50 | 27 | 22 | 49 | 246 | — | — | — | — | — |
| 1974–75 | Minnesota Fighting Saints | WHA | 32 | 5 | 5 | 10 | 85 | 10 | 1 | 2 | 3 | 41 |
| 1975–76 | Minnesota Fighting Saints | WHA | 58 | 8 | 10 | 18 | 189 | — | — | — | — | — |
| 1975–76 | Edmonton Oilers | WHA | 10 | 1 | 1 | 2 | 31 | 4 | 0 | 0 | 0 | 4 |
| 1976–77 | Minnesota Fighting Saints | WHA | 36 | 4 | 3 | 7 | 55 | — | — | — | — | — |
| 1976–77 | New England Whalers | WHA | 35 | 7 | 5 | 12 | 81 | 5 | 1 | 1 | 2 | 9 |
| 1977–78 | New England Whalers | WHA | 67 | 9 | 20 | 29 | 192 | 9 | 1 | 1 | 2 | 14 |
| 1978–79 | New England Whalers | WHA | 34 | 2 | 7 | 9 | 61 | — | — | — | — | — |
| 1978–79 | Minnesota North Stars | NHL | 16 | 3 | 0 | 3 | 40 | — | — | — | — | — |
| 1980–81 | Minnesota North Stars | NHL | 43 | 7 | 2 | 9 | 108 | 15 | 1 | 2 | 3 | 50 |
| 1981–82 | Minnesota North Stars | NHL | 57 | 8 | 4 | 12 | 103 | 1 | 0 | 0 | 0 | 15 |
| 1982–83 | St. Louis Blues | NHL | 54 | 6 | 1 | 7 | 58 | 4 | 0 | 0 | 0 | 5 |
| 1983–84 | St. Louis Blues | NHL | 58 | 6 | 8 | 14 | 95 | 5 | 0 | 0 | 0 | 2 |
| 1986–87 | Minnesota North Stars | NHL | 8 | 0 | 0 | 0 | 13 | — | — | — | — | — |
| WHA totals | | | 272 | 36 | 51 | 87 | 694 | 28 | 3 | 4 | 7 | 68 |
| NHL totals | | | 236 | 30 | 15 | 45 | 417 | 25 | 1 | 2 | 3 | 72 |

== Transactions ==
- Selected by Detroit Red Wings, 7th Round, #117 overall, 1974 NHL Amateur Draft.
- Selected by Minnesota Fighting Saints, 9th round, #132 overall 1974 WHA Amateur Draft.
- Signed as a free agent by Edmonton (WHA) after Minnesota (WHA) franchise folded, on March 10, 1976.
- Claimed by Calgary (WHA) from Edmonton in 1976 WHA Intra-League Draft, June 1976.
- Sold to Edmonton (WHA) by Minnesota (WHA) with Mike Antonovich, Bill Butters, Dave Keon, Jean-Louis Levasseur, Steve Carlson, and John McKenzie for cash, January 1977.
- Traded to New England (WHA) by Edmonton (WHA) with Dave Keon, Steve Carlson, Dave Dryden, and John McKenzie for future considerations (Dave Debol, June 1977), Dan Arndt and cash, January 1977.
- Rights traded to Minnesota by Detroit for future considerations, July 27, 1978.
- Traded to Minnesota by New England (WHA) for future considerations, February 1, 1979.
- Missed the entire 1979–80 season recovering from back surgery.
- Claimed by St. Louis from Minnesota in Waiver Draft, October 4, 1982.
- Signed as a free agent by Minnesota, in November 1986.
