= Goldthorpe (surname) =

Goldthorpe is a surname. Notable people with the surname include:

- Albert Goldthorpe, English rugby footballer
- Bill "Goldie" Goldthorpe, Canadian ice hockey player
- John Goldthorpe, British sociologist
- John Goldthorpe (rugby league), rugby league footballer who played in the 1890s
- Noel Goldthorpe, Australian rugby league footballer
