= Christian Hanson (ice hockey) =

American ice hockey player (born 1986)

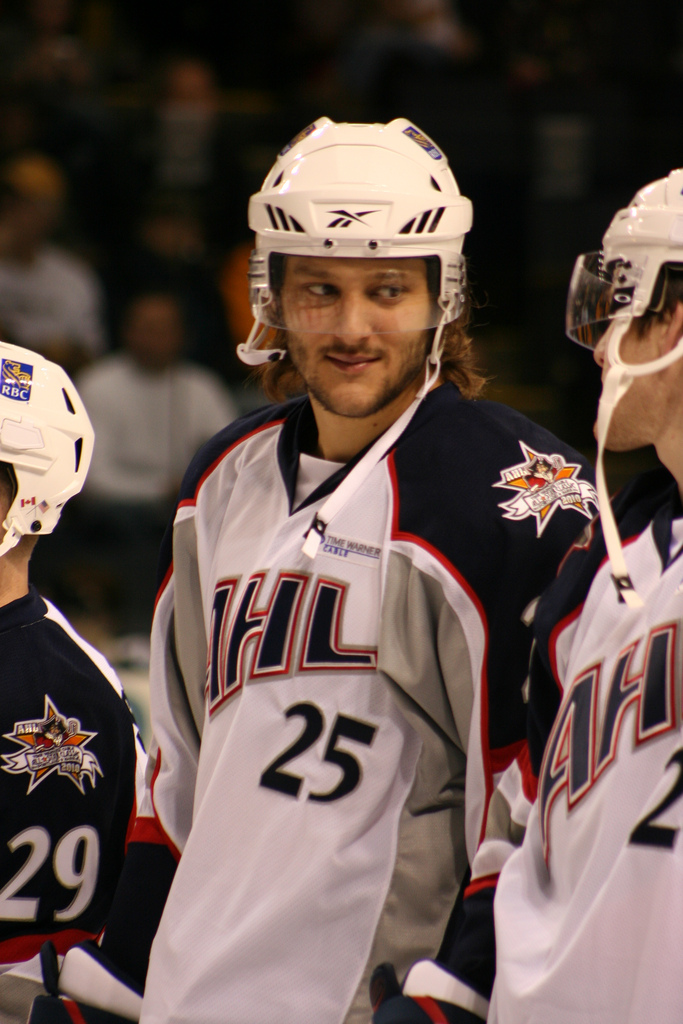
- Born: March 10, 1986 (age 40) Glens Falls, New York, U.S.
- Height: 6 ft 4 in (193 cm)
- Weight: 228 lb (103 kg; 16 st 4 lb)
- Position: Center
- Shot: Right
- Played for: Toronto Maple Leafs
- National team: United States
- NHL draft: Undrafted
- Playing career: 2009–2016

Christian David Hanson (born March 10, 1986) is an American former professional ice hockey player who played for the Toronto Maple Leafs in the NHL. Hanson played college hockey for the University of Notre Dame. He was not selected in the NHL entry draft but signed a contract as a free agent with the Maple Leafs after his senior season.

== Playing career ==
He attended high school at Peters Township High School, where he was a member of their Pennsylvania State AA Hockey Championship teams. He played for the Tri-City Storm in the state of Nebraska from 2003-2005. He played Midget "AAA" hockey for the Pittsburgh Hornets, where he was a teammate of Los Angeles Kings prospect Patrick Mullen.

Hanson was signed to a two-year, $1.575-million contract with the Toronto Maple Leafs on March 31, 2009, which included an annual $87,500 signing bonus.

Hanson made his NHL debut on April 3, 2009 against the Philadelphia Flyers. Four nights later, Hanson scored his first career NHL goal against Martin Brodeur in a 4–1 win over the New Jersey Devils. This goal tied his father's career goal mark as well. On April 10, 2010, Hanson recorded his first short-handed goal and his first multi-goal game versus Montreal.

Hanson was selected to join the Team USA roster for the 2010 World Hockey Championship.

Hanson played for Planet USA in the 2010 AHL All-Star Game in Portland, Maine.

On 10 July 2011, the Washington Capitals signed Hanson as an unrestricted free agent, and he was assigned to play in the AHL with the Hershey Bears for the 2011–12 AHL season.

On July 9, 2012, Hanson signed a one-year, two-way contract with the Boston Bruins. The contract paid Hanson $600,000 if he played in the NHL and $105,000 while playing with the Bruins' AHL affiliate, the Providence Bruins. Hanson spent the entire duration of the 2012–13 season with Providence and contributed 29 points in 67 games.

On August 20, 2013, Hanson agreed to a one-year, two-way contract with the St. Louis Blues. He played with the Blues' AHL affiliate, the Chicago Wolves, for the 2013–2014 season.

In a 2017 article for The Players' Tribune, Hanson said that he had retired from professional ice hockey and is working at Sutton Special Risk, a Toronto-based insurance company for which he is Assistant Vice President, Sports.

== Family ==
His father is Dave Hanson, who also played professional hockey and starred as one of the Hanson Brothers in the movie Slap Shot.

== Career statistics ==
=== Regular season and playoffs ===
			Regular season					Playoffs
Season	Team	League	GP	G	A	Pts	PIM	GP	G	A	Pts	PIM
2003–04	Tri-City Storm	USHL	58	11	8	19	35	9	2	1	3	4
2004–05	Tri-City Storm	USHL	60	19	33	52	23	9	1	2	3	8
2005–06	University of Notre Dame	CCHA	23	1	2	3	14	—	—	—	—	—
2006–07	University of Notre Dame	CCHA	33	6	2	8	24	—	—	—	—	—
2007–08	University of Notre Dame	CCHA	47	13	9	22	57	—	—	—	—	—
2008–09	University of Notre Dame	CCHA	37	16	15	31	28	—	—	—	—	—
2008–09	Toronto Maple Leafs	NHL	5	1	1	2	2	—	—	—	—	—
2009–10	Toronto Marlies	AHL	38	12	19	31	35	—	—	—	—	—
2009–10	Toronto Maple Leafs	NHL	31	2	5	7	16	—	—	—	—	—
2010–11	Toronto Marlies	AHL	58	13	21	34	51	—	—	—	—	—
2010–11	Toronto Maple Leafs	NHL	6	0	0	0	4	—	—	—	—	—
2011–12	Hershey Bears	AHL	52	10	11	21	42	—	—	—	—	—
2012–13	Providence Bruins	AHL	67	12	17	29	53	12	1	2	3	8
2013–14	Chicago Wolves	AHL	63	5	11	16	32	9	2	0	2	4
2014–15	Sun Valley Suns	BDHL	4	7	1	8	0	—	—	—	—	—
2014–15	Stavanger Oilers	GET	9	2	4	6	4	15	3	4	7	18
2015–16	Sun Valley Suns	BDHL	2	1	1	2	4	—	—	—	—	—
AHL totals			278	52	79	131	213	21	3	2	5	12
NHL totals			42	3	6	9	22	—	—	—	—	—

=== International ===
Year	Team	Event	GP	G	A	Pts	PIM
2010	United States	WC	6	0	1	1	2
Senior totals			6	0	1	1	2

== Awards and honors ==
Award	Year
All-CCHA Second Team	2008–09
