= The Asutra =

1974 novel by Jack Vance

- First edition (publ. Dell Books)
- Author: Jack Vance
- Publisher: Dell Books
- Publication date: January 1, 1973
- ISBN: 978-0-440-03157-4

The Asutra is a 1974 novel by Jack Vance.

== Plot summary ==
The Asutra is the third novel in the Durdane trilogy which the hero must discover where the mysterious Roguskhoi originate.

== Reception ==
Dave Langford reviewed The Asutra for White Dwarf #99, and stated that "Some of the freshness leaked out of this series by book 3: The Asutra isn't actively bad but seems perfunctory, the result of over-hasty production."

== Reviews ==
- Review by Chris Evans (1977) in Vector 84
- Review by Robin Marcus (1977) in Paperback Parlour, December 1977
- Review by Jerry L. Parsons (1979) in Science Fiction & Fantasy Book Review, August 1979
- Review by Bruce Gillespie (1989) in SF Commentary, #67
