= Ross Smith (ice hockey) =

Canadian ice hockey player

- Born: November 20, 1953 (age 71); Westlock, Alberta, Canada
- Height: 6 ft 0 in (183 cm)
- Weight: 184 lb (83 kg; 13 st 2 lb)
- Position: Right wing
- Shot: Left
- Played for: Indianapolis Racers
- NHL draft: Undrafted
- WHA draft: Undrafted
- Playing career: 1973–1976

Ross Smith (born November 20, 1953) is a Canadian former professional ice hockey player who played in the World Hockey Association (WHA). Smith played part of the 1974–75 WHA season with the Indianapolis Racers. He played the role of Barclay Donaldson in the 1977 comedy film Slap Shot.

== Career statistics ==
			Regular season					Playoffs
Season	Team	League	GP	G	A	Pts	PIM	GP	G	A	Pts	PIM
1971–72	Victoria Cougars	WCHL	18	1	2	3	65	—	—	—	—	—
1971–72	Calgary Centennials	WCHL	1	0	0	0	0	—	—	—	—	—
1972–73	Calgary Centennials	WCHL	57	8	6	14	111	—	—	—	—	—
1973–74	Columbus Owls	IHL	70	23	26	49	183	6	0	1	1	4
1974–75	Indianapolis Racers	WHA	15	1	6	7	19	—	—	—	—	—
1974–75	Mohawk Valley Comets	NAHL-Sr.	45	11	10	21	58	3	1	1	2	4
1975–76	Mohawk Valley Comets	NAHL-Sr.	49	9	3	12	103	4	1	0	1	6
WHA totals			15	1	6	7	19	—	—	—	—	—
