= Jim Mikol =

Canadian ice hockey player

- Born: June 11, 1938 Kitchener, Ontario, Canada
- Died: March 15, 2014 (aged 75) The Villages, Florida, U.S.
- Height: 6 ft 0 in (183 cm)
- Weight: 175 lb (79 kg; 12 st 7 lb)
- Position: Left wing/Defence
- Shot: Right
- Played for: Toronto Maple Leafs; New York Rangers
- Playing career: 1958–1970

James Stanley Mikol (June 11, 1938 – March 15, 2014) was a Canadian professional ice hockey player. A left winger and defenceman, he played 34 games in the National Hockey League (NHL) for the Toronto Maple Leafs and New York Rangers during the 1962–63 and 1964–65 seasons. The rest of his career, which lasted from 1958 to 1970, was spent in the minor leagues. He died in The Villages, Florida, in 2014.

== Career statistics ==
=== Regular season and playoffs ===
			Regular season					Playoffs
Season	Team	League	GP	G	A	Pts	PIM	GP	G	A	Pts	PIM
1956–57	Peterborough TPT Petes	OHA	13	2	0	2	4	—	—	—	—	—
1957–58	Peterborough TPT Petes	OHA	35	6	12	18	37	5	0	2	2	13
1958–59	North Bay Trappers	OHA Sr	48	3	11	14	47	—	—	—	—	—
1959–60	Johnstown Jets	EHL	64	11	14	25	101	13	2	5	7	18
1960–61	Cleveland Barons	AHL	70	12	22	34	116	4	0	0	0	0
1961–62	Cleveland Barons	AHL	70	32	48	80	89	6	1	4	5	12
1962–63	Toronto Maple Leafs	NHL	4	0	1	1	2	—	—	—	—	—
1962–63	Cleveland Barons	AHL	49	20	30	50	58	5	0	5	5	4
1963–64	Cleveland Barons	AHL	72	24	44	68	52	9	3	4	7	6
1964–65	New York Rangers	NHL	30	1	3	4	6	—	—	—	—	—
1964–65	St. Paul Rangers	CPHL	33	14	33	47	30	11	1	7	8	12
1965–66	Providence Reds	AHL	72	24	26	50	35	—	—	—	—	—
1966–67	Providence Reds	AHL	31	8	9	17	8	—	—	—	—	—
1967–68	Providence Reds	AHL	63	19	30	49	30	8	1	3	4	12
1968–69	Cleveland Barons	AHL	72	20	35	55	27	5	0	0	0	0
1969–70	Cleveland Barons	AHL	68	8	19	27	18	—	—	—	—	—
AHL totals			567	167	263	430	433	37	5	16	21	34
NHL totals			34	1	4	5	8	—	—	—	—	—
