= Galen Head =

Canadian ice hockey player (1947–2020)

- Born: April 16, 1947 Grande Prairie, Alberta, Canada
- Died: March 14, 2020 (aged 72) Johnstown, Pennsylvania, U.S.
- Height: 5 ft 9 in (175 cm)
- Weight: 160 lb (73 kg; 11 st 6 lb)
- Position: Right wing
- Shot: Right
- Played for: Detroit Red Wings
- NHL draft: Undrafted
- Playing career: 1967–1976

Galen Russell Head (April 16, 1947 – March 14, 2020) was a Canadian professional ice hockey player who spent the majority of his career, which lasted from 1967 to 1976, with the Johnstown Jets of the Eastern Hockey League and North American Hockey League. Head played one game in the NHL with the Detroit Red Wings during the 1967-68 NHL season and wore #15.

== Juniors ==
Head started out playing in the Grande Prairie Minor Hockey Association at age 13. Three years later, Head moved to senior hockey and played in the South Peace Hockey League as a member of the Grande Prairie Athletics, where he won SPHL Rookie Of The Year honors in 1963–64.

He remained with the Athletics until midway through the 1964–65 season, where he received an invite from the Edmonton Oil Kings. Head remained with the Oil Kings during the 1965–66 season, where he faced off against the Oshawa Generals, a team led by future Hockey Hall Of Fame member Bobby Orr. The Oil Kings defeated the Generals and won the Memorial Cup. Head scored 16 points in 19 games during the 1965–66 post-season.

Head continued to play with the Oil Kings for one more season, scoring 50 goals and 42 assists and trailing Garnet "Ace" Bailey in regular season point totals.

== Professional ==
Head received an invitation from the National Hockey League's Detroit Red Wings to attend training camp in the fall of 1967. In camp, he was assigned #15 and was given $130 for a one-game tryout but was released on September 22.

Head was later assigned to the Johnstown Jets, a team in the Eastern Hockey League. He scored 53 goals in his rookie season. As a result, Head was recalled by Detroit where he would "play six or seven shifts" in his only game with the Red Wings, on March 21, 1968, against the Toronto Maple Leafs. Head also had ice time with the Fort Worth Wings, another Detroit affiliate.

The following season, Head had his best statistical season. He scored 67 goals and 121 points in 72 games, which led all EHL players.

Head later became player/coach of the Jets during the 1973–74 season as a result of a coach walking out prior to the start of the season. Head was later named official head coach that season and be named captain of the team. He played until the 1975–76 season, after which he retired after eight seasons with the Jets.

Head ranks among the leader in many career statistics in Johnstown history. His 308 goals as a member of the Jets ranks third all time, while his 601 points rank fourth and his 293 assists are sixth highest. His 67 goal season and 69 single season goals (regular and post-season) were a record until former Johnstown Chiefs forward Mark Green eclipsed the totals with 68 goals in the regular season and 70 single season goals in 1991–92.

== Awards ==
- CMJHL Second All-Star Team – 1967

== Personal ==
Head, like several members of the 1975–76 Johnstown Jets, had a part in the movie Slap Shot. He played one of the uncredited hockey players. His wife, Grace Head, had a credited speaking part as "Pam", one of the hockey wives in the movie.

Head was one of several people responsible for founding the Bishop McCort hockey program in 1985. With Head leading the team as head coach, McCort won three Pennsylvania state championships over a period of eleven years.

On October 18, 2003, Head was the third person to have their number retired by the Johnstown Chiefs. Although he did not play for the Chiefs, as they were founded after his retirement, he was recognized for his contributions as a player with the Jets, his tenure with the Chiefs providing game night scouting reports, and for his contributions to hockey to the city of Johnstown. He is also a member of the Cambria County Sports Hall of Fame, the Johnstown Hockey Hall Of Fame, and the Grande Prairie Hockey Hall of Fame.

Head died in Johnstown, Pennsylvania on March 14, 2020.

== Career statistics ==
=== Regular season and playoffs ===
			Regular season					Playoffs
Season	Team	League	GP	G	A	Pts	PIM	GP	G	A	Pts	PIM
1964–65	Edmonton Red Wings	AJHL-B	—	—	—	—	—	—	—	—	—	—
1964–65	Edmonton Oil Kings	M-Cup	—	—	—	—	—	13	1	0	1	4
1965–66	Edmonton Oil Kings	ASHL	40	6	5	11	4	11	1	7	8	0
1965–66	Edmonton Oil Kings	M-Cup	—	—	—	—	—	19	12	4	16	19
1966–67	Edmonton Oil Kings	CMJHL	56	50	42	92	43	9	4	8	12	4
1967–68	Fort Worth Wings	CHL	4	3	1	4	4	2	1	0	1	0
1967–68	Johnstown Jets	EHL	70	53	52	105	31	3	2	0	2	0
1967–68	Detroit Red Wings	NHL	1	0	0	0	0	—	—	—	—	—
1968–69	Johnstown Jets	EHL	72	67	54	121	76	3	2	0	2	2
1969–70	Salt Lake Golden Eagles	WHL	43	9	12	21	6	—	—	—	—	—
1970–71	Johnstown Jets	EHL	67	31	27	58	42	10	7	3	10	2
1971–72	Johnstown Jets	EHL	75	37	34	71	43	11	2	5	7	2
1972–73	Johnstown Jets	EHL	72	44	33	77	37	12	4	6	10	6
1973–74	Johnstown Jets	NAHL	73	31	40	71	24	12	5	3	8	2
1974–75	Johnstown Jets	NAHL	58	18	23	41	30	15	8	10	18	—
1975–76	Johnstown Jets	NAHL	73	27	30	57	44	9	3	3	6	8
EHL totals			356	232	200	432	229	39	17	14	31	12
NHL totals			1	0	0	0	0	—	—	—	—	—

== See also ==
- List of players who played only one game in the NHL
