= Silver Lake Children's Theatre Group =

American children's drama group

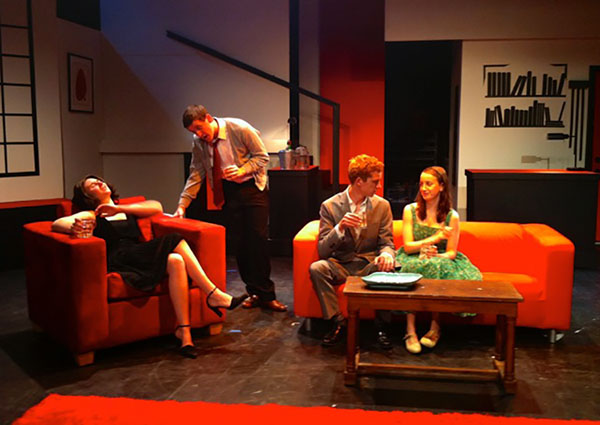
SCTG Production of "Who's Afraid Of Virginia Woolf?" (l to r: Izzy Miller, Leo Murphy, Max Messex, Mollie Goldberg)

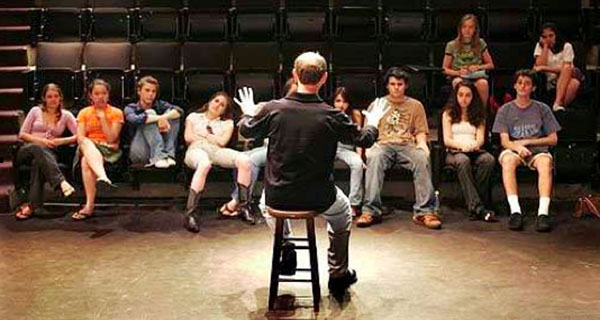
Broderick Miller directing the SCTG Cast

The Silver Lake Children's Theatre Group (SCTG) is an American incorporated 501(c)(3) organization providing drama training and productions for young people 7–18 years old.

Described as "smart theater for children" by the Los Angeles Times, the SCTG continues to present productions of children's theater with complex ideas, themes, characters, and staging. Nearly all plays are original productions co-written by the students through its Writing Mentorship Program.

The group is led by its co-founder, screenwriter Broderick Miller.
