= Broderick Miller =

American screenwriter

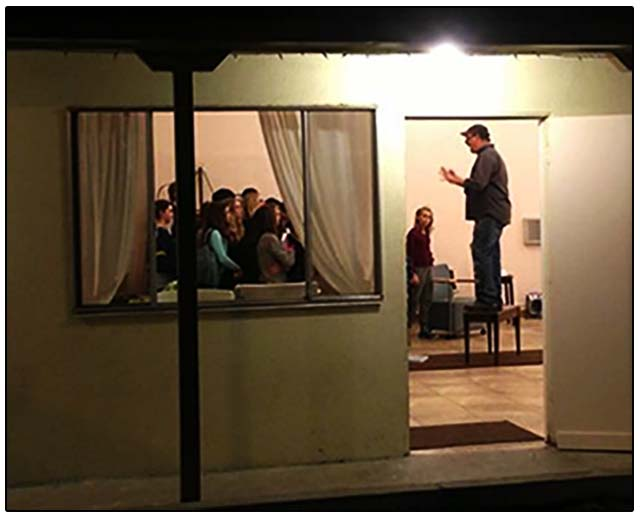
- Broderick Miller (2014)
- Born: Broderick Miller; Los Angeles, California, U.S.
- Occupation: Screenwriter/President & Artistic Director – Silver Lake Children's Theatre Group
- Children: Izzy Miller; Maddie Miller

Broderick Miller is an American screenwriter, known for his television and feature work.

Son of actor Frank Warren and godson actor Broderick Crawford, Miller attended Claremont McKenna College, where he earned degrees in film and political science. At a 1975 production of The Seagull in the West End of London Miller thanked Anderson for making his favorite film, O Lucky Man! Miller later worked as Anderson's personal assistant before serving as first assistant director on Anderson's last feature film, The Whales of August (1987).

Miller's first screenplay Deadlock (1991 – titled Wedlock abroad) was made into an HBO film starring Rutger Hauer and Mimi Rogers, and he also served as associate producer. His other screenwriting work includes Slap Shot 2: Breaking the Ice and Deadlocked: Escape from Zone 14. plus the TV pilots for Deadwood (unrelated to the HBO show of the same name) and Don't Be Cruel. He has also been developing his script The Escape Artist with Steven Spielberg for DreamWorks. Miller also wrote the short subject Grandfather’s Birthday, (2000) which won a Regional Emmy Award from the National Academy of Television Arts & Sciences' Minnesota chapter.

In 2001, Miller co-founded the Silver Lake Children's Theatre Group, as a means for young actors to explore the human condition through challenging themes, material, staging and characters.

== Filmography ==
- 1987 The Whales Of August, First assistant director
- 1991 Deadlock, Screenplay/Associate Producer/Cameo appearance
- 1993 Don't Be Cruel, Screenplay
- 1995 Deadlocked: Escape From Zone 14, Story and teleplay
- 2000 Grandfather's Birthday, Writer
- 2002 Slap Shot 2: Breaking The Ice, Screenplay/Cameo appearance
- 2002 Slap Shot 2: Behind The Glass, Himself/Documentary Short
- 2005 Wal-Mart: The High Cost of Low Price Special thanks
