= Don Hall (ice hockey) =

Canadian ice hockey player

- Born: April 2, 1930 Toronto, Ontario, Canada
- Died: December 24, 2017 (aged 87) Mechanicsburg, Pennsylvania, U.S.
- Height: 5 ft 10 in (178 cm)
- Weight: 175 lb (79 kg; 12 st 7 lb)
- Position: Right wing
- Shot: Right
- Played for: Johnstown Jets; Rochester Americans; Toledo Mercurys
- Playing career: 1950–1962

Donald John Hall (April 2, 1930 – December 24, 2017) was a Canadian professional ice hockey player who spent the majority of his career with the Johnstown Jets of the Eastern Hockey League.

In 1946, at the age of 16, Hall signed with the Toronto Maple Leafs. In 1951 he signed with the Johnstown Jets, a farm team of the Montreal Canadiens. Upon signing, Hall agreed to sign a "C-form", which allowed the Canadiens to own Hall's rights as a professional hockey player. During Hall's rookie season, he played against future hockey Hall of Fame forward Maurice Richard in an exhibition game on November 20, 1951, in front of 1,638 fans at the Cambria County War Memorial Arena. Although Hall did not score that night, Richard scored six goals against Ivan Walmsley, who was considered to be the Jets' standout goaltender at the time.

Hall played 754 games in eleven years with the Jets. In that time he scored 424 career goals, the second-highest total in team history, and had 641 assists and 1,056 points. At the time of his retirement, he was the all-time leading scorer in organized hockey. He made the All-Star team nine times.

After retiring in 1962, Hall coached an EHL All-Star team which toured the Soviet Union. In Hall's words, their team got "creamed" and didn't win a game until they reached Czechoslovakia. "They sent their best teams," Hall said, "and they didn't lay down for anybody."

Hall's jersey number 9 was retired by the Johnstown Chiefs during the 1990–91 season, in honour of his distinguished career with the Jets. A banner commemorating his retirement hangs in the Cambria Country War Memorial Arena.

Hall resided in Johnstown, Pennsylvania, with his wife, Jean. They had three children.

== Awards ==
- 1953–54: George H. Wilkinson Trophy, awarded to the IHL's leading scorer
