= Ned Dowd =

American film producer and former actor

- Born: May 26, 1950 (age 76); Boston, Massachusetts, U.S.
- Occupations: Film producer, actor
- Years active: 1984-present
- Spouse: Nancy N. Dowd
- Relatives: Nancy Dowd (Sister)

Ned Dowd (born May 26, 1950) is an American film producer and former actor.

== Hockey career ==
After graduating from Bowdoin College in 1972, Dowd earned a master's degree at McGill University and played professional hockey. He was signed originally by the St. Louis Blues of the NHL and assigned to their minor league affiliate Johnstown Jets, for whom he played during the 1973–74 and 1974-75 seasons. He also played minor league hockey for the Kalamazoo Wings of the IHL during the 1974-75 season.

== Film career ==
The film Slap Shot (1977), written by his sister, Nancy Dowd, is based in part on his experiences playing in the minor leagues. Dowd served as technical advisor for the film and appeared in the film as notorious hockey player Ogie Ogelthorpe. His role as technical advisor included training star Paul Newman on how to play and coach ice hockey. Film critic Pauline Kael suggested that the Slap Shot character Ned Brandon was based on Dowd. His wife, Nancy N. Dowd (not to be confused with his sister), also appears in the movie as the wife of one of the players.

Besides serving as an advisor on Slap Shot, he also served as a technical advisor for the 1977 TV drama The Deadliest Season. He continued to occasionally act until 1996, but focused his career on becoming an assistant director and eventually a line producer. He had small parts in several films, the last being Bottle Rocket (1996), and has been a producer of such films as The Last of the Mohicans (1992), Shanghai Noon (2000), Wonder Boys (2000), and Apocalypto (2006).

== Career statistics ==
			Regular season					Playoffs
Season	Team	League	GP	G	A	Pts	PIM	GP	G	A	Pts	PIM
1969-70	Bowdoin College	NESCAC	22	8	7	15	24	—	—	—	—	—
1970-71	Bowdoin College	NESCAC	23	12	17	29	31	—	—	—	—	—
1971-72	Bowdoin College	NESCAC	22	23	17	40	34	—	—	—	—	—
1972-73	McGill University	CIAU	—	15	31	46	—	—	—	—	—	—
1973-74	Johnstown Jets	NAHL	74	32	30	62	69	12	3	3	6	4
1974-75	Kalamazoo Wings	IHL	13	3	4	7	19	—	—	—	—	—
1974-75	Johnstown Jets	NAHL	43	10	16	26	26	5	1	2	3	0
