= Hanson Brothers =

Fictional hockey players

- Slap Shot characters
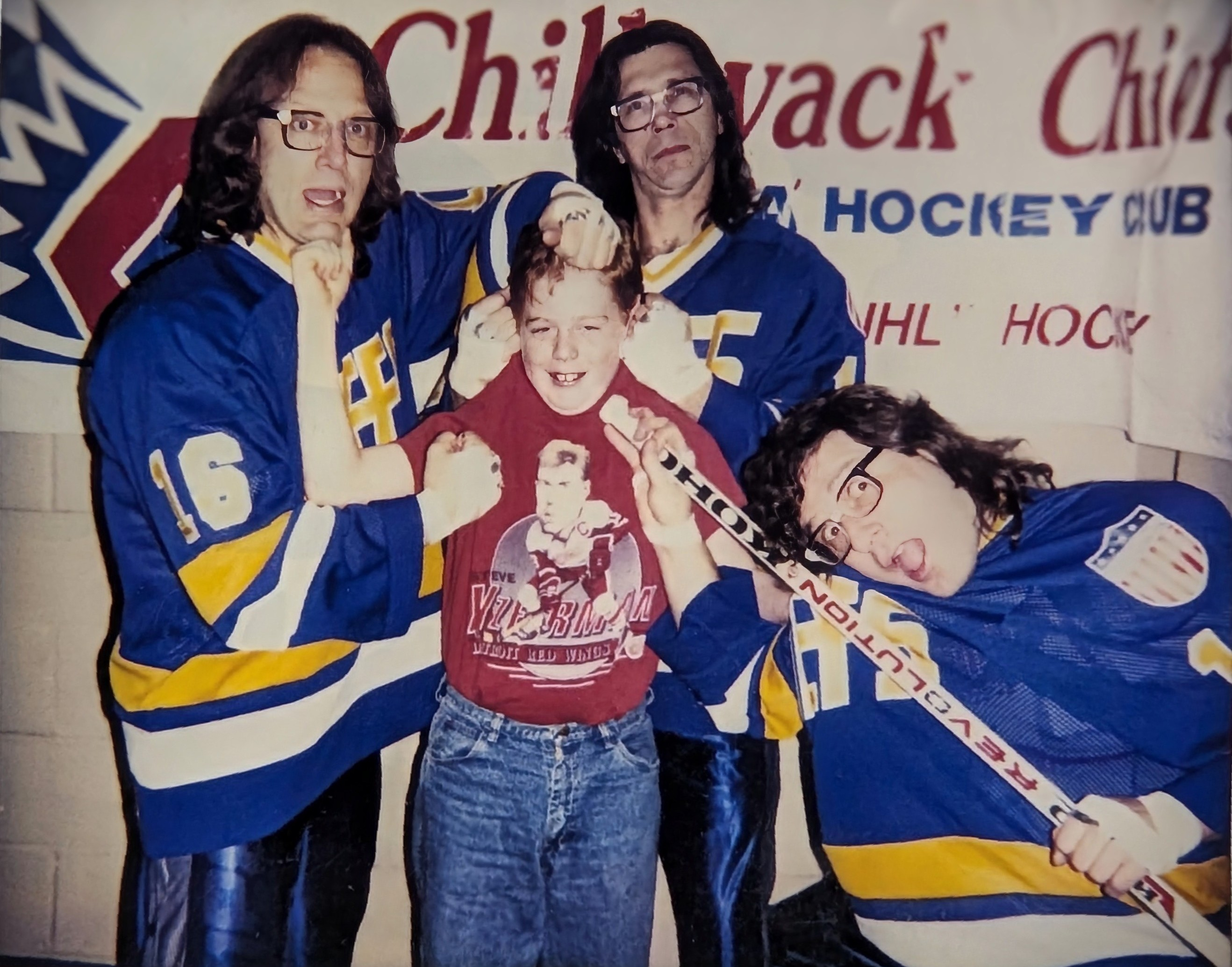
- The Hanson Brothers with a fan
- First appearance: Slap Shot; 1977
- Last appearance: Slap Shot 3: The Junior League; 2008
- Based on: Carlson brothers
- Team: Charlestown Chiefs
- League: Federal League; Iron League
- Based on: Carlson Brothers
- Occupation: Ice hockey players

Dave
- Portrayed by: David Hanson
- Age: 19
- Number: #16
- Based on: Jack Carlson
- Full name: Dave Hanson
- Position: Left wing

Steve
- Portrayed by: Steve Carlson
- Age: 20
- Number: #17
- Based on: Steve Carlson
- Full name: Steve Hanson
- Position: Centre

Jeff
- Portrayed by: Jeff Carlson
- Age: 18
- Number: #18
- Based on: Jeff Carlson
- Full name: Jeff Hanson
- Position: Right wing

The Hanson Brothers are a fictional trio of siblings who played for the fictional minor league ice hockey team the Charlestown Chiefs in the 1977 movie Slap Shot and its two sequels. The characters – Dave, Steve, and Jeff Hanson – were based on real-life siblings Jack, Steve, and Jeff Carlson, who played for the 1974-75 Johnstown Jets in the North American Hockey League. Characters Steve and Jeff Hanson were portrayed by their real-life namesakes Steve and Jeff. Jack Carlson was unavailable at the time of filming, so the role of Dave Hanson was portrayed by fellow Johnstown Jets teammate David Hanson. David himself was the inspiration for another character in the movie, Dave "Killer" Carlson, who was portrayed by Jerry Houser. The original screenplay was written by Nancy Dowd, sister of Johnstown Jets teammate Ned Dowd, who also appeared in the movie as the character Ogie Ogelthorpe.

The movie is an R-rated comedy starring Paul Newman as player-coach Reggie Dunlop. It follows the struggling Charlestown Chiefs in what is rumoured (and later confirmed) to be the team's last season, due to low ticket sales. The Hansons are a mid-season cut-rate acquisition by the team's general manager, Joe McGrath. They are initially looked at with scorn by their teammates and coach, due to their childlike immaturity, thick black-rimmed glasses, and propensity for brawling. The brothers eventually prove their worth and generate a renewed enthusiasm with their violent playing style.

== Legacy and public appearances ==
The Hansons (and Slap Shot) have an enduring cultural following. They receive more than 300 requests per year to make appearances. The film is standard viewing for young ice hockey players on road trips, including Christian Hanson, son of David Hanson, who saw the film for the first time when he was 11 years old during a hockey road trip with his team. After the Humboldt Broncos bus crash in 2018, a broken Slap Shot DVD was found at the crash site. Steve Carlson met with some of the survivors.

The idea of a Hanson Brothers reunion was first pitched to Steve Carlson in 1993 as a way to increase ticket sales for the Memphis Riverkings, a Central Hockey League team that he was then coaching. The arena sold out. A few weeks later, they held a second reunion at a home game for the AHL Capital District Islanders where Dave Hanson was the general manager. That event sold out too. Sixteen years after the film's release, the Hansons began appearing in character at charity and promotional events at arenas throughout the United States, Canada and Europe. At their peak, they were making about 90 appearances per year and had a sponsorship deal with Budweiser.

Nancy Dowd criticized the appearances, claiming they diminished the value of Slap Shot and violated her author's rights. In response, Dave Hanson contended, "I’m so sorry she’s mad at us. I don’t know what dirty-old-man jokes she means. When we come out, we talk to kids about how they’re doing in school and how their grades are. We’re colorful and lighthearted. There’s nothing insulting about what we do. If anything, to my mind, we’re helping to prolong the legacy of Slap Shot.”

As of 2020, the group does not tour together due to personal differences.

== Trivia ==
- The Cleveland Monsters of the American Hockey League employ a trio of Hanson lookalikes known as the Mullet Brothers, who sport long black hair and black-rimmed glasses. The "brothers" shovel snow out of the net area during breaks in full uniform and pads.
- Extreme Championship Wrestling characters The Dudley Brothers were based on the Hanson brothers. Two members of this stable, Bubba Ray & D-Von, would later shed the comedic elements of the gimmick and go on to become the Dudley Boyz tag team.
- At the June 2011 NHL Awards, the Hanson Brothers appeared in a spoof sketch based on the television series Pawn Stars, in which they try to sell the Stanley Cup to proprietor Rick Harrison at his pawn shop.
- In 2015 the Hanson Brothers were inducted into the Fictitious Athlete Hall of Fame. That same year, the trio would give a pregame speech to the Pittsburgh Penguins before a preseason game against the Tampa Bay Lightning.
- In addition to the original film, Slap Shot (1977), all three actors reprised their roles as the Hanson Brothers in two sequels, Slap Shot 2 (2002) and Slap Shot 3 (2008).
- A trio of hockey players all named Jim in Shoresy are based on the Hanson Brothers.
- In the Japanese hockey comic series Dogsred a trio of hockey playing brothers from Nikko, each sporting long hair, thick-rimmed glasses, and aggressive attitudes, become rivals of the main character.
