= Wedlock (film) =

- DVD cover
- Written by: Broderick Miller
- Directed by: Lewis Teague
- Starring: Rutger Hauer; Mimi Rogers; James Remar; Joan Chen; Stephen Tobolowsky; Grand L. Bush
- Music by: Richard Gibbs
- Country of origin: United States
- Original language: English

Production
- Executive producers: Frederick S. Pierce; Michael Jaffe
- Producer: Branko Lustig
- Cinematography: Dietrich Lohmann
- Editor: Carl Cress
- Running time: 100 minutes

Original release
- Network: HBO
- Release: December 10, 1991

Wedlock (titled Deadlock for some releases) is a 1991 American science fiction-action television film that aired on HBO on December 10, 1991. It was directed by Lewis Teague and starring Rutger Hauer, Mimi Rogers, Joan Chen, and James Remar. It received an Emmy Nomination for Sound Editing.

The film follows a diamond thief sent to a prison which uses new technology linked explosive neck collars to keep its prisoners from escaping. After learning who his collar is linked to, they escape, but the police pursuing them and those who want the diamonds are a constant threat.

== Synopsis ==
The story follows Frank Warren (Hauer), a jewel thief and electronics expert who is betrayed by his accomplices after a successful diamond heist. Frank is sentenced to Camp Holliday, an experimental prison where inmates are fitted with explosive electronic collars linked to unknown partners. If linked inmates are separated by more than 100 yards, both collars detonate. Frank eventually identifies his partner as Tracy Riggs (Rogers), and the two must escape captivity while evading Frank's double-crossing partners to recover the stolen diamonds.

== Plot ==
Frank Warren, an electronics expert and jewel thief, orchestrates a robbery at a diamond exchange with his long-time friend Sam and fiancée Noelle. After the heist, Frank successfully hides the stolen diamonds, but is immediately betrayed by his partners, who alert the authorities. Frank is arrested, but manages to keep the specific location of the stash a secret from the police, as well as from Sam and Noelle.

Frank is sentenced to 12 years at Camp Holliday, an experimental "future prison" run by the sadistic Warden Holliday. There are no bars or fences; instead, every prisoner is fitted with a sealed electronic collar—a "Wedlock." Each collar is electronically linked to that of another random inmate. The identities of the partners are kept secret from the prisoners. If the two linked inmates are separated by more than 100 yards (91 m), or if anyone attempts to tamper with the devices, both collars detonate, decapitating the wearers.

Warden Holliday attempts to bully Frank into revealing the location of the diamonds, but Frank refuses. While in the prison yard, Frank discovers his "Wedlock" partner is Tracy Riggs, a prisoner who claims she was wrongly convicted, after they accidentally separate and their collars begin to chime a warning.

Sam and Noelle, desperate for the diamonds, track Frank to Camp Holliday. They stage a violent ambush on a prisoner transport bus to kidnap Frank. In the ensuing chaos, Frank and Tracy manage to escape both the authorities and Frank's treacherous former partners. Forced to stay within close proximity to avoid detonation, the pair flees across the country with the police and the betrayal team in pursuit.

During the journey, Frank and Tracy struggle to get along, but eventually develop a romantic bond. They track down an old associate of Frank's named Jasper, who possesses the skills to remove the collars. However, they are ambushed by Sam and Noelle before the procedure is finished. Frank and Tracy manage to escape, with Noelle killing Sam in the process, and successfully remove their collars.

Frank leads Tracy to the hiding spot of the diamonds. However, Warden Holliday, who has been tracking them using the internal transponders in the removed collars, arrives in a helicopter to claim the loot for himself. In the final confrontation, Frank manages to outsmart the Warden. He attaches a collar to Holliday and throws the matching linked collar into the Warden's departing helicopter. As the helicopter flies away, the distance limit is breached, killing the Warden and destroying the aircraft.

With their enemies dead and the collars gone, Frank and Tracy reclaim the diamonds and drive off together to start a new life.

== Cast ==
- Rutger Hauer as Frank Warren
- Mimi Rogers as Tracy Riggs
- Joan Chen as Noelle
- James Remar as Sam
- Stephen Tobolowsky as Warden Holliday
- Basil Wallace as "Emerald"
- Grand L. Bush as Jasper
- Denis Forest as Puce
- Glenn Plummer as Teal
- Danny Trejo as Tough Prisoner #1

== Production ==
Wedlock was filmed in and around Los Angeles, California from November 6 to December 19, 1990, at various locations including Terminal Island (for the port scenes and the abandoned nuclear power site), the LA River, Downtown, the Old Zoo (Griffith Park, for the sleep in the cave scene), Brandeis-Bardin Institute in Simi Valley (used for exterior shots of the prison) and Southern California.

== DVD release ==
Xenon Entertainment released the film onto DVD in 2004.
