= Johnstown Jets =

Former professional minor league ice hockey team in Johnstown, Pennsylvania

- City: Johnstown, Pennsylvania
- League: EAHL 1950–1953; IHL 1953–1955; EHL, 1955–1973; NAHL 1973–1977
- Operated: 1950–1977
- Home arena: Cambria County War Memorial Arena

Championships
- Regular season titles: EHL (4) (1950–51, 1951–52, 1959–60, 1963–64)
- Division titles: EHL (4) (1950–51, 1951–52, 1959–60, 1963–64); NAHL (1) (1975–76)
- Playoff championships: EHL (5) (1951–52, 1952–53, 1959–60, 1960–61, 1961–62); NAHL (1) (1974–75)

The Johnstown Jets were a professional ice hockey team from Johnstown, Pennsylvania. The Jets were founded in the Eastern Amateur Hockey League for the 1950–51 season, playing at the newly constructed Cambria County War Memorial Arena. The Jets won consecutive EHL championships in 1951–52 and 1952–53.

When the EAHL suspended operations in 1953, the Jets transferred to the International Hockey League, where they played two seasons. Johnstown were Turner Cup finalists in 1953–54, losing four games to two, to the Cincinnati Mohawks.

In 1955, the Jets joined the Eastern Hockey League (a league founded from the EAHL), and won three consecutive EHL championships in 1959–60, 1960–61 and 1961–62. Johnstown remained in the league until its demise in 1973.

The Jets then joined the new North American Hockey League in 1973. Dick Roberge coached Johnstown to the Lockhart Cup championship 1974–75, defeating the Broome Dusters. That season's playoff run included the Carlson brothers, Jeff, Jack and Steve, who became the basis for the Hanson Brothers in the movie Slap Shot. Jeff and Steve Carlson portrayed their fictional selves in the movie, while former Jet Dave Hanson portrayed Jack. The Jets played four seasons total in the NAHL before the league folded in 1977. The team itself folded in the offseason, when the Johnstown flood of 1977 damaged the arena's ice making equipment.

Johnstown was later represented by the Johnstown Wings (later Red Wings) from 1978 to 1980. The Red Wings folded after two seasons, but hockey returned to Johnstown in 1988 with the Johnstown Chiefs, which named itself after the Jets' fictional counterpart from Slap Shot.

== Season-by-season results ==
Season	League	Games	Won	Lost	Tied	Points	Winning %	Goals for	Goals against	Standing
1950–51	EAHL	54	26	25	3	55	0.509	195	194	1st, EAHL
1951–52	EAHL	65	39	21	5	83	0.638	264	186	1st, EAHL
1952–53	EAHL	60	28	29	3	59	0.492	226	244	2nd, EAHL
1953–54	IHL	65	35	27	3	73	0.562	254	221	3rd, IHL
1954–55	IHL	60	25	34	1	51	0.425	188	215	5th, IHL
1955–56	EHL	64	32	32	0	64	0.500	312	298	4th, EHL
1956–57	EHL	64	31	33	0	62	0.484	320	290	4th, EHL
1957–58	EHL	64	31	30	3	65	0.508	228	225	4th, EHL
1958–59	EHL	64	33	28	3	69	0.539	252	223	2nd, EHL
1959–60	EHL	64	45	18	1	91	0.711	255	176	1st, South
1960–61	EHL	64	40	22	2	82	0.641	273	215	2nd, South
1961–62	EHL	68	41	26	1	83	0.610	296	255	2nd, North
1962–63	EHL	68	34	31	3	71	0.522	254	309	3rd, North
1963–64	EHL	72	41	26	5	87	0.604	297	245	1st, North
1964–65	EHL	72	41	31	0	82	0.569	330	294	3rd, North
1965–66	EHL	72	39	31	2	80	0.556	303	267	3rd, North
1966–67	EHL	72	34	36	2	70	0.486	267	290	3rd, North
1967–68	EHL	72	38	25	9	85	0.590	386	273	3rd, North
1968–69	EHL	72	42	23	7	91	0.632	358	230	2nd, North
1969–70	EHL	74	27	33	14	68	0.459	318	344	3rd, North
1970–71	EHL	74	30	29	15	75	0.507	273	297	3rd, North
1971–72	EHL	75	33	28	14	80	0.533	290	269	2nd, North
1972–73	EHL	76	36	28	12	84	0.553	283	255	2nd, North
1973–74	NAHL	74	32	38	4	68	0.459	265	303	5th, NAHL
1974–75	NAHL	74	38	32	4	80	0.541	274	255	4th, NAHL
1975–76	NAHL	74	47	25	2	96	0.649	346	257	1st, West
1976–77	NAHL	73	22	49	2	46	0.315	253	334	7th, NAHL

== NHL alumni ==
Jets logo in NAHL, 1976

List of Johnstown Jets who played in the National Hockey League, 46 in total.

- Lloyd Ailsby
- Wayne Bianchin
- Bruce Boudreau
- Ross Brooks
- Andy Brown
- Fred Burchell
- Jack Carlson
- Steve Carlson
- Dwight Carruthers
- Mike Chernoff
- Gary Collins
- Joe Daley
- Nick Damore
- Bob Dawes
- Norm Defelice
- Guy Delparte
- Marv Edwards
- Rocky Farr
- Harry Frost
- Gary Gambucci
- Bob Gryp
- Dave Hanson
- Galen Head
- Paul Holmgren
- Eddie Johnston
- Larry Johnston
- Eddie Kachur
- Ken Kilrea
- Ted Lanyon
- Jean-Louis Levasseur
- Dave Lucas
- Ralph MacSweyn
- Jim Mair
- Brian Marchinko
- Jack McIntyre
- Don McLean
- Jim Mikol
- Jim Murray
- Joe Schaefer
- Don Simmons
- Bob Sneddon
- Morris Stefaniw
- Gilles Villemure
- Bob Warner
- Bob Whitlock
- Joe Zanussi

== League All-Stars ==
The following players were named to the league's respective All-Star team, announced at the end of the season.

Year	Player	Position	Team	Total (with Jets)
1951-52	Ivan Wamsley	Goalie	First Team	1st nomination
	Larry Archambeault	Defense	First Team	1st nomination
	Skip Burchell	Center	First Team	1st nomination
	Reggie Grigg	Right Wing	Third Team	1st nomination
1952-53	Ivan Wamsley	Goalie	Second Team	2nd nomination (1x First Team, 1x Second Team)
	Don Hall	Left Wing	Second Team	1st nomination
1953-54	Don Hall	Left Wing	First Team	2nd nomination (1x First Team, 1x Second Team)
	Arnie Schmaultz	Right Wing	Right Team	1st nomination
1954-55	Don Hall	Left Wing	First Team	3rd nomination (2x First Team, 1x Second Team)
	John Horvath	Center	Second Team	1st nomination
1955-56	Don Hall	Left Wing	First Team	4th nomination (3x First Team, 1x Second Team)
	Ken Coombes	Center	First Team	1st nomination
	Dick Roberge	Right	First Team	1st nomination
	Alex Zubatiuk	Defense	Second Team	1st nomination
1956-57	Don Hall	Left Wing	First Team	5th nomination (4x First Team, 1x Second Team)
	Lloyd Ailsby	Defense	First Team	1st nomination
	Ken Coombes	Center	First Team	1st nomination
1957-58	Don Hall	Left Wing	First Team	6th nomination (5x First Team, 1x Second Team)
	Ken Coombes	Center	First Team	2nd nomination (2x First Team)
	Dick Roberge	Right Wing	Second Team	2nd nomination (1x First Team, 1x Second Team)
	Dave Lucas	Defense	Second Team	1st nomination
1958-59	Dick Roberge	Right Wing	First Team	3rd nomination (2x First Team, 1x Second Team)
	Steve Brklacich	Defense	First Team	First nomination
	Don Hall	Left Wing	Second Team	7th nomination (5x First Team, 2x Second Team)
	Jim Shirley	Goalie	Second Team	1st nomination
1959-60	Dick Roberge	Right Wing	First Team	4th nomination (3x First Team, 1x Second Team)
	Ed Johnston	Goalie	First Team	1st nomination
	Steve Brklacich	Coach	First Team	2nd nomination (1x First Team Defense, 1x First Team Coach)
	Steve Brklacich	Defense	Second Team	3rd nomination (1x First Team Defense, 1x Second Team Defense, 1x First Team Coach)
	Don Hall	Left Wing	Second Team	8th nomination (5x First Team, 3x Second Team)
	Dave Lucas	Defense	Second Team	2nd nomination (2x Second Team)
	Ken Coombes	Center	Second Team	3rd nomination (2x First Team, 1x Second Team)
1960-61	Dick Roberge	Right Wing	First Team	4th nomination (3x First Team, 1x Second Team)
	Don Hall	Left Wing	Second Team	9th nomination (5x First Team, 4x Second Team)
	Ken Laufman	Center	Second Team	1st nomination
	Steve Brklacich	Defense	Second Team	4th nomination (1x First Team Defense, 2x Second Team Defense, 1x First Team Coach)
1961-62	Dick Roberge	Right Wing	First Team	5th nomination (4x First Team, 1x Second Team)
	Ken Laufman	Center	First Team	2nd nomination (2x First Team)
	John Lumley	Left Wing	First Team	1st nomination
	Dave Lucas	Defense	First Team	3rd nomination (1x First Team, 2x Second Team)
1962-63	Butch Martin	Coach	First Team	1st nomination
	Butch Martin	Left Wing	Second Team	2nd nomination (1x First Team Coach, 1x Second Team Left Wing)
	Dave Lucas	Defense	Second Team	4th nomination (1x First Team, 3x Second Team)
1963-64	Dave Lucas	Defense	First Team	5th nomination (2x First Team, 3x Second Team)
	Butch Martin	Right Wing	Second Team	3rd nomination (1x First Team Coach, 1x Second Team Left Wing, 1x Second Team Right Wing)
	Butch Martin	Coach	Second Team	3rd nomination (1x First Team Coach, 1x Second Team Left Wing, 1x Second Team Right Wing, 1x Second Team Coach)
1964-65	Dick Roberge	Right Wing	First Team	6th nomination (5x First Team, 1x Second Team)
	Dave Lucas	Defense	Second Team	6th nomination (2x First Team, 4x Second Team)
	Bill Ives	Left Wing	Second Team	1st nomination
1965-66	Dick Roberge	Right Wing	First Team	7th nomination (6x First Team, 1x Second Team)
	Dave Lucas	Defense	Second Team	7th nomination (2x First Team, 5x Second Team)
	Dave Lucas	Coach	Second Team	8th nomination (2x First Team Defense, 5x Second Team Defense, 1x Second Team Coach)
	Andy Brown	Goalie	Second Team	1st nomination
1966-67	Ralph McSweyn	Right Wing	First Team	1st nomination
	Dick Roberge	Right Wing	Second Team	8th nomination (6x First Team, 2x Second Team)
1967-68	Reg Kent	Center	First Team	1st nomination
1968-69	Dick Roberge	Coach	First Team	9th nomination (6x First Team Right Wing, 2x Second Team Right Wing, 1x Coach)
	Reg Kent	Center	First Team	2nd nomination (2x First Team)
	Galen Head	Right Wing	First Team	1st nomination
1972-73	Ted Lanyon	Defense	Second Team	1st nomination
1974-75	Ron Docken	Goaltender	Second Team	1st nomination
	Brian Coughlin	Right Defense	Second Team	1st nomination

Most All-Star appearances

Player	Appearances	Notes
Don Hall	9	
Dick Roberge	9	Includes one appearance as a coach
Dave Lucas	8	Includes one appearance as a coach
Steve Brklacich	4	Includes one appearance as a coach
Butch Martin	4	Includes one appearance as a coach. Only player in Jets' history to be named to EHL All-Star team under two positions
Ken Coombes	3	
Ken Laufman	2	
Reg Kent	2	
Ivan Wamsley	2	
