= Nancy Dowd =

American screenwriter

- Born: 1945 (age 80–81); Framingham, Massachusetts
- Education: Smith College; UCLA
- Occupation: Screenwriter
- Relatives: Ned Dowd (brother)
- Writing career
- Notable works: Slap Shot (1977); Coming Home (1978)

Nancy Dowd (born 1945) is an Academy Award-winning screenwriter whose credits include the films Slap Shot and Coming Home.

== Early life and education ==
Dowd was born in Framingham, Massachusetts, the daughter of a wealthy machine tool plant operator. She graduated from Smith College and spent her junior year at the Sorbonne. At Smith, she became friends with Molly Ivins, to whom she would later send copies of her screenplays for Ivins to read. After graduation, she taught English in Tokyo and worked for a time as a beer hall hostess. She later attended the UCLA Film School earning a master's degree, and worked as a student assistant to the director King Vidor.

== Career ==
Dowd's first screenplay, commissioned by Jane Fonda, was an antiwar story about a returning Vietnam War veteran titled "Buffalo Ghost." The script was turned over to Waldo Salt and was filmed as Coming Home. In a 1977 New York Times interview, Dowd called the new version of the screenplay "terrible."

Her brother Ned Dowd inspired the story behind Slap Shot based on his experiences playing minor league hockey. Ned and his wife, Nancy N. Dowd, both appeared in the film.

She wrote lyrics for a song used in Ladies and Gentlemen, The Fabulous Stains, another film she wrote.

Dowd often uses pseudonyms such as Rob Morton or Ernest Morton, or simply writes films without being officially credited.

== Filmography ==
- F.T.A. (1972) (Documentary)
- Slap Shot (1977)
- Coming Home (with Waldo Salt and Robert C. Jones) (1978)
- Straight Time (1978) (uncredited)
- North Dallas Forty (1979) (uncredited)
- Saturday Night Live (1980–1981) (TV)
- Ordinary People (1980) (uncredited)
- Ladies and Gentlemen, The Fabulous Stains (1982) (as "Rob Morton")
- Love (1982) (writer and director of segment "For Life")
- Cloak & Dagger (1984) (uncredited)
- Swing Shift (1984) (as "Rob Morton")
- White Nights (1985) (uncredited)
- Happy New Year (1987) (as "Warren Lane")
- Let It Ride (1989) (as "Ernest Morton")
