= Slap Shot =

1977 ice hockey film directed by George Roy Hill

- Theatrical release poster by Craig Nelson
- Directed by: George Roy Hill
- Written by: Nancy Dowd
- Produced by: Robert J. Wunsch; Stephen J. Friedman
- Starring: Paul Newman; Michael Ontkean; Lindsay Crouse; Jerry Houser; Jennifer Warren; Strother Martin
- Cinematography: Victor J. Kemper
- Edited by: Dede Allen
- Music by: Elmer Bernstein
- Production companies: Pan Arts; Kings Road Entertainment
- Distributed by: Universal Pictures
- Release date: February 25, 1977
- Running time: 123 minutes
- Country: United States
- Language: English
- Budget: $6 million
- Box office: $28 million

Slap Shot is a 1977 American Black Comedy Sports Film directed by George Roy Hill, written by Nancy Dowd, and starring Paul Newman and Michael Ontkean. It depicts a minor league ice hockey team that resorts to violent play to gain popularity in a factory town in decline.

Dowd based much of her script, as well as several of the characters, on experiences of her brother Ned Dowd, who played minor league hockey in the 1970s.

While Slap Shot received mixed reviews upon release and was only a moderate box-office success, it has since become widely regarded as a cult film.

== Plot ==
In the fictional Rust Belt city of Charlestown, Pennsylvania, (Note: The fictional Charlestown was inspired by Johnstown, where the movie was filmed) the impending closure of the steel mill, which will force layoffs of 10,000 workers, threatens the town's minor league ice hockey team. The Charlestown Chiefs is struggling with a losing season, incompetent players, and increasingly hostile spectators. Player-coach Reggie Dunlop and most of his players have no employment prospects outside hockey. As a money-saving measure, the team's penny-pinching manager, Joe McGrath, signs the young, immature Hanson Brothers.

After seeing Charlestown fans responding positively to violence, Dunlop unleashes the Hansons, who brutalize opposing teams with violent play and on-ice brawling. He also leaks a fabricated story about a potential sale to a community in Florida to motivate the team. Games devolve into bench-clearing brawls and Dunlop offers a $100 bounty to any player who assaults Tim McCracken, the player-coach of the rival Syracuse team.

The brawls boost attendance, and the Chiefs rise in the standing to become contenders for the league championship though Ned Braden, the team's top scorer, refuses to play violently. Dunlop attempts to get him to fight by exploiting his marital troubles and encourages Braden's wife Lily to leave him. Dunlop's estranged wife Francine wants a divorce and a job on Long Island. After Lily moves in with Dunlop to get away from Braden, Dunlop takes her to meet Francine, and the women commiserate over their difficulties in being married to hockey players.

Dunlop meets the reclusive team owner, Anita McCambridge, and learns his efforts to increase the team's popularity have been for naught, as McCambridge would make more money if she folded the team as a tax write-off. Dunlop decides to abandon the strategy of violence for the championship game, believing it to be his last, and the rest of the team agrees. Their opponents from Syracuse have stocked their team with violent "goons.” After the Chiefs are crushed during the first period while playing a non-violent style and getting booed by their fans, McGrath tells them that National Hockey League scouts, whom he invited, are watching the game.

Dunlop and the rest of the team, except Braden, switch back to brawling, much to the delight of the fans. When Braden sees Lily cheering for the Chiefs, he performs a striptease on the ice which breaks up the fights. When McCracken protests this "obscene" demonstration and sucker-punches the dismissive referee, Syracuse is disqualified and the Chiefs named champions.

Lily, Braden, and Dunlop ride in the backseat of a car during the Charlestown victory parade. Francine appears driving a loaded trailer, heading to a new life in New York. Dunlop runs to her car and tells her he's now the player-coach for a Minnesota team, intending to bring his teammates from the folded Chiefs with him, and inviting her to join him if New York doesn't work out. She drives away without replying, and when Dunlop returns to the car, assures Lily that she'll be joining him in Minnesota.

== Cast ==
- Paul Newman as Reggie Dunlop (#7)
- Strother Martin as Joe McGrath
- Michael Ontkean as Ned Braden (#10)
- Jennifer Warren as Francine Dunlop
- Lindsay Crouse as Lily Braden
- Jerry Houser as Dave "Killer" Carlson (#3)
- Jeff Carlson as Jeff Hanson (#18)
- Steve Carlson as Steve Hanson (#17)
- David Hanson as Jack Hanson (#16)
- Yvon Barrette as Denis Lemieux (#1)
- Allan Nicholls as Johnny Upton (#12)
- Brad Sullivan as Morris "Mo" Wanchuk (#2)
- Stephen Mendillo as Jim Ahern (#6)
- Yvan Ponton as Jean-Guy Drouin (#14)
- Matthew Cowles as Charlie
- Kathryn Walker as Anita McCambridge
- Melinda Dillon as Suzanne Hanrahan
- M. Emmet Walsh as Dickie Dunn
- Swoosie Kurtz as Shirley Upton
- Paul D'Amato as Tim "Dr. Hook" McCracken
- Ronald L. Docken as Lebrun (#30)
- Guido Tenesi as Billy Charlebois (#5)
- Jean Rosario Tetreault as Bergeron (#8)
- Christopher Murney as Tommy Hanrahan
- Blake Ball as Gilmore Tuttle
- Ned Dowd as Ogie Ogilthorpe
- Andrew Duncan as Jim Carr
- Nancy N. Dowd as Andrea
  - (Ned’s wife, not his screenwriter sister)
- Barbara L. Shorts as "Bluebird"
- Larry Block as Peterboro Referee
- Paul Dooley as Hyannisport Announcer
- Will Espey as Stickboy
- Rod Bloomfield as filmed skating scenes for Paul Newman
- Bruce Boudreau as Unnamed Hyannisport Player (#7)
- Galen Head as Unnamed Chiefs Player (#19)
- Susan Kendall Newman as Pharmacist
- Connie Madigan as Ross "Mad Dog" Madison
- Mark Bousquet as André "Poodle" Lussier
- John Gofton as Nick Brophy
- Rod Masters as Organist
- Joe Nolan as Clarence "Screaming Buffalo" Swamptown
- Dick Roberge as Referee Ecker
- Ray Schultz as Unnamed Bulldogs Player
- Carol Shelton as Fashion Show Commentator
- Ross Smith as Barclay Donaldson
- Steve Stirling as Unnamed Chiefs Player
- Cliff Thompson as Bus Driver Walt Comisky
- Janet Arters- Sparkle Twin
- Louise Arters- Sparkle Twin

== Development ==
The original screenplay by Nancy Dowd is based in part on her brother Ned Dowd's experiences playing minor-league hockey in the U.S. in the 1970s. At that time, violence, especially in the low minors, was a selling point of the game. Dowd would call his sister “from these various towns—Utica, Syracuse, New Haven—and tell me how he was being beaten-up and having his teeth knocked out.” That, she told The New York Times, “sort of fascinated me.”

Dowd was living in Los Angeles when she got a call from Ned, a member of the Johnstown Jets hockey team. He gave her the bad news that the team was up for sale. Dowd spent a month with his team doing research for a movie. She worked her own notes and from tape recordings that her brother had made for her in the locker room and on the team bus. She was paid $50,000 for the screenplay, which took four months to complete, and was present during the entire filming.

The movie was filmed in Johnstown, Pennsylvania, Pittsburgh, and in central New York State (Clinton Arena and Clinton, Oneida County; Utica Memorial Auditorium, Utica; Colgate University, Hamilton, Madison County and the Onondaga County War Memorial Auditorium, Syracuse).

Nancy Dowd used Ned and a number of his Johnstown Jets teammates in Slap Shot, with Ned playing Syracuse goon Ogie Ogilthorpe. He later used the role to launch a career as a Hollywood character actor, an assistant director, and eventually a line producer. The characters of the Hanson Brothers are based on three actual brothers: Jeff, Steve, and Jack Carlson, who played with Ned Dowd on the Jets. The character of Dave 'Killer' Carlson is based on then-Jets player Dave "Killer" Hanson. Steve and Jeff Carlson played their Hanson brother counterparts in the film. Jack Carlson originally was written to appear in the film as the third brother Jack, with Dave Hanson playing his film counterpart Dave 'Killer' Carlson. However, by the time filming began, Jack Carlson had been called up by the Edmonton Oilers, then of the WHA, to play in the WHA playoffs, so Dave Hanson moved into the role of Jack Hanson, and Jerry Houser was hired for the role of 'Killer' Carlson.

Paul Newman, claiming that he swore very little in real life before the making of Slap Shot, said to Time in 1984:

There's a hangover from characters sometimes. There are things that stick. Since Slap Shot, my language is right out of the locker room!

Newman stated that the most fun he ever had making a movie was on Slap Shot, as he had played the sport while young and was fascinated by the players around him. During the last decades of his life, he repeatedly called Reg Dunlop one of his favorite roles. Al Pacino wanted to play the role of Reggie Dunlop (#7) but director George Roy Hill chose Paul Newman instead.

Nancy Dowd rejected suggestions that the film was sexist and said that she considered herself to be a feminist.

== Production notes ==
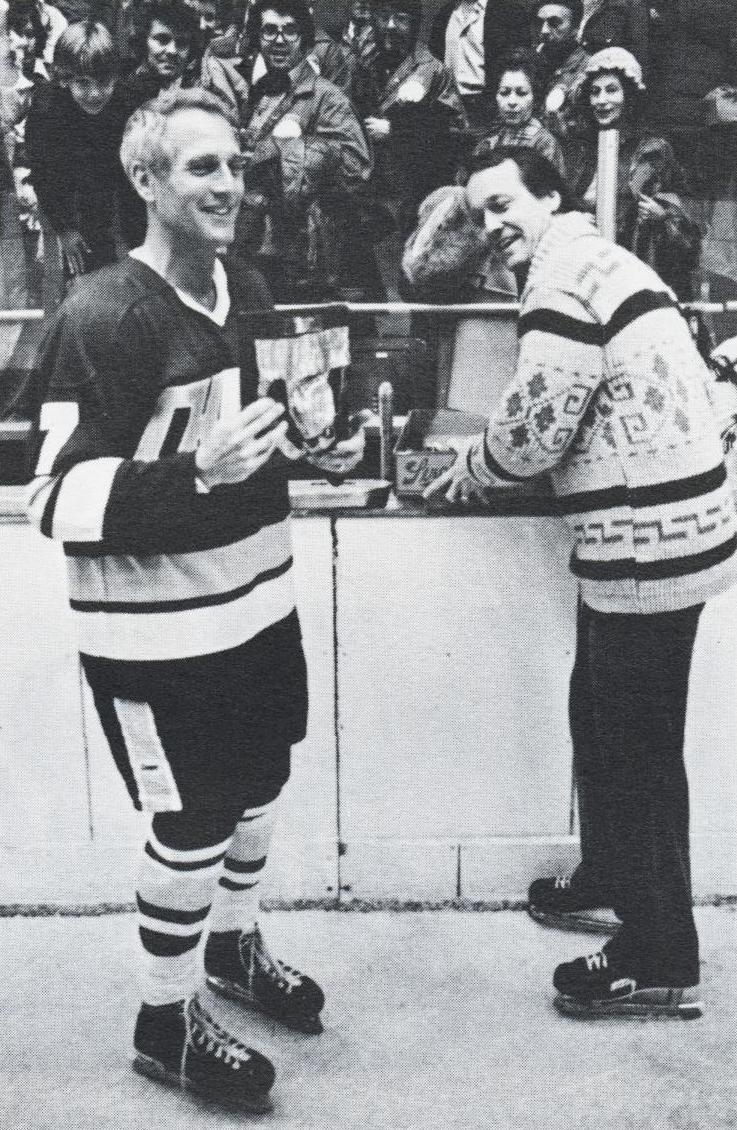
Actor Paul Newman and director George Roy Hill during production

Yvan Ponton and Yvon Barrette (who played forward Jean-Guy Drouin and goaltender Denis Lemieux, the two Quebec players in the film) dubbed their own voices for the film's translated French version. The film is one of few mainstream American films that was translated in colloquial Québécois French and not Standard French. Heavy use of Quebec expressions and foul language has made this version of the film a cult classic among French-speaking Canadians, where lines from the movie such as "Dave est magané" ("Dave's a mess") and "Du hockey comme dans l'temps" ("good old-fashioned hockey") are common catch phrases.

The movie was filmed in (and loosely based around) Johnstown, Pennsylvania, and used several players from the then-active North American Hockey League Johnstown Jets (the team for which Dowd himself played) as extras. The Carlson Brothers and Dave Hanson also played for the Jets in real life. Many scenes were filmed in the Cambria County War Memorial Arena and Starr Rink (Colgate University) in Hamilton, New York; the Utica Memorial Auditorium (used as Peterborough where the pre-game fight occurs and where a Hanson reprimands the referee for talking during the anthem); Onondaga County War Memorial (used as Hyannisport where the Hanson Brothers charge into the stands to accost a fan and are arrested); and in other Johnstown locales. Coincidentally, the Johnstown Jets and the NAHL folded in 1977, the year Slap Shot was released.

Although much of the film takes place during the fall and winter seasons, when hockey is in season, filming at the Utica Memorial Auditorium took place from June 3–4. Similarly, in Johnstown, Newman is wearing a coat as though it should be cold, but there is no snow on the ground and the trees are in full bloom.

The Reggie Dunlop character is based, in part, on former Eastern Hockey League Long Island Ducks player/coach John Brophy, who receives homage by his last name being used for the drunken center of the Hyannisport Presidents. Coincidentally, Brophy would later coach Dave Hanson, who played Jack Hanson, with the Birmingham Bulls in 1978.

In one scene announcer Jim Carr remarks that Ned Braden is "a college graduate ... and an American citizen!" – both unusual distinctions for a pro hockey player of the time. In real life, Michael Ontkean is Canadian, but played hockey for and graduated from the University of New Hampshire in 1970.

Syracuse Bulldogs rookie goon Ogie Ogilthorpe, who was mentioned throughout the film but never actually seen until the final playoff game, was based on longtime minor-league goon Bill "Goldie" Goldthorpe. Like Ogie Ogilthorpe, Goldie Goldthorpe is also infamous for his rookie season in professional hockey (1973) when as a member of the Syracuse Blazers he amassed 25 major fighting penalties before Christmas.

The Broome County Blades in the film were based on the Broome Dusters. One scene was specifically drawn from events that occurred in Binghamton, New York. In the film the Hanson brothers wear black-rimmed, Coke-bottle eyeglasses, and in one game get into a fight immediately after the opening faceoff; in reality, both Jeff and Steve Carlson did wear that style of glasses, and did indeed get into a long fight right after an opening faceoff. Coach Dick Roberge:

We got into Binghamton about two or three weeks before the playoffs. In the team warmup, we're out there and all the Binghamton players came out with the plastic glasses and big noses, every one of them, poking fun at the Carlson brothers. We went back in the dressing room and the boys said, "Coach, as soon as that puck is dropped, we're pairing up." We had one heckuva fight. They went about 30 minutes until everyone got tired. We met them again in the [1974 –75 season] finals and beat them four straight.

— Johnstown Tribune-Democrat, as related by Coach Dick Roberge

A scene in the film shows the Hanson brothers jumping the Peterborough Patriots during pre-game warm-ups. This is based on events in a mid-'70s North American Hockey League playoff series between the Johnstown Jets and the Buffalo Norsemen. The Jets had a black player on their roster, and during a playoff game held in North Tonawanda, New York (a northern suburb of Buffalo where the Norsemen played their home games), a Norsemen fan held up a derogatory sign stating that blacks should be playing basketball. The next game in the series was held in Johnstown, and the Jets retaliated by attacking the Norsemen players during the warm-ups, with a huge brawl erupting. The Norsemen players and coaches then returned to the dressing room and refused to come out to start the game. The game was awarded to the Jets by forfeit, as was the playoff series since the "win" gave the Jets the needed number of victories to capture the series.

Another scene is also based on a real-life event. In the film Jeff Hanson scores a goal and is hit in the face by a set of keys thrown by a fan. The Hansons then go into the stands after the fan and Jeff Hanson punches the wrong fan. After the game the Hansons are arrested for the incident. In real life a similar incident occurred in Utica, New York, in a game between the Johnstown Jets and the Mohawk Valley Comets. Jeff Carlson was hit in the face by a cup of ice thrown by a Utica fan and went into the stands after the fan with brothers Jack and Steve. All three were arrested and Dave Hanson gathered the money for bail for the Carlson brothers.

== Reception ==
Slap Shot was a moderate hit upon release, grossing $28,000,000 during its theater run, which placed it at #21 among movies released in 1977 and well below the receipts of Paul Newman's three previous wide-release films: The Towering Inferno, The Sting and Butch Cassidy and the Sundance Kid, which all grossed over $100 million.

Reviews were mixed and ranged from Rex Reed writing in The Daily News that it was “violent, bloody and thoroughly revolting,” to Newsweek's assertion that the film was “tough, smart, cynical and sentimental—the key ingredients in our new pop populism.”

Variety wrote that "director George Roy Hill is ambivalent on the subject of violence in professional ice hockey. Half the time Hill invites the audience to get off on the mayhem, the other half of the time he decries it. You can't really have it both ways and this compromise badly mars the handsomely made Universal release, produced by Robert Wunsch and Stephen Friedman." Vincent Canby of The New York Times described the performances as "impeccable" and thought the film had "a kind of vitality to it” but found it "unfunny" and noted an "ambiguous" point of view with regard to violence.

Kevin Thomas of the Los Angeles Times was negative, writing that since the "characters possess so little dimension and since we have so little opportunity to get to know and therefore care about them, their incessantly brutalizing behavior and talk can only seem exploitative in effect. What's more, in playing for laughs, Slap Shot gives the nasty impression of seeming to patronize both the players and their fans." Gary Arnold of The Washington Post wrote "Slap Shot comes at you like a boisterous drunk. At first glance it appears harmlessly funny in an extravagantly foul-mouthed sort of way. However, there's a mean streak beneath the cartoon surface that makes one feel uneasy about humoring this particular drunk for too long." Tom Milne of The Monthly Film Bulletin described it as "a film which, while deploring the incidence of violence in sport, does everything it possibly can to make the audience wallow in that violence."

Gene Siskel gave the film two-and-a-half stars out of four in his original print review, writing that "what Slap Shot does to its ultimate failure is exaggerate every one of its fine facets. It's as if those locker room tape recordings had been edited to remove the silences and banalities to include only the most outrageous sex-and-violence. And regrettably, 'Slap Shot' moralizes about violence in its tacked-on, whipsaw ending. This, after filling the screen with nonstop mayhem." Years later he said, "My initial review was mixed and then I saw it two weeks later, thankfully, and I knew it was a terrific film." He included it among the runners-up on his year-end list of the 10 best films of 1977, explaining that "the more I saw it, the more I liked it."

The Wall Street Journal's Joy Gould Boyum seemed at once entertained and repulsed by a movie so "foul-mouthed and unabashedly vulgar" on one hand and so "vigorous and funny" on the other. Michael Ontkean's strip tease displeased Time's critic Richard Schickel, who regretted that "in the dénouement [Ontkean] is forced to go for a broader, cheaper kind of comic response." Despite the mixed reviews, the film won the Hochi Film Award for Best International Film.

Pauline Kael in The New Yorker was mixed, writing that "I don't know that I've ever seen a picture so completely geared to giving the public 'what it wants' with such an antagonistic feeling behind it. Hill gets you laughing, all right but he's so grimly determined to ram entertainment down your throat that you feel like a Strasbourg goose." However, she praised Newman for giving "the performance of his life—to date."

== Legacy ==
Steve Carlson #17
(@Hanson_Brothers)
tweeted:

It has been brought to our attention that the broken cd of #SlapShot was found at the wreck of the #HumboltStrong team bus. We wish "putting on the foil or "buying a soda after the game" could help but instead we will reflect and pray God gives peace and comfort during this time.

9 April 2018

In the years since its initial release, Slap Shot has come to be regarded as a cult classic.

Critical reevaluation of the film continues to be positive. In 1998, Maxim named Slap Shot the "Best Guy Movie of All Time" above acknowledged classics such as The Godfather, Raging Bull, and Newman's own Cool Hand Luke. Entertainment Weekly ranked the film #30 on its list of "The Top 50 Cult Films". In the November 2007 issue of GQ, Dan Jenkins proclaimed Slap Shot "the best sports film of the past 50 years."

On Rotten Tomatoes, the film has a rating of 87%, based on 38 reviews, with an average rating of 7.10/10 and the critical consensus stating "Raunchy, violent, and very funny, Slap Shot is ultimately set apart by a wonderful comic performance by Paul Newman." Metacritic, which uses a weighted average, assigned the film a score of 61 out of 100, based on 9 critics, indicating "generally favorable" reviews.

The film is standard viewing for young ice hockey players on road trips, including Christian Hanson, son of David Hanson, who saw the film for the first time when he was 11 years old during a hockey road trip with his team. After the Humboldt Broncos bus crash in 2018, a broken Slap Shot DVD was found at the crash site. Steve Carlson met with some of the survivors.

The film directly inspired the name of the Boston hardcore band Slapshot.

Canadian punk rock group The Hanson Brothers was named after the film’s fictional brothers. The band members adopted “Hanson” stage name, wore eyeglasses like the film’s Hanson brothers and wrote songs about ice hockey and beer.

== Novelization ==
Concurrent with the release of the film, Berkeley Books released a novelization of the screenplay, written by Richard Woodley.

== Sequels ==
The film was followed by two direct-to video sequels: Slap Shot 2: Breaking the Ice (2002) and Slap Shot 3: The Junior League (2008). Paul Newman and the rest of the original cast did not participate in either sequel, with the exception of the Hanson Brothers, who had major roles in both.

== See also ==
- List of films about ice hockey
