= Steve Carlson =

American ice hockey player (born 1955)

- Born: August 26, 1955 (age 70) Virginia, Minnesota, U.S.
- Height: 6 ft 3 in (191 cm)
- Weight: 185 lb (84 kg; 13 st 3 lb)
- Position: Center
- Shot: Left
- Played for: Los Angeles Kings; New England Whalers; Minnesota Fighting Saints; Edmonton Oilers
- NHL draft: 131st overall, 1975; Detroit Red Wings
- WHA draft: 73rd overall, 1974; Minnesota Fighting Saints
- Playing career: 1973–1987

Steven Edward Carlson (born August 26, 1955) is an American former professional ice hockey forward and a former minor league hockey coach. He played in the World Hockey Association from 1975 to 1979 and the National Hockey League during the 1979–80 season. He also appeared in the movie Slap Shot as one of the three Hanson Brothers.

== Biography ==
Carlson was born in Virginia, Minnesota. He appeared in the movie Slap Shot as one of the three Hanson Brothers, who were based on Carlson and his brothers and teammates. Carlson played in the World Hockey Association with the New England Whalers, Edmonton Oilers and Minnesota Fighting Saints and in the National Hockey League for the Los Angeles Kings, scoring nine goals for the Kings. While playing for the Edmonton Oilers in the WHA, he was the roommate of Wayne Gretzky during his rookie season. Carlson is one of six players to ever be on a team with Gordie Howe and a team with Wayne Gretzky.

Since retiring from hockey, Carlson has run a power skating school in Johnstown, PA. He and his brothers also make numerous public appearances, primarily at hockey-related events and charities, as their Hanson Brothers characters. The trio also appeared in two sequels to Slap Shot, Slap Shot 2: Breaking the Ice, 2002 and Slap Shot 3: The Junior League, 2008.

On October 4, 2021, Carlson was diagnosed with Stage IV metastatic Squamous Cell Carcinoma.

== Career statistics ==
=== Regular season and playoffs ===
			Regular season					Playoffs
Season	Team	League	GP	G	A	Pts	PIM	GP	G	A	Pts	PIM
1973–74	Marquette Iron Rangers	USHL	54	30	49	79	72	12	4	4	8	5
1974–75	Johnstown Jets	NAHL	70	30	58	88	84	12	6	4	10	39
1975–76	Minnesota Fighting Saints	WHA	10	0	1	1	23	—	—	—	—	—
1975–76	Johnstown Jets	NAHL	40	22	24	46	55	9	5	4	9	6
1976–77	Minnesota Fighting Saints	WHA	21	5	8	13	8	—	—	—	—	—
1976–77	New England Whalers	WHA	31	4	9	13	40	5	0	0	0	9
1977–78	New England Whalers	WHA	38	6	7	13	11	13	2	7	9	2
1977–78	Springfield Indians	AHL	37	21	15	36	46	—	—	—	—	—
1978–79	Edmonton Oilers	WHA	73	18	22	40	50	11	1	1	2	12
1979–80	Los Angeles Kings	NHL	52	9	12	21	23	4	1	1	2	12
1980–81	Houston Apollos	CHL	27	13	21	34	29	—	—	—	—	—
1980–81	Springfield Indians	AHL	32	10	14	24	44	7	2	2	4	39
1981–82	Nashville South Stars	CHL	59	23	39	62	63	—	—	—	—	—
1982–83	Birmingham South Stars	CHL	69	25	42	67	73	9	1	4	5	4
1983–84	Baltimore Skipjacks	AHL	63	9	30	39	70	10	7	3	10	8
1984–85	Baltimore Skipjacks	AHL	76	18	29	47	69	15	2	6	8	4
1985–86	Baltimore Skipjacks	AHL	66	9	27	36	56	—	—	—	—	—
1986–87	Baltimore Skipjacks	AHL	67	12	13	25	32	—	—	—	—	—
WHA totals			173	33	47	80	132	29	3	8	11	23
NHL totals			52	9	12	21	23	4	1	1	2	7

== Coaching career ==
Season	Team	League	Position	Games	Wins	Losses	Ties	Overtime Losses	Playoff Result
1986–87	Baltimore Skipjacks	AHL	Assistant coach	80	35	37	0	8	Out of Playoffs
1987–88	Baltimore Skipjacks	AHL	Assistant coach	80	13	58	9	0	Out of Playoffs
1988–89	Johnstown Chiefs	ECHL	Head coach	60	32	22	0	6	Lost in Finals
1989–90	Johnstown Chiefs	ECHL	Head coach	60	23	31	0	6	Did not make playoffs
1990–91	Johnstown Chiefs	ECHL	Head coach	64	32	29	0	3	Lost in the Second Round
1991–92	Johnstown Chiefs	ECHL	Head coach	64	36	23	0	5	Lost in the Second Round
1992–93	Memphis Riverkings	CHL	Head coach	60	26	27	7	0	Lost in the First Round
2007–08	Kenosha Thunder (High School)	WIAA	Head coach	20	8	12	1		Lost in the First Round

== Transactions ==
- Selected by Minnesota Fighting Saints, 7th round, #102 overall 1974 WHA Amateur Draft.
- Selected by Detroit Red Wings, 8th round, #131 overall 1975 NHL Amateur Draft.
- Traded to Edmonton (WHA) by Minnesota (WHA) with Mike Antonovich, Bill Butters, Jack Carlson, Dave Keon, Jean-Louis Levasseur and John McKenzie, January 1977.
- Traded to New England (WHA) by Edmonton (WHA) with Jack Carlson, Dave Dryden, Dave Keon, and John McKenzie for future considerations (Dave Debol, June 1977), Dan Arndt and cash, January 1977.

== Awards and Accomplishments ==
1999, PIHL Championship (Head Coach, Bishop McCort High School)
2026, Inducted into Cambria County Sports Hall of Fame

== Hockey Cards ==
Year	Card	Set Name
1982–83	6	Birmingham South Stars [CHL]
1989–90	36	Johnstown Chiefs - Sheetz/Big League Cards [ECHL]
1991–92	1	Johnstown Chiefs [ECHL] (Coach)

== See also ==
- List of NHL players

Preceded by Joe Selenski	Head coaches of the Johnstown Chiefs; 1988-1992	Succeeded by Ed Johnstone
