= Jeff Carlson (ice hockey) =

American ice hockey player (born 1953)

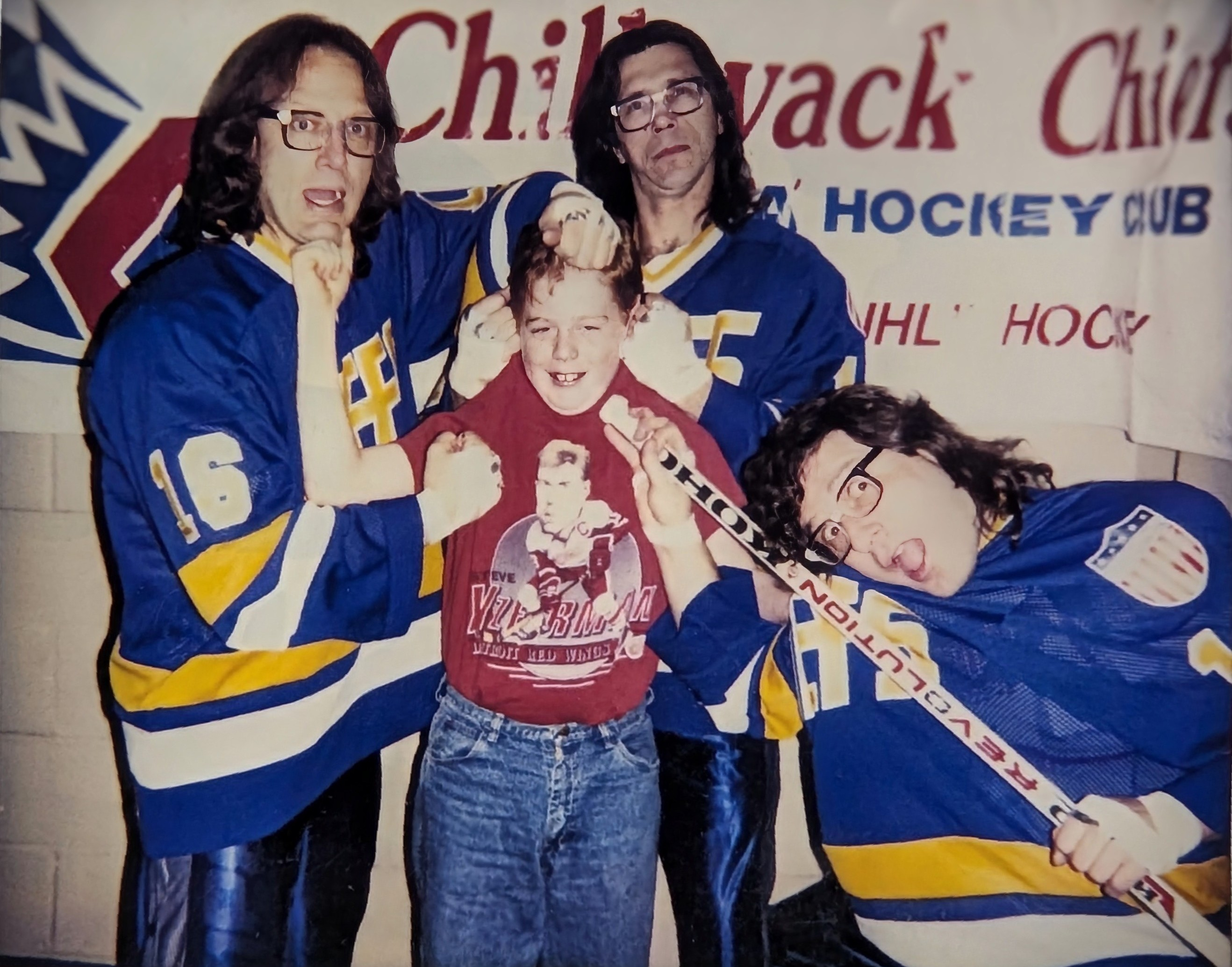
- Carlson (right) in 1998 photo with fan
- Born: July 20, 1953 (age 73) Virginia, Minnesota, U.S.
- Height: 6 ft 3 in (191 cm)
- Weight: 209 lb (95 kg; 14 st 13 lb)
- Position: Right wing
- Shot: Right
- Played for: Minnesota Fighting Saints
- NHL draft: Undrafted
- Playing career: 1973–1983

Jeffery Lee Carlson (born July 20, 1953) is a former professional American ice hockey forward.

== Career ==
Carlson is best known for his role in the movie Slap Shot as one of the Hanson Brothers. Carlson also played in the World Hockey Association with the Minnesota Fighting Saints along with stints in several other professional leagues, including the International Hockey League’s Muskegon Mohawks. In total, he played nine seasons of professional hockey.As of 2025 Carlson is a Chief Executive Officer at MetaVista3D, and a director at Future Tech Now Corporation.

== Regular season ==
Season	Team	League	GP	G	A	Pts	PIM
1973–74	Marquette Iron Rangers	USHL	55	25	39	64	170
1974–75	Johnstown Jets	NAHL	64	15	32	47	250
1975–76	Johnstown Jets	NAHL	55	27	20	47	160
1975–76	Minnesota Fighting Saints	WHA	7	0	1	1	14
1976–77	Greensboro Generals	SHL	21	11	1	12	61
1976–77	Hampton Gulls	SHL	1	1	0	1	0
1976–77	Mohawk Valley Comets	NAHL	17	4	7	11	40
1977–78	Phoenix Roadrunners	PHL	41	19	27	46	65
1977–78	Springfield Indians	AHL	4	0	0	0	4
1978–79	Phoenix Roadrunners	PHL	56	13	16	29	156
1979–80	Muskegon Mohawks	IHL	76	26	25	51	187
1980–81	Muskegon Mohawks	IHL	60	12	23	35	153
1980–81	Fort Wayne Komets	IHL	14	3	5	8	12
1981–82	Muskegon Mohawks	IHL	62	16	26	42	124
1982–83	Muskegon Mohawks	IHL	5	0	0	0	0
Major Leagues	WHA career totals (1 seasons)		7	0	1	1	14

== Background ==
Jeff Carlson was born in Virginia, Minnesota along with his two brothers Steve and Jack. The brothers first played together on the Marquette Iron Rangers hockey team in Marquette, Michigan. Jeff Carlson also played in the World Hockey Association with the Minnesota Fighting Saints. He too was also known for "dropping the gloves."

Before being signed to the Minnesota Fighting Saints, Jeff and his brothers attended their training camp where all of them were told to gain more playing experience before the Saints would officially sign them. Thus, Jeff and his brothers drove to Marquette, signed, gained experience, and then moved on to play for the Fighting Saints.

== Rise to fame ==
The Hanson Brothers characters from the hockey movie Slap Shot are recognized in sports film history. Jeff, who played "Jeff Hanson" in the film, is described as part of a unit that traveled to participate in the sport and meet audiences. Jeff had a career as a professional hockey player; during this time, he and his two costars lived in three separate cities. Jeff periodically reunited with the others for fan events. Jeff and the other actors appeared in sequels to Slap Shot and continued to represent their characters and the films.
