= Live in China =

Live album by Godiego
- Released: December 25, 1980
- Genre: Rock
- Label: Nippon Columbia

Godiego chronology
Magic Capsule (1979)	Live in China (1980)	Heiwa Kumikyoku (1984)

Live in China (中国 后醍醐, Chūgoku Godaigo; pinyin: Zhōngguó Hòutíhú) is Godiego's second live album. It is a recording of Godiego's concert in Tianjin, China. The concert was the first rock concert performed in China, and it was broadcast simultaneously in China and Japan on January 1, 1981. The album cover was specially designed with yellow text on a red background, with all credits and song titles written in simplified Chinese. "Godiego" was even written as 后醍醐. Most of the songs were performed in English, with some songs partially in Japanese and others partially in Mandarin. Godiego also performed "Gandhara" (ガンダーラ, Gandāra; 犍陀罗), "The Road of Silk and Spice" (シルク・アンド・スパイス, Shiruku Ando Supaisu; 丝绸与香料之路), "Pomp and Circumstances" (組曲:威風堂々, Kumikyoku: Ifū Dōdō; 組曲:威风堂堂), and "Happiness" (ハピネス, Hapinesu; 幸福) in Tianjin, but these songs did not make the album cut.

== Track listing ==
All lyrics are written by Yōko Narahashi unless otherwise noted, all arrangement by Mickey Yoshino; all music is composed by Yukihide Takekawa unless otherwise noted.

Side A
No.	Title	Lyrics	Music	Language	Length
1.	"The Birth of the Odyssey" (ザ・バース・オヴ・ジ・オデッセイ Za Bāsu Ovu Ji Odessei, 序曲 Xù Qū)	Yōko Narahashi	Mickie Yoshino	Instrumental	1:01
2.	"Steppin' into Your World" (ステッピン・イントゥ・ユア・ワールド Suteppin Intu Yua Wārudo, 同作冒险旅行 Tóng Zuò Màoxiǎn Lǚxíng)	Y. Narahashi	M. Yoshino	English	5:53
3.	"Monkey Magic" (モンキー・マジック Monkī Majikku, 猿猴魔术 Yuánhóu Móshù)	Y. Narahashi	Yukihide Takekawa	English	3:23
4.	"Namaste" (ナマステ Namasute, 你好 Nǐhǎo)	Y. Narahashi	Y. Takekawa	English	4:20
5.	"A Promise in Tianjin" (ニー・ハオ・天津 Nī Hao Tenshin, 在天津的誓言 Zài Tiānjīn De Shìyán)	Y. Narahashi	Y. Takekawa	English & Mandarin	3:48
6.	"Portopia" (ポートピア Pōtopia, 理想之港 Lǐxiǎng Zhī Gǎng)	Y. Narahashi & Akira Itō	Y. Takekawa	Japanese	7:39

Side B
No.	Title	Lyrics	Music	Language	Length
7.	"Beautiful Name" (ビューティフル・ネーム Byūtifuru Nēmu, 漂亮的名字 Piàoliang De Míngzi)	Y. Narahashi & A. Itō	Y. Takekawa	English, Japanese, & Mandarin	8:34
8.	"Kathmandu" (（カミング・トゥゲザー・イン）カトマンズ (Kamingu Tugezā In) Katomanzu, 加德满都 Jiā Dé Mǎn Dōu)	Y. Narahashi & Takashi Matsumoto	Y. Takekawa	Japanese & English	5:33
9.	"Wave Good-Bye" (ウェイヴ・グッドバイ Weivu Guddobai, 擇手告別 Zé Shǒu Gào Bié)	Y. Narahashi	Y. Takekawa	English	4:30
10.	"Celebration" (セレブレイション Serebureishon, 庆祝典礼 Qìngzhù Diǎnlǐ)	Y. Narahashi	Y. Takekawa	English	5:42
