= Holy and Bright =

Single by Godiego
- Released: October 1, 1979
- Genre: Rock
- Label: Nippon Columbia
- Songwriters: Yoko Narahashi, Michio Yamagami, Yukihide Takekawa, Mickie Yoshino
- Producers: Johnny Nomura, Godiego

Godiego singles chronology
"The Galaxy Express 999" (1979)	"Holy and Bright" (1979)	"Return to Africa" (1980)

"Holy and Bright" (ホーリー&ブライト, Hōrī Ando Buraito) is a song by Japanese rock band Godiego, serving as the band's 12th single. "Holy and Bright" was used as the ending theme for the television drama Saiyūki(Season 2), known in the west as Monkey, and ultimately reached number 17 on the Oricon and number 8 on The Best Ten's charts.

== Chart performance ==
- Oricon Weekly Chart: Peaked at 17th place.

- Oricon Annual Chart (1980): Ranked 94th place.

- The Best Ten Chart: Reached 8th place.

== Track listing ==
1. "Holy and Bright" (ホーリー&ブライト, Hōrī Ando Buraito; Japanese Version)
- Lyrics: Michio Yamagami, Yoko Narahashi / Music: Yukihide Takekawa / Arrangement: Mickey Yoshino
1. "Holy and Bright" (English Version)
- Lyrics: Yoko Narahashi / Music: Yukihide Takekawa / Arrangement: Mickey Yoshino

== Personnel ==
- Takekawa Yukihide - Vocals
- Mickey Yoshino - Keyboard
- Takayoshi Asano - guitar
- Steve Fox - Bass
- Tommy Snyder - Drums

== See also ==
- 1979 in Japanese music
