= Kimi wa Bara yori Utsukushī =

Single by Akira Fuse

from the album Survival: Ai Aru Kagiri Kimi wa Utsukushī
- Language: Japanese
- B-side: "C'est la Vie (Jinsei Nante Sonna Mono sa)"
- Released: January 17, 1979
- Genre: Kayōkyoku
- Length: 3:42
- Label: King
- Composer: Mickie Yoshino
- Lyricist: Kenji Kadoya

Akira Fuse singles chronology
"Meguri Ai Tsumuide" (1978)	"Kimi wa Bara yori Utsukushī" (1979)	"Koi no Survival" (1979)

Official audio
- "Kimi wa Bara yori Utsukushī" on YouTube

"Kimi wa Bara yori Utsukushī" (Japanese: 君は薔薇より美しい; lit. 'You're More Beautiful Than a Rose') (Japanese pronunciation: [kimi wa baɾa yoɾi ɯtsɯ̥kɯɕiꜜː]) is a song by Japanese singer Akira Fuse from his ninth studio album, Survival: Ai Aru Kagiri Kimi wa Utsukushī (1979). Written by lyricist Kenji Kadoya and composer Mickie Yoshino, it was released through King Records on January 17, 1979, as Fuse's 42nd single. A light pop ballad, its lyrics are about a man who reunites with a woman he says has changed to be more beautiful than a rose.

== Background and release ==
As a high schooler, after giving a passing audition on a television music program, the Japanese singer Akira Fuse was scouted by Watanabe Productions and made his solo debut in 1975 through King Records with the single "Kimi ni Namida to Hohoemi o", a Japanese version of the Italian "Se piangi, se ridi" (1965). Fuse became a popular singer in Japan, and his single 1975 single "Cyclamen no Kahori" sold over a million copies and won the Grand Prix at the Japan Record Awards.

Within the latter half of the 1970s, rival cosmetics companies Shiseido and Kanebo ran competing advertisement campaigns centered on commercial jingles. Though the start of the decade had seen focus on slogans and models, Shiseido transitioned to music-based advertising in 1975, and Kanebo followed suit the year after. In 1978, Shiseido's "Jikan yo, Tomare" by Eikichi Yazawa and Kanebo's "Mister Summertime (Natsu Monogatari)" by Circus both achieved first place on the Oricon Singles Chart.

"Kimi wa Bara yori Utsukushī" was released by King Records on January 17, 1979. It was used as the jingle in Kanebo's 1979 spring campaign, with the song's title doubling as its slogan. (Note: Differentiating the associated campaign slogan from the song, the former spells the word kimi (lit. 'you') in hiragana as きみ, whereas the latter uses the kanji form 君.) That year, in what kayōkyoku journalist Hideki Hamaguchi described as the "Rose War", Shiseido primarily promoted their campaign through the film Lady Oscar (known as the Rose of Versailles in Japan) and starred the lead actress Catriona MacColl in commercials. To compete, Kanebo's commercials featured British-Argentine actress Olivia Hussey, who had gained recognition in Japan for her role in Romeo and Juliet (1968). Following the release of "Kimi wa Bara yori Utsukushī", Fuse and Hussey began dating upon the latter's visit to Japan; they married in 1980, but divorced in 1989.

== Composition and reception ==
"Kimi wa Bara yori Utsukushī"
The final chorus to "Kimi wa Bara yori Utsukushī". It is a light ballad and pop song. Lyrically, Fuse sings of a woman who has changed to be more beautiful than a rose, ending with the word kawatta (lit. 'changed') in high note.

"Kimi wa Bara yori Utsukushī" was composed and arranged by Mickie Yoshino of Godiego, who previously performed Kanebo's 1977 summer campaign song "Salad Girl". Kenji Kadoya wrote the song's lyrics. Fellow Godiego member Takami Asano arranged the B-side "C'est la Vie (Jinsei Nante Sonna Mono sa)", which features lyrics and composition written by Fuse. Musically, "Kimi wa Bara yori Utsukushī" is a light and cheerful ballad and pop song for the spring season, demonstrating elements of Yoshino's musical style. Opening with a brass intro, the songs moves to an odd time signature with the chorus, and ends with Fuse singing the word kawatta (lit. 'changed') in high note. Lyrically, the song is set from the perspective of a man who meets a woman he hasn't seen for a long time, and sings that she has changed to be more beautiful than a rose.

Though Fuse's popularity had waned in 1977–78, "Kimi wa Bara yori Utsukushī" was commercially successful. It sold circa 400,000 copies in Japan according to Sports Nippon and reached number eight on the Oricon Singles Chart, Fuse's first top ten entry since the number-one "Ochiba ga Yuki ni" (1976). Based on factors of sales, airplay, and music TV program rankings, Sports Nippon ranked it as the sixth most-popular song of April 1979. The newspaper's staff wrote that there were "probably no women who didn't feel excited when [sung] that [they're more beautiful than a rose]" by Fuse, the "king of ballads". Writers for Oricon and CDJournal highlighted Fuse's vocals: CDJournal reviewers thought his singing style was pop transformed into soul music, and writers for Oricon described the kawatta high notes as a highlight of the song. Alongside the follow-up single "Koi no Survival" – a Japanese cover of the English-language "I Will Survive" (1978) – "Kimi wa Bara yori Utsukushī" was released on Fuse's ninth album Survival: Ai Aru Kagiri Kimi wa Utsukushī (1979; lit. 'Survival: As Long As There Is Love, You Are Beautiful').

Retrospectively, "Kimi wa Bara yori Utsukushī" has been named amongst Fuse's most representative songs in profiles by Oricon and Excite Japan. In the 2010s, the song saw contemporary attention on radio airplay, charting three weeks on Billboard Japan's adult contemporary chart with a peak at number 80. The song's official audio, uploaded to YouTube by Fuse's mangagement, includes timestamps to the kawatta high notes in its description, accompanied by the text "for busy people" (忙しい人向け, isogashī hito muke). Stemming from a post on X (formerly Twitter), the timestamps resulted in renewed viral attention to the song on Japanese social media in 2024.

== Live performances and other appearances ==
Fuse performed "Kimi wa Bara yori Utsukushī" on December 31, 1979, at the 30th Kōhaku Uta Gassen, an annual New Year's Eve television special produced by NHK. Performing as a member of the White Team, it was his 13th appearance at the event.

A jazz version was recorded for Fuse's compilation album 55th Anniversary Special Album in 2021.

== Track listing ==
"Kimi wa Bara yori Utsukushī" — CD single
No.	Title	Writer(s)	Length
1.	"Kimi wa Bara yori Utsukushī" (君は薔薇より美しい, lit. "You're More Beautiful Than a Rose")	Kenji Kadoya; Mickie Yoshino	3:42

"Kimi wa Bara yori Utsukushī" — vinyl single (B-side)
No.	Title	Writer(s)	Length
2.	"C'est la Vie (Jinsei Nante Sonna Mono sa)" (セ・ラ・ヴィ～人生なんてそんなものさ～, Se Ra Vī (Jinsei Nante Sonna Mono sa), lit. "C'est la Vie (That's Life)")	Akira Fuse; Takami Asano	3:54
Total length:			7:36

== Charts ==
Weekly chart performance for "Kimi wa Bara yori Utsukushī" (1979)
Chart (1979)	Peak position
Japan (Oricon)	8

Weekly chart performance for "Kimi wa Bara yori Utsukushī" (2013)
Chart (2013)	Peak position
Japanese Adult Contemporary (Billboard Japan)	80
