= The Youth Killer =

- Film poster
- Directed by: Kazuhiko Hasegawa
- Screenplay by: Tsutomu Tamura
- Based on: Snakelust by Kenji Nakagami
- Produced by: Shōhei Imamura; Kano Otsuka
- Starring: Yutaka Mizutani; Mieko Harada; Etsuko Ichihara; Ryōhei Uchida; Kazuko Shirakawa
- Cinematography: Tatsuo Suzuki
- Edited by: Sachiko Yamaji
- Music by: Mickie Yoshino; Godiego
- Production companies: Art Theatre Guild; Imamura Productions; Soei-sha
- Distributed by: Art Theatre Guild
- Release date: October 23, 1976 (Japan)
- Running time: 132 minutes 115 minutes (re-edited version)
- Country: Japan
- Language: Japanese

The Youth Killer (Japanese: 青春の殺人者, Hepburn: Seishun no satsujinsha) is a 1976 Japanese crime drama film directed by Kazuhiko Hasegawa in his directorial debut, with a screenplay by Tsutomu Tamura. It is an adaptation of the short story Snakelust (Ja'in) by Kenji Nakagami, which itself was based on a real life patricide that occurred in Ichihara. The film's story is a study of alienation focusing on a young killer, starring Yutaka Mizutani in the lead role, in addition to Mieko Harada, Etsuko Ichihara, Ryōhei Uchida and Kazuko Shirakawa. Shinji Sōmai was an assistant director on the production (under the pseudonym Jiro Sugita), while Shōhei Imamura was the film's co-producer and Hideyuki Hirayama served as a production manager. Mickie Yoshino and Japanese rock band Godiego composed the film's soundtrack. The Youth Killer was theatrically released by Art Theatre Guild on October 23, 1976, in Japan, where it was critically acclaimed, winning five categories at the Kinema Junpo Best Ten Awards including Best Film.

== Plot ==
Jun Saiki is 22 years old. He has run the family snack bar in Chiba Prefecture for a few months, with the assistance of his doting yet stifling parents. He is in a relationship with his co-worker and childhood friend Keiko Tsuneyota, who his parents disapprove of.

One day, Jun returns to his parents' home to retrieve his car, which they took without permission. Upon arrival, his father confronts him. Jun becomes enraged when his father criticizes Keiko and tells him that he will have to quit the snack bar if he doesn't break up with her. Jun stabs his father to death with a kitchen knife. He decides to turn himself in to the police, but his mother stops him. Eerily calm after the shock, she suggests that they dispose of the body and then move to another place where no one will know them. However, when Jun tries to move the body out of the house, his mother suddenly changes moods again and takes the knife from her son. She attempts suicide, and in the ensuing struggle to disarm her, Jun kills her as well.

Returning to the bar, Jun tells Keiko that he had a big fight with his parents and that he's closing the bar for the day. He drives Keiko home before bidding her farewell and leaving. Returning to his parents' house late at night, Jun wraps his parents' bodies in blankets and ties them up with rope. Keiko arrives and finds the bodies. However, she never liked Jun's parents and had already suspected him of murder. Keiko helps Jun clean the blood-stained bathroom. Afterwards, they load the bodies into their car and head to the port before dawn, where they attach weights to the two bodies and dispose of them.

A few hours after a drive with Keiko, Jun is eating a popsicle at the beach when he is moved to tears by the memories of the time he spent with his parents as a child. Jun decides to try working honestly for just one more day as if nothing had happened. He and Keiko head back to the snack bar. However, just as they are about to reach the bar, Jun is stopped by riot police cracking down on a demonstration against the construction of Narita International Airport. Overwhelmed with guilt, Jun confesses to killing his parents.

== Cast ==
- Yutaka Mizutani as Jun Saiki
- Mieko Harada as Keiko Tsuneyota
- Etsuko Ichihara as Jun's Mother
- Ryōhei Uchida as Jun's Father
- Kazuko Shirakawa as Keiko's Mother
- Jun Etoh as Michio Miyata
- Kaori Momoi as Ikuko Ishikawa
- Takeo Chii as Toru Hidaka
- Kazuhiko Hasegawa as Father at the Beach
- Go Hasegawa as Son at the Beach
- Sue Mitobe as Fisherwoman
- Chigusa Takayama as Fisherwoman
- Kai Atō
- Makoto Satō
- Akira Shimizu
- Akira Takahashi
- Yuji Arikawa
- Haruo Kariya
- Akio Kuwasaki
- Yoshihiko Miyake
- Tomoko Noguchi
- Hironori Sakuma
- Kumi Sugita
- Saburo Taniyama
- Tsutomu Yuzawa
- Seiji Himuro

== Background ==
Director Hasegawa decided to adapt Nakagami's story after reading it in the September 1975 issue of Bungeishunjū. He struggled with the screenplay; after four months of research, he hired Tsutomu Tamura to finish the writing process. However, Hasegawa made significant changes to Tamura's script while filming, intending to give more insight into Jun's perspective. This angered Tamura, who sent a letter to Hasegawa threatening to sue him and get the film banned if any more changes were made.

== Production ==
Hasegawa had seen Yutaka Mizutani in the television series Kizu darake no tenshi and asked mutual acquaintance Kenichi Hagiwara to introduce them. Upon meeting Mizutani, Hasegawa asked him "Would you like to be the Japanese James Dean?" Mizutani was cast as Jun shortly afterwards.

Mieko Harada, who was 17 at the time of filming, hated the film's intense production process and never saw it.

The Youth Killer was shot guerrilla style on location in Ichihara and Shimoda. The production went over budget, with Hasegawa reportedly incurring a debt of ¥15 million. Hasegawa and Mizutani received no payment for their work.

The film's final scene, in which a bar is set ablaze, was shot without permission from the Ichihara government. To execute the sequence, a bar set was constructed in the city and then lit on fire. However, the fire was initially weaker than expected, prompting the crew to take turns pouring gasoline onto the set. The fire grew to such a degree that it caused traffic congestion in the surrounding area. Local firefighters were called, and when they arrived, they were furious and argued with producer Shōhei Imamura.

== Soundtrack ==
The film's soundtrack was composed and arranged by Mickie Yoshino and the band Godiego, with English language lyrics by Yoko Narahashi. It was released as an LP by Disk Union in 1976.

When asked about the soundtrack, director Hasegawa said, "We originally intended to use The Beatles for the music, but we gave up when we were told that the copyright and usage fees alone would have been several times the budget for the film itself." Hasegawa allowed Narahashi to write English lyrics for the songs, which was considered unusual at the time.

All music is composed by Mickie Yoshino, Yukihide Takekawa and Yoko Narahashi unless otherwise noted:

No.	Title	Writer(s)	Vocals	Length
1.	"I'll Entrust My Memories to You"	Mickie Yoshino, Yoko Narahashi (lyrics)	Yukihide Takekawa
2.	"White Bird (Instrumental #1) - Jun and Keiko"	Takekawa (composer), Yoshino (arrangement)
3.	"Jun and Father"	Yoshino
4.	"Corpses"	Yoshino
5.	"Voices of the Dead"	Yoshino
6.	"Yellow Center Line (To the Town of Sunset and Festivals)"	Yoshino, Narahashi (lyrics)	Takekawa
7.	"I'll Entrust My Memories to You (Instrumental #1) - Reminiscences - In the Clearing II"	Yoshino, Narahashi (lyrics)	Takekawa
8.	"I'll Entrust My Memories to You (Instrumental #2) - Reminiscences - In the Clearing III"	Takekawa (composer), Yoshino (arrangement)
9.	"Strange Wedding (8mm film "Crucifixion")"	Yoshino
10.	"I'll Entrust My Memories to You - Reminiscences - In the Clearing I"	Takekawa (composer), Yoshino (arrangement)
11.	"White Bird (Instrumental #2) - Keiko's Fig"	Takekawa (composer), Yoshino (arrangement)
12.	"Murderous Intent - Flashback"	Yoshino
13.	"A Moment of Relaxation (Recollection - Popsicle Seller on the Beach)"	Yoshino, Narahashi (lyrics)	Takekawa
14.	"Magic Painting (Recollection - Opening of a Snack Bar)"	Yoshino, Narahashi (lyrics)	Takekawa
15.	"A Moment of Relaxation - Short Version - (Ending - Expressway)"	Takahiko Ishikawa, Narahashi (lyrics)	Takekawa

== Release ==
The Youth Killer was theatrically released by Art Theatre Guild on October 23, 1976, in Japan. It was initially given a limited release in four theaters. Hasegawa claimed to have sold 5,000 tickets himself in order to pay back debts incurred during production.

The film was later released to DVD on November 22, 2001. King Records released the film on Blu-ray on February 12, 2014.

== Reception ==
The film received acclaim upon release. Japanese critic Naofumi Higuchi stated that he was "moved and shocked" by the film.

In the years since its release, The Youth Killer has continued to receive acclaim. It has also been cited as an influence by several writers and filmmakers. Author Alice Arisugawa stated that "It's a special film for me," while Hisashi Nozawa said that it inspired him to become a screenwriter. Takahisa Zeze and Nobuhiro Doi have both cited the film as an influence. In addition, Gakuryū Ishii has said of the film: "It's no exaggeration to say that films like Youth Killer saved me. Thanks to them, I didn't become a criminal."

== Awards and nominations ==
50th Kinema Junpo Best Ten Awards

- Won: Best Film
- Won: Best Japanese Director (Kazuhiko Hasegawa)
- Won: Best Screenplay (Tsutomu Tamura)
- Won: Best Actor (Yutaka Mizutani)
- Won: Best Actress (Mieko Harada, also won for Lullaby of the Earth)
- Readers' Choice Top 10 Japanese Films of the Year: 3rd place

31st Mainichi Film Awards

- Won: Excellence Film (shared with Tora-san's Sunrise and Sunset and Brother and Sister)

1st Hochi Film Awards

- Won: Best New Actress (Mieko Harada, also won for Lullaby of the Earth)

19th Blue Ribbon Awards

- Won: Best Newcomer (Mieko Harada, also won for Lullaby of the Earth)
