= Magic Monkey =

- The remastered CD release's cover

Soundtrack album by Godiego
- Released: October 25, 1978
- Genre: Rock
- Length: 42:35
- Label: Nippon Columbia

Godiego chronology
CM Song Graffiti (1978)	Magic Monkey (1978)	OUR DECADE (1979)

Singles from Magic Monkey
- 1. "Gandhara" Released: October 1, 1978; 2. "Monkey Magic" Released: December 25, 1978

Saiyūki (西遊記) or Magic Monkey is a soundtrack released by Godiego for the television show of the same name, known as Monkey in the west. After its initial release in 1978 as an LP and Compact Cassette, it was recognized by the Oricon as the number 1 selling record and cassette for 1979. It was later released on a CD on October 21, 1993, and then again as a remastered CD on March 19, 2008.

== Summary ==
It was initially released as Magic Monkey (Saiyūki) in Japan, as Monkey in the UK, and Magic Monkey in Australia ("Magic Monkey" appears on the original Japanese release). The track listing of the UK-edition differs slightly from the original Japanese release, while the Australian edition is identical to the Japanese release. All of the songs are sung entirely in English on the Japanese release, whereas the British and Australian releases contain a half-Japanese and half-English version of "Gandhara".

== Track list ==
All lyrics are written by Yōko Narahashi. All arrangement by Mickey Yoshino.

Magic Monkey (Saiyūki) (Japanese) track listing
No.	Title	Music	Vocals	Length
1.	"The Birth of the Odyssey ~ Monkey Magic"	Yoshino ("The Birth of the Odyssey"); Yukihide Takekawa ("Monkey Magic")	Takekawa, Steve Fox	4:59
2.	"Gandhara"	Takekawa	Takekawa	5:22
3.	"Asiatic Fever"	Yoshino	Tommy Snyder	3:52
4.	"We're Heading Out West to India"	Takekawa	Takekawa	4:40
5.	"Thank You, Baby"	Takekawa	Takekawa	1:56
6.	"Steppin' Into Your World"	Yoshino	Takekawa	4:03
7.	"Havoc In Heaven"	Takekawa	Takekawa	3:35
8.	"Dragons and Demons"	Yoshino	Fox	3:16
9.	"A Fool!"	Yoshino	Takekawa	3:26
10.	"Flying"	Yoshino	Snyder	2:38
11.	"Celebration"	Takekawa	Takekawa	4:55
Total length:				42:35

Monkey (British) track listing
No.	Title	Length
1.	"The Birth of the Odyssey ~ Monkey Magic"	4:59
2.	"A Fool!"	3:26
3.	"Asiatic Fever"	3:52
4.	"Dragons and Demons"	3:16
5.	"Celebration"	4:55
6.	"Gandhara" (First Verse Japanese, Second Verse English)	5:22
7.	"Steppin' Into Your World"	4:03
8.	"Flying"	2:38
9.	"Havoc In Heaven"	3:35
10.	"We're Heading Out West to India"	4:40
11.	"Thank You, Baby"	1:56
Total length:		42:35

Magic Monkey (Australian) track listing
No.	Title	Length
1.	"The Birth of the Odyssey ~ Monkey Magic"	4:59
2.	"Gandhara" (First Verse Japanese, Second Verse English)	5:22
3.	"Asiatic Fever"	3:52
4.	"We're Heading Out West to India"	4:40
5.	"Thank You, Baby"	1:56
6.	"Steppin' Into Your World"	4:03
7.	"Havoc In Heaven"	3:35
8.	"Dragons and Demons"	3:16
9.	"A Fool!"	3:26
10.	"Flying"	2:38
11.	"Celebration"	4:55
Total length:		42:35

== See also ==
- 1978 in Japanese music
