= The Galaxy Express 999 =

"銀河鉄道999 The Galaxy Express 999"

Single by Godiego
- B-side: "Taking Off!"
- Released: July 1, 1979
- Genre: Rock
- Label: Nippon Columbia
- Songwriters: Yoko Narahashi, Michio Yamagami, Yukihide Takekawa, Mickie Yoshino

Godiego singles chronology
"Haruka na Tabi e" (1979)	"銀河鉄道999; The Galaxy Express 999" (1979)	"Holy & Bright" (1979)

Galaxy Express 999 (銀河鉄道999(スリーナイン), Ginga Tetsudō Surī Nain) is a song by Japanese rock band Godiego, released as their 11th single. The song was used as the theme song for the 1979 film adaptation of the manga of the same name. The song was composed by Godiego vocalist Yukihide Takekawa and arranged by Godiego keyboardist Mickie Yoshino. Like many Godiego songs, it is both in Japanese and English; the English lyrics were written by Yōko Narahashi and the Japanese lyrics were written by Keisuke Yamakawa. The song reached #2 on the Oricon charts and was the #1 song on The Best Ten for seven weeks.

To differentiate it from the theme song of the anime which has the same name in Japanese, it is often referred to by its English title which is stylized as "THE GALAXY EXPRESS 999".

== Track listing ==
1. "The Galaxy Express 999"
2. "Taking Off!"

== Album cuts ==
- Magic Capsule
- Godiego Hit Special
- W Deluxe
- Godiego The Best All English Songs
- 15th Anniversary Godiego Box
- Godiego Great Best (Japanese & English editions)
- Galaxy Express 999: Eternal Edition File No.7&8
- Galaxy Express 999: Song Collection

== Cover versions ==
Several groups and artists have covered the song since its release in 1979. It was included on Animetal's Animetal Marathon VI, Masaaki Endoh's Enson2, Rica Matsumoto's Manmaru feat. Yukihide Takekawa, Animetal USA's Animetal USA W, and by Exile with Verbal of M-Flo on Exile Catchy Best in 2008.

The Exile cover was digitally commercially successful, being certified by the RIAJ as being downloaded more than one million times as a ringtone, and more than 500,000 times as a full-length cellphone download.

The Sanyo Shinkansen uses two adapted covers from the song at JR West stations as the Shinkansen departure melody for trains running east (towards Osaka) and west (towards Hakata).

== See also ==
- 1979 in Japanese music
