= Gareth Armstrong =

Welsh actor, director, teacher and writer (born 1948)

- Born: Gareth Sydney Armstrong; 26 June 1948 (age 78); Tredegar, Monmouthshire, Wales
- Occupation: Actor

Gareth Sydney Armstrong (born 26 June 1948) is a Welsh actor, director, teacher and writer.

== Career ==
Armstrong began his career by acting in school plays at the Bishop Gore School, Swansea. At the age of 16 he joined the National Youth Theatre; and went on from there to study drama at Hull University.

=== Acting ===
On stage he has played leading roles in most of the UK's regional theatres including Birmingham Rep., Nottingham Playhouse and the Bristol Old Vic where parts ranged from Mamet to Molière. He has specialised in Shakespearean theatre where roles have included Romeo, Richard III, Oberon, Macbeth, Shylock and Prospero. As a member of the Royal Shakespeare Company he worked in Stratford and London and has performed in the West End in plays by Noël Coward, Tom Stoppard, Agatha Christie and most recently in 'Yes, Prime Minister'. He played at Shakespeare's Globe in 2008, 2010, and 2011.

Armstrong's television credits include: Z-Cars, Doctor Who (in the serial The Masque of Mandragora), Blake's 7, The Professionals, Terry and June, One Foot in the Grave, Casualty and EastEnders and Birds of a Feather.

Armstrong provided the voice for the character of Sandy in the Japanese television series Saiyūki, released in English-speaking countries as Monkey. He has recorded hundreds of audiobooks and has recorded all 75 of Georges Simenon's Maigret novels for Audible. For Black Library he has narrated novels and audio dramas at Games Workshop and regularly voices audio dramas for Big Finish.

On radio, Armstrong has played three recurring roles in The Archers on Radio 4, including Sean Myerson, the publican of the Cat and Fiddle and the serial's first regular gay character. Armstrong was sometimes a contributor to Radio Four's 'From Our Own Correspondent' and has worked on plays, features and documentaries for BBC radio.He also starred in an episode of Fear on Four, titled "The Edge", which was first broadcast in 1991.

=== Plays ===
Armstrong is noted for his own one-man show Shylock, in which Shakespeare's principal Jewish character is seen from the viewpoint of Tubal, Shakespeare's only other male Jewish character and Shylock's only friend in the original play. Armstrong began performing the play in 1998 and was still staging it in 2024, when the play was characterised as "a metatheatrical exploration of Shakespeare's Merchant of Venice [...] a compelling meditation on Shylock, tracing both the plot and performance history of Shakespeare's Merchant and the dark details of Jewish persecution in Europe from the twelfth century". Armstrong has toured the play in over fifty countries and across the United States. The play has won awards in New Zealand, Canada, Spain and Germany and been translated into Catalan, Spanish, Italian, French and Russian as well being performed on Dutch television and Romanian radio.

In 2015, Armstrong wrote a five-handed comedy called Fondly Remembered which premiered in London, and was subsequently published by French's Acting Editions.The play was revived at Chiswick's Tabard Theatre in 2024 and is regularly performed by community theatre groups in the UK and overseas.

Armstrong's play A Critical Stage, about the theatre critic James Agate, received its premier in June 2023 at London's Tabard Theatre.

In February 2026 Armstrong's play 'Round About Hogarth' received its premier performance in London. It is a duologue between the great eighteenth century artist, William Hogarth, and that century's most famous actor, David Garrick. The roles were respectively played by Terence Frisch and Miles Richardson.

=== Directing ===
As a director he was a founder of The Made in Wales Stage Company, an artistic director of Cardiff's Sherman Theatre and an Associate Artist at the Salisbury Playhouse. As a freelance he has directed all over the UK, as well as in Europe, and the United States. He has more recently specialised in directing solo shows, which include My Darling Clemmie by Hugh Whitemore and performed by Rohan McCullough, Sherlock Holmes- The Last Act by David Stuart Davies, performed by Roger Llewellyn, and Shakespeare's The Rape of Lucrece performed by Gerard Logan which won the Edinburgh Fringe Stage Award for Best Solo performance in 2012. He and Logan also collaborated on Armstrong's dramatisation of Oscar Wilde's De Profundis in the play called Wilde Without the Boy. Armstrong and Logan have also collaborated on three evenings of ghost stories which regularly tour the UK. Armstrong's production of Hugh Whitemore's play Sand in the Sandwiches starring Edward Fox as the poet John Betjeman toured the UK and played at London's Haymarket Theatre.

=== Books ===
In 2004 Armstrong published his account of presenting his solo play in A Case for Shylock – Around the World with Shakespeare's Jew. His So You Want To Do A Solo Show is an instructional book for professional actors, published by Nick Hern Books.

=== Academia ===
Armstrong has lectured and taught on campuses across the US and taken workshops and masterclasses in India, Sri Lanka, New Zealand, Italy and all over the UK. He has been a guest director at the Royal Central School of Speech and Drama and at the Bristol Old Vic Theatre School. He was an Examiner in Speech and Drama for Trinity College London and still works an assessor for their professional acting awards.
