= House (1977 film) =

1977 film by Nobuhiko Ōbayashi

- Theatrical release poster

Japanese name
- Kanji: ハウス
Transcriptions
- Revised Hepburn: Hausu
- Directed by: Nobuhiko Obayashi
- Screenplay by: Chiho Katsura
- Story by: Chigumi Obayashi
- Produced by: Nobuhiko Obayashi; Yorihiko Yamada
- Starring: Kimiko Ikegami; Miki Jinbo; Ai Matsubara; Kumiko Oba; Mieko Sato; Eriko Tanaka; Masayo Miyako; Kiyohiko Ozaki; Asei Kobayashi; Mitsutoshi Ishigami; Saho Sasazawa; Haruko Wanibuchi; Yōko Minamida
- Cinematography: Yoshitaka Sakamoto
- Edited by: Nobuo Ogawa
- Music by: Asei Kobayashi; Mickie Yoshino
- Production company: Toho Eizō
- Distributed by: Toho
- Release date: 30 July 1977 (Japan)
- Running time: 88 minutes
- Country: Japan
- Language: Japanese

House (Japanese: ハウス, Hepburn: Hausu) is a 1977 Japanese comedy horror film directed and produced by Nobuhiko Obayashi. It is about a schoolgirl traveling with her six friends to her ailing aunt's country home, where they come face to face with supernatural events as the girls are, one by one, devoured by the home. It stars mostly amateur actors, with only Kimiko Ikegami and Yōko Minamida having any notable previous acting experience. The musical score was performed by the rock band Godiego.

Toho Studios approached Obayashi with the suggestion to make a film like Jaws. Influenced by ideas from his daughter Chigumi, he developed ideas for a script by Chiho Katsura. After the project was green-lit, it was put on hold for two years as no one at Toho wanted to direct it. However, Obayashi kept promoting the film until the studio allowed him to direct it himself. House was filmed on one of Toho's largest sets, where Obayashi shot the film without a storyboard over a period of about two months.

The film, which received generally negative reviews, was a box office hit in Japan. After being widely released in North America in 2009 and 2010, it was met with more favorable response and has since gained a cult following.

Despite sharing superficial similarities in plot and genre, it is not related to the 1985 American film of the same name starring William Katt.

== Plot ==
In Tokyo, (Note: The location is identified on screen by the name of the train station where the characters depart.) a teenage girl known as Gorgeous, so called for her beauty, has plans for a summer vacation with her widowed father, a wealthy film composer who has been away in Italy on business. When he returns home, he surprises Gorgeous by announcing he has married a woman named Ryoko Ema. Distraught, Gorgeous goes to her bedroom and writes a letter to her aunt, asking if she can visit her for the summer instead. Her aunt replies and allows her to come. Gorgeous invites her six friends along: Prof, who is highly academic and very good at problem-solving; Melody, who has an affinity for music; Kung Fu, who is athletic and especially skilled at kung fu; Mac, who has a big appetite; Sweet, who is bubbly and gentle; and Fantasy, who is a constant daydreamer.

On arriving at the aunt's house in the countryside, the girls are greeted by her and present a watermelon as a gift. After a tour of the home, they leave the watermelon in a well to keep it cold, as the house's refrigerator is broken. Mac later goes to retrieve it and does not return. When Fantasy goes to the well, she finds Mac's disembodied head, which flies into the air and bites Fantasy's buttocks before she escapes. The incident is initially disregarded by the others, but over time, they begin to encounter supernatural traps throughout the house.

The aunt disappears after entering the broken refrigerator. The girls are attacked or possessed by various items that have seemingly become alive: Gorgeous becomes possessed after using her aunt's mirror; Kung Fu is attacked by flaming logs, losing her skirt; Sweet disappears after being attacked by mattresses. The girls try to escape, but after Gorgeous manages to leave through a door, the others find themselves locked in. Searching for the aunt, they instead discover Mac's severed hand in a jar. Melody plays the piano to lift their spirits, and they hear Gorgeous singing upstairs. As Prof and Kung Fu investigate, the piano comes to life, bites off Melody's fingers and ultimately eats her.

Upstairs, Kung Fu and Prof find Gorgeous wearing a bridal gown, who shows them her aunt's diary. Kung Fu follows Gorgeous, only to find Sweet's body trapped in a grandfather clock, which starts bleeding. The remaining girls barricade the upper floor while Prof, Fantasy, and Kung Fu read the diary.

They are interrupted by a giant disembodied head of Gorgeous, who reveals that her aunt died waiting for her fiancé to return from World War II, and now eats unmarried girls who arrive at her home. The three girls are attacked by household items. Prof shouts to Kung Fu to attack the aunt's cat, Blanche. As Kung Fu lunges into a flying kick, she is eaten by a light fixture. Her legs escape and damage the cat's portrait, killing Blanche. The portrait gushes blood, flooding the room. Prof is pulled underwater by a jar with teeth and dissolves. Fantasy sees Gorgeous in a bridal gown and paddles toward her. In the reflection, Gorgeous appears as her aunt and cradles Fantasy.

In the morning, Ryoko arrives at the house and finds Gorgeous in a kimono. Gorgeous tells her the others will wake soon and that they will be hungry. She then shakes hands with Ryoko, who burns away to nothing.

== Cast ==
- Kimiko Ikegami as Gorgeous (Japanese: オシャレ, Hepburn: Oshare)
- Miki Jinbo as Kung Fu (クンフー, Kunfū)
- Kumiko Oba as Fantasy (ファンタ, Fanta)
- Ai Matsubara as Prof (ガリ, Gari)
- Mieko Sato as Mac (マック, Makku)
- Eriko Tanaka as Melody (メロディー, Merodī)
- Masayo Miyako as (スウィート Suiito}
- Kiyohiko Ozaki as Mr. Keisuke Tōgō (東郷圭介先生, Tōgō Keisuke sensei)
- Saho Sasazawa as father
- Asei Kobayashi as watermelon farmer
- Tomokazu Miura as Auntie's fiancé
- Fumi Dan as teacher
- Mitsutoshi Ishigami as Photographer
- Godiego (Mickie Yoshino, Yukihide Takekawa, Takami Asano, Yoji Yoshizawa, Tommy Snyder, Ryoji Asano) as themselves
- Haruko Wanibuchi as Ryoko Ema (江馬涼子, Ema Ryōko)
- Yōko Minamida as Auntie (おばちゃま, Obachyama)

== Production ==
=== Development ===
Following the success of the American film Jaws, a proposition came from the Toho film studio for Nobuhiko Obayashi to develop a similar script. To find inspiration for the story, Obayashi discussed ideas with his pre-teen daughter Chigumi Obayashi. Nobuhiko sought her ideas, believing that adults "only think about things they understand ... everything stays on that boring human level" while "children can come up with things that can't be explained". Several of Chigumi's ideas were included in House such as a reflection in a mirror attacking the viewer, a watermelon being pulled out of a well appearing like a human head, and a house that eats girls. Other themes Chigumi suggested drew upon her own childhood fears. These fears included a pile of futons falling on her that felt like a monster attacking her, a large loud clock at her grandparents' home, and getting her fingers caught in between her piano keys. Nobuhiko shared these story ideas with screenwriter Chiho Katsura. These ideas reminded Katsura of a short story by Walter de la Mare about an old woman who is visited by her granddaughters and then puts them in a trunk.

Obayashi incorporated themes of the atomic bombings of Hiroshima and Nagasaki into the script. Obayashi was born in Hiroshima and lost all his childhood friends from these bombings. Obayashi applied these themes with the plot element of a woman's ghost waiting for her lover's return from World War II. The woman's bitterness about the war turns her into an evil spirit that devours the girls who were unaffected by the bombings. Obayashi and Katsura had worked previously on a script titled Hanagatami before being assigned to House, which made the screenwriting process easy for both of them. Obayashi titled the script House as he felt that a foreign title for a Japanese film would be "taboo".

=== Pre-production ===
The script for House was green-lit shortly after being presented to Toho. No directors at Toho were interested in directing the film as they felt it would end their career. Obayashi proposed that he would direct it but was turned down as he was not a staff member at Toho. House did not start filming until two years after the script's completion. Toho allowed Obayashi to announce that the film had been green-lit and began promoting the film by passing out business cards that advertised the film. In the 1960s, Obayashi created a short film titled Emotion that was popular at Japanese universities and event halls. Fans of his television commercial and film work helped him promote House before it was even in production. Products based on House that were released included manga, a novelization of the script and a radio drama. The soundtrack for the film was created and released before the film was made.

=== Casting ===
The majority of the cast of House were not established actors, with many having primarily only worked with Obayashi on his commercials and independent films. During the two-year waiting period to start filming House, Obayashi created several commercials and began casting the seven girls from models who were in his commercials.

The most experienced members of the main cast were Kimiko Ikegami and Yōko Minamida. Obayashi was friends with Minamida who he filmed in commercials for Calpis. Minamida was mostly working television and theater at the time and worried that taking the role of the older woman would have a negative effect on the roles she would be subsequently offered, but still agreed to play the part.

Singer Kiyohiko Ozaki, who plays Mr. Togo in the film, was cast because he was friends with Obayashi through their shared hobby of horseback riding.

Other roles were filled by members of the crew and their families; for example, Nobuhiko Obayashi's daughter Chigumi plays the little girl at the shoemaker's shop, and the film's production designer plays the shoemaker.

=== Filming ===
The special effects in House were purposely made to look unrealistic.

Obayashi recalled that his producer told him that Toho was tired of losing money on comprehensible films and were ready to let Obayashi direct the House script, which they felt was incomprehensible. Toho officially green-lit the film's production after the success of the radio drama based on House. Obayashi received special permission to direct the film despite not being a member of the Toho staff.

House was filmed on one of Toho's largest sets, where Obayashi shot the film without a storyboard for about two months. Obayashi described the attitude on the set as very upbeat as he often skipped, sang and played quiz games with the younger actresses on the set. Despite having fun on the set, members of the Toho crew felt the film was nonsense. Obayashi found the acting of the seven girls to be poor while trying to direct them verbally. He began playing the film's soundtrack on set, which changed the way the girls were acting in the film as they got into the spirit of the music. Actress Kimiko Ikegami was uncomfortable about a nude scene in the film. To make her more comfortable, Yoko Minamida, who had never done a nude scene before, also took off her clothes. After Obayashi saw Minamida nude, he included a topless scene for her in the film which was not in the original script.

Obayashi already had experience with special effects from his work on television commercials. Obayashi and the cameraman oversaw the special effects for the film. Obayashi desired the special effects to look unrealistic as if a child created them. For the scene in which Ai Matsubara's character vanishes under the blood, Obayashi had her suspended nude, pouring buckets of blue paint on her to create a blue-screen chroma key effect where the blue-colored parts of her body would deteriorate on camera. The outcome of a lot of these effects would be unknown until the film was completed. Obayashi stated that sometimes the effects did not turn out how he originally envisioned them.

=== Music ===
The soundtrack for the film was created and released before the film's production. Asei Kobayashi, who worked with Obayashi on his television commercials, contributed the piano pieces for the film's soundtrack. Kobayashi felt that younger people should contribute to the film's soundtrack and suggested Mickie Yoshino and his band Godiego should contribute songs based on Yoshino's piano pieces. Singer Ken Narita played blues harp on the track "Hungry House Blues", and also contributed vocals to "House Love Theme". All tracks were arranged by Mickie Yoshino, and produced by Yoshino with Asei Kobayashi.

== Release ==
House was first released on 30 July 1977 in Japan, where it was distributed by Toho. It was originally released as a double feature with the romance film Pure Hearts in Mud. Toho did not expect House to be successful, but the film became a commercial hit, becoming specifically popular with a youth audience. House was not officially screened in the United States until the distribution rights were bought by Janus Films to be released as part of their Eclipse line of DVDs. The Eclipse brand was originally conceived as a possible sub-label for cult films released by the Criterion Collection.

Janus soon began getting requests for theatrical screenings of the film. Janus initiated a small tour of theatrical showings, including two sold-out shows at the 2009 New York Asian Film Festival. In January 2010, a remastered print of House by Janus began being shown theatrically across North America, with the first of the showings taking place at the IFC Center in New York City.

House was released by the Masters of Cinema label in the United Kingdom on DVD. Bonus features on the disc included interviews with the cast and crew and the theatrical trailer. House was released by the Criterion Collection on DVD and Blu-ray on 26 October 2010. Bonus features on the disc include a making-of featurette that features interviews with the crew; director Obayashi's short film Emotion, which was first released in 1966; an appreciation video featuring American filmmaker Ti West; and a promotional trailer for House.

== Reception ==
The film did not receive many reviews in Japan on its initial release. The general reception among Japanese critics who did review the film was negative. Nobuhiko Obayashi won the Blue Ribbon Award for Best New Director in 1978 for House, and, on House's theatrical screenings across North America in 2010, the film began to receive generally favorable reviews. House was The New York Times critic's pick stating that "Mr. Obayashi has created a true fever dream of a film, one in which the young female imagination—that of his daughter, Gorgeous or both—yields memorable results." The Seattle Times gave House three out of four stars, stating that what the film "lacks in technical wizardry it more than makes up for in playful ingenuity, injecting cheesy effects into outrageously stylized set pieces." Slant Magazine gave the film three stars out of four, calling it "equal parts brilliant, baffling, ridiculous, and unwatchable." The New York Post gave the film three and a half stars out of four, praising the film's originality, comparing it to the work of directors Dario Argento and Guy Maddin. IndieWire included House in their list of "Haunted House films worth discussing" calling it "the cheeriest, most infectious blood bath in cinematic history."

Richard Whittaker of The Austin Chronicle gave House a mixed review, saying that "there's surprisingly little to recommend House as a film. But as an experience, well, that's a whole other story." Michael Atkinson of The Village Voice gave the film a mixed review as well, saying that "Contemporary Japanese pop culture makes the hophead nonsense of House look quaint by comparison... though it plays like a retarded hybrid of Rocky Horror and Whispering Corridors, it is, moment to moment, its own kind of movie hijinks." Tom Russo of The Boston Globe gave the film two stars out of four, opining that Sam Raimi and Peter Jackson had attempted similar-styled films with more success.

== Legacy ==
In the years following its release, House has gradually accumulated a cult following and is now considered a cult classic. Contemporary review aggregation website Rotten Tomatoes offers a 90% approval rating from 42 critics—an average rating of 7.50/10, which provides the consensus, "House is a gleefully demented collage of grand guignol guffaws and bizarre sequences." Metacritic, which uses a weighted average, assigned the film a score of 75 out of 100, based on 12 critics, indicating "generally favorable" reviews. According to film critic and scholar Jasper Sharp, the film successfully managed to "recapture a younger audience demographic believed lost to television and Hollywood".

House has been included in multiple lists by various media outlets. In 2009, the Japanese film magazine Kinema Junpo placed House at number 160 on their list of top 200 Japanese films. It was placed at number 117 by Rotten Tomatoes based on its average review score, in their list of 200 Greatest Horror Movies of All Time. Screen Rant ranked the film at number 9 in their list of The 16 Best Japanese Horror Movies of All Time. Bloody Disgusting included the film in The 20 All-Time Best Haunted House Horror Movies, stating that the film "takes the haunted house concept to wacky extremes".

Sarah Cleary for BFI commented that the film was "a fevered flight of horror-fantasy like no other." Similarly, Far Out described it as "a psychedelic trip like no other, featuring a flurry of animation, surreal violence and enigmatic Japanese energy [...] Obayashi suffuses his world with a mix of vivid hand-drawn animation and surreal cinematic choices to take the viewer on a dance of phantasmagorical absurdity."

== See also ==
- Japanese horror
- Kaibyō – supernatural cats in Japanese folklore
- List of cult films
- List of ghost films
- List of horror films of 1977
