= Masaaki Sakai =

Japanese performer (born 1946)

- 堺 正章
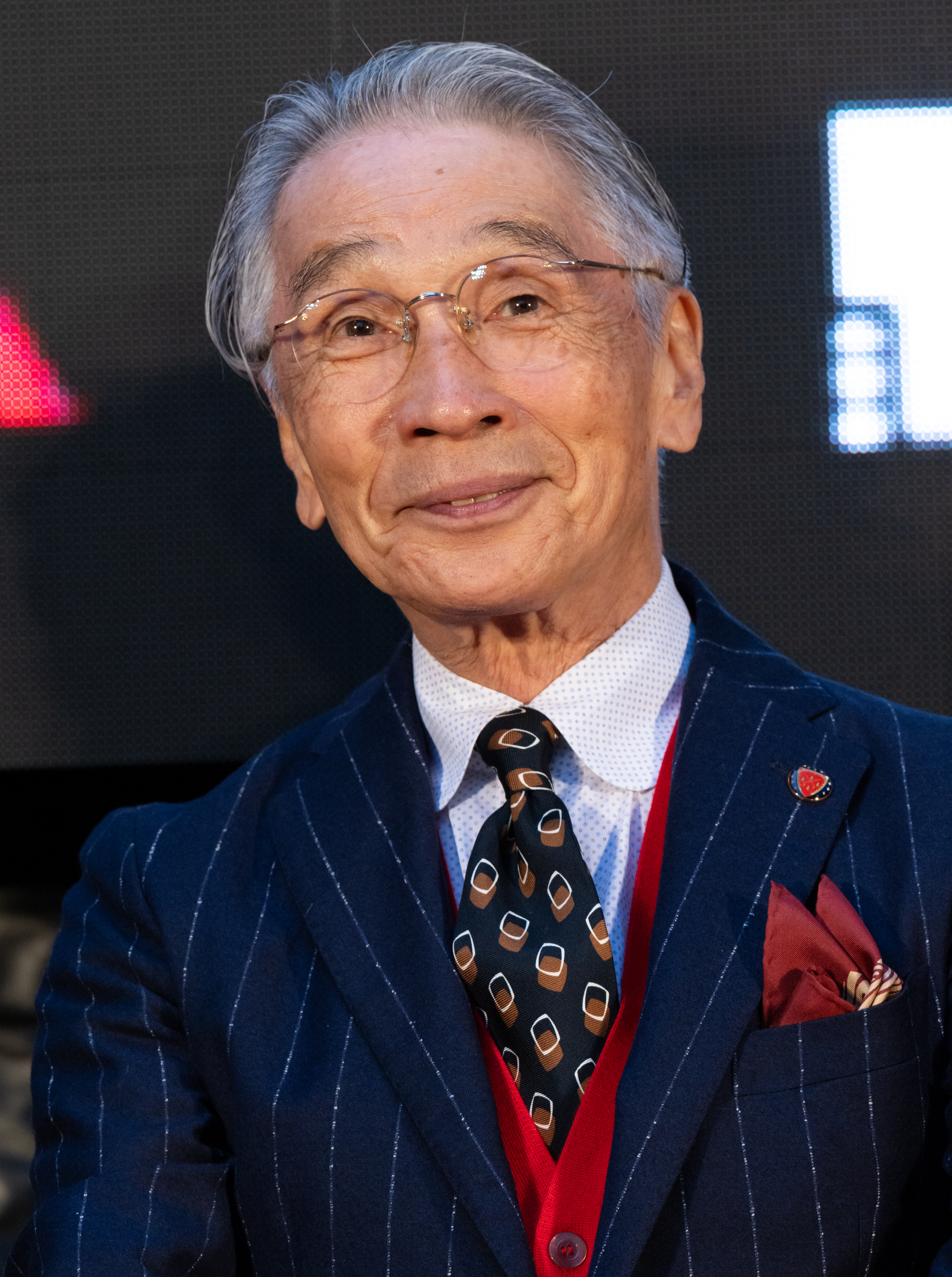
- Masaaki Sakai at the 37th Tokyo International Film Festival in 2024
- Born: June 6, 1946 (age 79); Tokyo, Japan
- Occupation: Actor

Masaaki Sakai (堺 正章, Sakai Masaaki; born June 6, 1946 as Masaaki Kurihara (栗原 正章, Kurihara Masaaki)) is a popular Japanese performer from Tokyo. He is best known to English-speaking audiences as the title star of the TV show Monkey.

== Biography ==
Masaaki Sakai is a Japanese actor, singer and martial artist. Born the son of Shunji Sakai, a famous comedian in Japan, Sakai initially came to fame by fronting the group sounds band The Spiders. This group, formed in 1962, was popular throughout the 1960s; they spawned several hit songs as well as thirteen situation comedy films featuring their music.

He took the title role of Sun Wukong in the 1970s Japanese TV program Saiyūki (lit. "Journey to the West"). This gained him fame in many English-speaking countries in the early 1980s when it was dubbed by the BBC and retitled Monkey. Due to his fame playing the mythical character Sun Wukong, Sakai created a dance called "the Monkey" which became a craze in Japan. Prior to taking the role in Monkey, Sakai learnt the art of staff known as Bōjutsu for 2 years. Sakai went on to a successful solo career after The Spiders disbanded, and continued acting in films and on television.

In 1999, he formed the band Sans Filtre with two former Spiders, Hiroshi Kamayatsu and Takayuki Inoue. They released their first album Yei Yei in 2000.

Sakai is known in Japan as a car enthusiast and regularly took part in the annual Mille Miglia race in Italy with his wife as a co-driver. He won a similar Japanese road race on October 18, 2000 driving a 1947 Cisitalia 202 MM with Inoue Takayuki (the guitarist from Sans Filtre) as co-driver. Due to business commitments he gave up racing in 2002 and gave his Alfa Romeo race car to Masahiko Kondō who is also a singer and race enthusiast. He is also a hobby archer.

Sakai has been married and divorced twice, and has two daughters. He is an active supporter of AIDS charities. His show-business nickname is "Machaaki".

== TV shows ==
Sakai starred in a series about travelling around Europe as well as the following series:

- Saiyūki (Monkey)
- Hakkutsu! Aruaru Daijiten
- Chubaw Desu yo! (titled in English as Saturday Night Chubaw) from 1994 to the present, where Sakai and a guest attempt to cook the dishes of famous restaurants.
- Shinano no Columbo (as the lead character in Japan's version of Columbo)
