= Ken Narita (singer) =

Japanese musician and singer

Ken Narita 成田 賢
- Born: October 22, 1945; Dairen, Soviet Manchuria
- Died: November 13, 2018 (aged 73)
- Genre: Anison

Ken Narita (成田 賢, Narita Ken; October 22, 1945 – November 13, 2018) was a Japanese musician and singer who primarily sang anison, or anime theme songs. He was most known for being the singer of the theme songs "For Whom" (誰がために, Ta ga Tame ni) of the 1979 anime Cyborg 009 and "Oh, Denshi Sentai Denziman" (ああ電子戦隊デンジマン, Aa Denshi Sentai Denjiman) of the 1980 Super Sentai series, Denshi Sentai Denziman. He released Super Best! For Whom?: Ken Narita History (スーパーベスト 誰がために～成田賢ヒストリー, Sūpābesuto Ta ga Tame ni~Narita Ken Hisutorī), a compilation of his works. He also provided vocals to a song on the soundtrack to the 1977 film House.

Narita died from pneumonia on November 13, 2018, at the age of 73.
