= Kumiko Ōba =

Japanese actress (born 1960)

Kumiko Ohba
- 大場 久美子
- Born: January 6, 1960 (age 66); Kawaguchi, Saitama, Japan
- Education: Hatogaya Municipal Nakai Elementary School; Hatogaya Municipal Hachimangi Junior High School; Tokyo Seitoku College University High School; Horikoshi High School
- Occupations: Actress, singer, psychological counselor
- Years active: 1973 -
- Agent: Office Kiko
- Known for: Princess Comet
- Height: 1.53 m (5 ft 0 in)
- Spouse: Tetsuya Takahashi (m. 2000–2005)
- Website: Official website

Kumiko Ohba (大場 久美子, Ōba Kumiko; born January 6, 1960, in Kawaguchi, Saitama, Japan) is a Japanese actress, singer, and psychological counselor who is represented by Office Keiko. She is eldest of three siblings (one brother and one younger brother).

== Filmography ==
Year	Title	Role	Network	Notes
1975	Paula TV Shōsetsu		TBS	
1978	Princess Comet	Comet-san	TBS	Lead role
1978	Magical 7 Dai Bōken		TBS	Lead role
1979	Shōjo Tantei Super W		TBS	Lead role
1979	Atsui Arashi		TBS	
1980	Uwasa no Keiji Tommy to Matsu	Kumi Oshima	TBS	Episode 38
1980	Naze ka Hatsukoi Minamikaze		TBS	
1981	Nureta Kokoro: Lesbian Satsujin Jiken		TV Asahi	Lead role
1981	Hongō Kikuzaka Akamon-dōri	Asako Shikamachi	Fuji TV	
1981	Himitsu no Deka-chan		TBS	
1981	Mito Kōmon		TBS	
1982	Taiyō ni Hoero!		NTV	Episodes 535 and 577
1982	The Suspence		TBS	
1982	Akatsuki ni Kiru!		KTV	Episode 1
1983	Boku no Imōto ni Sono 9		TBS	
1983	Kyotaro Nishimura Travel Mystery		TV Asahi	
1983	Ōoka Echizen		TBS	
1983	Ōoku	Onami	KTV	Episode 17
1983	Zenigata Heiji	Oito	Fuji TV	Episode 846
1983	Jidaigeki Special	Nao	Fuji TV	
1983	Ōedo Sōsamō	Okinu	TV Tokyo	Episode 616
1985	Masashi-kun		Fuji TV	
1985	Binetsu My Love		Fuji TV	
1985	Kin'yō On'na no Drama Special		Fuji TV	
1985	Drama Ningen Moyō		NHK G TV	
1985	Tokusō Saizensen	Midori Miyagi	TV Asahi	Episode 436
1985	Yattekimashita! Hadaka no Taishō	Sayuri	KTV	
1986	The Samurai		Fuji TV	
1986	Shizuko Natsuki Suspense: Itsuwari no Kyōki		KTV	Lead role
1987	Tantei Kyōsuke Kamizu no Satsujin Suiri		TV Asahi	
1987	Edo o Kiru	Sayo	TBS	Episode 24
1987	Aries no Otome-tachi	Sayuri Yuki	Fuji TV	
1989	Ni-san Tantei-mei Suiri		TV Asahi	
1989	Sasurai Keiji Ryojō-hen II		TV Asahi	Episode 10
1989	Shizuko Natsuki	Yuko Kume	TBS	
1989	Kyōto Gourmet Ryokō Satsujin Jiken	Junko Kato	Fuji TV	
1990	Sanbiki ga Kiru!		TV Asahi	
1990	Abare Hasshū Goyō Tabi	Oyo	TV Tokyo	Episode 1
1990	Yonimo Kimyōna Monogatari	Kogiku Sugita	Fuji TV	
1992	Nagoya Demodori Monogatari		Fuji TV	
1992	Suspicion		Fuji TV	
1993	Kasei-fu wa Mita!		TV Asahi	
1993	Kon'yoku Rotenburo Renzoku Satsujin		TV Asahi	
1993	Lullaby Keiji '93		TV Asahi	Episode 10
1993	Zenigata Heiji	Okyo	Fuji TV	Third series, Episode 3
1993	Mei bugyō Tōyama no Kin-san	Oshizuka	TV Asahi	Fifth series, Episode 14
1994	Hagurekeiji Junjō-ha VII		TV Asahi	Episode 3
1995	Bijin Sanshimai on Senge Isha ga Yuku!	Kikuno	Fuji TV	
1995	Moshimo Negai ga Kanaunara		TBS	
1996	Shin Aka Kabu Kenji Funsen-ki		TV Asahi	
1997	Psychometrer Eiji		NTV	Episode 5
1997	Suna no Shiro	Miyuri Iwaki	THK	
1998	Diet Sanshimai no Ryojō Jiken-bo		TV Asahi	
1999	Moero!! Robocon		TV Asahi	Episode 22
2005	Misa Yamamura Suspense		Fuji TV	
2007	SP	Yuko Okawa	Fuji TV	Episode 1
2008	Jiro Akagawa Mystery 4 Shimai Tantei-dan	Sumiko Fukano	ABC	Episode 8
2008	Around40: Chūmon no ōi On'na-tachi	Michiko Nakayama	TBS	

=== Films ===
Year	Title	Notes
1976	Isho Shiroi Shōjo	
1977	House	
1982	Himeyuri no Tō	
1983	Ushimitsu no Mura	
2000	Hasen no Maris	
