= Shiro Kishibe =

Japanese actor and singer (1949–2020)

Shiro Kishibe; 岸部四郎
- Born: 7 June 1949; Kyoto, Kyoto Prefecture, Occupation of Japan
- Died: 28 August 2020 (aged 71); Chiba Prefecture, Japan
- Other name: Shirō Kishibe (岸部シロー)
- Occupations: Actor, businessperson, presenter
- Years active: 1967–2014

Shirō Kishibe (岸部 四郎, Kishibe Shirō; 7 June 1949 – 28 August 2020) was a Japanese actor and singer born in Kyoto, Occupied Japan. He is best known to English-speaking audiences for playing Sandy, one of the regular main characters in the TV show Monkey. Kishibe's father was a former Kempeitai member. He also had an elder brother, Ittoku Kishibe, who was a member of the band Tigers.

== Biography ==
=== Member of The Tigers ===
Upon graduating from junior high school, Kishibe worked at a printing company but left to join the road crew for The Tigers, where his elder brother Ittoku Kishibe played bass. After working as a musical advisor post their 1967 debut, he moved to the United States in July 1968, with assistance from Watanabe Productions and the band members. In the U.S., he worked as a music correspondent for the magazine Music Life under the guise of studying abroad. In March 1969, after bassist Katsumi Kahashi departed The Tigers, Kishibe was recalled by his older brother Ittoku and became a new member. Though tasked with guitar duties as Kahashi's successor, Kishibe, unable to actually play, would pretend to do so during performances. He also played the tambourine and took over Kahashi's vocal parts. His induction into The Tigers, despite his lack of musical experience, was reportedly due to a plot orchestrated by Watanabe Productions, wherein Ittoku's younger brother would "save" the group amidst a crisis.

In December 2013, Kishibe reunited with The Tigers. Assisted by a wheelchair and brought on stage by Hitomi Minoru, he sang The Beatles' "Yesterday" alongside Katsumi Kahashi on guitar and brother Ittoku Kishibe on bass. This was the first occasion all six Tigers members shared the stage, as Hitomi Minoru had not participated in their 1980s reunion.

Kishibe died from acute heart failure in August 2020 at the age of 71.
