= Monkey Magic (song) =

Single by Godiego

from the album Magic Monkey
- A-side: "Monkey Magic"
- B-side: "A Fool!"
- Released: December 25, 1978
- Genre: Rock
- Label: Nippon Columbia
- Songwriters: Yoko Narahashi, Yukihide Takekawa

Godiego singles chronology
"Gandhara" (1978)	"Monkey Magic" (1978)	"Beautiful Name" (1979)

"Monkey Magic" (モンキー・マジック, Monkī Majikku) is a song by Japanese rock band Godiego, serving as their 8th single. It is internationally known as the opening theme for the 1978 television series Saiyūki (西遊記), known in English as Monkey. The song peaked at #2 on the Oricon Charts and #4 on The Best Ten.

== Track list ==
Japanese single track listing

1. "Monkey Magic"
2. "A Fool"

British single track listing

1. "Monkey Magic"
2. "Gandhara"
  The first verse is Japanese, the second verse is English
3. "Thank You, Baby"

Australian single track listing

1. "The Birth of the Odyssey ~ Monkey Magic"
2. "Gandhara"

== Cover versions ==
Soko released a cover version in 1999

A cover version of "Monkey Magic" by Orange Range was featured in the Nintendo DS video game, Moero! Nekketsu Rhythm Damashii Osu! Tatakae! Ouendan 2. Animetal made their version on the Animetal Marathon VII album. Another cover was featured in Lucky Star. Godiego released their own self cover on the single "Monkey Magic 2006". Also AAA made one for their cover album "CCC-CHALLENGE COVER COLLECTION-". The Japanese-Canadian pop group Monkey Majik (which took their name from the song) released a new cover version in 2007.

Cobra Starship released a cover version in 2009. It was made available on the iTunes Germany version of their album Hot Mess.

Korean pop singer E-Paksa performed a cover for a compilation of his unique variety of "ponchak" music, which was one featured on the Korean dance simulation game Pump It Up.

== See also ==
- 1978 in Japanese music
