= Miki Jinbo =

Japanese actress and singer (born 1960)

- 神保 美喜
- Born: June 2, 1960 (age 66); Minato, Tokyo, Japan
- Education: Horikoshi High School; Aoyama Gakuin University
- Occupations: Actress, singer
- Years active: 1976–present
- Agent: Staff-up
- Known for: Star Tanjō!; "Hajimete no Waltz"; House; Uta no Wide 90-bu
- Height: 1.64 m (5 ft 5 in)
- Website: Official website (in Japanese)

Miki Jinbo (神保 美喜, Jinbo Miki; born June 2, 1960, in Minato, Tokyo, Japan) is a Japanese actress and singer represented by Staff-up.

== Biography ==
Jinbo entered Horikoshi High School, and in March 1983, she graduated from Aoyama Gakuin University Faculty of Letters, Second Section of English and American Literature.

While in third-year junior high school, she won the 15th Battle Tournament in Nippon TV's Star Tanjō!.

In March 1976, Jinbo signed with Philips Records (now Universal Music Japan) and debuted as a singer with the single "Hajimete no Waltz".

She performs as an actress and a singer. Jinbo is also a presenter in music series.

Notable performances are in Yōba (1976) and the horror-comedy film House (1977).

She appeared in an advertisement for DHC. Jinbo later commented in her blog that she loved DHC.

== Filmography ==
=== Films ===
Year	Title	Notes
1976	Permanent Blue: Manatsu no Koi	
1976	Yōba	
1977	House	
1978	Zanshō	
1983	Plumeria no Densetsu: Tengoku no Kiss	
1985	Keiji Monogatari: Kuroshio no Uta	
1986	Mandara-ya no Ryōta	
1986	Rikon Shinai Onna	

=== Drama ===
Year	Title	Role	Network	Notes
1977	Shiroi Kōya		TBS	
1978	Nichiyō Kyōfu Series		Fuji TV	Episode 7
1979	Netchū Jidai		NTV	
1979	Kakekomi Buil 7-gōshitsu		Fuji TV	Episode 1
1980	Doberman Deka	Saeko Shiratori	TV Asahi	
1981	Tetsudō Kōankan		TV Asahi	Episode 36
1983	Ōoku	Oko	KTV	Episode 38
1983	Mito Kōmon		TBS	Series 13 Episode 26, Series 20 Episode 10
1984	Seibu Keisatsu Part-III	Yumiko Kanzaki	TV Asahi	Episode 43
1985	Abarenbō Shogun II	Oyu	TV Asahi	Episode 102
1985	Chōshichirō Edo Nikki	Okyo	NTV	Episode 53
1985	Shadow Warriors		KTV	Episode 7
1987	Sanbiki ga Kiru!		TV Asahi	
1990	The Keiji	Junko Kawakami	TV Asahi	Episode 12
1993	Ōoka Echizen	Osono	TBS	Episode 20
1994	Zenigata Heiji	Okayo	Fuji TV	Series 4 Episode 5
1997	Saigo no Koi	Reiko Saito	TBS	
1997	Getsuyō Drama Special	Hisako Kitamura	TBS	
2002	Bengoshi Kyoko Takamizawa		TBS	
2003	Keiji Ichiro		TBS	Episode 9
	Hagure Dorobō Goro Ishikawa		Fuji TV	
2005	Kenji Yoko Asahina	Kumi Nishikawa	TV Asahi	
2006	Doctor Koishi no Jiken Karute	Chiharu Sakurai	Fuji TV	
2009	Kyotaro Nishimura Travel Mystery (51) Tsuriawanai Jōsha-ken o Kau Shitai	Yasuko Koike	TV Asahi	
2009	Sono Otoko, Fuku Shochō		TV Asahi	Series 3 Episode 5
2009	Kyoto Minami-sho Kanshiki File	Yuko Fujimura	TV Asahi	
2010	Hanchō: Jinnan-sho Asaka Han	Yoko Yaginuma	TBS	Series 3 Episode 7
2013	Seifuku Sōsa	Nobuko Shinozaki	TBS	

=== Direct-to-video ===
Year	Title	Notes
2001	Shizukanaru Don – Yakuza Side Story	
2002	Jitsuroku Yakuza Kōsō-shi LB Kumamoto Keimusho 4 Keimusho Bus-tei Mae	

=== Stage ===
Title	Notes
Trapp Family Story	
Horibe Yasubei	
Tabigarasu Yoarashi Sen San: Yuki no Oiwake Sandogasa	
Fu Keizu: Otsuta Monogatari	
Tsugaru Ninjō Onna-bushi	
Haru Sugata Senryō Matoi	
Wakatono Senryō Kasa	
Nihonichi? no Otō-chan	
Onna Udemakuri	
Bakushō! ! Shiranami Go-ri Otoko	

=== Variety ===
Year	Title	Network	Notes
1982	Uta no Wide 90-bu	NTV	
	Ichi-mai no Shashin	Fuji TV	
	Challenge the Keiba	Fuji TV	
	Zubari Iu Wa yo	TBS	
	Kazuo Tokumitsu no Kandō Saikai "Aitai"	TBS	
	Quiz Nihonjin no Shitsumon	NHK G TV	
	Art Entertainment Meikyū Bijutsukan	NHK BS-2	
	Asada! Namadesu Tabi Salad	TV Asahi	
	Kaiketsu Emi Channel	KTV	

=== Radio series ===
Title	Network	Notes
Coffee Time	Tokyo FM	
Miki Jinbo no Brilliant na Josei	Radio Nippon	
Miki Jinbo no Tea Lounge	NCB	

== Discography ==
=== Singles ===
Year	Title	Notes
1976	"Hajimete no Waltz"	
1976	"Mizuiro no Omoide"	
1977	"Furuutsu no Uta"	
