= Princess Comet =

Japanese TV drama, anime and manga series

- Cover of the 2021 Blu-ray release of the anime series.

コメットさん (Kometto-san)
- Genre: Magical girl
- Created by: Mitsuteru Yokoyama
- Manga
- Written by: Mitsuteru Yokoyama
- Published by: Shueisha
- Magazine: Margaret
- Original run: June 10, 1967 – November 11, 1967
- Volumes: 1
- Television drama

Princess Comet: Yumiko Kokonoe
- Directed by: Ōtsuki Yoshikazu
- Written by: Mamoru Sasaki
- Music by: Joji Yuasa; Masashi Tashiro
- Studio: International Television Films; A Production(Animated Segments)
- Original network: TBS
- Original run: July 3, 1967 – December 30, 1968
- Episodes: 79
- Television drama

Princess Comet: Kumiko Ohba
- Directed by: Noriaki Yuasa; Yoshiharu Tomita
- Music by: Masaaki Hirao; Hiroaki Hagiwara
- Studio: International Television Films
- Original network: TBS
- Original run: June 12, 1978 – September 24, 1979
- Episodes: 68
- Anime television series

Cosmic Baton Girl Princess Comet
- Directed by: Mamoru Kanbe
- Written by: Akira Okeya
- Music by: Moka
- Studio: Nippon Animation
- Original network: TXN (TV Osaka, TV Tokyo)
- Original run: April 1, 2001 – January 27, 2002
- Episodes: 43
- icon

Princess Comet (コメットさん, Kometto-san; "Ms. Comet") is a multimedia franchise beginning with a dorama series created by Mitsuteru Yokoyama and produced by International Television Films, a division of the film company Toho. Directed by Ōtsuki Yoshikazu and written by Mamoru Sasaki, it stars Japanese singer and actor Yumiko Kokonoe in its lead role as Comet, a mischievous girl from the Beta Star sent to Earth after causing mischief who must learn responsibility while using her magical powers to solve her problems. The series aired on TBS from July 3, 1967, to September 24, 1979. A short-lived manga series written and illustrated by Mitsuteru Yokoyama was released from June 10, 1967, to November 11, 1967.

A second series, created 10 years after the original, was aired on the same network from June 12, 1978, to September 24, 1979, while an anime remake based on aspects from both live action series was produced by Nippon Animation and aired on TV Osaka and TV Tokyo from April 1, 2001, to January 27, 2002.

The first two series are notable for being the first live-action magical girl series produced in Japan, while the first series is the first live-action series released in color.

== Plot ==
=== Yumiko Kokonoe series ===
Far away in the deep reaches of space lies the Beta Star, where magical human-like people live. Comet is one of those people who is a student in a school in the Beta Star. But one day, she caused an accident in the school, causing the principal to get angry at her and banish her to Earth in hopes it can teach her to be responsible for her actions. On Earth, she made her residence with both the Kawagoe and Ishihara families as she uses her magic to solve some problems with a little guidance.

=== Kumiko Ohba series ===
Comet is a student living in the Virgo Star System, in which she embarked on a studies trip in hopes for her to graduate. Her assignment for her studies is to "search for the most beautiful things on the planet she chose to settle on." She stayed with the Sawano family as a house maid she forms a bond with them while she uses her magic baton to solve her problems.

=== 2001 series ===
Deep within the universe lies the Triangle Nebula, a star cluster ruled by three monarchs of the Harmonica Star country, the Castanet Star country and the Tambourine Star country and either two of the three kingdom's union could unite the Triangle Nebula into a new star. The story revolves Comet, a twelve-year-old princess and heir of the Harmonica Star country. However, one day when the prince of the Tambourine Star country is reported to be missing, Comet, alongside her assistant Rubabou, are tasked to be sent to Earth in hopes for her to find the missing prince with her only clue being "He will be known by the twinkling in his eyes." She made her residence with the Fujiyoshi Family after they took her in and became a babysitter and friend to twins Tsuyoshi and Nene. Using her magic skills, Comet uses it to solve her problems as she navigates herself in Earth, while Princess Meteor, the heiress of the Castanet Star country learns of Comet's orders to find the prince, arrives on Earth planning to marry the prince before Comet gets the chance. The series is set in Kamakura, Kanagawa, Japan.

== Media ==
=== TV drama ===
The original live-action drama series, widely known by fans as "Yumiko Kokonoe's Comet-san" (九重佑三子のコメットさん, Kokonoe Yumiko no Kometto-san), was produced by International Television Films with A Production animating some of its animated segments done by Tsutomu Shibayama and Yoshio Kabashima. It was first broadcast by Tokyo Broadcasting System (TBS) from July 3, 1967, to December 30, 1968, with a total of 79 episodes. Beginning in Episode 49, it became the first live action series to be aired in color.

A second series, known to fans as "Kumiko Ohba's Comet-san" (大場久美子のコメットさん, Ōba Kumiko no Kometto-san) to differentiate it to the first, was produced 10 years after the original. Directed by Noriaki Yuasa and Yoshiharu Tomita, it stars Kumiko Ohba as the titular character, while the story is vastly different from the original series. It aired on Tokyo Broadcasting System from June 12, 1978, to September 24, 1979, with a total of 68 episodes.

=== Manga ===
A short manga adaptation of the first series was serialized in Shueisha's monthly Margaret from July to November 1967, illustrated by Mitsuteru Yokoyama, starting slightly before the first drama series.

=== Anime ===
An anime series titled Cosmic Baton Girl Comet-san (Cosmic Baton Girl コメットさん☆, Cosmic Baton Girl Kometto-san) was animated by Nippon Animation and SynergySP, directed by Mamoru Kanbe and written by Akira Okeya, with character designs done by Kazuaki Makida. The series premiered on TV Osaka and TV Tokyo from April 1, 2001, to January 27, 2002, with a total of 43 episodes. Nayu Nibori performed the first opening theme "Kimi ni Smile" (君にスマイル, Kimi ni sumairu; "Smile for You") while Shizuka Nakayama performed the second theme song "Miracle Power ~Stardust Version~" (ミラクルパワー 〜スターダスト・バージョン〜, Mirakuru pawā 〜 sutādasuto bājon 〜). Saeko Chiba performed the first ending theme "Twinkle☆Star" (トゥインクル☆スター, Touinkuru ☆ sutā) while Sayuri Tanaka performed the second ending theme "Hoshi no Parade☆" (星のパレード☆, Hoshi no parēdo☆; "Parade of Stars☆"). The music is composed by Moka. For audiences outside Japan, the series was licensed by Animax under the title "Princess Comet".

The anime starred Aki Maeda as Comet and Chieko Honda as Meteo.

An associated manga by Sayori Abe was serialised on Shogakukan's educational magazines and a Korean game was made by Sonokong. An officially authorised, fan-operated internet radio, "Hoshi no Ko Internet Radio", aired during the period of broadcast.

==== Episode list ====
No.	Title	Original release date
1	"The One Who Carries the Twinkle of the Stars" "Hoshi no kagayaki o motsu mono" (星の輝きを持つ者)	April 1, 2001
2	"New Home" "Atarashii ie" (新しい家)	April 8, 2001
3	"Tunnel of Stars" "Hoshi no ton'neru" (星のトンネル)	April 15, 2001
4	"Exciting Zoo Trip" "Wakuwaku dōbutsu-en" (わくわく動物園)	April 22, 2001
5	"Slow and Steady Kingdom-Making" "Yukkuri ōkoku-zukuri" (ゆっくり王国づくり)	April 29, 2001
6	"Something to Put in the Store" "O mise ni oku mono" (お店に置くもの)	May 6, 2001
7	"Faeries Living in Radiance" "Kirakira ni sumu yōsei" (キラキラにすむ妖精)	May 13, 2001
8	"Wonderful Dress-Making" "Sutekina doresu-zukuri" (素敵なドレスづくり)	May 20, 2001
9	"Cradle of Clouds" "Kumo no yuri kago" (雲のゆりかご)	May 27, 2001
10	"First Love" "Hajimete no suki" (はじめての好き)	June 3, 2001
11	"The Power of the Baton" "Baton no chikara" (バトンの力)	June 9, 2001
12	"Rababou's Kidnapping Incident" "Rababō yuu kai jiken" (ラバボー ゆうかい事件)	June 17, 2001
13	"Night of the Sewing People" "Nuibito-tachi no yoru" (ヌイビトたちの夜)	June 24, 2001
14	"The Star-Worlds' Tanabata Legend" "Hoshi-koku no tanabata densetsu" (星国の七夕伝説)	July 1, 2001
15	"The Shadow-Person's Challenge" "Kagebito no chōsen" (カゲビトの挑戦)	July 8, 2001
16	"Let's Search for the Palace of the Dragon King" "Ryū Miyagi o sagasou" (竜宮城を探そう)	July 15, 2001
17	"Meteo-san's Tears" "Meteo-san no namida" (メテオさんの涙)	July 22, 2001
18	"The Fighting Robot" "Tatakau robo" (戦うロボ)	July 29, 2001
19	"Another Comet" "Mō ichi-nin no Kometto" (もう一人のコメット)	August 5, 2001
20	"Rabapyon's Kiss" "Rabapyon no kisu" (ラバピョンのキス)	August 12, 2001
21	"The Magical Power of Love" "Mirakuru koi-ryoku" (ミラクル恋力)	August 19, 2001
22	"Rubbabou's desperation" "Zetsubō no Rababō" (ゼツボーのラバボー)	August 26, 2001
23	"Higenoshita's Shine" "Higenoshita no kagayaki" (ヒゲノシタの輝き)	September 2, 2001
24	"The Siblings from Tambourine Star Country" "Tanbarin-boshi-koku no ane otōto" (タンバリン星国の姉弟)	September 9, 2001
25	"The Forgotten Brilliance" "Wasure chatta kagayaki" (忘れちゃった輝き)	September 16, 2001
26	"Please give me Star Power" "Hoshi-ryoku o kudasai" (星力をください)	August 23, 2001
27	"Keisuke's Dream" "Kēsuke no yume no mi" (ケースケの夢の実)	September 30, 2001
28	"How I Can Help" "Otetsudai dekiru koto" (お手伝いできること)	October 7, 2001
29	"The Storm of Castanet" "Kasutanetto-boshi-koku no arashi" (カスタネット星国の嵐)	October 14, 2001
30	"Clay-playing with Star Power" "Hoshi-ryoku de nendo asobi" (星力で粘土あそび)	October 21, 2001
31	"There are many Manebito-san" "Manebito-san ga ippai" (マネビトさんがいっぱい)	October 28, 2001
32	"Nokoshitao-bake arrives" "Nokoshitaobake ga yattekuru" (ノコシタオバケがやってくる)	November 4, 2001
33	"Like a Princess at times" "Tokiniwa ōjo no yō ni" (時には王女のように)	November 11, 2001
34	"Bonds of the Stars" "Hoshi no kizuna" (星の絆)	November 18, 2001
35	"The Snow Dance" "Yuki no dansu" (雪のダンス)	November 25, 2001
36	"Everyone's Prince" "Min'na no ōji-sama" (みんなの王子さま)	December 2, 2001
37	"The Mischevious Cupid" "Itazura Kyūpito" (いたずらキューピト)	December 9, 2001
38	"Misfortune of Feelings" "Kimochi no sainan" (キモチの災難)	December 16, 2001
39	"The Christmas Starman" "Santabito ni naritai" (サンタビトになりたい)	December 23, 2001
40	"The Keisuke who has lost his glow" "Kagayaki o nakushita Kēsuke" (輝きをなくしたケースケ)	December 30, 2001
41	"Someone from Tambourine Star Country" "Tanbarin-boshi-koku no dareka-san" (タンバリン星国の誰かさん)	January 6, 2002
42	"How to say Goodbye" "Sayonara no shikata" (サヨナラの仕方)	January 13, 2002
43	"The Twinkle in the Eye" "Ni utsuru kagayaki" (瞳に映る輝き)	January 20, 2002
