= Gandhara (song) =

Single by Godiego

from the album Magic Monkey
- A-side: "Gandhara"
- B-side: "Celebration"
- Released: October 1, 1978
- Genre: Rock, Ballad
- Label: Nippon Columbia
- Songwriters: Lyrics: Yoko Narahashi (Japanese version: Michio Yamagami), Composition: Yukihide Takekawa

Godiego singles chronology
"Mirage" (1977)	"Gandhara" (1978)	"Monkey Magic" (1978)

"Gandhara" (ガンダーラ, Gandāra) is a song by Japanese rock band Godiego, serving as their 7th single. Referring to the historical Buddhist land on the Indian subcontinent, "Gandhara" was used as the ending theme song for the first season of the television drama Saiyūki (西遊記), known in the English speaking world as Monkey. "Gandhara" was originally released in Japan on October 1, 1978, but it was later released in the United Kingdom in 1980 to coincide with the British broadcast of Monkey. "Gandhara" reached number 2 on both the Oricon and The Best Ten charts in Japan, while the British release reached 56 on the UK Singles Chart.

Godiego recorded the song in both Japanese and English, with a hybrid Japanese & English version being included on the releases in the UK. The entirely English version appears on the album Magic Monkey in Japan.

Gandhara reached #56 on the British pop charts and stayed in its top 100 for seven weeks in 1980.

== Track listing ==
Japanese release

1. "Gandhara" (ガンダーラ, Gandāra)
2. "Celebration" (セレブレーション, Sereburēshon)

British release

1. "Gandhara"
2. "The Birth of the Odyssey ~ Monkey Magic"

== Cover versions ==
- Monkey Majik covered "Gandhara" as one of the tracks on their single "MONKEY MAJIK×MONKEY MAGIC".
- Mone Kamishiraishi covered the song on her 2021 cover album Ano Uta.

== See also ==
- 1978 in Japanese music
