= Yoko Narahashi =

Japanese film producer

- 奈良橋 陽子
- Born: June 17, 1947 (age 79); Ichikawa, Chiba, Japan
- Education: International Christian University
- Occupations: Casting director; film producer; lyricist

Yoko Narahashi (奈良橋 陽子, Narahashi Yõko; born June 17, 1947) is a Japanese casting director, film producer and lyricist. She gained prominence due to her involvement with The Last Samurai, Babel, and Memoirs of a Geisha. The Japan Times, the only independent English-language newspaper in Japan, referred to her as an "all-round interpreter of Japan for U.S. movies".

== Biography ==
Born in Ichikawa, Chiba, Japan, Narahashi moved to Montreal, Quebec, Canada in 1952 at the age of five when her father got a job at the International Civil Aviation Organization. She returned to Japan a decade later to attend International Christian University in Mitaka, Tokyo. In 1967, she returned to New York City where she studied at the Neighborhood Playhouse School of the Theatre .

Returning again to Japan, Narahashi founded two companies. The first was an English conversation school (Eikaiwa), Model Language Studio (MLS), which taught English through theater. The school now has branches in 34 countries. The second was a production and management company, United Performers' Studio (UPS), based on the Actors Studio in New York City. In 1998, she served as the founding director of UPS Academy, a method acting school geared towards foreign actors.

Narahashi was once married to Johnny Nomura, the producer behind the popular Japanese band Godiego. She wrote the lyrics to the songs Gandhara, The Galaxy Express 999 and Holy and Bright, as well as the lyrics for The Glacier Fox soundtrack. Nomura and Narahashi have since been divorced.

== Selected filmography ==
Year	Film	Credits
1976	The Youth Killer	Lyrics
1978	The Glacier Fox	Lyrics
1989	Cipher	Dialogue Director, Dialogue Translator, Interviewer (voice)
1995	The Winds of God	Director (Won "Best New Director" at the Japan Film Critics Awards)
2003	The Last Samurai	Associate Producer, Casting Associate
2005	Memoirs of a Geisha	Actress (Mameha's Maid), Japan Liaison
2006	Babel	Casting Director
2008	The Ramen Girl	Casting Director
2012	Emperor	Producer
2013	47 Ronin	Casting Associate
2013	The Wolverine	Casting Director
2024	Touch	Actress (Miko)
