= Monkey (TV series) =

Japanese television drama

- Top: The Japanese title card for Monkey, reading Journey to the West; Bottom: The title card used in the English-language dub
- Also known as: Monkey (UK)
- 西遊記; Saiyūki
- Genre: Action; Adventure; Comedy; Fantasy; Shenmo
- Based on: Journey to the West by Wu Cheng'en
- Written by: Motomu Furuta; Hiroichi Fuse; Hirokazu Fuse; James Miki; Moto Nagai; Yooichi Onaka; Mamoru Sasaki; Eizaburo Shiba; Yu Tagami; Kei Tasaka; Mutsuo Yamashita
- Directed by: Toshi Aoki; Jun Fukuda; Kazuo Ikehiro; Yusuke Watanabe; Daisuke Yamazaki; Yoshiyuki Kuroda
- Starring: Masaaki Sakai; Masako Natsume; Shiro Kishibe; Toshiyuki Nishida; Tonpei Hidari; Shunji Fujimura
- Voices of: UK dub: Burt Kwouk (Note: Kwouk was only involved in the 2004 dubs of the thirteen "missing" episodes.); David Collings; Maria Warburg; Peter Woodthorpe; Gareth Armstrong; Miriam Margolyes; Andrew Sachs
- Theme music composer: Mickie Yoshino
- Opening theme: "Monkey Magic" by Godiego
- Ending theme: "Gandhara" by Godiego (s1); "Holy and Bright" by Godiego (s2)
- Country of origin: Japan
- Original language: Japanese
- No. of seasons: 2
- No. of episodes: 52 (list of episodes)

Production
- Producers: Teisho Arikawa; Tsuneo Hayakawa; Yoji Katori; Ken Kumagaya; Kazuo Morikawa; Tadahiro Nagatomi; Muneo Yamada
- Production companies: Nippon Television; International Television Films

Original release
- Network: NNS (NTV)
- Release: 2 October 1978 – 4 May 1980

Saiyūki (西遊記; lit. 'Account of the Journey to the West'), (titled Monkey in English, but often referred to as Monkey Magic due to the lyrics of its title music), is a Japanese television drama based on the 16th-century Chinese novel Journey to the West by Wu Cheng'en. Filmed in Northwest China and Inner Mongolia, the show was produced by Nippon Television and International Television Films and was broadcast from 1978 to 1980 on NTV and its affiliates.

== Plot summary ==
Monkey (孫悟空, Son Gokū), the title character, is described in the theme song as being "born from an egg on a mountain top", a stone egg, and thus he is a stone monkey, a skilled fighter who becomes a brash king of a monkey tribe, who, the song goes on to claim, was "the punkiest monkey that ever popped". He achieved a little enlightenment, and proclaimed himself "Great Sage, Equal of Heaven". After demanding the "gift" of a magical staff from a powerful dragon king, and to quiet the din of his rough antics on Earth, Monkey is approached by Heaven to join their host, first in the lowly position of Master of the Stable (manure disposal), and then—after his riotous complaints—as "Keeper of the Peach Garden of Immortality".

Monkey eats many of the peaches, which have taken millennia to ripen, becomes immortal and runs amok. Having earned the ire of Heaven and being beaten in a challenge by an omniscient, mighty, but benevolent, cloud-dwelling Buddha (釈迦如来, Shakanyorai), Monkey is imprisoned for 500 years under a mountain in order to learn patience.

Eventually, Monkey is released by the monk Tripitaka (三蔵法師, Sanzōhōshi), who has been tasked by the Boddhisatva Guanyin (観世音菩薩, Kanzeon Bosatsu) to undertake a pilgrimage from China to India to fetch holy scriptures (implied to be the region of Gandhāra in the song over the closing credits). The pair soon recruit two former members of the Heavenly Host who were cast out and turned from angels to "monsters" as a result of Monkey's transgressions: Sandy (沙悟浄, Sa Gojō), the water monster and ex-cannibal, expelled from Heaven after his interference caused Heaven's Jade Emperor's (天帝, Tentei; Shangdi) precious jade cup to be broken (his birth name is also later revealed to be Shao Chin, having been abducted as a child, but meets his long-lost father, in "The Beginning of Wisdom"), and Pigsy (猪八戒, Cho Hakkai), a pig monster consumed with lust and gluttony, who was expelled from Heaven after harassing the Star Princess Vega—the Jade Emperor's mistress—for a kiss.

A dragon, Yu Lung (玉龍, Gyokuryū), who was set free by Guanyin after being sentenced to death, eats Tripitaka's horse. On discovering that the horse was tasked with carrying Tripitaka, it assumes the horse's shape to carry the monk on his journey. Later in the story he occasionally assumes human form to assist his new master, although he is still always referred to as "Horse".

Monkey can also change form, for instance into a hornet. In Episode 3, The Great Journey Begins, Monkey transforms into a girl to trick Pigsy. Monkey's other magic powers include: summoning a cloud upon which he can fly; his use of the magic wishing staff which he can shrink and grow at will and from time to time, when shrunk, store in his ear, and which he uses as a weapon; and the ability to conjure monkey warriors by blowing on hairs plucked from his chest.

The pilgrims face many perils and antagonists both human, such as Emperor Taizong of Tang (太宗皇帝, Taisōkōtei) and supernatural. Monkey, Sandy and Pigsy are often called upon to battle demons, monsters and bandits, despite Tripitaka's constant call for peace. Many episodes also feature some moral lesson, usually based upon Buddhist and/or Confucianist, Taoist philosophies, which are elucidated by the narrator at the end of various scenes.

== Cast and characters ==
Character	Character Actor	Dub Actor	Original Chinese name	Japanese name
Monkey	Masaaki Sakai	David Collings	Sun Wukong	Son Gokū
Tripitaka	Masako Natsume	Maria Warburg	Tang Sanzang	Sanzō hōshi (Genjō Sanzō)
Sandy	Shiro Kishibe	Gareth Armstrong	Sha Wujing	Sa Gojō
Pigsy	s1: Toshiyuki Nishida s2: Tonpei Hidari	Peter Woodthorpe	Zhu Bajie	Cho Hakkai
Yu Lung/"Horse"	Shunji Fujimura	Andrew Sachs	Bai Long Ma	Gyokuryū

== Broadcast history ==
Two 26-episode seasons ran in Japan: the first season ran from October 1978 to April 1979, and the second one from November 1979 to May 1980, with screenwriters including Mamoru Sasaki, Isao Okishima, Tetsurō Abe, Kei Tasaka, James Miki, Motomu Furuta, Hiroichi Fuse, Yū Tagami and Fumio Ishimori.

Saiyūki was dubbed into English from 1979, with dialogue written by David Weir. The dubbed version was broadcast under the name Monkey and broadcast in the United Kingdom by the British Broadcasting Corporation, in New Zealand by Television New Zealand and in Australia by the Australian Broadcasting Commission. Only 39 of the original 52 episodes were originally dubbed and broadcast by the BBC: all 26 of series 1 and 13 of series 2. In 2004, the remaining 13 episodes were dubbed by Fabulous Films Ltd using the original voice acting cast, following a successful release of the English-dubbed series on VHS and DVD; later, these newly dubbed episodes were broadcast by Channel 4 in the UK.

A Spanish-dubbed version of Monkey aired in Mexico, Costa Rica, Peru, Argentina, Uruguay and the Dominican Republic in the early 1980s. While the BBC-dubbed Monkey never received a broadcast in the United States, the original Japanese-language version, Saiyūki, was shown on local Japanese-language television stations in California and Hawaii in the early 1980s. It once aired in China, but it was cancelled after the third episode due to it being criticized for straying too far from the original source material.

== Episode list ==
=== Season 1 ===
1. Monkey Goes Wild About Heaven
2. Monkey Turns Nursemaid
3. The Great Journey Begins
4. Monkey Swallows the Universe
5. The Power of Youth
6. Even Monsters Can Be People
7. The Beginning of Wisdom
8. Pigsy Woos A Widow
9. What Monkey Calls The Dog-Woman
10. Pigsy's in The Well
11. The Difference Between Night And Day
12. Pearls Before Swine
13. The Minx and the Slug
14. Catfish, Saint and the Shape-Changer
15. Monkey Meets The Demon Digger
16. The Most Monstrous Monster
17. Truth and the Grey Gloves Devil
18. Land for the Locusts
19. Vampire Master
20. Outrageous Coincidences
21. Pigsy, King and God
22. Village of the Undead
23. Two Little Blessings
24. The Fires of Jealousy
25. The Country of Nightmares
26. The End of The Way

=== Season 2 ===
1. Pigsy's Ten Thousand Ladies
2. The Dogs of Death
3. You Win Some, You Lose Some
4. Pigsy Learns a Lesson
5. The Land With Two Suns
6. The House of the Evil Spirit
7. Am I Dreaming?
8. The Tormented Emperor
9. Between Heaven And Hell
10. The Foolish Philosopher
11. Who Am I?
12. What is Wisdom?
13. The Fountain of Youth
14. Better The Demon You Know
15. A Shadow So Huge
16. Keep on Dancing
17. Give and Take
18. Such A Nice Monster
19. The Fake Pilgrims
20. Pretty As a Picture
21. Mothers
22. The Tenacious Tomboy
23. Stoned
24. Hungry Like The Wolf
25. Monkey's Yearning
26. At the Top of The Mountain

Half of series 2 was not originally dubbed into English, but was dubbed later in 2004 with as much of the original cast as possible. The translation and voicing of the subsequent English voice dub is less erudite and humorous than the original effort; and includes some swear words that feel out of place in the context of the original. The voice of Pigsy is slurred in parts—perhaps reflecting the age and health of the voice actor decades later.

3. You Win Some, You Lose Some
4. Pigsy Learns a Lesson
5. The Land With Two Suns
6. The House of the Evil Spirit
7. Am I Dreaming?
8. The Tormented Emperor
9. Between Heaven And Hell
14. Better The Demon You Know
19. The Fake Pilgrims
22. The Tenacious Tomboy
23. Stoned
24. Hungry Like The Wolf
25. Monkey's Yearning

== Soundtrack ==
The songs in the series were performed by the five-piece Japanese band Godiego. In Japan, the first series' ending theme "Gandhara" (ガンダーラ, Gandāra), which was named after the ancient kingdom of Gandhara, was released by Columbia Music Entertainment on 1 October 1978, backed with "Celebration". This was followed by the release of the opening theme "Monkey Magic" on 25 December 1978, with "A Fool" on the B-side. Godiego also released the soundtrack album Magic Monkey on 25 October 1978, comprising all of the songs that the band had composed for the first series.

The album became one of the group's highest-charting releases, staying at #1 on the Oricon chart for a total of eight weeks from January through March 1979 (it was unseated for most of January by the Japanese release of Grease: The Original Soundtrack from the Motion Picture), and it was ultimately the #1 LP for 1979. For the second series, the ending theme of "Gandhara" was replaced with "Holy and Bright", which was released on 1 October 1979 (the two sides of the single featured a Japanese-language version on one side and an English-language version on the other).

In the UK, BBC Records released "Gandhara" as a single in 1979 (RESL 66), with both "The Birth of the Odyssey" and "Monkey Magic" on the B-side. The single reached #56 on the UK singles chart, eventually spending a total of seven weeks on the chart. A second BBC single was released in 1980 (RESL 81), this time featuring an edited version of "Monkey Magic", along with "Gandhara" and "Thank You Baby", but this single failed to chart. The BBC releases of "Gandhara" have one verse sung in Japanese and the other in English. BBC Records also released the Magic Monkey album under the simplified title of Monkey (REB 384) in 1980 but it failed to chart.

Masaaki Sakai, who plays Monkey in the series, also performed several of the songs for the series: "SONGOKU", "Ima de wa Oso Sugiru" (今では遅すぎる; "It's Too Late"), "Kono Michi no Hatemademo" (この道の果てまでも; "To the End of the Road"), a Japanese version of Godiego's "Thank You Baby", and "20 Oku Nen no Kurayami" (20億年の暗闇; "Two Billion Years of Darkness").

== Legacy ==
Monkey is considered a cult classic in countries where it has been shown, reaching as far as South America. Among the features that have contributed to its cult appeal are the theme song, the dubbed dialogue spoken in a variety of over-the-top "oriental" accents, the reasonably good synchronization of dubbing to the actors' original dialogue, the memorable battles which were for many Western youngsters their first exposure to Asian-style fantasy action sequences, and the fact that the young male priest Tripitaka is played by a woman.

In 1981, the Australian Broadcasting Corporation debuted the BBC-dubbed Monkey at 6 p.m. on week-nights. Since then, the show has been frequently repeated on the ABC, notably during the contemporary youth TV show Recovery which aired episodes of Monkey weekly from July 1999 to April 2000. When Recovery was put on hiatus, it was replaced with three hours of Monkey. The radio station Triple J often made references to Monkey and interviewed the original BBC voice actors on several occasions.

The British indie-pop band Monkey Swallows the Universe took their name from an episode of Monkey.

Starting from 21 September 2024, the then-recently launched Freeview channel Rewind TV started airing repeats of Monkey.

== See also ==
- List of media adaptations of Journey to the West
- Monkey (novel)
- The New Legends of Monkey (2018 TV series reboot)
