= Mickie Yoshino =

Japanese keyboard player and producer (born 1951)

- ミッキー吉野
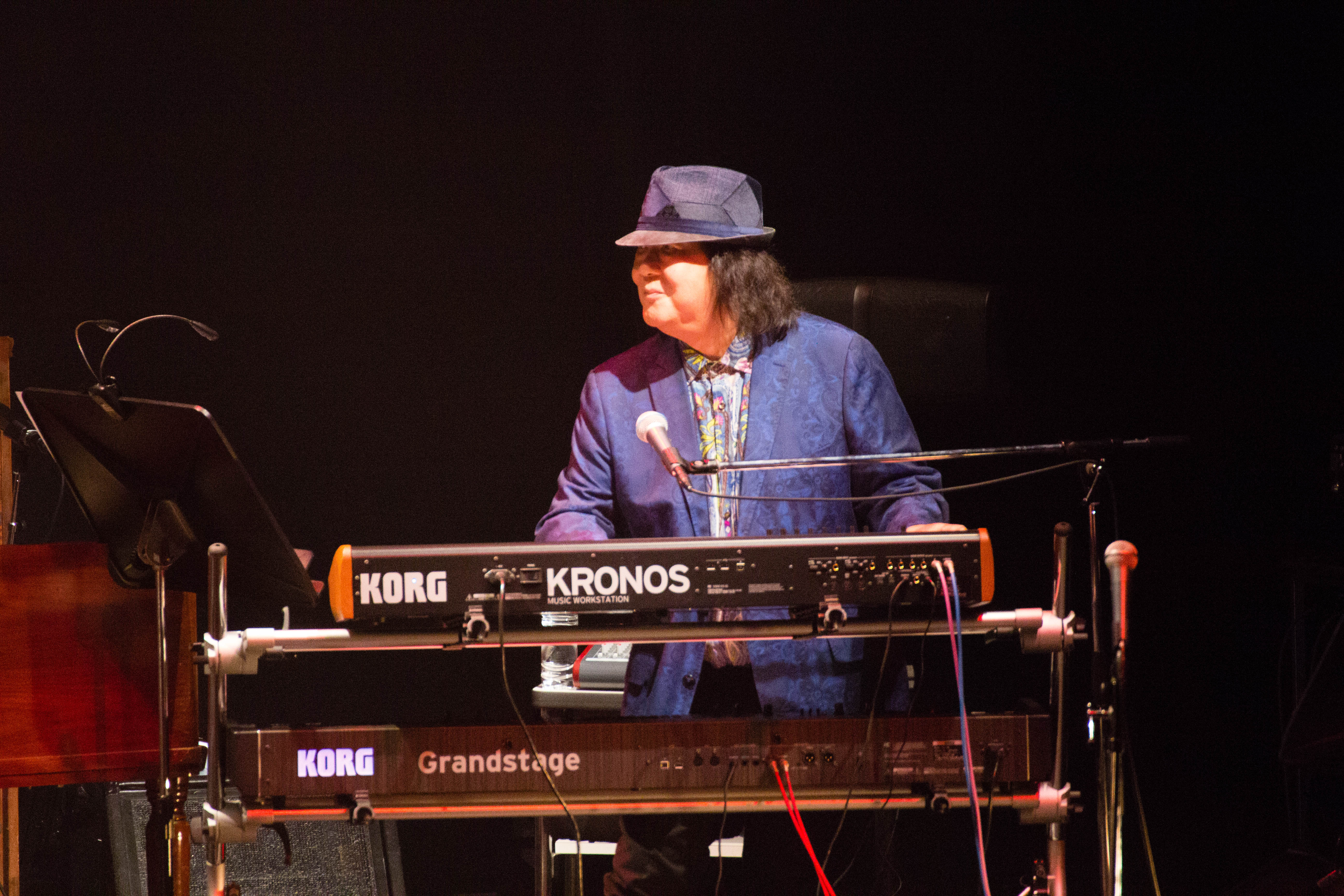
- Yoshino in 2018
- Born: Mitsuyoshi Yoshino; 13 December 1951 (age 74); Yokohama, Kanagawa, Japan
- Education: Berklee College of Music
- Occupations: Musician; songwriter; keyboardist
- Years active: 1968–present
- Musical career
- Genres: Rock; pop; blues rock; jazz; jazz fusion
- Instrument: Keyboards
- Label: Nippon Columbia
- Member of: Godiego; EnTRANS
- Formerly of: The Golden Cups; Flesh & Blood
- Website: mickieyoshino.com

Mitsuyoshi Yoshino (吉野 光義, Yoshino Mitsuyoshi; born 13 December 1951), known professionally as Mickie Yoshino (ミッキー吉野, Mikkī Yoshino), is a Japanese keyboardist, composer, producer, and arranger. Yoshino is known for leading the rock band Godiego. In 2005, he won a Japan Academy Prize for his music. Yoshino's compositions were used in the film Swing Girls (Altamira Pictures). Yoshino still produces music with groups such as Godiego and EnTRANS.

== Biography ==
=== Early years and The Golden Cups ===
Yoshino's musical career began when he was a junior in high school, playing in night clubs and the U.S. military base in Yokohama, Japan. In 1967, at the age of 16, he became a member of The Golden Cups, a pioneering Japanese blues band that released several popular hits. After leaving the band in 1971, he studied music at the Berklee College of Music in Boston. While there, he studied piano with Charlie Banacos, Dean Earl, Ray Santisi, and Edward C.Bedner. He also performed arrangements with Gary Burton and Phil Wilson. Yoshino formed the group Flesh & Blood (a.k.a. "Dutch Baker") and played in the Boston rock scene at the same time as Aerosmith and Boston.

=== Godiego ===
After graduating from Berklee, Yoshino returned to Japan to form the group Godiego (pronounced Go-Dai-Go).

Godiego appeared frequently on the hit charts from 1978 through the mid-1980s and is credited with influencing the Japanese pop scene.

In the United Kingdom, Godiego became known for the theme song of the BBC TV series The Water Margin. The song reached number 16 on the UK singles chart. Satril Records released the album The Water Margin in the UK and Europe. Godiego's biggest hits in Japan came from a TV series called Monkey, which also aired on the BBC. This series became a "cult Japanese TV series" with videos and DVDs sold not only in the UK but in Australia, New Zealand, South Africa and other countries. "Gandhara" and "Monkey Magic" were the most well-known songs from the TV series. Godiego also attracted international attention when they wrote and released "Beautiful Name", the theme song for Unicef's International Year of the Child.

Yoshino also wrote and played for soundtracks such as the film House. Francis Ford Coppola intended to select Japanese composer Isao Tomita for his movie Apocalypse Now, but this was prevented due to a label contracts issue, and Tomita had been planning to let Godiego record the rock part of the soundtrack.

Yoshino was also very involved with Roland Corp. in the development of synthesizers and digital stage pianos in the 1970s and 1980s. Godiego was one of the first rock bands to use a guitar synthesizer for both recordings and live performances.

In 1980, Godiego was the first rock group to perform in China. They also performed for 60,000 people in Kathmandu, Nepal, and performed in Australia and the United States. Around 1985, Godiego broke up. In 1999/2000, they reunited for a 17-concert nationwide tour.

=== 1980s–1990s ===
In the late 1980s, Yoshino helped to establish the PAN School of Music in Tokyo and Yokohama. He also released his own albums American Road and Longway from Home, and worked with many musicians including Paul Jackson, Jennifer Batten, Peter Green and Ray Parker Jr., Kenichi Hagiwara, and Shuichi Hidano.

=== EnTRANS and jazz/fusion activities ===
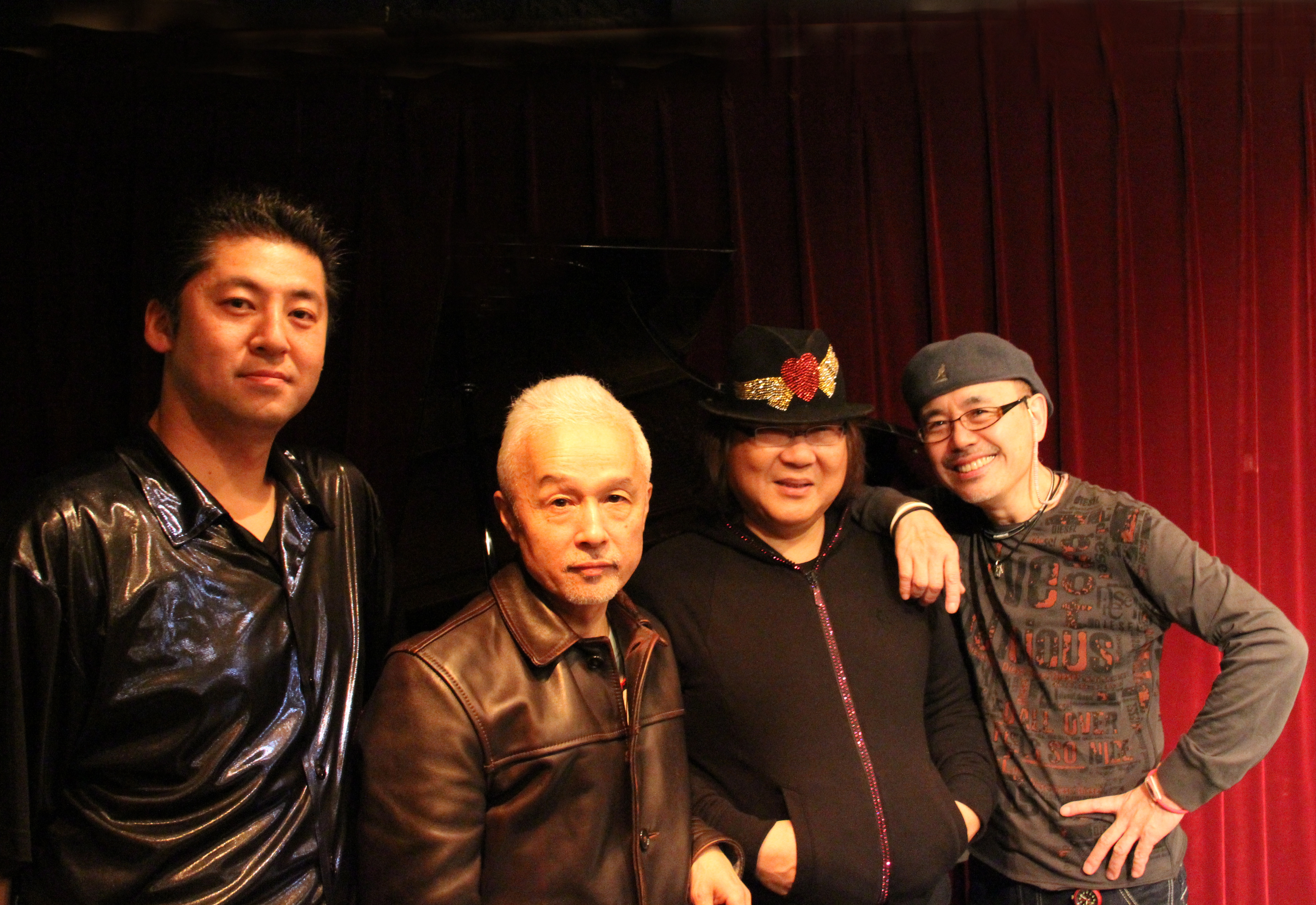
EnTRANS at Kamome, Yokohama, in 2012

Yoshino has participated in diverse musical activities since the 1960s. He joined the Time is Now jazz and rock crossover concert with the Terumasa Hino Quintet, Hiroshi Kamayatsu, and Takayuki Inoue in 1969. With Godiego, Yukihide Takekawa and he composed "Suite: Peace" inspired by the theme of Edward Elgar's Pomp & Circumstance No.1 in 1977, and "In You Kanjincho" based upon Nagauta, Japanese traditional music, and Kanjincho. Yoshino arranged a rock tune with horns and traditional Japanese musical instruments such as the shamisen, shakuhachi, biwa and tsuzumi in 1981.

He formed a crossover musical group called EnTRANS with Takayuki Inoue, Yoshihiro Naruse (Casiopea 3rd), Nobuo Yagi (blues harp) and Shuichi Hidano (Taiko drums). Inonu retired in 2009, but the band continues to perform. Since the 2000s, Yoshino has frequently played with the jazz musicians Kenji Hino and Masa Kohama.

=== The Golden Cups reunion ===
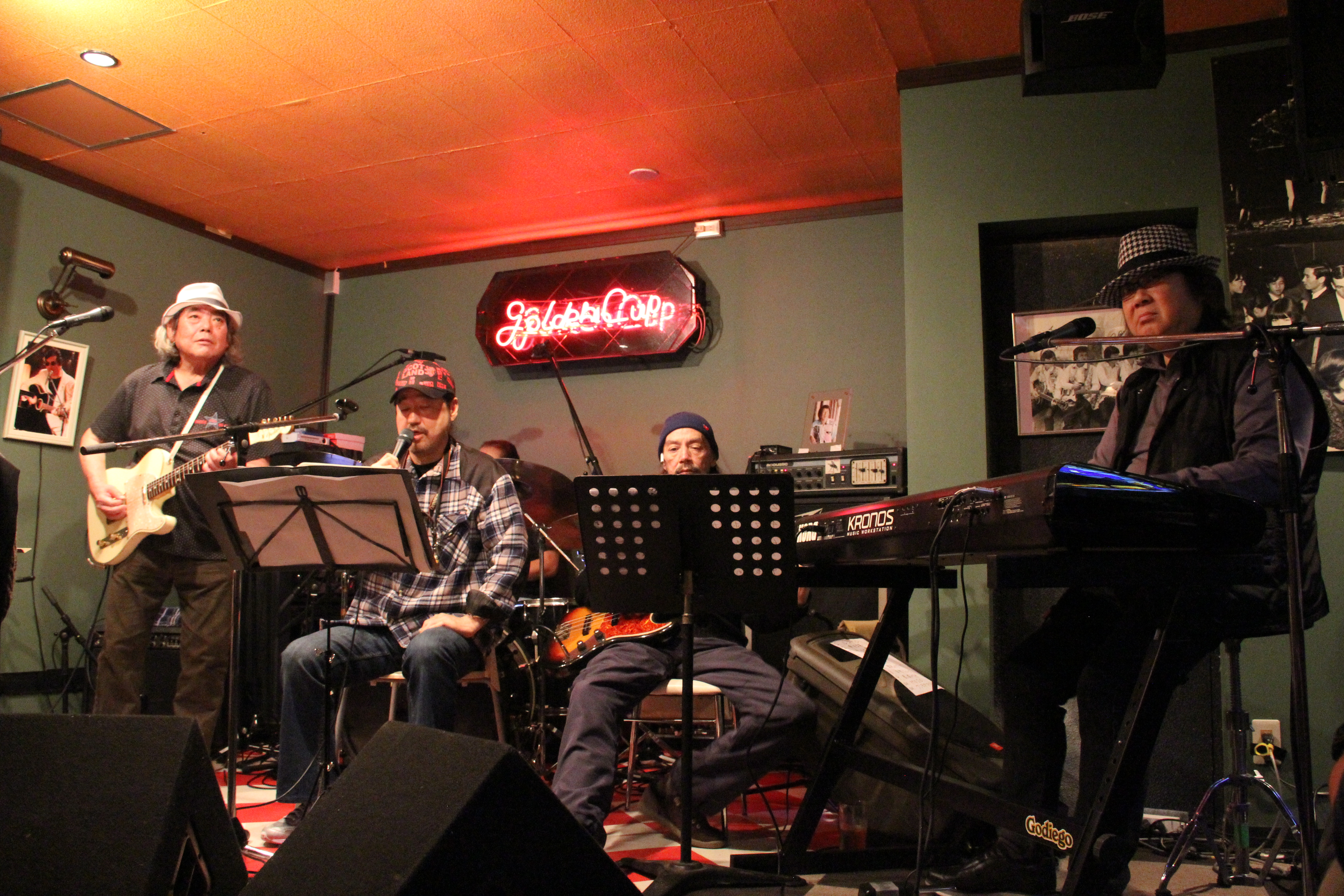
The Golden Cups at Honmoku Golden Cup, 2013

In the early 2000s, Yoshino participated in the reunion of the Golden Cups and a documentary film, The Golden Cups One More Time, which was produced by Altamira Pictures. The movie showed the band's influence on many Japanese rock players, such as Kiyoshiro Imawano, Akiko Yano, Takayuki Inoue, and Ken Yokoyama.

=== Go-Die-Go's Endless Journey ===
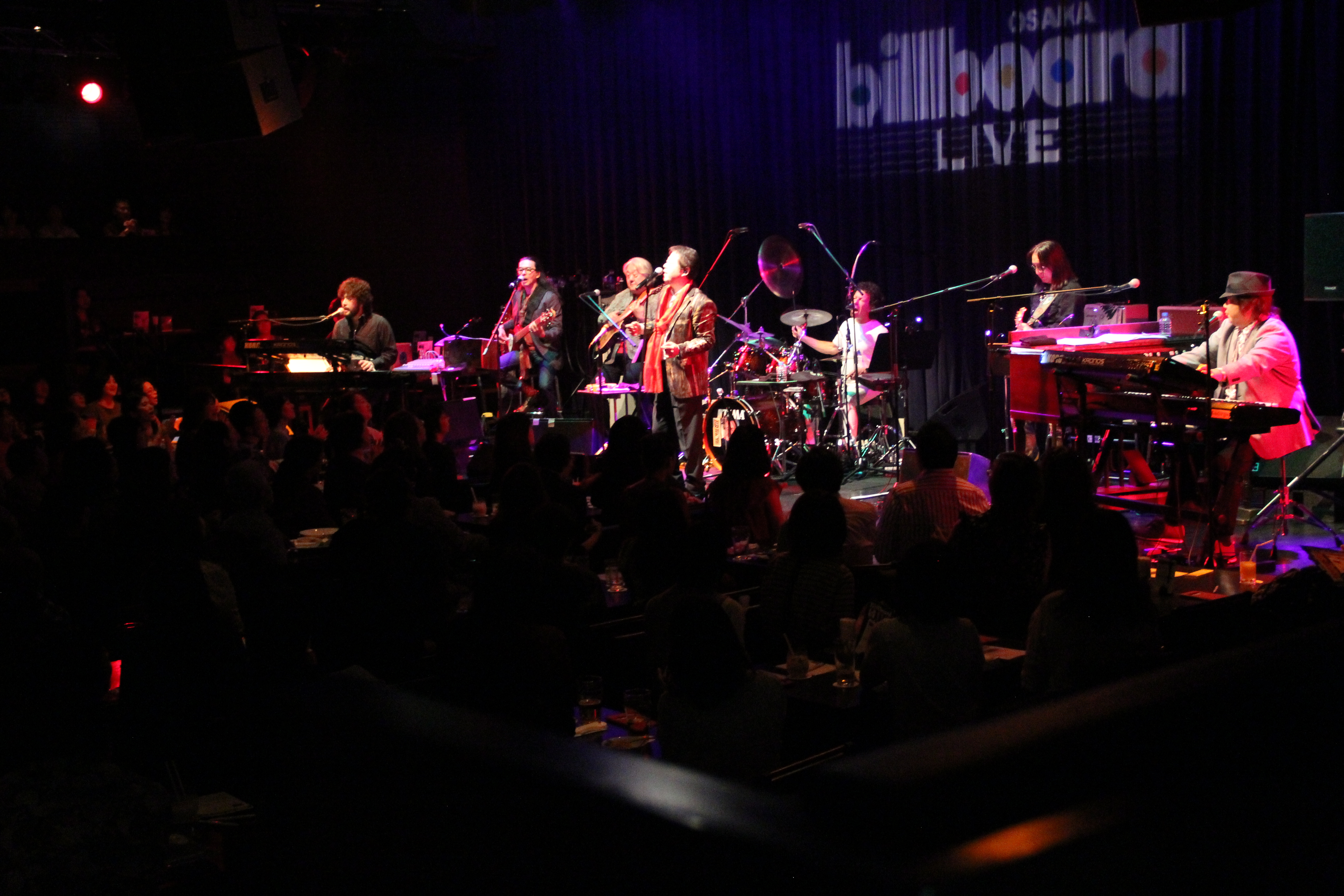
Godiego at Billboard Live Osaka in 2015

Yoshino reformed Godiego in 2006 with the popular members Yukihide Takekawa, Takami Asano, Steve Fox, and Tommy Snyder. They had a three-year series of concerts for Tokyo Metropolitan Art Space, 2007–2009. In 2014, Yoji Yoshizawa joined the band, and they continue to tour, releasing CDs and DVDs.

== Bands ==
Sources:

- Saburos (1965)
- J.Walker & Pedestrians (1965)
- Shuson Konno & New Camelias (1966)
- Chosen Few (1966)
- Midnight Express Blues Band (196–1967)
- BeBes (1967)
- Flower Creation (1968)
- The Golden Cups (1968–1970, 2004–)
- Mickie Yoshino Group Mark I (1970)
- Sunrise (1970–1971)
- Funky Tongue (1971)
- Rapscallion (1972)
- Flesh & Blood (1972–1973)
- Dutch Baker Band(1973–1974)
- Mickie Yoshino Group Mark II (1974)
- Mickie Yoshino Group Mark III (1974)
- Mickie Yoshino Group Mark IV (1975)
- Mickie Yoshino Group Mark V (1975)
- Godiego (1976–1985, 1999–2001, 2006–)
- Mickie Yoshino Group Mark VI (1976)
- Mickie Yoshino Group Mark VII (1977–1978)
- Kaleidoscope Session Band Rock Session (1977)
- Kaleidoscope Session Band Jazz Session (1977)
- PAN (1983–1986)
- Debut! (1983–1986)
- Andre Marlrau Band (1985–1990)
- Black, Yellow & White (1986)
- P.S.M. All Stars (1987–1988)
- Paul Jackson Band (1987–1988)
- Mickie Yoshino Special Band (1987–1988)
- Mickie Yoshino & SLYME (1987–1988)
- Mickie Yoshino Band (1992)
- Earthmatics (1994)
- Valco (1995)
- Joe Yamanaka Band (2000–2006)
- EnTRANS (2001–)
- Silver Cups (a.k.a., Yokohama Super Session Band) (2010–)
- Natsuno-Gumi (2010–)
- Mickie Yoshino New Group (2010–2011)

== Discography ==
=== The Golden Cups ===
==== Studio albums ====
- The Golden Cups Album Vol. 2 (1968)
- Blues Message The Golden Cups Album Vol. 3 (1969)
- The Fifth Generation (1971)

==== Live albums ====
- Super Live Session (1969)
- The Golden Cups Recital (1969)
- One More Time (2014)

==== Singles ====
- "My Love Only For You" (愛する君に; 1968)
- "Good Bye My Love" (過ぎ去りし恋; 1968)
- "Honmoku Blues" (本牧ブルース; 1969)
- "Lucille" (ルシール; 1969)
- "Butterfly Won't Fly" (蝶は飛ばない; 1969)
- "Bitter Tears" (にがい涙; 1970)

==== Compilations ====
- The Best of The Golden Cups (ザ・ゴールデン・カップスのすべて; 1969)
- Girl With Long Hair - The Best of The Golden Cups (長い髪の少女 ザ・ゴールデン・カップスのすべて; 1969)
- Rock 'n Roll Jam '70 (1970)
- Blues of Life (2004)

=== Godiego ===
See Godiego Discography

=== Tigers Memorial Club Band ===
==== Studio albums ====
- Tigers Memorial Club Band (タイガース・メモリアル・クラブバンド; 1988)
- Tigers Memorial Club Band II -Me and Our Summer (タイガース・メモリアル・クラブバンド 僕と僕らの夏; 1994)

==== Singles ====
- "Natsukashiki Love Song" (懐かしきラブソング; 1988)
- "Kimiyo Megami no Mamade" (君よ女神のままで; 1990)

=== EnTRANS ===
==== Studio albums ====
- Be Our Guest!!!! (2016)

==== Live albums ====
- We, Us (2009)

=== Solo, session and small unit ===
==== Studio albums ====
- Zan-Sonezakishinju (残・曾根崎心中; 1975) as Mickie Yoshino Group with Hanayagi Genshu
- Kaleidoscope (1978) with Kazumi Watanabe
- American Road (1986)
- P.S.M. All Stars Vol.1 (1987) as P.S.M. All Stars
- Longway From Home (1988)
- BOUE (1991)
- Come Back My Bay Blues (1993) as Valco
- In The Book of Heaven (1994) as The Spirit of Godiego
- Earthmatics (Godiego-Ki) (ゴダイゴ記; 1996)
- Pop Art Music (1998)
- ART, ART, ART, FOR THE EARTH FROM MY HEART (original tracks "R" "B" "G"; 1998)
- ME & 70's (2008)
- Jazz for Kids (2014) with Paul Jackson
- Tung Fat Heavens and Sweets (2016) as Tung Fat Heavens and Sweets
- 1970 (2017)

==== Live Album ====
- 1974 One Step Festival (2019) as Mickie Yoshino Group

==== Singles ====
- Baby Hold On (1971) as Sunrise
- Return to China (1994)
- Aisuru Kanatahe (Long way from home) (愛する彼方へ; 1995)
- Yes, I Will (なつの組; 1995) as Natsuno-Gumi
- Get Wild (2016)
- Otokotachi no Tabiji (男たちの旅路; 2017) as Mickie Yoshino Group

==== Soundtrack albums ====
- Virgin Blues (バージンブルース; 1974) with Yukihide Takekawa
- Iroha No I (いろはの"い"; 1976) as Godiego
- The Youth Killer (青春の殺人者; 1976)
- House (ハウス; 1977) as Godiego with Asei Kobayashi
- Little Superman Ganbaron (ちいさなスーパーマン ガンバロン; 1977)
- The Glacier Fox (Documentary) (キタキツネ物語; 1977) as Godiego with Masaru Sato
- Hitoha Sorewo Scandal Toyu (人はそれをスキャンダルと言う; 1977)
- Monkey (西遊記; 1978)
- Kamisama Naze Ainimo Kokkyo Ga Aruno (神様なぜ愛にも国境があるの; 1979)
- Otokotachi no Tabiji (男たちの旅路; 1979) as Mickie Yoshino Group
- Magic Capsule (マジック・カプセル; 1979)
- Haruka Naru Souro (遥かなる走路; 1980) as Godiego
- Urusei Yatsura3 Remember My Love (うる星やつら 3 リメンバー・マイ・ラブ]; 1985)
- Kids (キッズ; 1985)
- Let's Gotokuji! (Let's 豪徳寺！; 1987)
- Neo Tokyo (迷宮物語; 1987)
- Spirit Warrior (孔雀王; 1988)
- Dragon Quest (ドラゴンクエスト; 1989)
- Tigers Memorial Club Band (タイガースメモリアルクラブバンド ぼくと、ぼくらの夏; 1990)
- Turn (ターン; 2001)
- Swing Girls (スウィングガールズ; 2004)
- Happy Flight (ハッピー・フライト; 2008)
- The Youth Killer (青春の殺人者; 2010)
- Robo-G (ロボジー; 2012)
- Hitoha Sorewo Scandal Toyu (人はそれをスキャンダルと言う; 2014)
- Happy Wedding (ハッピー・ウェディング]; 2015)
- The Seal of the Sun (太陽の蓋; 2016)

==== Video, LD and DVD ====
- Above Los Angeles (1988)
- Bali (1990)
- Sound Journey Mickie Yoshino Palau~Cruising of rock island~ (2002)
- Sound Journey Mickie Yoshino Alaska~Glacier and Forest~ (2002)
- Sound Journey Mickie Yoshino present Genta Ueki Gold Coast~the Earth~ (2002)

==== Books ====
- They are our ROOTS! From GS Golden Cups to Godiego (僕らのルーツはこれだ! GSゴールデンカップスからゴダイゴ; 2012) with Takami Asano and Rokusaisha, ISBN 978-4846308537)
- Mickie Yoshino no Tabi no Tomodachi (ミッキー吉野の人生(たび)の友だち; 2015), Shinko Music, ISBN 978-4401641833
