= Godiego =

Japanese band

GODIEGO ゴダイゴ
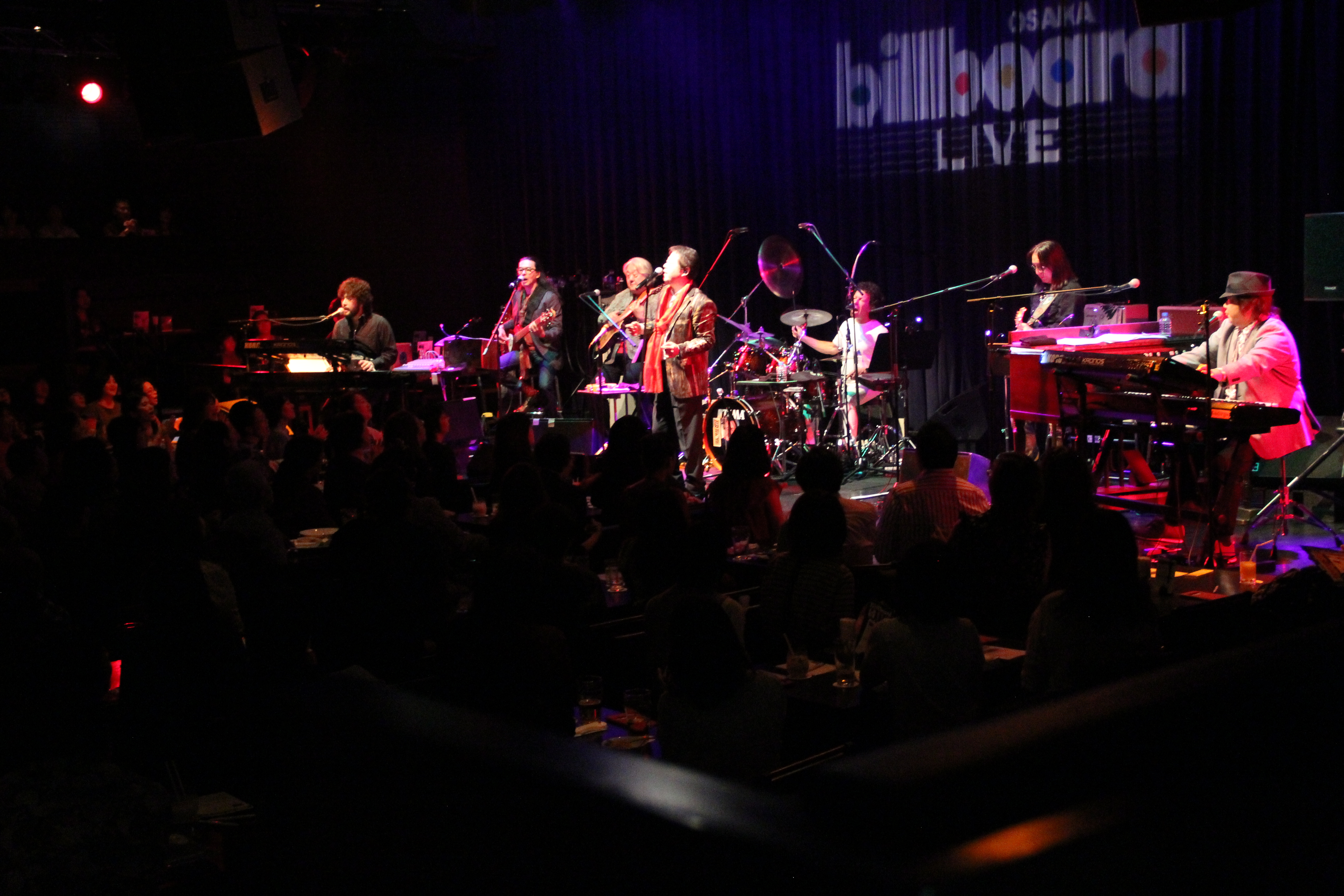
- Godiego at Billboard Live Osaka 2015

Background information
- Origin: Japan
- Genres: Psychedelic rock; pop rock; folk rock; progressive rock; new wave
- Years active: 1975–1985; 1999–2000; 2006–present
- Labels: Nayutawave Records; Nippon Columbia
- Members: Steve Fox; Yukihide Takekawa; Mickie Yoshino; Tommy Snyder; Yōji Yoshizawa
- Past members: Takami Asano; Yūjin Harada; Ryōji Asano
- Website: godiego.co.jp (in Japanese)

Godiego (ゴダイゴ, Godaigo) is a Japanese rock band founded in 1975, originally consisting of Yukihide Takekawa (lead vocals), Mickie Yoshino (keyboards), Takami Asano (guitar), Steve Fox (bass guitar), and Yujin Harada (drums). The band released its first self-titled album in 1976, with Takami's brother, Ryōji Asano, replacing Harada as drummer. By 1977, Ryōji left and was replaced by American drummer Tommy Snyder.

They are perhaps best known for performing the song "Monkey Magic" for the 1978 television series Saiyūki which was brought over to the United Kingdom as Monkey. This led to several releases through BBC Records, including "Monkey Magic", "Gandhara", and the LP Magic Monkey and several of their records charted in the UK. Their theme from The Water Margin was their sole UK Top 40 hit. Godiego are also known for performing the theme song "The Galaxy Express 999" for the film Galaxy Express 999 and the soundtracks for the 1977 film House and the 1978 documentary The Glacier Fox. They were the first rock band to play in the People's Republic of China and Nepal, and inspired the name for the band Monkey Majik (the group's original drummer was British and watched the show as a child). Lead guitarist Takami Asano worked on the soundtrack of the Nintendo DS game Shin Megami Tensei: Devil Survivor, while vocalist Yukihide Takekawa composed the soundtrack for the Super NES video game Soul Blazer. As of 2024, Godiego has released 27 singles and 55 albums in Japan, with lyrics written variably in English by longtime collaborator lyricist Yoko Narahashi.

== Members ==
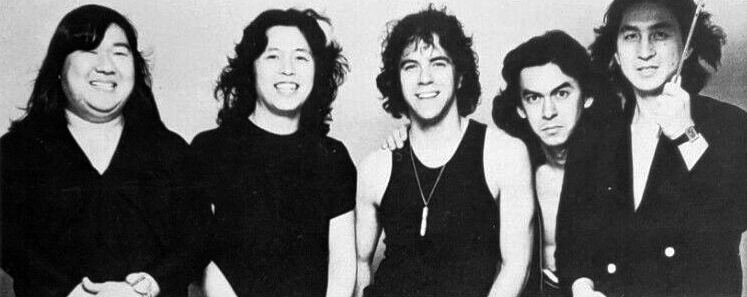
Godiego in 1979

Current members

- Steve Fox – bass, backing vocals (1975–1980, 1999–present)
- Yukihide Takekawa – lead and backing vocals, keyboards, mellotron (1975–present)
- Mickie Yoshino – keyboards, saxophone, backing vocals (1975–present)
- Tommy Snyder – drums, flute, backing and lead vocals (1977–present)
- Yōji Yoshizawa – bass, guitar, backing vocals (1980–1985, 2014–present)

Former members

- Takami Asano – guitar, guitar synthesizer, backing vocals (1975–2020; his death)
- Yūjin Harada – drums (1975)
- Ryōji Asano – drums (1976–1977; touring guest 2015)

== Discography ==
=== Singles ===
- "Salad Girl" (僕のサラダガール, Boku no Sarada Gāru; 1976)
- "Buddy" (いろはの"い", Iroha no "I"; 1976)
- "Symphonica" (シンフォニカ, Shinfonika; 1977)
- "House–Love Theme" (ハウスのふたり〜ハウス・愛のテーマ〜, Hausu no Futari ~Hausu Ai no Tēma~; 1977)
- "Cherries Were Made for Eating" (君は恋のチェリー, Kimi wa Koi no Cherī; 1977)
- "The Water Margin" (1977)
- "Mirage" (ミラージュのテーマ, Mirāju no Tēma; 1978)
- "Gandhara" (ガンダーラ, Gandāra; 1978)
- "Monkey Magic" (モンキー・マジック, Monkī Majikku; 1978)
- "Every Child Has a Beautiful Name" (ビューティフル・ネーム, Byūtifuru Nēmu; 1979)
- "Where'll We Go from Now" (はるかな旅へ, Haruka na Tabi e; 1979)
- "The Galaxy Express 999" (銀河鉄道999, Ginga Tetsudō Surī Nain; 1979)
- "Holy and Bright" (ホーリー＆ブライト, Hōrī Ando Buraito; 1979)
- "Return to Africa" (リターン・トゥ・アフリカ, Ritān Tu Afurika; 1979)
- "Portopia" (ポートピア, Pōtopia; 1980)
- "Coming Together In Kathmandu" (（カミング・トゥゲザー・イン）カトマンズ, (Kamingu Tugezā In) Katomanzu; 1980)
- "After the Rain" (アフター・ザ・レイン, Afutā Za Rein; 1980)
- "Namaste" (ナマステ, Namasute; 1981)
- "Three Years of Love" (愛の3イヤーズ, Ai no Surī Iyāzu; 1981)
- "The Sunrise" (ザ・サンライズ, Za Sanraizu; 1982)
- "Let It Burn" (魔法のあかり, Mahō no Akari; 1982)
- "Carry Love" (キャリー・ラヴ, Kyarī Ravu; 1983)
- "Java wa Java in the book of Godiego" (1999)
- "Monkey Magic 2006" (2006)
- "One for Everyone" (2006)
- "Big Mama" (2007)
- "Walking On" (2011)

=== Albums ===
- Godiego (新創世紀, Shinsōseiki; 1976)
- Buddy Soundtrack (いろはの〝い〟, Iroha no "I"; 1976)
- House Soundtrack (ハウス, Hausu; 1977)
- Dead End (デッド・エンド, Deddo Endo; 1977)
- Ganbaron Soundtrack (小さなスーパーマン ガンバロン, Chiisana Sūpāman Ganbaron; 1977)
- CM Song Graffiti (CMソング・グラフィティ, Shī Emu Songu Gurafiti; 1978)
- Kaleidoscope (1978)
- The Glacier Fox Soundtrack (キタキツネ物語, Kita KItsune Monogatari; 1978)
- The Roads Men Travel Soundtrack (男たちの旅路, Otokotachi no Tabiji; 1978)
- Magic Monkey (西遊記, Saiyūki; 1978)
- Our Decade (OUR DECADE -70年代僕たちの時代-, OUR DECADE -Nanajūnendai Bokutachi no Jidai; 1979)
- Magic Capsule (1979)
- London Celebration (1980)
- Kathmandu (1980)
- The Distant Trail Soundtrack (遥かなる走路, Harukanaru Sōro; 1980)
- Godiego Hit Special (1980)
- Live in China (中国 后醍醐, Chūgoku Godaigo; 1980)
- M.O.R. (1981)
- CM Song Graffiti Vol. 2 (1982)
- Hit Collection (1982)
- Favourite Collection (1982)
- Carry Love Song Collection (1983)
- Flower (フラワー, Furawā; 1984)
- Original Hits Disc (1984)
- Suite: Peace/Godiego Live (平和組曲・ゴダイゴ・ライヴ, Heiwa Kumikyoku Godaigo Raivu; 1984)
- One Dimension Man (1984)
- Side-A Collection (1984)
- What a Beautiful Name (1999)
- Intermission/Godiego Final Live+2 (1985)
- Best Collection (1986)
- W Deluxe (1987)
- New Music Beat Choice 8 (1988)
- Twin Deluxe (1990)
- 15th Anniversary Godiego Box (1991)
- Best Album (1992)
- Godiego Great Best Vol. 1: Japanese Version (1994)
- Godiego Great Best Vol. 2: English Version (1994)
- Return of Godiego/Mickie Yoshino's Best Selection (1994)
- Godiego Single Collection (1994)
- Godiego Single Collection Vol. 2: B Side Collection (1995)
- Godiego... What A Beautiful Name (1999)
- Gold Godiego: Now And Then (1999)
- Godiego Box (2008)
- Golden Best (ゴールデン☆ベスト, Gōruden Besuto; 2009)
- The Glacier Fox: Alternate Soundtracks + Yukihide Takekawa Home Recording Demo in 1978 (2009)
