= Yukihide Takekawa =

Japanese singer, songwriter and composer (born 1952)

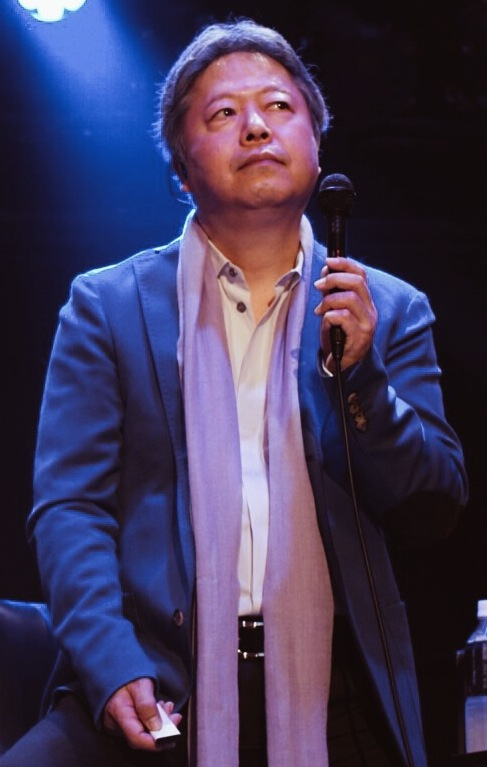
Takekawa in 2016

Yukihide Takekawa (タケカワ ユキヒデ（武川 行秀, Takekawa Yukihide; born October 22, 1952) is a Japanese singer, songwriter and composer from Urawa-ku, Saitama, Saitama Prefecture. He is best known for being the vocalist to the band Godiego as well as his solo career and his work as an author. Some of his compositions have been featured in video game, anime, films, and television drama soundtracks. These include the Galaxy Express 999 film, Saiyūki, Genesis Climber MOSPEADA, Soul Blazer, and Choushinsei Flashman.

One of his most popular songs was "Gandhara", which was translated into foreign languages many times and changed more than once during the translation.

The Japanese version of Return to Oz has "Keep On Dreamin'", performed by Godiego's Yukihide Takekawa, which was later re-recorded for one of his albums.

His daughter Ai is also a musician and has been featured on the soundtrack of InuYasha Kanketsu-Hen.
