= Montezuma, New Mexico =

- Unincorporated area
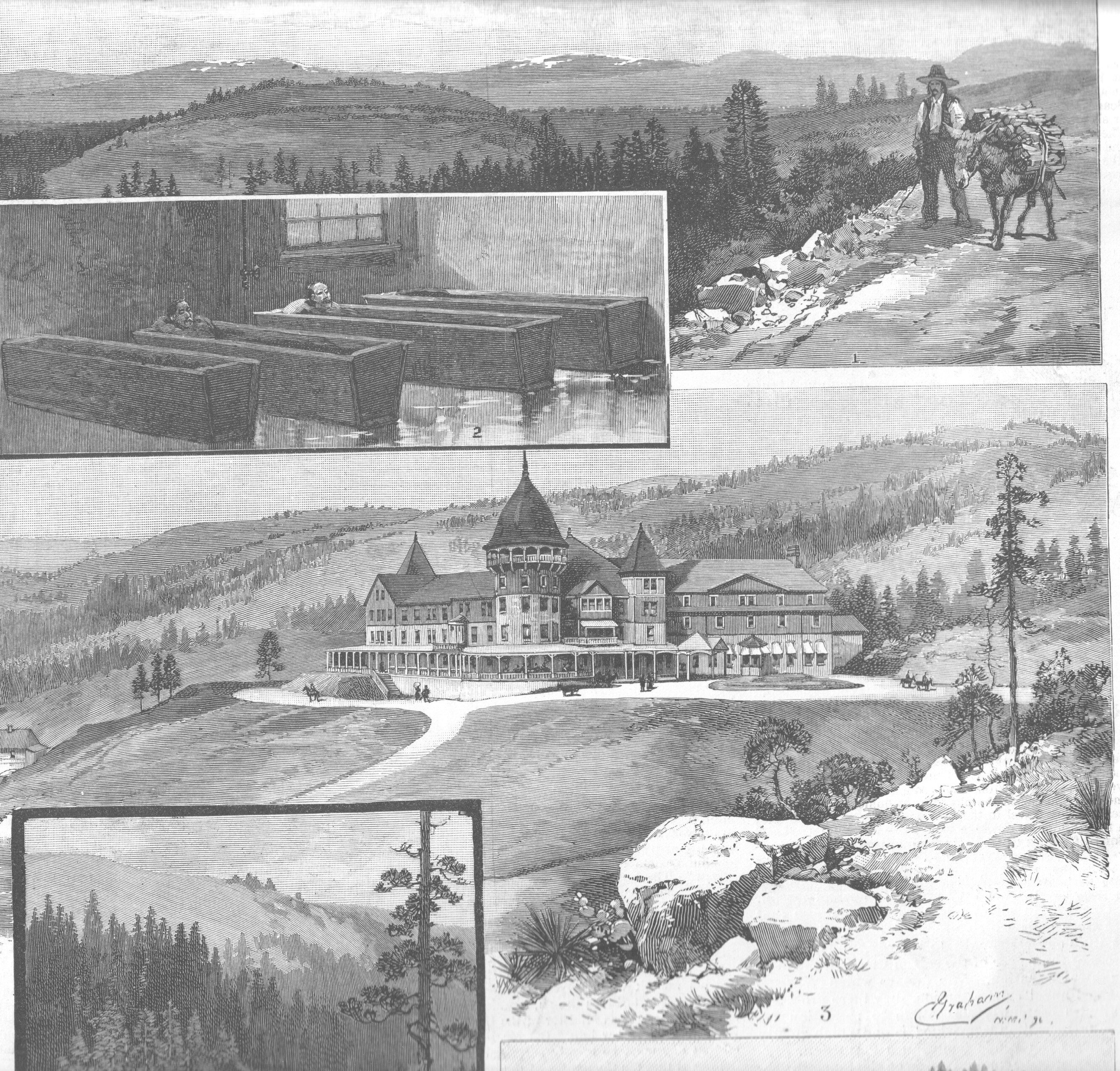
- Partial page from Harpers's Weekly, 1890, describing Las Vegas Hot Springs (now Montezuma, NM). Upper image is "Mountain View near the Springs". First inset is "Taking a Mud Bath". Third image is "The Montezuma", and the top of "View in the Cañon" appears to the lower left.

- Location within New Mexico
- Coordinates: 35°39′08″N 105°16′35″W
- Country: United States
- State: New Mexico
- County: San Miguel
- Elevation: 6,719 ft (2,048 m)
- Postal code: 87731
- GNIS feature ID: 908848

Montezuma is an unincorporated community in San Miguel County, New Mexico, United States. It is five miles northwest of the city of Las Vegas, New Mexico, at the mouth of Gallinas Canyon. During the 2020 census, Montezuma had a population of 503. Of those, 363 were under the age of 20.

The area has long been known for its natural hot springs, the Montezuma Hot Springs, and was called "Los Ojos Calientes" and "Las Vegas Hot Springs" until the late 19th century. It was also known for its ice ponds, which supplied ice used across the country before mechanical refrigeration became available.

Montezuma has been home to several hotels, including a palatial health resort known as the Montezuma Hotel, one of the few Harvey House hotels still in use, though no longer as a hotel, in New Mexico. Today, Montezuma consists of ranches and farms, a post office, water facilities, and the United World College-USA. The ZIP Code for Montezuma is 87731.

== History ==
=== Pre-Contact Indigenous Era ===
Native people valued the hot springs and used them therapeutically. The hot springs were centrally located within the territory of the Pueblo peoples, who lived in the area from time immemorial. Pecos Pueblo, one of the largest and most fortified Pueblos, and an important trading center, was just 30 miles to the west.

Apache people arrived in the area by the mid-1400s. The area that is now Montezuma is within the homeland of the Jicarilla Apache, specifically the Llanero Moiety, traditionally Plains bison hunters. The Jicarilla Apache lived a semi-nomadic lifestyle, sharing the area that was home to Pueblo people. Jicarilla Apache were strong trading partners with Pueblo people in Pecos, Taos and Picuris Pueblos, and would visit the pueblos to trade. Tipi rings, perhaps left by Jicarilla Apache, have been found in the Trout Springs area, just up the Gallinas Canyon from Montezuma.

It is said that the springs were a sacred spot for Native people, and that people from different tribes met there peacefully, held ceremonies, and enjoyed the healing waters of the hot springs.

=== Spanish Era ===
In 1541 Spanish conquistador Francisco Vasquez de Coronado's expedition passed through the area searching for gold, on its way to Cicuye Pueblo, later called Pecos, 30 miles to the west. By 1610, Spain had claimed the region and established a capital in Santa Fe.

Due to Spanish demands on Native land and labor, the introduction of slavery, the suppression of Pueblo religion, as well as famine, pestilence and disease, Pueblo resistance to the Spanish occupation grew. Apache people assisted by welcoming and protecting Puebloan fugitives, and assisting Puebloan rebels. Specifically, area Apache and Pecos people united against the brutal occupation by Juan de Onate from 1598 to 1606.

The Jicarilla Apache and Pecos Pueblo people continued as strong trading partners and allies through the mid-1600s, and joined in resistance when the Spanish raided the Apache people to enslave them. Apache people often wintered at Pecos Pueblo, and joined with the Pecos people in hunting in the area.

Following years of abuse, Pueblo, Apache and other Native people united and drove the Spanish colonizers from the region during the Pueblo Revolt in 1680. One of the leaders of the revolt, Felipe de Ye, was from nearby Pecos Pueblo. When the Spanish returned in 1692, the people of Pecos Pueblo fled to the mountains and were sheltered by their Apache allies, leaving Pecos Pueblo abandoned for a time.

During the early 1700s, the Jicarilla Apache followed a bi-seasonal mobility pattern, living on the plains during the warmer months and returning to the eastern foothills of the Sangre de Cristo mountains during the winter. By 1718 they were experiencing attacks from Comanche who had been pushed into the region, and in 1723 some of the Jicarilla agreed to be baptized and live as Spanish subjects at a mission. Unwilling to build a mission for the Jicarilla, Spain sent them to a mission located in present-day Ranchos de Taos.

Comanche attacks also took their toll on Pecos Pueblo and by the 1760s the population of Pecos Pueblo was just over 500 people. Some Jicarilla Apache continued to move between the plains and the eastern foothills of the Sangre de Cristo mountains.

=== Mexican Era ===
Claimed by Spain since the 16th Century, New Mexico became part of Mexico in 1821. That same year, the Santa Fe Trail opened, crossing the Gallinas River five miles south of present-day Montezuma.

In 1823, wealthy sheepherder Don Luis Maria Cabeza de Baca was granted 500,000 acres of land for himself and his 17 sons including the present-day Montezuma Hot Springs. He built two large adobe homes four miles south of the hot springs, along the Gallinas River, and grazed large herds of livestock. Within a few years, raids by Comanches caused most of the Cabeza de Baca family to abandon the land.

In 1835, a group of Mexican colonists from San Miguel del Vado petitioned for a land grant of approximately the same area as the Cabeza de Baca grant, and established Las Vegas, New Mexico, five miles south of the hot springs. They engaged in summer farming for two years, and spent their first winter in Las Vegas in 1837. The next year, the last 17 surviving Pecos Pueblo people left their home, moving west to join the Jemez people.

In the following years, a few Mexican families farmed corn and oats in the Montezuma area.

The Las Vegas colonists were well-positioned to engage in trade with Santa Fe Trail travelers, and in 1840, they established a second community, Plaza de Arriba known as upper town or San Antonio, three miles to the north, closer to the hot springs. Brothers Julian and Antonio Donaldson petitioned the local alcalde, or government official in Las Vegas, for the site of the Montezuma Hot Springs, and received a grant of the property in 1841. They built a bathhouse there. The same year, the Jicarilla Apache officially lost most of their homeland, as the Mexican government granted 1.7 million acres to Charles Beaubien and Guadalupe Miranda. The Jicarilla continued to live in the mountains and fight for their homeland, existing as a nomadic enclave within a settled zone.

=== Early U.S. era ===
In 1846, the U.S. Army entered and claimed New Mexico as a territory of the United States, starting the Mexican-American War which culminated in the area becoming officially part of the United States in 1848 through the Treaty of Guadalupe Hidalgo. From that time, the Donaldson brothers' small bathhouse at the Montezuma hot springs, accessible for a fee, was five miles from a national road connecting the established United States to its new southwest territories, booming with commercial freight, stagecoach travel and military freight to supply southwestern forts, and traffic on the trail increased exponentially. The army, seeking the springs' waters, built a hospital across the Gallinas River from the Montezuma hot springs in 1846. The hospital was a long one-story adobe building with a veranda across the front supported by natural log posts. The Donaldson brothers, still operating the hot springs, built a six-room log bathhouse there.

The U.S. government sought to remove nomadic native people from settled areas. It increased military presence along the Santa Fe Trail, and established Fort Union 33 miles northeast of the Montezuma Hot Springs in 1851. Its purpose was to protect travelers on the Santa Fe Trail from Native people.

In 1856 the U.S. Marshal seized the Montezuma Hot Springs property from the Donaldson brothers for debts, and sold it. Soon, the U.S. Army assumed management of the Montezuma Hot Springs, in conjunction with Fort Union. The hot springs were believed to cure syphilis and other ailments that plagued the soldiers. During the Civil War, soldiers at Fort Union fought the Confederacy at the Battle of Glorieta, and then continued the U.S. campaign against Native people in the area, relocating them onto reservations.

After the Civil War, the Montezuma Hot Springs property changed hands several times. The adobe military hospital was converted into a hotel in 1862. In 1864 the owner, O.H. Woodworth, advertised the wonderful effect of these springs in curing "Syphilitic and kindred diseases, Scrofula, Cutaneous diseases, Rheumatism, etc." The bathhouse was managed by Dr. and Mrs. S.B. Davis, and then W.S. Moore bought the hot springs and ran an establishment called The Adobe Hotel, where Jesse James and Billy the Kid spent three days as guests in July 1879.

That same month, the Atchison, Topeka and Santa Fe railroad arrived in nearby Las Vegas, New Mexico. With the arrival of the railroad, the focus of the soldiers at Fort Union was no longer on protecting the Santa Fe Trail and was solely on removing Native people from the area and forcing them onto reservations. The Jicarilla Apache were the last tribe removed from the area, in 1888. A small group of Jicarilla Apache continued to live at El Cielo Mountain, up the canyon from Montezuma, near El Porvenir. When they once came down into Gallinas Canyon, a mounted troop from Fort Union captured them and killed many. The survivors were taken to the reservation.

=== Railroad era ===
The arrival of the railroad in New Mexico Territory in 1879 began a new era. The Las Vegas Hot Springs Company, controlled by the railroad, purchased the Montezuma hot springs property on August 1, 1879, and built a two-story stone bathhouse there for $17,000. In February 1880, the company opened a three-story stone hotel with 75 rooms available for $4 per night. The sandstone structure, built by local contractor F.C. Martsolf, had a projecting central tower and second floor balustraded veranda, reading rooms, parlors and a large dining hall. It was originally called the Hot Springs Hotel. Rooms in this hotel rented for $2 or $3 per day.

In 1881 a fire destroyed the bathhouse. The company built a new one for $20,000 which could accommodate 500 customers daily. Also in 1881 a telephone line connected the hotel to Las Vegas, New Mexico, then a boomtown.

In 1882 Agua Pura, a company associated with the Atchison, Topeka and Santa Fe Railway, built a dam on the Gallinas River, just above the Montezuma Hot Springs, to create a small reservoir allowing water to be piped into homes and to fire hydrants in Las Vegas. The reservoir was beneath a high cliff that shaded it, and it remained frozen for several months each the year. Agua Pura began using the reservoir as a source for ice. The railroad ran a nine-mile spur line from Las Vegas, along the area that is now Cinder Road, past the hot springs two miles to the reservoir. The ice was used for refrigerated freight cars transporting vegetables from California to eastern markets. Montezuma became one of the major ice-producing centers in the west, and up to 300 men were employed seasonally by Agua Pura Ice Company for the cutting, storing and shipping of 50,000 tons of ice annually, until mechanical refrigeration became available in the 1930s.

Another company, seeing Agua Pura's success, constructed eight more dams in the area for the cutting of ice. The original reservoir, shaded by the cliff, became known as the Montezuma Skating Pond, a favorite spot for ice skating. A 1901 railroad publication stated that guests could skate in midwinter on the ponds of the Gallinas in the perpetual shade of the canyon walls while at the same time ladies sat on the open veranda of the hotel sewing with their bare hands. The pond continued to be used for ice skating through the 1990s. There was also a lime kiln in the area.

The U.S. government opened land in the area to homesteading, and many homesteaders passed through Montezuma on their way to stake claims in Gallinas Canyon starting in the 1880s.

The railroad spur brought tourists to Montezuma, and in 1881 and 1882, the Atchison, Topeka and Santa Fe Railway built the first of three large hotels on the site. At the time, railroads were opening luxury vacation destination resorts in naturally appealing settings along their lines, creating a symbiotic relationship between rail and hotel. The railway renamed the city, formerly known as Hot Springs, Montezuma due to a reported Pecos legend that the famed emperor of the Mexica had journeyed to the springs to bathe in their healing waters. The legend may have been fabricated by General Kearney's soldiers while they enjoyed the hot springs.

==== First Montezuma Hotel ====
This first Montezuma Hotel opened its doors on April 17, 1882. It was designed in the Queen Anne style, a blend of Gothic and Elizabethan elements characteristic of American resorts near mineral springs and seashores, by Kansas firm Jerome, Rice, Moore & Emory, and cost $150,000 to build. It faced the landscaped grounds and central fountain, known as Fountain Park, and its back was to the river, across from the bathhouse. It had gaslights, and a dining hall, bowling alleys, a billiards room, and 240 guest rooms. An annunciator allowed guests to ring from their rooms for room service or other assistance. The hotel was an enormous, E-shaped castle-like structure built entirely of wood, four stories high, with a massive tower. It was the largest frame building in the country at the time. Together with its bathhouses, swimming pool, private mud baths, outdoor hot springs, fine dining, and various outdoor activities, it was among the finest health resorts in the world. A visitor in 1882 described a "Russian bath" that involved being sprayed by hot water jets, then being sprayed alternately with hot and cold water, and finally lying on a marble slab to be soaped, scrubbed, shampooed and paddled by an attendant.

Distinguished guests from around the world visited Montezuma to enjoy curative waters and other amenities including a racetrack. The hotel and dining service were managed by Fred Harvey, and the hotel was one of the grandest in the Harvey House system. The availability of ice made it possible for the railroad to bring refrigerated goods, and the hotel's restaurant served luxuries including sea turtles and sea celery from the Gulf of California and fresh fruit and vegetables imported from Guaymas, Mexico. A small pool in the Gallinas River served as a holding tank for the sea turtles. Carriages and horses were available for guests, and the park contained rustic bridges, an archery range, and tennis and croquet courts. A small bridge connected the Montezuma Hotel to the train depot and power plant across the river. Ladies gathered in the sewing rooms or sat on the veranda while gentlemen spent time in the basement billiard rooms. In January 1884, a fire started in the naphtha of the gas generating plant and destroyed the first Montezuma Hotel within an hour.

==== Second Montezuma Hotel ====
The company immediately began building a new hotel. Chicago architects Daniel Burnham and John Wellborn Root chose a location on a hill well above the bathhouses and landscaped area, commanding ample sunlight and a view of the valley below. Built of brownstone with a slate roof, the second Montezuma Hotel opened in 1885. It had three towers, each with a different profile and height. The largest tower had an ogee cap, and an observation deck supported by curving brackets. It was the first building in New Mexico to be lighted by electricity. The floor plan allowed for several hours of natural light in each of the hotel's 300 rooms daily, and the structure was one of the few buildings in the United States supplied with pressurized water. The building was declared fireproof, with an alarm system reaching every room, insulated wiring, and fireproof plaster. Nonetheless, within four months of its opening, a fire started in the attic. Volunteer fire fighters were able to save the first two floors, but water sprayed from their hoses could not reach the third and fourth floors.

==== Third Montezuma Hotel ====
The company rebuilt the hotel, stating that the third Montezuma Hotel would be "the most palatial inn between Chicago and San Francisco," and it re-opened in August, 1886. It was named The Phoenix for rising from the ashes. The name didn't stick, and it continued to be called the Montezuma Hotel. Guests entering the lobby on the east side of the building found themselves before a huge maroon terra-cotta fireplace in a cathedral design. The lobby featured an ash-paneled ceiling and walls, large and elaborate furnishing, and flowerlike chandeliers.

The hotel had more than 250 rooms and a 60 by 100-foot casino with a dance floor and stage as well as four bowling alleys and a large billiard hall. The dining room seated 500 guests at a time, was nearly 100 feet long and 60 feet wide, and was finished in ash and adorned with stained glass and a mammoth buffet, 16 feet high. Next to the main dining room was a smaller one for the children. The hotel was furnished with cocobolo, ebony and French walnut, and fireplaces were in every room. Drinking the alkaline saline waters served was said to cure rheumatism, gout, and dyspepsia, and do wonders for the skin.

The bath house was capable of providing 1,000 baths per day. Bathing in the waters was said to alleviate rheumatism and blood poisoning, and improve the skin. Baths and massages cost 50 cents or a dollar. A special offering was the mud bath which involved soaking in a mortar-like mixture of hot water and black mud from the shore of the Gallinas River before being washed and dried.

A stable, power plant, icehouse, depot, and foreman's cottage were on the premises. The grounds and terraces were planted with bluegrass sod brought from Kansas. They featured archery, lawn tennis, croquet, a beautiful garden with a fountain, a zoo and a racetrack. A gambling establishment called the Crumbly Gambling House, not affiliated with the hotel, was located near the bridge and frequented by hotel guests.

Distinguished guests at the hotel included former president Ulysses S. Grant. Guests came from England, Germany and Mexico. In 1887, 600 guests attended the Grand Army of the Republic convention at the Montezuma Hotel. The next year, the Montezuma Hotel hosted the national convention of the Odd Fellows Lodge, and 1,000 guests arrived on two trains. Townspeople of Las Vegas were invited to weekly dances at the hotel.

Despite all this, the hotel was never profitable, and ran a deficit annually. Business at the hotel suffered during the Panic of 1893. Also in 1893 a railroad strike halted transportation. The Montezuma Hotel closed its doors in August, 1893. From 1895 to 1903, the hotel opened only during the summer and for special occasions.

By the late 1890s, travelers from the east preferred to continue west to the Grand Canyon and California without stopovers in New Mexico. Other resorts had opened in the West, including El Tovar at the Grand Canyon. In addition, travel abroad on luxurious steamships became available.

The railway company attempted to maintain business by publishing books about the community in 1898 and 1900. The 1898 book called Montezuma "the most desirable resort in the world for those who are afflicted with any form of lung or throat disease" and said that Northern New Mexico would be palliative for all sick people except for those with "advanced stage" heart disease, who would suffer from the altitude. "Even imaginary ailments give way before forces so potent for good," the railroad publication said.

The 1900 text said: "The Montezuma Hotel is a handsome four-story structure in the chateau style, built of grayish red sandstone and slate. It stands on the north side of the Gallinas where the cañon widens to a small amphitheater, about one hundred feet above the riverbed, and commanding attractive views of the pine-clad slopes of the surrounding hills, and a splendid vista through the cañon mouth across the plains and mesas to the dark forest ridge, thirty miles away on the southwestern horizon. The floor of the amphitheater is occupied by a pretty lawn of several acres, with firm turf, primeval pines, seats, flower-beds, and tennis and croquet grounds, while the steep slope up to the hotel is tastily parked with winding drives and walks." Rates at the time were $2.50 to $4.00 by the day, and $52 – $80 by the month, with discounts available under various circumstances. The book particularly recommended the hotel for those suffering from tuberculosis.

A book published by the railroad in 1901 extolled Montezuma's sunshine, dry climate, altitude and temperature, stating that the abundant sunshine encouraged one to spend time outdoors in the "aseptic air." The book said that Montezuma had a post office called the "Hot Springs Post Office" and was served by five trains daily in each direction on the Hot Springs branch of the Santa Fe Railway that connected Montezuma to Las Vegas, making it easy for guests at the Montezuma to access department stores, curio shops, dressmakers and dentists in Las Vegas. Montezuma also had a telegraph and telephone station, a railroad ticket office, and a public school managed by the hotel, for the children of guests. Hotel sewage was "conducted several miles down the valley, and converted by the Berlin system to the uses of the hotel farm garden."

The 1901 book described the grounds below the Montezuma Hotel as "a pretty lawn of several acres, with firm turf, primeval pines, seats, flowerbeds, tennis and croquet grounds, while the steep slope up to the hotel is tastily parked with winding drives and walks." The book described the bathhouse, just beside the "garrulous Gallinas," with its 15 by 54-foot natatorium, or pool, sloping from four to nine feet in depth, filled with water from a hot spring cooled to a suitable temperature, and with rings and a trapeze over the water.

In 1903, the Las Vegas and Hot Springs Electric Railway, Light and Power Company launched electric trolley service extending from Las Vegas, New Mexico to Montezuma, in part using the tracks of the railroad spur and adding overhead electric power lines. Ten miles of electric railway extended between the Montezuma Hot Springs and the Castaneda Hotel in East Las Vegas, New Mexico. Passengers traveled on the line to attend special events such as the Brotherhood of Locomotive Firemen's Ball in 1903 in Montezuma. Nonetheless, as business at the Montezuma Hotel was very slow by then, the trolley lines were mainly used for transporting ice on freight cars drawn by an electric locomotive, until the service ended in 1906.

In 1903, citizens of Las Vegas petitioned for a bill to build a "Scenic Road," a wagon road joining the courthouse of Santa Fe with the courthouse of Las Vegas via the canyon of the Santa Fe River and over the mountain range. The proposal, which called for using convict labor to complete this task, passed. In June 1903, F.H. Pierce, President of the board of the State Penitentiary in Santa Fe and also superintendent of the Agua Pura Company of Las Vegas, assigned 20 convicts to work on the road using black powder blasting. By July, a new "smooth road" was emerging along the canyon wall, high above the old river road along the Gallinas River. Work continued until 1907, when funds were exhausted. The road had been completed to within 3/4 of a mile of the eastern boundary of the Pecos National Forest. Campgrounds and bridges were added in the 1930s, by Civilian Conservation Corps workers.

The railroad closed the Montezuma Hotel in 1903, deeming it unprofitable. The Montezuma Hotel became known as the "neglected mansion in the mountains." The era of the great American resort hotels had ended. In 1904, a flash flood swept away the bath house.

In 1912, the year that New Mexico became a state, boxer Jim Flynn used the Montezuma Hotel as training quarters in preparation for his fight against heavyweight champion Jack Johnson in Las Vegas, New Mexico. The Atchison, Topeka, and Santa Fe Railroad company then sold the property to the Y.M.C.A. for $1 in 1913.

Around the same time, the Agua Pura Company built Peterson Dam, capable of storing 60 million gallons of water, above Montezuma. From Peterson Reservoir, water was diverted into a ditch above the ice ponds, and then into a wooden flume on the face of the cliff towering over the ice ponds. To build the flume, workmen crawled along the face of the cliff on ten-inch planks supported by spikes driven into holes drilled into the granite wall.

=== Baptist College ===
The Y.M.C.A. eventually sold the property and it changed hands several times. In 1920, negotiated by the Las Vegas Commercial Club, the Baptist Convention of New Mexico purchased it for use as a college. The Montezuma Baptist College opened in 1922 with 106 students, and by 1925 the school had 255 students and 29 faculty members. Initially, male students stayed in the Old Stone Hotel, and female students stayed in the Montezuma Hotel, but in time the condition of the Old Stone Hotel was so poor that all students moved into the Montezuma, with men on the first floor and women on the second and third floors. Rooms above the dining room served as the library and classrooms. Students used the bathhouses and had access to a gymnasium on the grounds. In 1930 the Baptist College closed due to depression-era financial difficulties.

=== Montezuma Seminary ===
In May 1937, the National Catholic Welfare Conference (NCWC) purchased the 800-acre property in Montezuma, to be managed by the Mexican Catholic Hierarchy, for $19,000. At that time, the Catholic Church in Mexico was impacted by the Cristero War, which developed out of the Mexican Revolution. Mexican President Plutarco Elias Calles had sought to limit the power of the church, and so the Montezuma Seminary was established in 1937 as a seminary in exile. Its official name was the Pontifical National Seminary of Our Lady of Guadalupe, and it was a joint project between U.S. and Mexican Catholic hierarchies. NCWC spent more than $350,000 to restore the premises in 1937.

From 1937 until 1972 the Montezuma Seminary became known as the "American Douai" and served as a training site for well over 1,000 Mexican priests. The main Montezuma Hotel housed the theologians, the Stone Hotel housed the philosophers, and the Latin scholars lived in a white frame building at the foot of the hill. The seminary obtained heat from the old power plant across the river, using coal hauled from Raton, New Mexico. Steam was conducted through insulated pipes to all of the buildings. and water from the reservoir built in 1883 in the hills above the Montezuma Hotel. The Montezuma Seminary closed in 1972, as the reason for exile had ended.

=== United World College-USA ===
For a time, members of the Brown Berets, a Chicano power student group from New Mexico Highlands University in Las Vegas, New Mexico, occupied the abandoned Montezuma Castle. In 1974, the Montezuma Hotel Complex was listed on the National Register of Historic Places. The property remained vacant for a decade until Armand Hammer purchased the property in 1981 for $1 Million, for the location of the Armand Hammer United World College of the American West (UWC-USA).

In 1981, the Montezuma Hotel, by then called the Montezuma Castle, was not in a condition for occupancy, and the Armand Hammer United World College of the American West made its home in the buildings surrounding the Montezuma Castle, leaving the castle as a backdrop rather than the centerpiece of the school. The college limited its immediate effort to making the Montezuma Castle weathertight, replacing broken windows, repairing the roof, and sprucing up the lobby for the dedication ceremonies in October 1982. Armand Hammer renewed his commitment to restoring the Montezuma in 1990, but died later that year.

In 1997, the National Trust for Historic Preservation selected the Montezuma Castle as one of America's 11 Most Endangered Historic Places. In 1998, the White House Millennium Council designated the Montezuma Castle as one of America's Treasures, the first property west of the Mississippi River to receive this honor. Also in 1998, philanthropist Shelby M.C. Davis announced a major challenge grant to attract funds to save the Montezuma Castle.

The renovated Montezuma Castle was publicly unveiled on September 29, 2001, presided over by Queen Noor. Prince Pavlos of Greece, an alum of UWC-USA, was present. Shelby Davis, the globally-minded philanthropist who endowed much of the project, accepted an outpouring of gratitude from UWC-USA students representing 83 nations and dressed in traditional costumes.

== Education ==
The United World College-USA, a two-year International Baccalaureate high school with students from more than 90 countries, is located in Montezuma.

During the 1950's, 1960's and 1970's the village of Montezuma NM housed a K-8 elementary school. All the students, regardless of grade, were seated in the same room in the same building. One teacher for decades was Mrs. Beatrice Barbero Montoya, one of the first female educators of the era.

== Geography and geology ==
The community lies along the Gallinas River, in the Sangre de Cristo Mountains. It is only a few miles from Hermit's Peak. The water filling the Montezuma Hot Springs likely originates from snowmelt and rain from the Sangre de Cristo Mountains which infiltrates porous and permeable rocks, percolating through rock to the mouth of the Gallinas Canyon. There are several theories as to how the water is heated, including geothermal gradient, heat associated with relatively recently uplifted basement rock, or magma extending from volcanism of northeastern New Mexico.

The Gallinas River serves as the water source for Las Vegas, New Mexico.

== Transportation and infrastructure ==
Montezuma is connected to Las Vegas, New Mexico by New Mexico State Road 65 and by San Miguel County Road A11A. State Road 65 crosses two bridges in Montezuma, the NM-65 over Hill Side bridge, and the NM-65 over Gallinas River bridge. Both bridges were built in 1988. In 2021 it was estimated that 75 vehicles per day passed over these bridges, with 15% truck traffic.

The City of Las Vegas Water Treatment Plant is located near Montezuma, and there are two reservoirs above Montezuma, Bradner Reservoir and Peterson Reservoir.

== Fire and water issues ==
Residents of Montezuma evacuated during the Calf Canyon/Hermits Peak Fire in 2022. Firefighters were able to save the community from the fire, but the Gallinas River, which serves as the water source for Las Vegas and some of Montezuma, suffers from ash and turbidity due to the burn scar in its watershed. In addition, the area has experienced flooding and bark beetles following the fire.

== Historic structures still in existence ==
- Old Stone Hotel: Built in 1879-1880, the Old Stone Hotel is the oldest building on the UWC-USA campus. The Old Stone Hotel and the annex behind it built circa 1880 are in use by the school.
- Montezuma Castle: This structure was built in 1885 and then rebuilt in 1886 after being partially damaged by fire. Previously known as The Phoenix and The Montezuma Hotel, it is now called "The Castle" and is in use by UWC-USA.
- Sasakawa: This Victorian-style house was built circa 1885 and is currently in use by UWC-USA.
- Old Boiler House: The old power plant, located on the south side of New Mexico Highway 65, across from the UWC-USA campus, was built in the mid-1880s and supplied power to the Montezuma Hotel. It is not currently in use.
- Lime Kiln: Canyon Lime Company operated a lime quarry and crushing plant for supplying pulverized limestone to the Santa Fe Railroad and to beet sugar factories in Colorado and Wyoming. The ruins of the lime kiln are on the south side of New Mexico Highway 65, across from the UWC-USA campus.
- Railroad Bridge: The railroad bridge in Montezuma was built in the early 1900s with convict labor and black powder blasting. It crosses the Gallinas River and can be seen on the south side of Old Highway 65 just before it arrives at the UWC-USA campus.
- Hot Springs: The natural hot springs have drawn people to Montezuma for as long as history has recorded.
- Bathhouse: The Montezuma bathhouse was washed away in a flood in 1904. The stone structure that currently exists must have been built sometime later, and is not currently in use.
- Montezuma Skating Pond: This was the pond used by the Agua Pura Company as a source of ice for preserving perishable goods for the railroad. After mechanical refrigeration became available in the 1930s, the ice was no longer needed and the pond's primary use became for ice skating. The pond is on the south side of Skating Pond Road, just after it separates from New Mexico Highway 65.

== Films and television and books ==
Movies and television shows filmed in and around Montezuma include:

- The Evil, 1978, was filmed in the Montezuma Castle.
- Fanboys, 2009.
- Georgia O'Keeffe, 2009. Parts were filmed on the veranda of the Montezuma Castle and in the nearby mountains.

The book The Night Journal by Elizabeth Crook takes place in the Montezuma Castle and in nearby Pecos.

== Notable people ==
- Giovanni Maria de Agostini, a lay monk, passed through Montezuma frequently in the mid-1860s while living on a mountain which was later named for the monk, Hermit's Peak.
- Miguel A. Otero, Jr., future territorial governor of New Mexico, was present at the inaugural ball of the Montezuma Hotel on April 17, 1882.
- Teddy Roosevelt visited Montezuma while he was governor of New York.
- Ulysses S. Grant visited the Montezuma while he was a U.S. Army General.
- Civil War U.S. Army Gen. William Tecumseh Sherman stayed at the Montezuma Hotel.
- Explorer John Fremont stayed at the Montezuma Hotel.
- The Marquise of Lorne stayed at the Montezuma Hotel.
- Princess Louise, daughter of Queen Victoria, stayed at the Montezuma Hotel.
- The 8th Duke of Rutland from Great Britain and his wife, seeking a western experience, camped on the grounds of the Montezuma Hotel, and their daughter was born at the Montezuma Hotel in 1882.
- U.S. President Rutherford B. Hayes stayed at the Montezuma Hotel.
- Boxer Jim Flynn used the Montezuma Hotel as his training camp while preparing for his 1912 championship bout with Jack Johnson in Las Vegas. This fight became the subject of the movie The Great White Hope.
- Industrialist Armand Hammer purchased the Montezuma Castle and surrounding grounds to establish the Armand Hammer United World College of the American West, in 1982, and visited several times before his death in 1990.
- Prince Charles, then president of the United World Colleges, visited the Montezuma campus for its dedication ceremony in October, 1982. The Prince's plane landed in Las Vegas during 30-mph winds while the two high school bands played La Bamba. After meeting Armand Hammer, the mayor of Las Vegas and the city chamber president, Prince Charles headed to Montezuma where he stayed in the home of Dr. Theodore Lockwood, president of the Armand Hammer United World College of the American West, before dedicating the Montezuma Hotel, the Old Stone Hotel, and other buildings on the 110-acre campus before a crowd of 850 people.
- The Beach Boys performed an outdoor concert at the first graduation held at the Armand Hammer United World College of the American West, in 1984.
- Her Majesty Queen Noor of Jordan, then president of the United World Colleges, visited Montezuma several times including in 2001 for the public unveiling of the Montezuma Castle's renovation.
- Malcolm Forbes of Forbes Magazine visited the UWC-USA campus.
- Columnist Anne Landers visited the campus.
- Composer Philip Glass visited the campus.
- Singer and songwriter Judy Collins visited the campus.
- French-Canadian astronaut Julie Payette visited the campus.
- Nokia President and CEO Jorma Ollila visited the campus.
- Abiodun Williams, advisor to the United Nations Secretary General, visited the campus.
- Crown Prince Pavlos of Greece is an alum of UWC-USA, and attended the unveiling of the Montezuma Castle on September 29, 2001.
- Philanthropist Shelby M. C. Davis, who endowed much of the renovation of the Montezuma Castle, attended the unveiling on September 29, 2001.
- New Mexico Governor Gary Johnson spoke at the unveiling of the renovated Montezuma Castle on September 29, 2001.
- Former United Nations Ambassador Bill Richardson spoke at the unveiling of the renovated Montezuma Castle on September 29, 2001.

== See also ==
Las Vegas, New Mexico
