= Montezuma Hot Springs =

Thermal springs

Montezuma Hot Springs Las Vegas Hot Springs
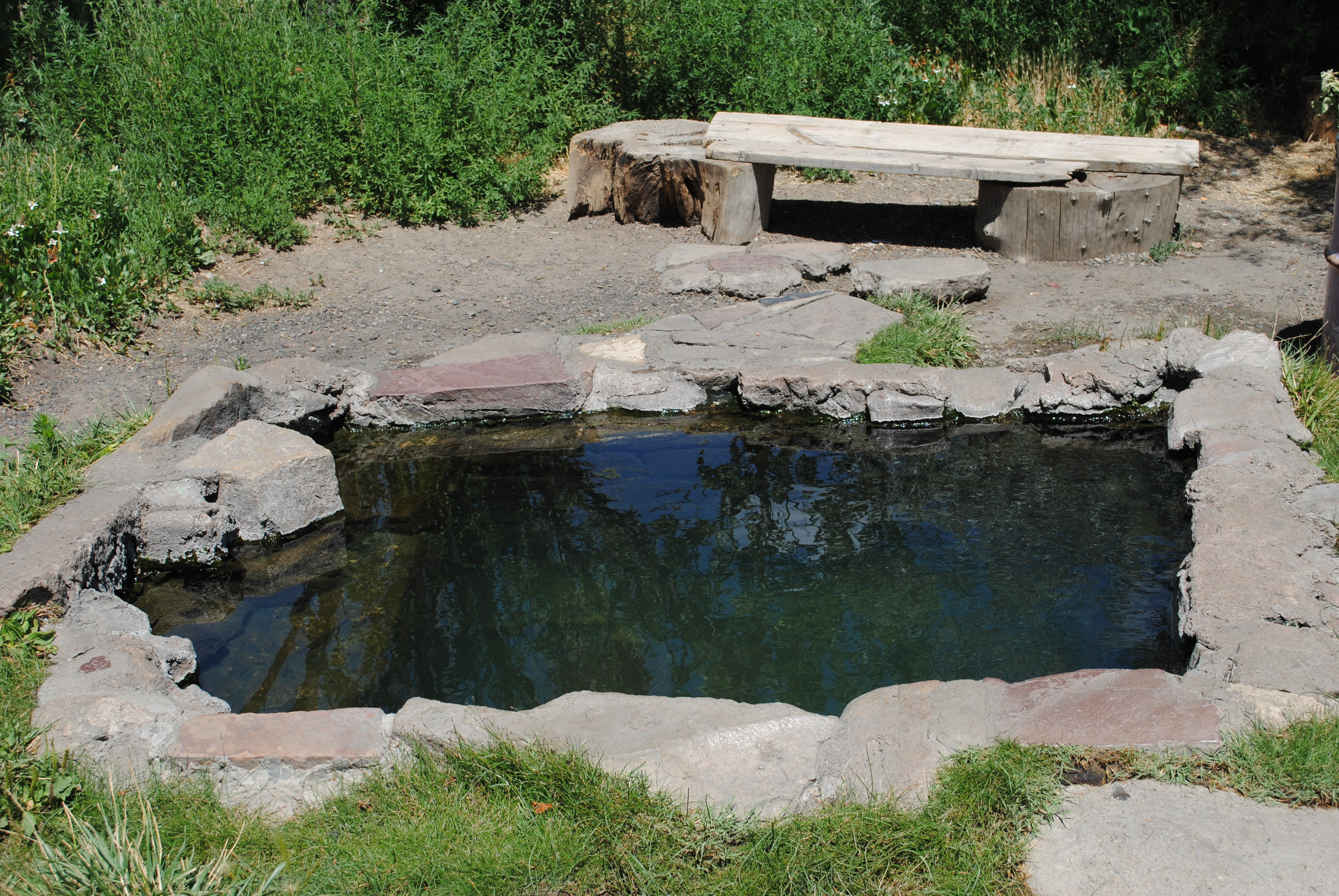
- Montezuma hot springs "The Cube"
- Interactive map of Montezuma Hot Springs; Las Vegas Hot Springs
- Location: Montezuma, New Mexico
- Coordinates: 35°39′16″N 105°17′04″W
- Elevation: 6,772 ft (2,064 m)
- Type: geothermal
- Temperature: 138 °F (59 °C)

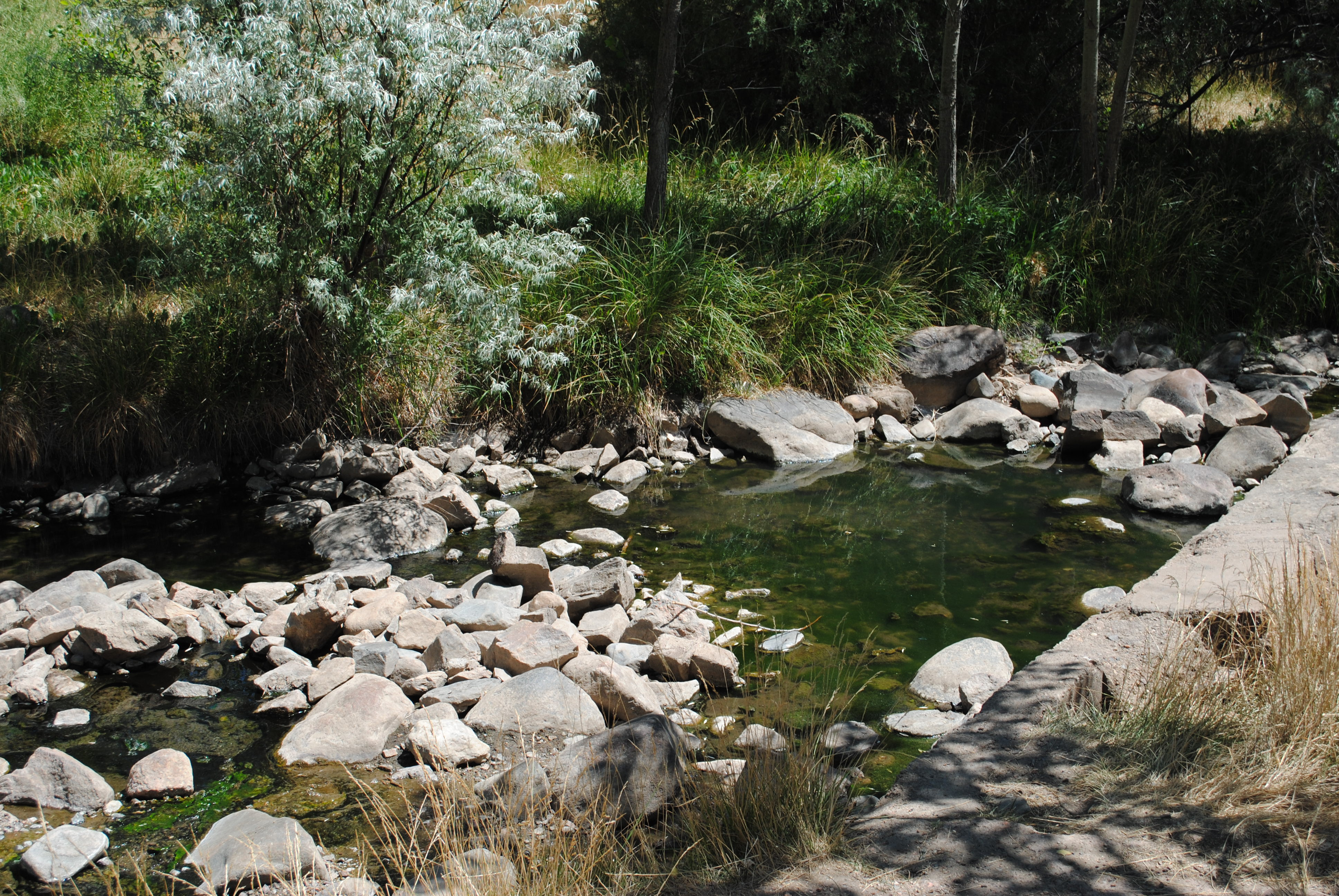
Montezuma Hot Springs at the Rio Gallinas

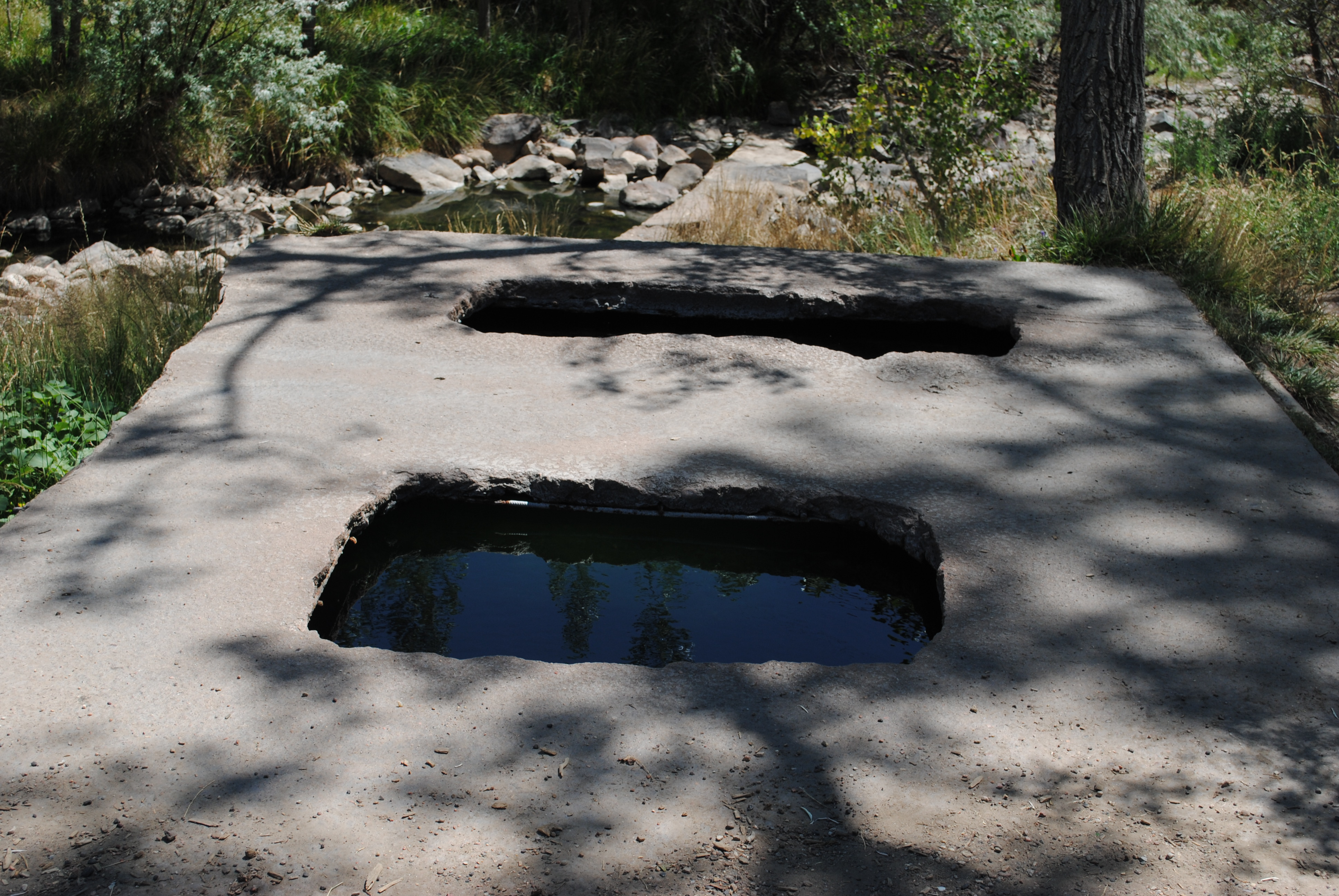
Montezuma Hot Springs - "The Toaster" pools at the ruins of the old bathhouse

Montezuma Hot Springs, also known as Las Vegas Hot Springs, are a grouping of 20-to-30 thermal springs in the Montezuma unincorporated community of San Miguel County, near the town of Las Vegas, New Mexico.

== History ==
The springs were used for centuries by local indigenous people for their healing properties. According to legend, the hot springs were named "Montezuma" in 1846 when a group of General Stephen Watts Kearney's soldiers encountered Pecos Pueblo people who told them that the Mexican emperor Montezuma (though it is unclear which one), was raised at the hot springs. When ready to ascend to the throne, a group of eagles lifted him into the air and flew him back to Mexico.

In the early 19th century Spanish ranchers used the area but did not develop the springs. After New Mexico was annexed in 1846, the U.S. Army built a one-story adobe-constructed hospital at the site of the hot springs, that was later converted into a hotel in 1862, called The Adobe.

In 1879, a group of "eastern promoters" raised funds to build a second hotel, the Hot Springs Hotel on the land adjacent to The Adobe Hotel. The new hotel contained two bathhouses – one for hot mineral water soaking and one for mud baths. In 1880, the Santa Fe Railroad created the Las Vegas Hot Springs Company; the company purchased the Hot Springs Hotel, the surrounding property and the bathhouses. In April 1882, the company completed a standard-gauge track between Las Vegas and the hot springs, and the first train made the journey on April 5. The company continued to develop the property and later that year opened the three-story Queen Anne styled Montezuma Hotel featuring 270 steam-heated rooms. In January, 1884, the hotel and bathhouses burned to the ground; within weeks the Santa Fe Railroad and the Chicago-based architectural firm of Daniel Burham and John Root were crafting designs for a new, grander hotel, completed in 1885. Within four months of opening, the second Montezuma Hotel burned, leaving the stone walls of the lower two floors. It was rebuilt for the third time, opening in August, 1886, and formally renamed the Phoenix Hotel, although the name Montezuma Hotel remained in use.

Folklore suggests that Billy the Kid and Jesse James used the springs after playing cards nearby.

== Description ==
There are three groupings of concrete soaking pools with sand and gravel bottoms of differing depths. Volunteers scrub the pools every two weeks, and there is a constant flow of fresh spring water that keeps them clean. The hottest pool, known as The Lobster Pot, has been landscaped and sculpted into a hillside. Another pool, known as The Cube, sits near the ruins of the old bathhouse, while the third grouping consists of two concrete pools, known as The Toaster. There are also several seeps nearby where the mud can be dug out to create primitive soaking pools.

== Balneotheraputic uses ==
The hot mineral springs at Montezuma were believed to have balneotheraputic properties. Soaking in the springs were thought to cure or relieve the symptoms of tuberculosis; for a time the springs served as an army hospital. In 1879, Doc Holliday stayed at the springs for treatment of tuberculosis, where he joined a club of health-seekers at the Adobe Hotel called the Lungers Club. The club promoted itself to potential members with TB, "Cure our maladies, we tuberculars unite. Coughing and wheezing we continue the fight. For rest and recuperations in hot springs we soak...bask in a warm sun and return to good health."

A brochure from 1883 publicized the hot springs as a "paradise for people afflicted with lung diseases and where they can be comfortable the year around."

== Water Profile ==
The hot spring water emerges from the ground at 138°F (59°C). The water temperatures of the soaking pools varies from 94°F to 120°F. The source of the spring water issues from fractured rocks at the intersection where the Gallinas River crosses the Montezuma Fault.

The water contains relatively dilute solutions of sodium-chloride-bicarbonate-sulfate, with moderate silica levels and very high fluoride levels (≤23 ppm). Compared to nearby hot springs, Montezuma mineral water contains less natural chloride and higher levels of bicarbonate and sulfate.

== Location ==
The hot springs are located across from the Gallinas River, now on the property of the Armand Hammer United World College former site of the Victorian hotel known as Montezuma's Castle which now serves as the college administration building.

== Gallery ==
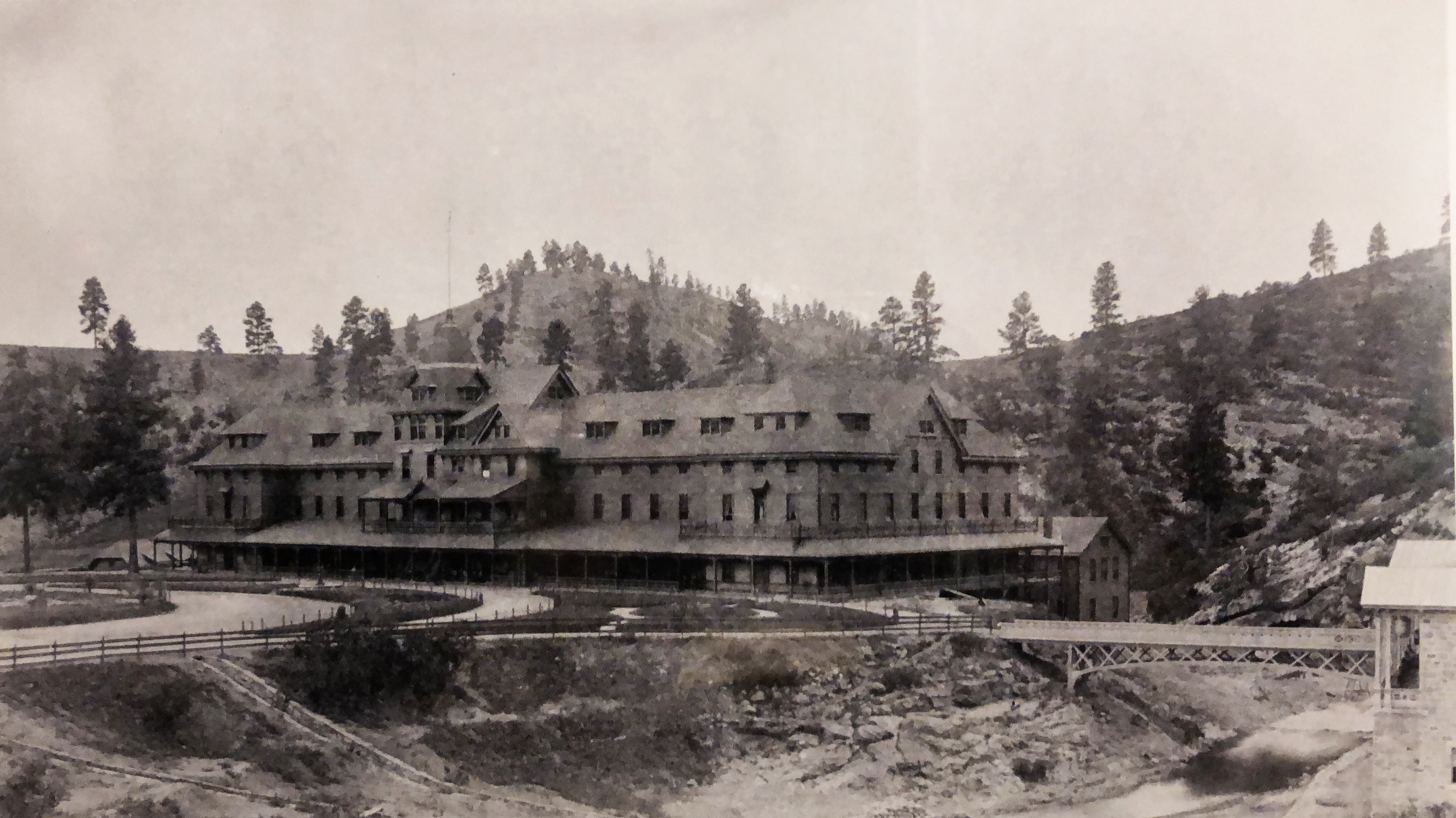
First Montezuma Hotel and hot springs bathhouse, c.1881-1884, photograph by James N. Furlong

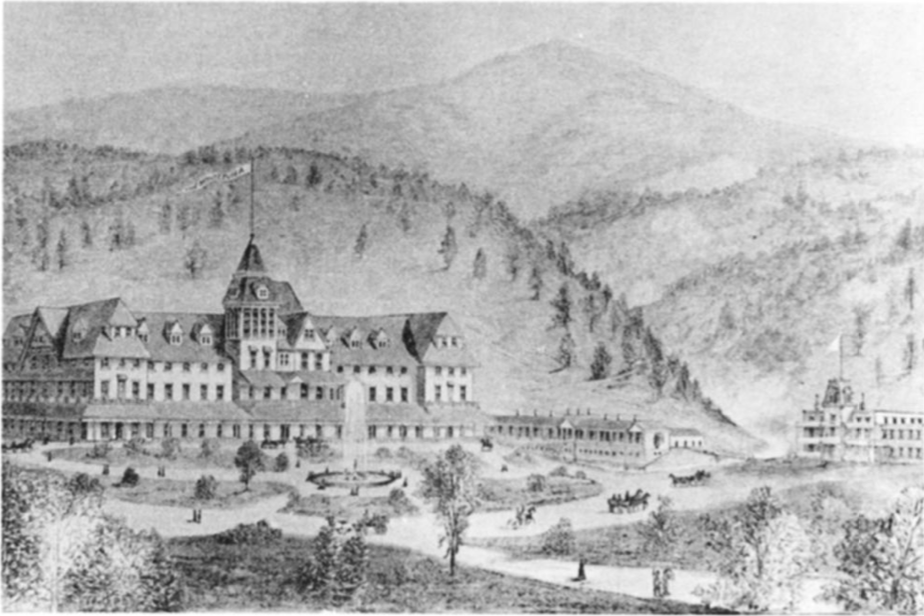
The first Montezuma Hotel, 1882, Las Vegas (Montezuma) Hot Springs

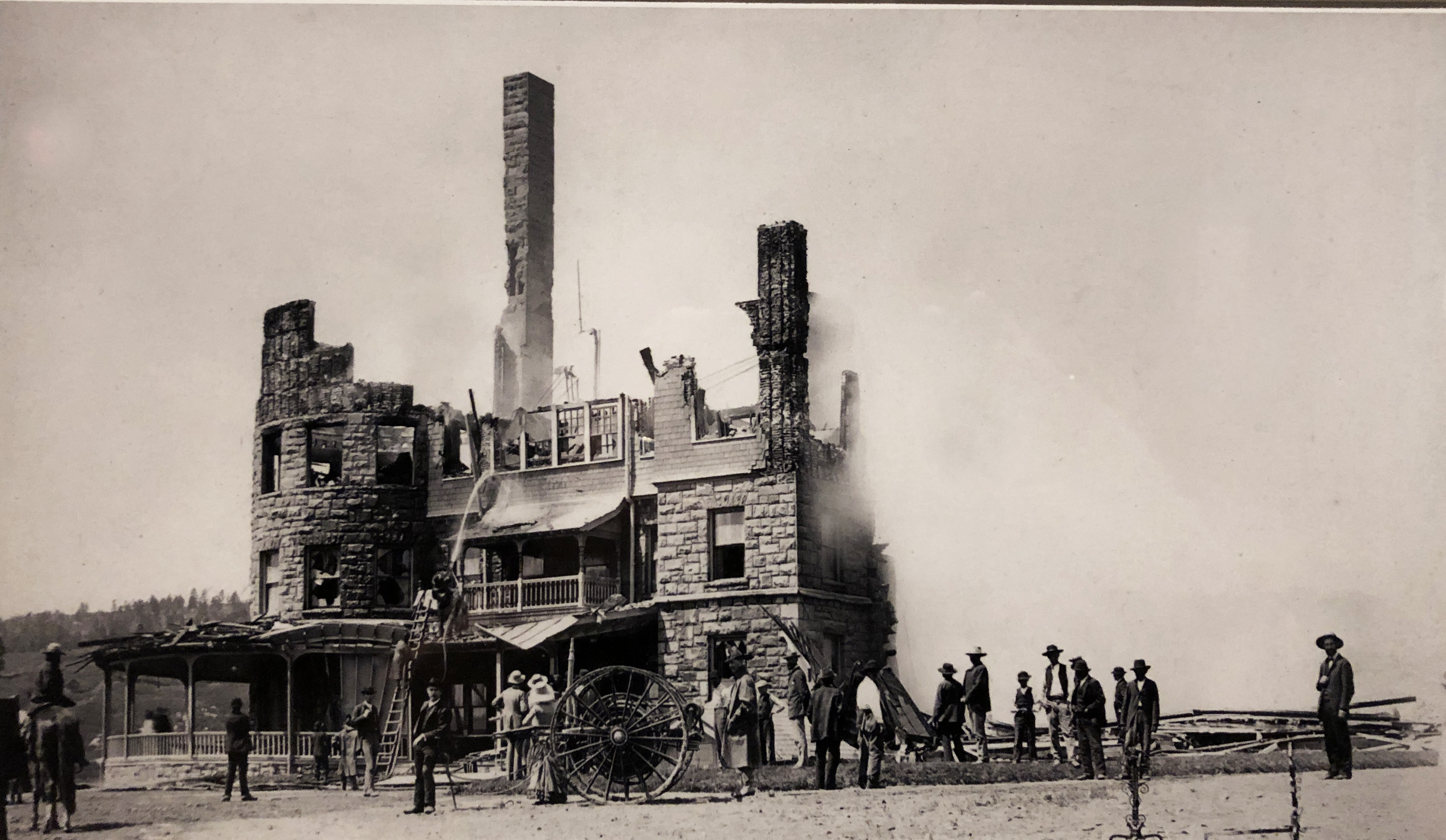
Second Montezuma Hotel after Aug. 8 1885 fire

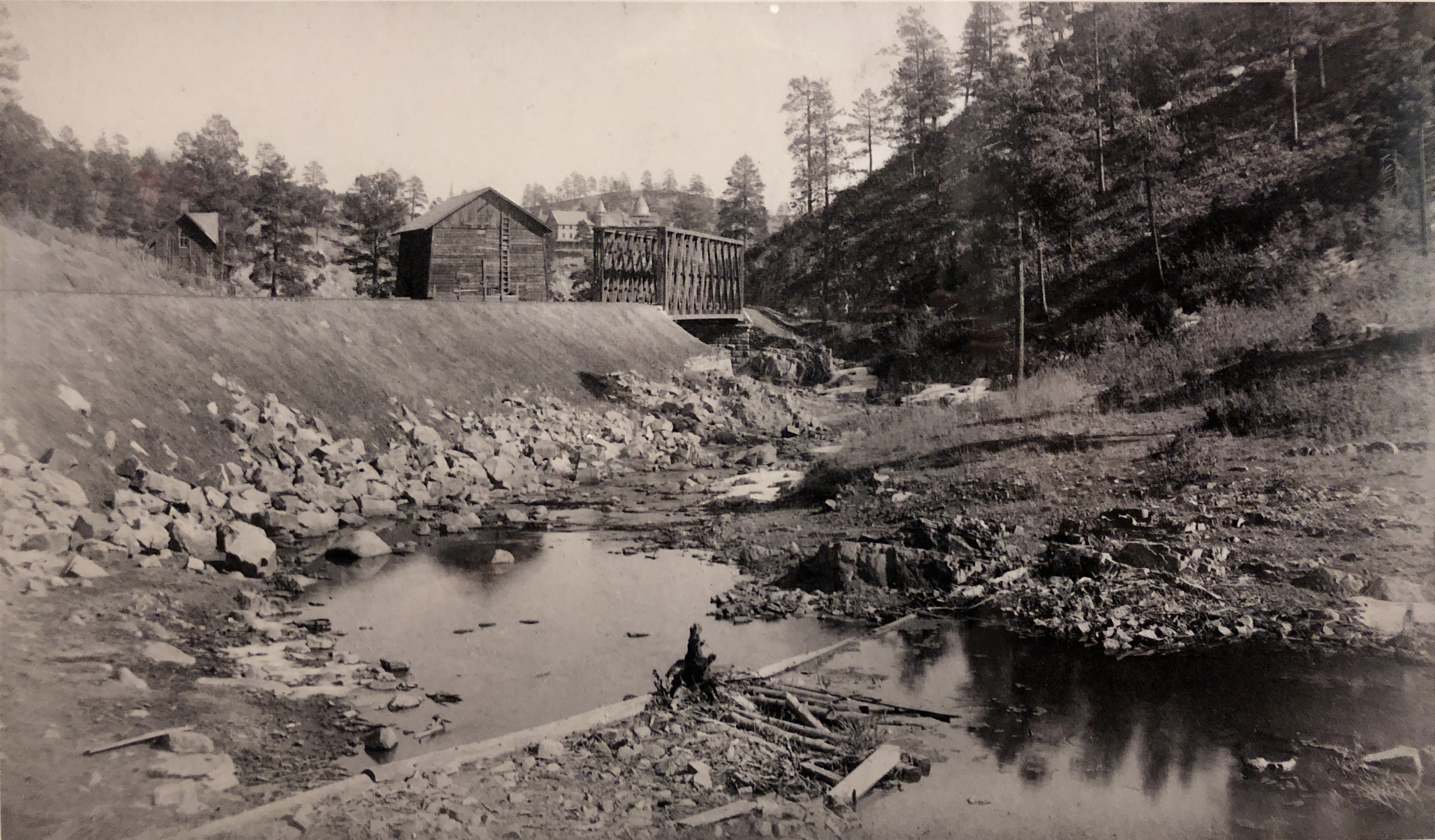
Ice house above hot springs, c.1875–1906, photograph by James N. Furlong

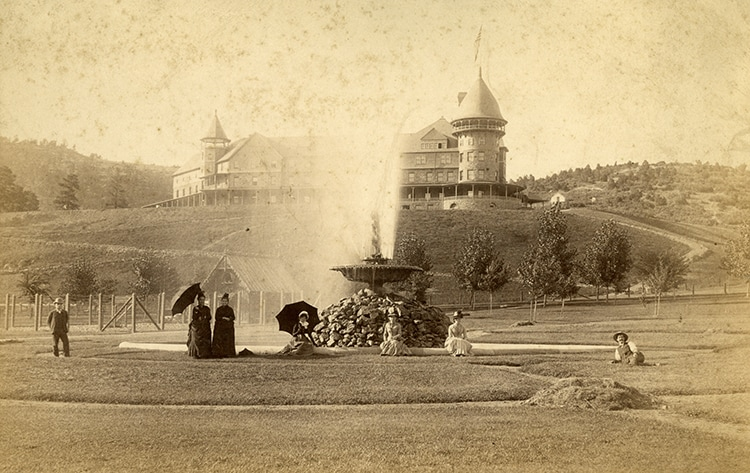
Montezuma Hotel, Las Vegas Hot Springs, New Mexico, photograph by Dana B. Chase, 1888

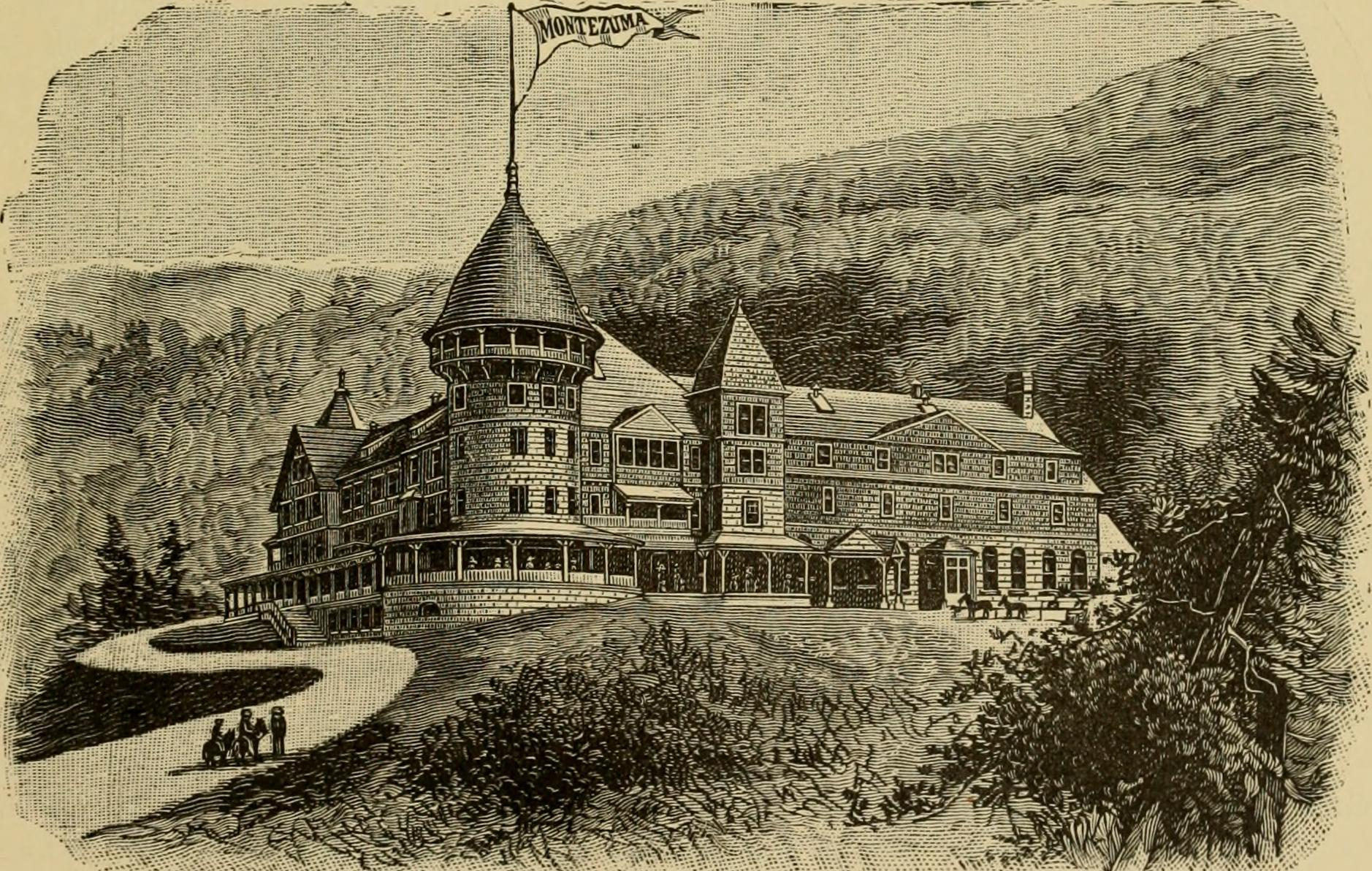
Third Montezuma Hot Springs Hotel (also known as the Phoenix Hotel), c.1890s

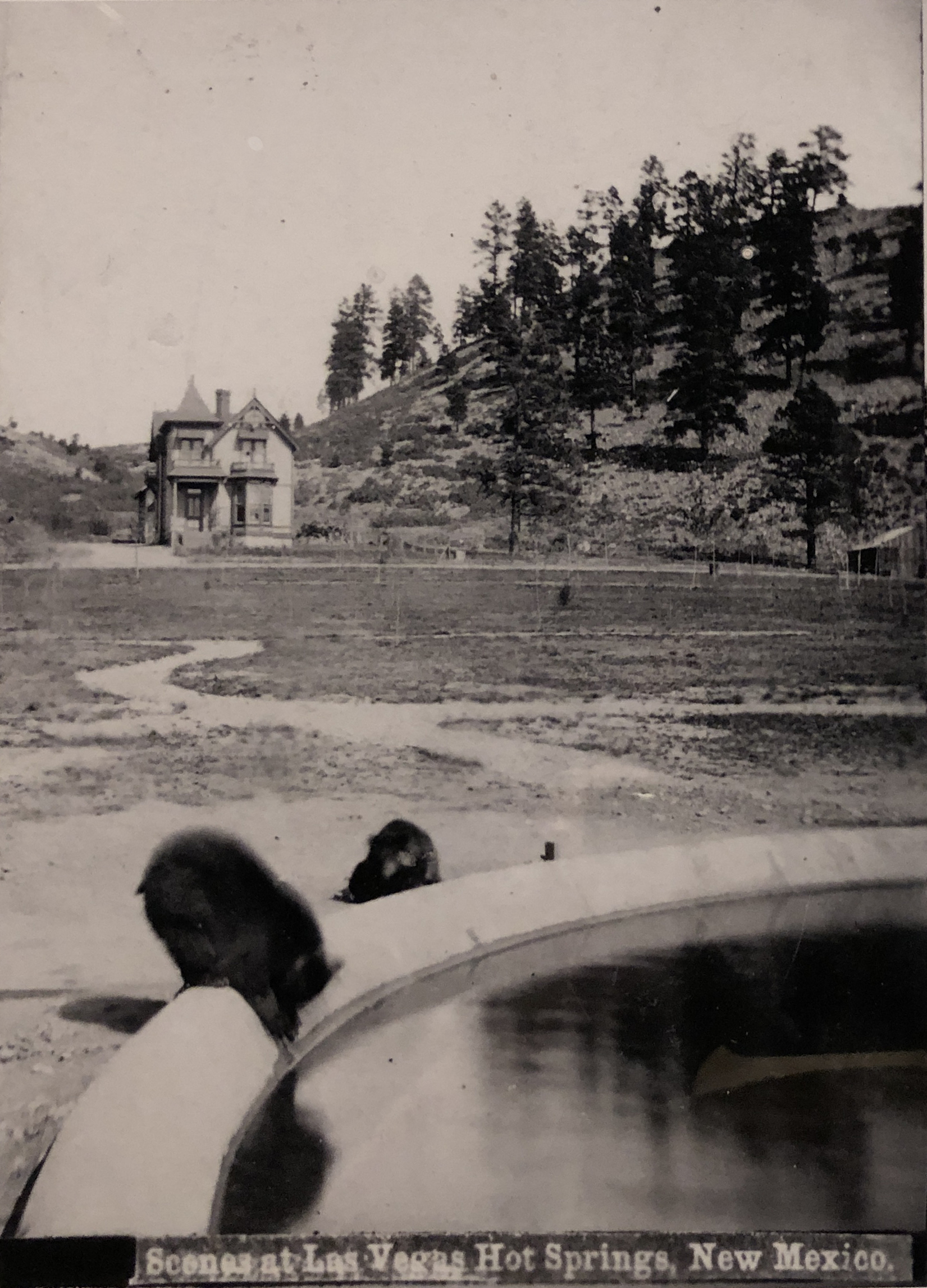
Bears drinking from fountain, Las Vegas Hot Springs, c.1878–1898

== See also ==
- List of hot springs in the United States
- List of hot springs in the world
- Montezuma Castle (hotel)
