= Montezuma Castle =

Montezuma Castle may refer to:

- Montezuma Castle National Monument in Camp Verde, Arizona
- Montezuma Castle (hotel), a former hotel in Montezuma, New Mexico
