= FM (film) =

1978 film by John A. Alonzo

- Original movie poster
- Directed by: John A. Alonzo
- Written by: Ezra Sacks
- Produced by: Rand Holston; Robert Larson
- Starring: Michael Brandon; Eileen Brennan; Alex Karras; Cleavon Little; Martin Mull; Cassie Yates; Linda Ronstadt; Jimmy Buffett
- Cinematography: David Myers
- Edited by: William Carruth; Jeff Gourson
- Distributed by: Universal Pictures
- Release date: April 28, 1978
- Running time: 104 minutes
- Country: United States
- Language: English
- Budget: $2 million
- Box office: $32.6 million (domestic) adjusted for inflation

FM is a 1978 American comedy drama film about internal conflicts at an FM radio station directed by John A. Alonzo and starring Michael Brandon, Eileen Brennan, Alex Karras, Cleavon Little, Martin Mull and Cassie Yates with special appearances by Linda Ronstadt and Jimmy Buffett in his feature film debut. The screenplay was written by Ezra Sacks.

The film was produced by Universal Pictures and originally released to theaters in the spring of 1978. The film performed poorly at the box office, but its soundtrack was a Platinum-certified disc, selling over one million records.

== Plot ==
Q-SKY program director and morning DJ Jeff Dugan builds a large fanbase by assembling a group of charismatic on-air personalities playing popular rock and roll. He soon finds that corporate management expects Jeff to use the station's position atop the ratings to sell more advertising time, and does so with the aid of a newly hired sales manager.

The new sales manager, Regis Lamar, presents him with the chance to advertise for the U.S. Army using a series of cheesy radio ads. When Jeff refuses to endorse the contract, Regis takes the issue to upper management. Jeff is then ordered to run the ads as provided by the Army and on the schedule specified in the advertising contract. Rather than comply, Jeff quits his job. All of the remaining DJs decide to take control of the station in a lock-in/sit-in/protest. They get listeners to gather in the street outside the station as a sort of protest while the DJs play music without any commercials.

Jeff wakes up the next morning to hear the DJs take control of the station. The crowd is already present when he arrives at the station. The DJs lift him up to the second storey with a fire hose as they have already barricaded the front doors. The lock-in lasts only until the police get an injunction to remove the staff. A tow truck rips off the front doors and the police enter the building. The DJs battle back by using a firehose and throwing tapes and other office stationery at the police.

The battle is resolved when Dugan finds himself fighting a policeman outside on an overhang. Jeff saves the policeman from falling off and decides that fighting is the wrong thing to do. He calms the crowd and announces that the DJs are coming out. Unknown to him, company owner Carl Billings has been watching from the crowd as the events unfolded. Billings steps forward and insists that the DJs stay in the station, fires his management staff responsible for the advertising conflict, and then joins the DJs inside the station.

== Cast ==
- Michael Brandon as Jeff Dugan
- Eileen Brennan as Mother
- Alex Karras as Doc (Holiday)
- Cleavon Little as Prince of Darkness
- Martin Mull as Eric Swan
- Cassie Yates as Laura Coe
- Norman Lloyd as Carl Billings
- Jay Fenichel as Bobby Douglas
- Brenda Venus as Dolores Deluxe
- James Keach as Lt. Reach
- Joe Smith as Albert Driscoll
- Tom Tarpey as Regis Lamar
- Robert Patten as Jack Rapp
- Peter Fox as Johnny Fury
- Linda Ronstadt as herself
- Jimmy Buffett as himself
- Tom Petty as himself
- REO Speedwagon as Themselves

== Production ==
The story unfolds across a background of concerts, broadcast music, appearances by various rock stars, and public appearances by the station's DJs. A minor sub-theme to the film is the competition between QSKY and another area radio station, KLAX. The major event of that sub-theme occurs when Jeff arranges to broadcast a live concert by Linda Ronstadt that is being sponsored by a competing radio station. Another minor sub-theme is the ongoing task of massaging egos of the various DJs to keep them happy and on the air.

Martin Mull appears in his feature film debut as libidinous, egotistical DJ Eric Swan. Rounding out the cast are Cleavon Little, who plays the Prince of Darkness, QSKY's overnight host (Little had previously played a disc jockey in the film Vanishing Point in 1971); Eileen Brennan as "Mother", the 40-something nighttime DJ; Alex Karras as "Doc Holiday", the midday DJ with the lowest ratings on the station who is eventually let go after the survey period; Cassie Yates as Laura Coe, who takes over Doc's midday slot; and Tom Tarpey as new sales manager Regis Lamar, the bane of the disc jockeys' existence. In addition, the film includes live appearances by Tom Petty and REO Speedwagon along with live performances by Linda Ronstadt and Jimmy Buffett. Steely Dan performed the title theme, which became a sizable hit. The Eagles, James Taylor, Bob Seger, Dan Fogelberg, Billy Joel, and Queen were featured on the Platinum-plus soundtrack album. It was the first film to feature Queen's music on its soundtrack; as of 2020 their songs had since appeared in nearly 100 other movies.

Record company executive Irving Azoff participated in the making of the film as executive producer, but he disowned it before release and asked that his name be removed from the credits, a request which Universal granted. Azoff said the film was "not an authentic representation of the music business" and that the studio reneged on its promise to allow him creative control over it, particularly regarding selections of music.

== Reception ==
The film received negative reviews. Janet Maslin of The New York Times wrote that the film "turns into a preposterously self-serving variation on 1960s' themes" and that the central problem in the plot "is certainly a real one, for rock radio stations everywhere. But Ezra Sacks's screenplay manages, by taking this crisis so very, very seriously, not to take it seriously at all." Variety called the film "the modern equivalent of the 1930s newspaper film, all break-neck dialog, quirky happenstances and behind-the-scenes drama transposed to a 1970s rock radio station. Unlike such classics as the original 'Front Page,' however, this Universal release goes nowhere with a potentially-fascinating set of plot elements." Gene Siskel of the Chicago Tribune gave the film 1.5 stars out of 4 and found "little reason to care" about the plot, as the sales manager "is a caricature that belongs on a TV variety show" and the "miserable deejays... do their best to make you want to switch stations. Unfortunately, you can't switch stations in a movie theater. All you can do is leave." Charles Champlin of the Los Angeles Times declared it "Fairly Mediocre" and "such claptrap silliness that only the tender in years and soft in mind are apt to be enraptured." Gary Arnold of The Washington Post panned the film as "a shallow attempt at rabble-rousing comedy" which "flounders in smarmy virtue" and "tries to be hip in all the worst ways." John Pym of The Monthly Film Bulletin wrote that the movie's central premise rests on the idea "that commercial, pop-music radio stations were not primarily created to generate advertising revenue, and that the people who put on the records and ad-lib between the jingles are folk heroes, free from the exigencies of the business world, members of that select cinematic breed of American independent professionals. Ezra Sacks' attenuated script, which alternates between episodes of jovial high jinks and moments of melancholy self-indulgence, fails to acknowledge the practical implications of this premise (namely that, without advertising, these 'creative' broadcasters would be out of work) and instead makes the army salesman a ludicrously over-drawn figure of fun and Regis Lamar a sycophantic yes-man."

Rolling Stone magazine considered the music heavily biased towards musicians who had been managed by Irving Azoff, who would become the head of the studio's then-corporate sibling MCA Records five years after the film's release.

The film holds a score of 20% on Rotten Tomatoes based on 10 reviews and was not successful at the box office.

Some reference books claim that the sitcom WKRP in Cincinnati was based on FM. The physical resemblance between Michael Brandon and WKRP lead actor Gary Sandy and the fact that their respective characters were both based upon KMET programming director Captain Mikey may have contributed to this speculation. However, WKRP series creator Hugh Wilson asserts that the sitcom was already in development when the film came out. He also states that he was "scared to death" when the film came out, afraid that it would eclipse the CBS sitcom, which made its debut in September 1978. Wilson was relieved when FM came and went from theaters quickly.

== Soundtrack ==
Despite the film's poor performance at the box office, the soundtrack sold over a million copies in its first several weeks. Steely Dan's "FM (No Static at All)" won engineers Al Schmitt and Roger Nichols the 1979 Grammy Award for Best Engineered Recording, Non-Classical.
