= Philippe Wamba =

American journalist

- Born: June 3, 1971; California, USA
- Died: September 11, 2002 (aged 31); Kenya
- Occupations: Editor and writer

Philippe Wamba (June 3, 1971 – September 11, 2002) was an African-American editor and writer known for his fusion of African and African-American culture.

== Early life ==
Wamba was born in California to Elaine Brown Wamba and Ernest Wamba dia Wamba, an American mother and a Congolese professor-turned-rebel father. He grew up in Boston, Dar es Salaam, and New Mexico. He completed his high school studies at the United World College in New Mexico, studied at Harvard University as an undergraduate, and then at Columbia University.

== Career ==
Wamba worked on a variety of writing and publishing projects, culminating in his service as Editor-in-chief of the now defunct online magazine Africana.com. In 1999, he published a memoir entitled Kinship: A Family's Journey in Africa and America. Wamba was profiled in the New York Times Magazine and the book received some positive reviews.

== Death ==
Wamba died in a car accident in Kenya while conducting research on African youth movements. The Harvard African Students Alumni Network announced plans to raise funds in his memory to promote traffic safety in Africa. Henry Louis Gates, a mentor who helped promote Wamba's memoir, said at his funeral, "Philippe lived on no man's hyphen."
