= Ed Bakey =

American film and television actor (1925–1988)

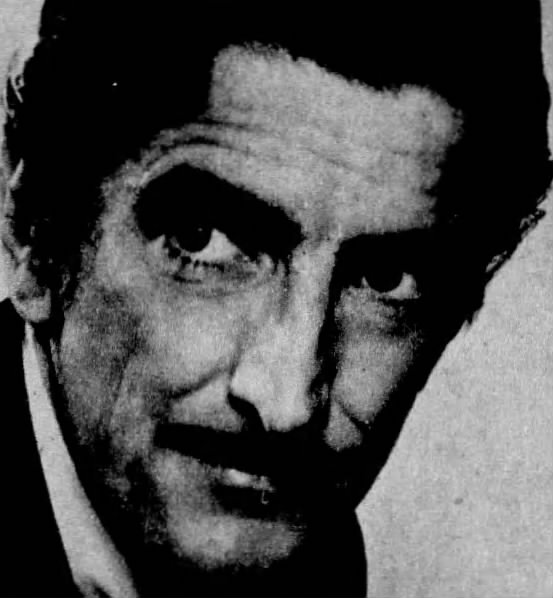
- Bakey in 1967
- Born: William Edward Baekey; November 13, 1925; Havre de Grace, Maryland, U.S.
- Died: May 4, 1988 (aged 62); Los Angeles, California, U.S.
- Education: Baltimore City College
- Occupations: Film and television actor
- Years active: 1944/1945–1988

William Edward Baekey (November 13, 1925 – May 4, 1988) was an American film and television actor.

== Life and career ==
Bakey was born in Havre de Grace, Maryland, and moved to Baltimore, Maryland at an early age. He attended Baltimore City College, graduating in 1943, and began his stage career in 1945 at the Hilltop Theatre. He later moved to New York to perform at the Provincetown Playhouse. He then worked as an announcer for the television station WBAL-TV and as a director for a radio station. In 1957 he appeared on the CBS television station WJZ-TV as the clown Pop-Pop in The Jack Wells Show. He also played the folk singer Eddie Greensleeve in Mike Wallace's radio program.

In 1966, Bakey played George Beenstock in the Broadway play Walking Happy. He began his screen career in 1967, appearing in the western television series Death Valley Days. He guest-starred in television programs including Gunsmoke, Mission: Impossible, The F.B.I., The Big Valley, Bonanza, The Streets of San Francisco, Cannon, Cimarron Strip, Dundee and the Culhane, The Guns of Will Sonnett, Night Gallery, Police Woman, One Day at a Time, Hill Street Blues and Star Trek.

Bakey appeared in films such as The White Buffalo, Zapped!, Darktown Strutters, The Evil, Heaven with a Gun, For Pete's Sake, The Baltimore Bullet and Telefon. In 1973, he appeared in the film The Sting, playing Granger. His final film credit was for the 1984 film The Philadelphia Experiment.

== Death ==
Bakey died on May 4, 1988 in Los Angeles, California, at the age of 62.
