= Pinar Karaca-Mandic =

Turkish-American economist

- Citizenship: Turkey; United States
- Education: University of California at Berkeley; Swarthmore College; Armand Hammer United World College of the American West
- Spouse: Vuk Mandic
- Children: 3
- Scientific career
- Fields: health economics
- Workplaces: Carlson School of Management; University of Minnesota School of Public Health; RAND Corporation
- Website: https://carlsonschool.umn.edu/faculty/pinar-karaca-mandic

Pinar Karaca-Mandic is an American economist who is C. Arthur Williams Jr. Professor in Healthcare Risk Management and Academic Director of the Medical Industry Leadership Institute at the University of Minnesota's Carlson School of Management and a Research Associate of the National Bureau of Economic Research (NBER). She was previously on the faculty of the University of Minnesota School of Public Health and an economist for the RAND Corporation.

Her research before 2020 focused on the adaptation of medical technology and health insurance markets.

During the COVID-19 pandemic, she has co-led a team of researchers collecting and publishing data on hospital capacity and COVID-19 hospitalization rates in the United States. This team has documented racial disparities in COVID-19 hospitalizations, as well as the relationship between the number of hospital beds occupied by COVID-19 patients and the death rate from COVID-19.

A native of Turkey, she has been active in raising funds to assist Refugees of the Syrian Civil War in Turkey.

== Selected works ==
- Karaca‐Mandic, Pinar, Edward C. Norton, and Bryan Dowd. "Interaction terms in nonlinear models." Health services research 47, no. 1pt1 (2012): 255–274.
- Goldman, Dana P., Geoffrey F. Joyce, and Pinar Karaca-Mandic. "Varying pharmacy benefits with clinical status: the case of cholesterol-lowering therapy." American Journal of Managed Care 12, no. 1 (2006): 21.
- Edlin, Aaron S., and Pinar Karaca-Mandic. "The accident externality from driving." Journal of Political Economy 114, no. 5 (2006): 931–955.
- Kamar, Ehud, Pinar Karaca-Mandic, and Eric Talley. "Going-private decisions and the Sarbanes-Oxley Act of 2002: A cross-country analysis." The Journal of Law, Economics, & Organization 25, no. 1 (2009): 107–133.
- Jena, Anupam B., Dana Goldman, Lesley Weaver, and Pinar Karaca-Mandic. "Opioid prescribing by multiple providers in Medicare: retrospective observational study of insurance claims." Bmj 348 (2014).
- Karaca-Mandic, Pinar, Anupam B. Jena, Geoffrey F. Joyce, and Dana P. Goldman. "Out-of-pocket medication costs and use of medications and health care services among children with asthma." Jama 307, no. 12 (2012): 1284–1291.
