= Cassie Yates =

American actress

- Yates in Detective in the House (1985)
- Born: Cassandra Yates; March 2, 1951 (age 75); Macon, Georgia, United States
- Occupation: Actress
- Years active: 1975–present

Cassandra Yates (born March 2, 1951) is an American actress.

== Early years ==
Yates was born and raised in Macon, Georgia. Her mother named her after the character Cassandra portrayed by Betty Field in Kings Row. When Yates was young, her family moved from Atlanta to Dublin, Georgia.

After studying art, Yates was a commercial illustrator before she began cutting hair and eventually opened her own beauty shop. Her first contact with acting came through night classes and performances in plays at little theaters.

== Career ==
Her most high-profile role was probably in Dynasty as Sarah Curtis. Yates also appeared in the 1981 TV version of John Steinbeck's Of Mice and Men. She appeared in various television series, including McMillan & Wife; Rich Man, Poor Man Book II; The Bionic Woman; The Streets of San Francisco; Barnaby Jones; Quincy, M.E.; Vega$; Simon & Simon; Magnum, P.I.; Hotel; Knots Landing; Cagney & Lacey; Thirtysomething and Murder, She Wrote in the 1984 episode "Deadly Lady".

In 1978, she starred as Laura Coe, a disc jockey, in the movie FM. She also played roles in two films directed by Sam Peckinpah: Convoy (1978), and The Osterman Weekend (1983). Her other film credits include Rolling Thunder (1977), F.I.S.T. (1978), The Evil (1978), St. Helens (1981) and Unfaithfully Yours (1984).

== Filmography ==
Year	Title	Role	Notes
1977	Rolling Thunder	Candy	
1978	F.I.S.T.	Molly	
1978	FM	Laura Coe	
1978	The Evil	Mary Harper	
1978	Convoy	Violet	
1981	St. Helens	Linda Steele	
1983	The Osterman Weekend	Betty Cardone	
1983	Caribbean Mystery, Agatha Christie	Lucky Dyson	
1984	Unfaithfully Yours	Carla Robbins	
1985	Perry Mason Returns	Julie Scott	
1992	I Don't Buy Kisses Anymore	Melinda	
1995	Guns and Lipstick	Shirley	
2018	The Other Side of the Wind	Martine	
