= St. Helens (film) =

1981 movie directed by Ernest Pintoff

- Genre: Adventure
- Screenplay by: Peter Bellwood; Larry Ferguson
- Story by: Michael Timothy Murphy; Larry Sturholm
- Directed by: Ernest Pintoff
- Starring: Art Carney; David Huffman; Cassie Yates; Albert Salmi; Ron O'Neal; Tim Thomerson; Bill McKinney; Henry Darrow; Nehemiah Persoff
- Music by: Goblin
- Country of origin: United States
- Original language: English

Production
- Executive producer: Michael T. Murphy
- Producers: Peter S. Davis; William N. Panzer
- Production locations: Mount St. Helens, Mount St. Helens National Volcanic Monument, Washington
- Cinematography: Jacques Haitkin
- Editor: George Berndt
- Running time: 90 minutes
- Production company: Davis-Panzer Productions

Original release
- Release: May 18, 1981

St. Helens is a 1981 made-for-cable HBO television film directed by Ernest Pintoff, and starring David Huffman, Art Carney, Cassie Yates, and Albert Salmi. The film centers on the events leading up to the cataclysmic 1980 eruption of Mount St. Helens in Washington, with the story beginning on the day volcanic activity started on March 20, 1980, and ending on the day of the eruption, May 18, 1980. The film premiered on May 18, 1981, on the first anniversary of the eruption.

== Plot ==
On March 20, 1980, an earthquake measuring 5.1 on the Richter scale struck Mt. St. Helens, signaling the first signs of volcanic activity there in 123 years. During the earthquake, a flock of quail becomes disoriented and smashes into the windshield of an Aerospatiale SA341G Gazelle helicopter in use for logging operations. The helicopter's pilot, Otis Kaylor, makes a successful emergency landing, only to be accused of nearly killing a group of loggers.

Shortly afterward, United States Geological Survey volcanologist David Jackson, a fictionalized version of David A. Johnston, arrives to investigate the activity. Upon arriving in the small town of Cougar, he quickly befriends Linda Steele, a single mother who works as a waitress at a restaurant named Whittaker's Inn. While at Whittaker's Inn, he stirs up concern with its owner, Clyde Whittaker, and a group of farmers and loggers. Meanwhile, the 83-year-old owner of the Mount St. Helens Lodge, Harry R. Truman, has a defiant attitude toward the idea of leaving his home on the slopes of the volcano.

After Washington declares a danger zone around the volcano and prohibits anyone from entering it, owners of property inside the prohibited area demand access to their property. To appease them, the state government agrees to let them into the danger zone as long as they sign waivers agreeing that the state has no liability for death or injury they suffer due to volcanic activity. On April 30, 1980, state officials in Cougar give them waivers of liability to sign.

As the volcanic activity increases, so does the attraction between David and Linda, and the two eventually fall in love. Presumably on the day before the eruption, David packs Linda and her son off to safety and stays behind for the scientific work he still needs to do on a ridge a few miles north of the volcano. Later that night, he pays a last visit to Harry.

On the morning of May 18, 1980, David hikes to a ridge 6 miles (10 km) north of Mount St. Helens to monitor a massive bulge that has been growing on the north face of the mountain for the past few weeks, while Harry goes fishing in Spirit Lake at the foot of the mountain. At 8:32 a.m. PDT the mountain's entire north face collapses in a massive landslide, causing the mountain to explode in a lateral eruption. The eruption kills both David and Harry and continues for hours. Pyroclastic flows destroy everything in their path, and lahars sweep down into the valley of the North Fork Toutle River, taking houses, trees, and bridges with them. Linda soon realizes the horror of the day's events when a radio announcer declares that David was one of the first victims.

The film ends with a scene of a small tree growing amidst the barren moonscape of the posteruption North Fork Toutle River valley.

== Cast ==
- Art Carney as Harry R. Truman
- David Huffman as David Jackson
- Cassie Yates as Linda Steele
- Albert Salmi as Clyde Whittaker
- Ron O'Neal as Otis Kaylor
- Tim Thomerson as Sheriff Dwayne Temple
- Bill McKinney as George Kilpatrick
- Redmond Gleeson as Hendricks
- Nehemiah Persoff as Mr. Ellison
- Henry Darrow as Lloyd Wagner
- Brendan Burns as David Crockett
- Van Hurst as Army National Guardsman
- Joseph Benti as newscaster

== Production ==
The entire movie was shot on location in Bend, Oregon, and at Mount Bachelor in Central Oregon's Cascade Range. In the film, both Mount Bachelor and the South Sister (of the Three Sisters volcanic chain) served as the pre-eruption Mount St. Helens, and the film opens with a picture of Mount Bachelor and the Central Oregon Cascades.

The setting for the pre-eruption Spirit Lake was actually Sparks Lake, located west of Mount Bachelor.

The setting for the Mount St. Helens Lodge was Elk Lake Lodge, located about 30 miles (48 km) from Bend along Cascade Lakes Scenic Byway.

The film used Cascade Lakes Scenic Byway (Cascade Lakes Highway) to depict Washington State Route 504 (known now as the Spirit Lake Memorial Highway).

The photos during the depiction of the May 18, 1980, eruption showing the north face of Mount St. Helens collapsing and exploding were taken by an amateur photographer at the Bear Meadow campsite 11 miles (18 km) northeast of the peak. The photographer, Gary Rosenquist, became a household name shortly after the eruption, and his photo sequence was widely used by the scientific community to reconstruct the events that led to the eruption.

The eruption images of Mount St. Helens were sourced from actual file footage of Mount St. Helens, much of it from ABC News, ABC affiliates KOMO-TV in Seattle, and KATU-TV in Portland.

One of the film's associate producers, Seattle filmmaker Otto Sieber, nearly lost his life in a filming expedition on Mount St. Helens shortly after the eruption. His film crew had been dropped off by helicopter in the area on May 23, 1980, and as they filmed the devastation, their compasses started malfunctioning due to the magnetic field differences in the volcanic ash. This resulted in them getting lost and nearly killed by a second large explosion on May 25, 1980. Brief clips from the 1980 documentary film The Eruption of Mount St. Helens! filmed during that expedition were included in the movie, as were clips from a previous expedition to the Mount St. Helens area several weeks before the May 18, 1980, eruption.

Filming of the movie began in November 1980 and finished in April 1981. The film premiered on May 18, 1981, on the first anniversary of the eruption. The film was given a limited theatrical release, mostly in the Pacific Northwest.

Film production crews used facilities at the Inn of the Seventh Mountain resort in Seventh Mountain, Oregon, for lodging and production offices.

Gerri Whiting, the sister of lodge owner Harry Truman, served as a historical consultant for the film. According to her, Harry Truman and David Johnston were indeed friends and spent some time together.

One of the film's writers was Larry Sturholm, a Portland and Seattle television news reporter and personality known for humorous local news stories. Sturholm was murdered in 1989 before his subsequent screenplay, Shadow Games, could be completed.

== Release ==
St. Helens was first broadcast on television in the United States on May 18, 1981. In the Philippines, the film was theatrically released as Last Eruption by Mega Films on October 10, 2001.

== Controversy ==
The behavior of the movie's David Johnston character sparked controversy. David Johnston's parents criticized the film, arguing that it possessed not "an ounce of David in it" and that the fictional Johnston character portrayed him "as a daredevil rather than a careful scientist." Johnston's mother stated that the film had misrepresented many aspects of the eruption and had depicted her son falsely as "a rebel" with "a history of disciplinary trouble." Johnston's family threatened to sue the makers of the film because they felt that it had sullied his memory.

Prior to the film's premiere, 36 scientists who knew Johnston signed a letter of protest against the depiction of Johnston in the form of the David Johnston character. They wrote, "Dave's life was too meritorious to require fictional embellishments," and "Dave was a superbly conscientious and creative scientist." Johnston's friend, USGS geologist Don Swanson, who, due to other commitments had convinced Johnston to take his place at the Coldwater II observation post on the day of the eruption, believed that a movie based on Johnston's true life and exploits would have been a hit because of his friend's character.
