= The Evil (1978 film) =

1978 American supernatural horror film directed by Gus Trikonis

- Theatrical poster
- Directed by: Gus Trikonis
- Written by: Galen Thompson; Gus Trikonis
- Produced by: Ed Carlin
- Starring: Richard Crenna; Joanna Pettet; Andrew Prine; Cassie Yates; Victor Buono
- Cinematography: Mario DiLeo (as Mario Di Leo)
- Edited by: Jack Kirschner
- Music by: Johnny Harris
- Production company: Rangoon Productions
- Distributed by: New World Pictures
- Release date: March 8, 1978
- Running time: 89 minutes
- Country: United States
- Language: English
- Budget: $700,000

The Evil (also known as Cry Demon and House of Evil) is a 1978 American supernatural horror film directed by Gus Trikonis and starring Richard Crenna, Joanna Pettet, Andrew Prine and Victor Buono. Its plot follows a husband-and-wife team of doctors who attempt to open a rehabilitation center in a mansion built over a gateway to hell.

== Plot ==
Psychiatrist C.J. Arnold buys an abandoned mansion, once owned by a Civil War general named Emilio Vargas, which was built over hot sulfur pits. There, he plans to set up a drug rehab center. C.J. recruits a group of volunteers to help clean up and renovate the large house. Almost immediately, C.J.'s wife, Dr. Caroline Arnold, senses a presence that starts to manifest as a ghostly apparition. Soon thereafter, more strange and eerie things start to happen which start to agitate the volunteers, and their dog.

Later, C.J. discovers a trapdoor in the basement, which he opens and unknowingly unleashes a menacing spirit. Suddenly, all of the doors and windows become locked, trapping everyone inside the mansion. They soon discover that the trap door in the basement is a gateway into Hell. While Felicia is resting, she is suddenly attacked by an invisible force that beats her and tears off her clothing. Her screams are heard by the others, who come to console her. The group attempts to find a way out of the house, and decides to scale the wall from a turret on the house. Peter attempts to descend using a rope but is overtaken by an invisible force. C.J. attempts to pull him back to safety, but the rope becomes inexplicably hot before Pete's body spontaneously combusts and falls to the ground.

Further attempts to escape are fruitless, including the men attempting to saw the front door open with a skill saw, as the blade inexplicably wears down rapidly, inflicting no damage on the wood. While doing so, Raymond inadvertently saws through his own hand. Mary flees upstairs to retrieve bandages. The dog attacks her in the hallway, knocking them both over the staircase railing, causing them to fall to their deaths.

C.J. begins storing all of the deceaseds' bodies in an enclosed porch, but shortly after finds that Mary's body has vanished. Meanwhile, Caroline witnesses the apparition of a man motioning for her to pick up an iron cross in the parlor. When she does, the apparition vanishes. She subsequently finds C.J., Raymond, and Felicia standing over Mary's corpse in a trancelike state; when she appears with the cross, however, it drives the three into a fit, and they return to consciousness, unaware of what just occurred. A short time later, Laurie, Felicia, and Raymond attempt to melt the iron bars covering the windows with electrical cables. During the attempt, Laurie is dragged upstairs by an unseen entity. Raymond chases after her but is thrown down the staircase by the force. In a panic, Raymond and Felicia resume their endeavor, but Felicia is killed when Mary's corpse reanimates, startling her and causing her to fall back against the iron bars, fatally electrocuting her.

The electricity causes the bars in one of the windows to melt, and Raymond leaps through the window. As he runs away from the house, however, the ground beneath him turns to quicksand, and he sinks into the mud, drowning. Meanwhile, Caroline becomes possessed by Vargas, whose apparition she has repeatedly seen. Vargas, using Caroline's body as a conduit, tells C.J. he has released "the evil" in the house by unlocking the pit. Vargas reveals that prior to C.J. and Caroline coming to the house with their group, Vargas was forced to sacrifice the life of the house's caretaker as a warning to others to stay away from the mansion. However, the warning was not heeded, leaving the death of Vargas' victim in vain. Together, C.J. and Caroline descend into the basement to close the pit, but are overcome by a powerful force that knocks Caroline into the pit. C.J. descends into the pit to get her, and the two find a series of tunnels. There, C.J. enters a white cavern, where he is confronted by the Devil, who threatens and tortures C.J., beginning to break his mind. Caroline suddenly appears with the cross, thrusting it into the Devil's chest. She and C.J. flee, escaping the pit and sealing it. At that moment, the windows and doors of the house spontaneously unlock. They rush outside while Vargas' spirit watches from a window.

== Cast ==
- Richard Crenna as C.J. Arnold
- Joanna Pettet as Dr. Caroline Arnold
- Andrew Prine as Prof. Raymond Guy
- Cassie Yates as Mary Harper
- George O'Hanlon Jr. as Pete Brooks
- Lynne Moody as Felicia Allen
- Mary Louise Weller as Laurie Belman
- Robert Viharo as Dwight (as George Viharo)
- Victor Buono as The Devil
- Milton Selzer as The Realtor
- Ed Bakey as Sam the Caretaker
- Galen Thompson as Emilio Vargas

== Location ==
The movie was filmed at Montezuma Castle in New Mexico.

== Release ==
The Evil was released theatrically in the spring of 1978, with screenings beginning on March 8 in San Francisco. (Note: Several newspaper advertisements note the film as "starting today" on Wednesday, March 8, 1978.)

== Critical response ==
Variety reviewed the film favorably, writing that the film has a "psychological insight [that] is rare in suspensers, and is a credit to both Crenna, who delivers a strong performance, and director Gus Trikonis. Fulcrum of pic’s success or failure comes in final scenes, when Crenna and Pettet confront the devil himself, played with sinister angelicism by Victor Buono." Linda Gross of the Los Angeles Times deemed the film "a scary and atmospheric thriller" with "excruciating suspense," also praising the performances and music. Bob Keaton of the Fort Lauderdale News noted the plot as "familiar," but conceded that "for those who enjoy the genre, The Evil is just their cup of horror."

Patrick Taggart of the Austin American-Statesman was less laudatory of the film, characterizing it as "yet another horror movie set in an old mansion ... The actors seem absolutely bored to death, as you likely will be after 20 minutes' worth of viewing ... Gus Trikonis directed with a flair that elevated tedium to the level of religion." Daniel Ruth of The Tampa Tribune was also critical of the film, writing that "the film is about as original as a room at the Holiday Inn ... It is a film that stretches the limits of tastelessness with gratuitous displays of blood-letting for the sake of pursuing obtuse theological questions of right versus wrong, good versus evil."

== See also ==
- List of ghost films
