= Montezuma Castle (hotel) =

- Montezuma Hotel Complex
- U.S. National Register of Historic Places
- U.S. Historic district
- NM State Register of Cultural Properties
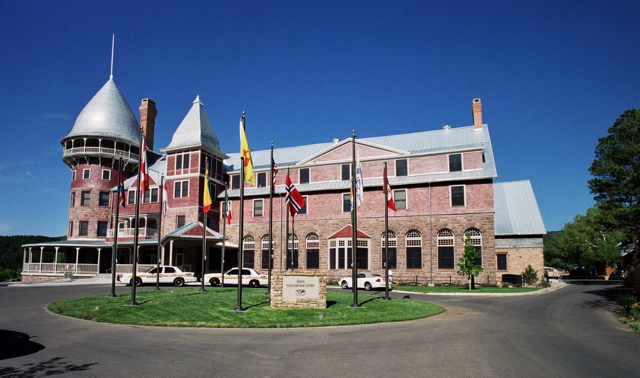
- The Montezuma Castle, on the campus of the United World College, USA, May 2003

- Location within New Mexico Location within the United States
- Nearest city: Las Vegas, New Mexico
- Coordinates: 35°39′15″N 105°16′53″W
- Area: 73 acres (30 ha)
- Built: 1885
- Architect: John Wellborn Root
- Architectural style: Queen Anne
- NRHP reference No.: 74001203
- NMSRCP No.: 227

Significant dates
- Added to NRHP: May 3, 1974
- Designated NMSRCP: December 30, 1971

The Montezuma Castle is a 90,000-square-foot (8,400 m^{2}), 400 room Queen Anne style hotel building erected just northwest of the city of Las Vegas, New Mexico in 1886 (the site was at the time called "Las Vegas Hot Springs," but is now known as "Montezuma"). The existing castle is the third on the site. The first two (dating to 1881 and 1885) were the first buildings in New Mexico to have electric lighting, and they both burned down.

Since 1981 the castle has served as the centerpiece of the United World College USA's campus. Over 200 students aged 16-19 from around 90 countries are housed and educated at the site.

== History as hotel ==
The castle was the third hotel constructed by the Atchison, Topeka & Santa Fe Railroad in Montezuma as a luxury hotel, capitalizing on the natural hot springs on the site. These were widely thought to ease the suffering of people with tuberculosis, "chronic rheumatism, gout, biliary, and renal calculi." The nearby Gallinas Creek also provided excellent trout fishing.

Guests included Theodore Roosevelt, Rutherford B. Hayes, Ulysses S. Grant, William Tecumseh Sherman, John C. Frémont, and Jesse James (who stayed at a predecessor hotel on the same property). Later articles would cite an improbable array of foreign dignitaries as having been guests, including Kaiser Wilhelm of Germany and Emperor Hirohito of Japan. However, some members of European royal families certainly did visit, including Henry Manners, 8th Duke of Rutland, John Campbell, 9th Duke of Argyll, and his wife, Princess Louise, Duchess of Argyll. "The visitors to the Hot Springs represent every part of the continent of America, and nearly every tourist from abroad who crosses the continent by the southerly route stops there for a time."

In addition to the natural recreation available in Montezuma, the hotel provided bowling alleys and billiard rooms. The building was designed and construction was overseen by the Chicago architecture firm Burnham and Root.

It operated as a hotel until October 31, 1903, when the railroad deemed it unprofitable. The building was used as a training center by Jim Flynn when he was preparing for his 1912 boxing match with Jack Johnson (the fight was held in nearby Las Vegas, New Mexico). The complex was briefly owned by the YMCA, then operated as a Baptist college from 1922 until 1931. The Southern Baptist Church sold it to the Catholic Church in 1937, and it was operated as a seminary for Mexican Jesuits until 1972. The building then sat empty for a decade and was subject to significant vandalism and decay. The Jesuits made a little money renting the building out as the set for the low budget horror movie The Evil in 1977.

== United World College ==
In 1981, the castle and the surrounding 100 acres were purchased by industrialist and philanthropist Armand Hammer for use as a United World College. However, the building required extensive repairs before it could be used as a new college facility. Unfortunately, funds were unavailable at the time to make these repairs possible. However, in 1997, it was placed on the list of America's Most Endangered Historic Places by the National Trust for Historic Preservation, along with landmarks like Ellis Island. In 2000 and 2001, the school invested over $10.5 million into restoring the building, and it has won awards as one of the great historical restorations in the United States. It is also the first historic property west of the Mississippi to be designated one of "America's Treasures" by the White House Millennium Council.

Today, the Montezuma Castle, or Davis International Center as it is now known, houses multiple college facilities including the school dining hall, guest and dorm rooms, offices, classrooms, rehearsal spaces, and a student center complete with a store, laundry rooms, pool tables, a dance space, and a kitchen.

The building is not open to the public except when the Armand Hammer United World College, also known as UWC-USA, offers student-led tours of the building on scheduled dates. A list of these dates can be found on the college's website.

== See also ==
- National Register of Historic Places listings in San Miguel County, New Mexico
- Montezuma Hot Springs
