= United World College, USA =

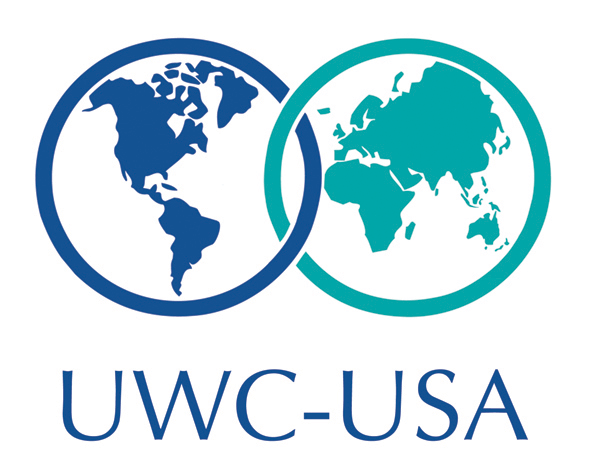

Location
- State Route 65; Montezuma, New Mexico 87731

Information
- Type: Independent; Boarding
- Motto: UWC makes education a force to unite people, nations and cultures for peace and a sustainable future
- Established: 1982
- Head of School: Dr. Andrew Mahlstedt
- Faculty: 34
- Enrollment: 228
- Average class size: 15
- Student to teacher ratio: 9:1
- Campus: Rural, 110 acres (0.45 km^{2})
- Colors: Blue and teal
- Newspaper: Castle on the Hill
- Affiliation: United World Colleges, International Baccalaureate
- Website: uwc-usa.org

The United World College, USA (UWC-USA) is a United World College school in Montezuma, New Mexico, United States. It was founded in 1982, with financial support from businessman Armand Hammer, who donated the historic Montezuma Castle (hotel) site for the campus.

UWC-USA is a two-year, independent, co-educational boarding school accredited by the Independent Schools Association of the Southwest, serving high school students aged 16 to 19 from around the world, many on scholarships.

== History ==
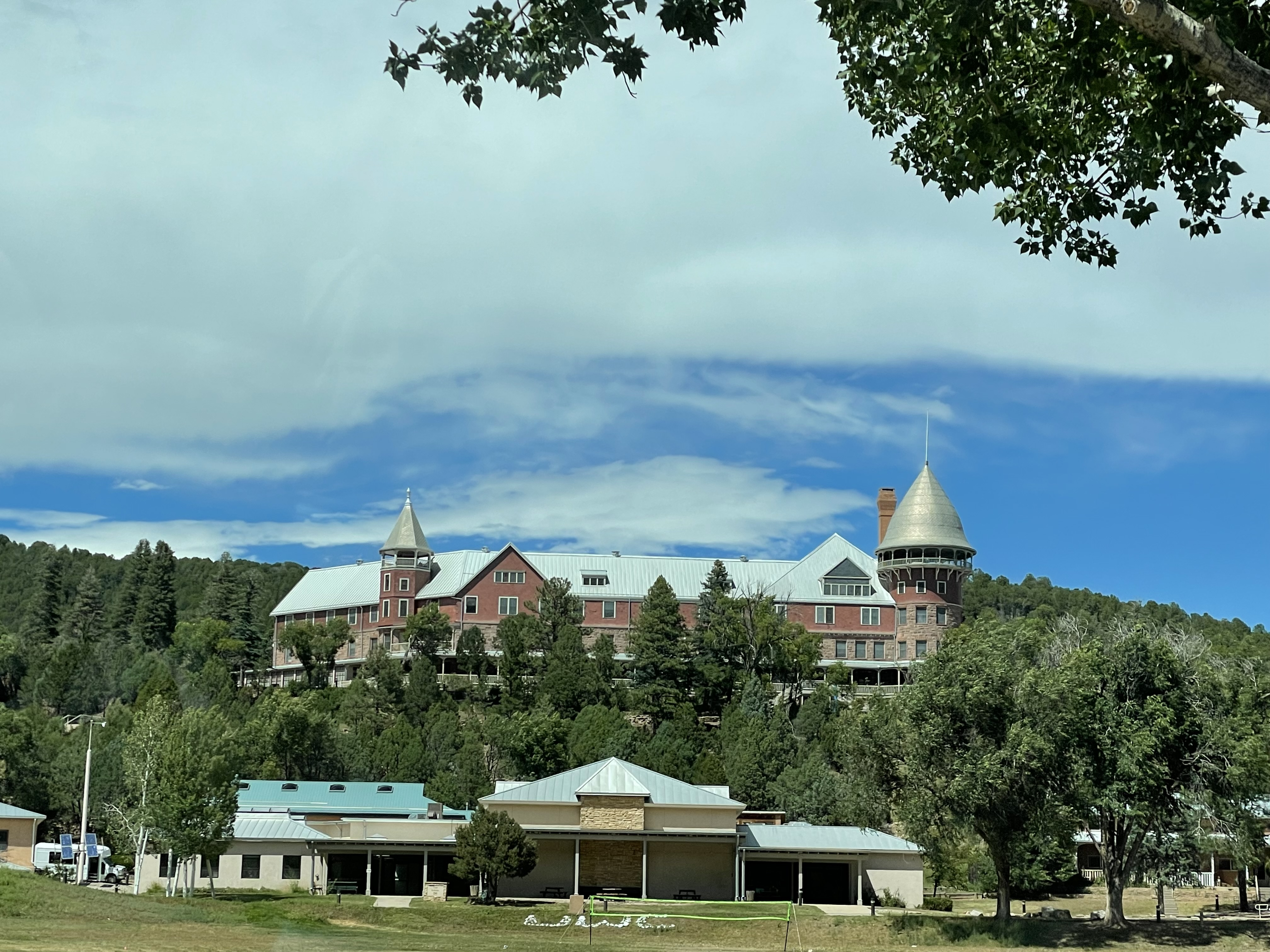
A view of the UWC-USA campus.

American mogul Armand Hammer's The Armand Hammer Foundation purchased the property in Montezuma to establish a United World College in the United States in 1981. Major renovations of existing buildings preceded the school's opening to make it an appropriate site for a residential educational institution.

The school opened in the fall of 1982 as the Armand Hammer United World College of the American West, an event that was attended by King Charles III, then Prince of Wales, in his capacity as president of the United World Colleges at the time. The inaugural class of students consisted of 104 young people, from 49 countries.

The school's founding president was Theodore D. Lockwood, who served from 1982 until 1993 and had previously served as president of Trinity College in Hartford, Connecticut. Dr. William McGill, president emeritus of Columbia University, was the founding chairman of the board of trustees. Philip O. Geier served as president from 1993 until 2005, when he passed the reins to Lisa A. H. Darling, whose presidency ended in 2013. The school's fourth president was Dr. Mukul Kumar '89, an alumnus and leader in international education, who left the school in 2016, and was followed by Dr. Victoria Mora. Born in Albuquerque, a mother as well as a former Dean of the Santa Fe campus of St. John's College, she led the college until 2025. The fifth and current president is Dr. Andrew Mahlstedt, who took the role following other roles in the UWC movement, including at UWC Mostar in Bosnia and Herzegovina, and UWC Mahindra in India.

In 1998, the school's endowment was significantly increased through the generosity of investment manager Shelby M.C. Davis and his wife Gale. Their gift today secures the largest block of the school's student scholarships and provides $25,000 scholarships for all Americans who attend this school (or any other UWC) after being admitted by the U.S. national committee. Their initial gift of $45 million in 1998 was, at the time, the largest private donation ever made to international education.

In late 2007, The Wall Street Journal identified UWC-USA as one of the world's top 20 schools for its success in preparing students to enter top American universities. In 2010, UWC-USA was ranked a "Top Ten Program" by U.S. Center for Citizen Diplomacy.

== Location ==
The school's campus is based at the historic Montezuma Castle, in the foothills of the Sangre de Cristo Mountains. It is located at 35°39′15″N 105°16′52″W in the town of Montezuma, New Mexico, just northwest of the city of Las Vegas, New Mexico, about 70 mi (110 km) from Santa Fe.

A structural artwork and secular space on the campus, Dwan Light Sanctuary (1996), was founded by Virginia Dwan in collaboration with solar spectrum artist Charles Ross and architect Laban Wingert. The artwork is open to the public.

== Notable alumni ==
- Sal Lavallo, American traveller
- Lousewies van der Laan, Dutch politician
- Michael Sugar, producer of Spotlight, winner of Academy Award for Best Film, 2016
- Philippe Wamba, American journalist
- Pavlos, Crown Prince of Greece
- Richard Rowley, film director
- Giulio Regeni, Italian student abducted and tortured to death in Egypt.
- Iqbaal Ramadhan, Indonesian actor
- Emma Tucker, editor of The Sunday Times and The Wall Street Journal
- Pinar Karaca-Mandic, health economist
- Paul Grimes, Australian public servant
- Gina Neff, American sociologist and author
- David Rueda, professor of politics and economics at Oxford University
- Mukul Chadda, Indian actor
- Demet Tuncer, Turkish actress
