= Gallinas River (New Mexico) =

Coordinates: 35°10′02″N 104°55′30″W

Gallinas River or Rio Gallinas is a river with its source in San Miguel County, New Mexico, and confluence with the Pecos River in Guadalupe County, New Mexico. It is a tributary of the Pecos River, which is a tributary of the Rio Grande. The river has a tributary, Gallinas Creek, with its confluence just southeast of Las Vegas, New Mexico.

The Rio Gallinas was listed as one of America's Most Endangered Rivers of 2023 due to drought and the impact of the Calf Canyon/Hermits Peak Fire on the watershed.
