= 2026–27 Columbus Blue Jackets season =

National Hockey League season

2026–27 Columbus Blue Jackets
- Division: Metropolitan
- Conference: Eastern
- 2026–27 record: 9–12–0
- Home record: 6–6–0
- Road record: 3–6–0
- Goals for: 46
- Goals against: 63

Team information
- General manager: Don Waddell
- Coach: Rick Bowness
- Captain: Vacant
- Alternate captains: Zach Werenski; Rotating; Charlie Coyle; Sean Monahan; Mathieu Olivier; Cole Sillinger
- Arena: Nationwide Arena
- Minor league affiliate: Cleveland Monsters (AHL)

Team leaders
- Goals: Kent Johnson (8)
- Assists: Zach Werenski (13)
- Points: Kent Johnson (19)
- Penalty minutes: Mathieu Olivier (32)
- Plus/minus: Zach Werenski (+5)
- Wins: Cam Talbot (5)
- Goals against average: Cam Talbot (2.67)

The 2026–27 Columbus Blue Jackets season is the 27th season for the National Hockey League (NHL) franchise that was established on June 25, 1997.

== Standings ==
=== Divisional standings ===
Metropolitan Division
Pos	Team	GP	W	L	OTL	RW	GF	GA	GD	Pts
1	Carolina Hurricanes	23	17	3	3	16	95	53	+42	37
2	New Jersey Devils	23	15	8	0	10	88	73	+15	30
3	New York Rangers	22	13	8	1	13	67	58	+9	27
4	New York Islanders	22	11	6	5	9	71	63	+8	27
5	Philadelphia Flyers	26	9	11	6	8	67	88	−21	24
6	Washington Capitals	21	10	11	0	8	72	83	−11	20
7	Columbus Blue Jackets	21	9	12	0	4	54	68	−14	18
8	Pittsburgh Penguins	22	7	13	2	3	67	80	−13	16

Updated to game(s) played on November 21, 2026. Source: National Hockey League
Rules for classification: 1) Fewer number of games played (GP, only during regular season); 2) Greater number of regulation wins (RW); 3) Greater number of wins in regulation and overtime, excluding shootout wins (ROW); 4) Greater number of total wins, including shootouts (W); 5) Greater number of points earned in head-to-head play; if teams played an uneven number of head-to-head games, the result of the first game on the home ice of the team with the extra home game is discarded; 6) Greater goal differential (GD); 7) Greater number of goals scored (GF)

=== Conference standings ===
Eastern Conference Wild Card
Pos	Div	Team	GP	W	L	OTL	RW	GF	GA	GD	Pts
1	AT	Boston Bruins	23	15	7	1	12	83	61	+22	31
2	AT	Florida Panthers	24	13	8	3	11	76	71	+5	29
3	ME	New York Islanders	22	11	6	5	9	71	63	+8	27
4	ME	Philadelphia Flyers	26	9	11	6	8	67	88	−21	24
5	AT	Buffalo Sabres	23	9	10	4	7	67	81	−14	22
6	ME	Washington Capitals	21	10	11	0	8	72	83	−11	20
7	AT	Detroit Red Wings	23	8	12	3	6	60	71	−11	19
8	AT	Toronto Maple Leafs	25	8	14	3	7	78	90	−12	19
9	ME	Columbus Blue Jackets	21	9	12	0	4	54	68	−14	18
10	ME	Pittsburgh Penguins	22	7	13	2	3	67	80	−13	16

Updated to game(s) played on November 21, 2026. Source: National Hockey League
Rules for classification: 1) Fewer number of games played (GP, only during regular season); 2) Greater number of regulation wins (RW); 3) Greater number of wins in regulation and overtime, excluding shootout wins (ROW); 4) Greater number of total wins, including shootouts (W); 5) Greater number of points earned in head-to-head play; if teams played an uneven number of head-to-head games, the result of the first game on the home ice of the team with the extra home game is discarded; 6) Greater goal differential (GD); 7) Greater number of goals scored (GF)

== Schedule and results ==
=== Preseason ===
The Columbus Blue Jackets preseason schedule was released on June 23, 2026.

2026 preseason game log: 3–1–0 (home: 2–0–0; road: 1–1–0)
#	Date	Visitor	Score	Home	OT	Decision	Attendance	Record	Recap
1	September 21	Detroit	0–1	Columbus	SO	Copley	12,300	1–0–0
2	September 22	Columbus	1–5	Buffalo		Talbot	16,328	1–1–0
3	September 24	Pittsburgh	0–4	Columbus		Talbot	14,056	2–1–0
4	September 26	Columbus	4–2	Detroit		Greaves	16,592	3–1–0

=== Regular season ===
The Columbus Blue Jackets regular season schedule was released on July 16, 2026.

2026–27 game log

October: 5–7–0 (home: 4–3–0; road: 1–4–0)
#	Date	Visitor	Score	Home	OT	Decision	Attendance	Record	Pts	Recap
1	October 1	Buffalo	3–6	Columbus		Greaves	18,207	1–0–0	2
2	October 3	Utah	4–1	Columbus		Greaves	17,176	1–1–0	2
3	October 9	Pittsburgh	2–3	Columbus	SO	Talbot	17,057	2–1–0	4
4	October 10	Columbus	3–5	St. Louis		Greaves	18,096	2–2–0	4
5	October 13	Florida	7–3	Columbus		Talbot	13,538	2–3–0	4
6	October 17	NY Rangers	0–1	Columbus	OT	Greaves	16,021	3–3–0	6
7	October 18	Columbus	1–2	Minnesota		Talbot	18,012	3–4–0	6
8	October 20	Toronto	6–2	Columbus		Greaves	15,073	3–5–0	6
9	October 24	Vegas	1–2	Columbus	OT	Talbot	16,451	4–5–0	8
10	October 27	Columbus	4–3	Philadelphia	OT	Talbot	18,469	5–5–0	10
11	October 29	Columbus	2–3	Carolina		Greaves	18,800	5–6–0	10
12	October 31	Columbus	1–3	Dallas		Greaves	18,532	5–7–0	10

November: 4–5–0 (home: 2–3–0; road: 2–2–0)
#	Date	Visitor	Score	Home	OT	Decision	Attendance	Record	Pts	Recap
13	November 3	Colorado	2–7	Columbus		Talbot	14,959	6–7–0	12
14	November 5	Dallas	1–2	Columbus	SO	Talbot	15,020	7–7–0	14
15	November 6	Columbus	2–5	Buffalo		Greaves	19,070	7–8–0	14
16	November 10	Florida	4–1	Columbus		Talbot	14,134	7–9–0	14
17	November 12	Tampa Bay	3–1	Columbus		Greaves	15,101	7–10–0	14
18	November 14	Philadelphia	4–3	Columbus		Greaves	15,819	7–11–0	14
19	November 17	Columbus	1–5	NY Islanders		Talbot	14,295	7–12–0	14
20	November 19	Columbus	4-2	Chicago				8-12-0	16
21	November 21	Columbus	4-3	Toronto				9-12-0	18
23	November 25	New Jersey	–	Columbus
24	November 27	Detroit	–	Columbus
25	November 30	Columbus	–	Pittsburgh

December: 0–0–0 (home: 0–0–0; road: 0–0–0)
#	Date	Visitor	Score	Home	OT	Decision	Attendance	Record	Pts	Recap
26	December 3	Columbus	–	Carolina
27	December 5	Columbus	–	Nashville
28	December 7	Columbus	–	Tampa Bay
29	December 10	Minnesota	–	Columbus
30	December 12	Montreal	–	Columbus
31	December 13	Columbus	–	NY Rangers
32	December 15	Carolina	–	Columbus
33	December 17	Seattle	–	Columbus
34	December 19	Los Angeles	–	Columbus
35	December 21	Columbus	–	Philadelphia
36	December 22	Montreal	–	Columbus
37	December 26	Columbus	–	Washington
38	December 27	Edmonton	–	Columbus
39	December 29	Columbus	–	Montreal
40	December 31	Washington	–	Columbus

January: 0–0–0 (home: 0–0–0; road: 0–0–0)
#	Date	Visitor	Score	Home	OT	Decision	Attendance	Record	Pts	Recap
41	January 2	Boston	–	Columbus
42	January 3	Columbus	–	NY Rangers
43	January 5	NY Rangers	–	Columbus
44	January 7	Columbus	–	New Jersey
45	January 8	Buffalo	–	Columbus
46	January 12	Columbus	–	Calgary
47	January 15	Columbus	–	Edmonton
48	January 16	Columbus	–	Vancouver
49	January 18	Columbus	–	Seattle
50	January 21	Calgary	–	Columbus
51	January 23	Columbus	–	Ottawa
52	January 24	Anaheim	–	Columbus
53	January 26	Columbus	–	Boston
54	January 28	Winnipeg	–	Columbus
55	January 30	Detroit	–	Columbus

February: 0–0–0 (home: 0–0–0; road: 0–0–0)
#	Date	Visitor	Score	Home	OT	Decision	Attendance	Record	Pts	Recap
56	February 8	Columbus	–	Toronto
57	February 9	Columbus	–	Ottawa
58	February 11	Ottawa	–	Columbus
59	February 13	Columbus	–	Boston
60	February 15	Columbus	–	Colorado
61	February 17	Columbus	–	Utah
62	February 18	Columbus	–	Vegas
63	February 20	Nashville	–	Columbus
64	February 22	NY Islanders	–	Columbus
65	February 26	New Jersey	–	Columbus
66	February 27	NY Islanders	–	Columbus

March: 0–0–0 (home: 0–0–0; road: 0–0–0)
#	Date	Visitor	Score	Home	OT	Decision	Attendance	Record	Pts	Recap
67	March 1	Carolina	–	Columbus
68	March 3	Columbus	–	San Jose
69	March 5	Columbus	–	Los Angeles
70	March 7	Columbus	–	Anaheim
71	March 11	Vancouver	–	Columbus
72	March 13	San Jose	–	Columbus
73	March 16	Pittsburgh	–	Columbus
74	March 18	Columbus	–	Detroit
75	March 20	Columbus	–	Winnipeg
76	March 22	Columbus	–	Pittsburgh
77	March 25	Chicago	–	Columbus
78	March 27	St. Louis	–	Columbus
79	March 30	Columbus	–	Florida

April: 0–0–0 (home: 0–0–0; road: 0–0–0)
#	Date	Visitor	Score	Home	OT	Decision	Attendance	Record	Pts	Recap
80	April 1	Columbus	–	Tampa Bay
81	April 3	Columbus	–	Washington
82	April 6	Washington	–	Columbus
83	April 8	Philadelphia	–	Columbus
84	April 10	Columbus	–	NY Islanders

Legend: Win (2 points) Loss (0 points) Overtime/shootout loss (1 point)

== Roster ==
Updated November 19, 2026

No.	Nat	Player	Pos	S/G	Age	Acquired	Birthplace
2	(Canada)	Jake Christiansen	D	L	27	2020	West Vancouver, British Columbia
3	(United States)	Charlie Coyle (A)	C	R	34	2025	Weymouth, Massachusetts
93	(Canada)	Luca Del Bel Belluz	C	L	23	2022	Woodbridge, Ontario
15	(Canada)	Dante Fabbro	D	R	28	2024	Coquitlam, British Columbia
19	(Canada)	Adam Fantilli	C	L	22	2023	Nobleton, Ontario
83	(United States)	Conor Garland	RW	R	30	2026	Scituate, Massachusetts
73	(Canada)	Jet Greaves	G	L	25	2022	Cambridge, Ontario
44	(Canada)	Erik Gudbranson	D	R	34	2022	Ottawa, Ontario
91	(Canada)	Kent Johnson	C	L	24	2021	Port Moody, British Columbia
89	(United States)	Matthew Knies	LW	L	24	2026	Phoenix, Arizona
94	(Canada)	Ryan Lomberg	LW	L	31	2026	Richmond Hill, Ontario
18	(Canada)	Steven Lorentz	C	L	30	2026	Kitchener, Ontario
21	(Sweden)	Isac Lundeström	C	L	27	2025	Gällivare, Sweden
5	(Canada)	Denton Mateychuk	D	L	22	2022	Dominion City, Manitoba
23	(Canada)	Sean Monahan (A)	C	L	32	2024	Brampton, Ontario
43	(Russia)	Valeri Nichushkin	RW	L	31	2026	Chelyabinsk, Russia
24	(United States)	Mathieu Olivier (A)	RW	R	29	2022	Biloxi, Mississippi
9	(Russia)	Ivan Provorov	D	L	29	2023	Yaroslavl, Russia
78	(Canada)	Damon Severson	D	R	32	2023	Brandon, Manitoba
4	(Canada)	Cole Sillinger (A)	C	L	23	2021	Columbus, Ohio
33	(Canada)	Cam Talbot	G	L	39	2026	Caledonia, Ontario
10	(Russia)	Dmitri Voronkov	C	L	26	2019	Angarsk, Russia
8	(United States)	Zach Werenski (A)	D	L	29	2015	Grosse Pointe, Michigan
29	(United States)	Jack Williams	RW	R	24	2025	Biddeford, Maine

== Player statistics ==
=== Skaters ===
Regular season
Player	GP	G	A	Pts	+/−	PIM

=== Goaltenders ===
Regular season
Player	GP	GS	TOI	W	L	OT	GA	GAA	SA	SV%	SO	G	A	PIM

^{†}Denotes player spent time with another team before joining the Blue Jackets. Stats reflect time with the Blue Jackets only.
^{‡}Denotes player was traded mid-season. Stats reflect time with the Blue Jackets only.
Bold/italics denotes franchise record.

== Transactions ==
=== Trades ===
Date	Details		Ref
June 25, 2026	To Colorado Avalanche STL 2nd-round pick in 2026 (#43 overall); 3rd-round pick in 2027; 5th-round pick in 2028	To Columbus Blue Jackets Valeri Nichushkin	
June 25, 2026	To Montreal Canadiens Hunter McKown	To Columbus Blue Jackets Luke Tuch	
June 27, 2026	To Washington Capitals TOR 4th-round pick in 2026 (#101 overall)	To Columbus Blue Jackets 4th-round pick in 2026 (#112 overall); SJS 5th-round pick in 2028	
June 27, 2026	To Minnesota Wild WSH 4th-round pick in 2026 (#112 overall)	To Columbus Blue Jackets 4th-round pick in 2026 (#121 overall); 6th-round pick in 2026 (#185 overall)	

=== Players acquired ===
Date	Player	New team	Term	Via	Ref
July 1, 2026	Ryan Lomberg	Calgary Flames	2-year	Free agency	
July 1, 2026	Pheonix Copley	Los Angeles Kings	1-year	Free agency	
July 1, 2026	Riley Bezeau	Cleveland Monsters (AHL)	1-year	Free agency	
July 6, 2026	Colton White	New Jersey Devils	2-year	Free agency	

=== Players lost ===
Date	Player	New team	Term	Via	Ref
July 1, 2026	Mason Marchment	San Jose Sharks	5-year	Free agency	
July 1, 2026	Brendan Gaunce	Boston Bruins	2-year	Free agency	
July 1, 2026	Zach Aston-Reese	Philadelphia Flyers	2-year	Free agency	
July 1, 2026	Boone Jenner	Washington Capitals	4-year	Free agency	
July 4, 2026	Zach Sawchenko	Carolina Hurricanes	1-year	Free agency	

=== Signings ===
Date	Player	Term	Ref
July 1, 2026	Owen Sillinger	1-year	
July 2, 2026	Erik Gudbranson	1-year	
July 8, 2026	Sergei Ivanov	2-year	
July 15, 2026	Luke Tuch	2-year	
July 22, 2026	Danton Heinen	1-year	
July 23, 2026	Jet Greaves	3-year	
July 25, 2026	Cole Sillinger	3-year	
September 24, 2026	Adam Fantilli	6-year	

== Draft picks ==
Below are the Columbus Blue Jackets' selections at the 2026 NHL entry draft, which was held on June 26 and 27, 2026, at KeyBank Center in Buffalo, New York.

Round	#	Player	Pos.	Nationality	Team (League)
1	14	Oscar Hemming	LW	Finland	Boston College Eagles (ECAC)
3	94 (Note: The Colorado Avalanche's third-round pick went to the Blue Jackets as the result of a trade on November 30, 2024, that sent David Jiricek and a fifth-round pick in 2025 to the Minnesota Wild in exchange for Daemon Hunt, a conditional first-round pick in 2025, Toronto's fourth-round pick in 2026, a second-round pick in 2027 and this pick.)	Alessandro Di Iorio	C	Canada	Sarnia Sting (OHL)
4	121 (Note: The Minnesota Wild's fourth-round pick went to the Blue Jackets as the result of a trade on June 27, 2026, that sent Washington's fourth-round pick in 2026 (112th overall) to Minnesota in exchange for a sixth-round pick in 2026 (185th overall) and this pick.)	Evan Jardine	LW	United States	Youngstown Phantoms (USHL)
5	142	Parker Snell	G	Canada	Edmonton Oil Kings (WHL)
6	182 (Note: The Pittsburgh Penguins' sixth-round pick went to the Blue Jackets as the result of a trade on February 22, 2024, that sent Emil Bemstrom to Pittsburgh in exchange for Alexander Nylander and this conditional pick. The condition was converted at the end of the Penguins' 2023–24 season.)	Anttoni Uronen	C	Finland	HIFK Hockey (Liiga)
6	185 (Note: The Minnesota Wild's sixth-round pick went to the Blue Jackets as the result of the June 27, 2026 trade that sent Washington's fourth-round pick in 2026 (112th overall) to Minnesota in exchange for a fourth-round pick in 2026 (121st overall) and this pick.)	Jonas Woo	D	Canada	Medicine Hat Tigers (WHL)
7	206	Filip Novak	LW	Czech Republic	HC Sparta Praha (Czech Extraliga)
