= 2026–27 Utah Mammoth season =

National Hockey League season

2026–27 Utah Mammoth
- Division: Central
- Conference: Western
- 2026–27 record: 11–9–3
- Home record: 5–3–2
- Road record: 6–6–1
- Goals for: 77
- Goals against: 79

Team information
- General manager: Bill Armstrong
- Coach: André Tourigny
- Captain: Clayton Keller
- Alternate captains: Lawson Crouse; Mikhail Sergachev
- Arena: Delta Center
- Minor league affiliate: Tucson Roadrunners (AHL)

Team leaders
- Goals: Logan Cooley (11)
- Assists: Clayton Keller (24)
- Points: Clayton Keller (29)
- Penalty minutes: Jack McBain; MacKenzie Weegar (30)
- Plus/minus: Barrett Hayton (+7)
- Wins: Karel Vejmelka (6)
- Goals against average: Karel Vejmelka (3.14)

The 2026–27 Utah Mammoth season is the third season for the National Hockey League (NHL) franchise and their second season under the Mammoth moniker after they played under the Hockey Club name. They play their home games at the Delta Center, that is shared with the Utah Jazz of the National Basketball Association (NBA).

== Standings ==
=== Divisional standings ===
Central Division
| Pos | Team | GP | W | L | OTL | RW | GF | GA | GD | Pts |
|---|---|---|---|---|---|---|---|---|---|---|
| 1 | Minnesota Wild | 23 | 16 | 3 | 4 | 15 | 83 | 51 | +32 | 36 |
| 2 | Dallas Stars | 21 | 13 | 6 | 2 | 8 | 60 | 53 | +7 | 28 |
| 3 | Colorado Avalanche | 22 | 12 | 7 | 3 | 12 | 86 | 68 | +18 | 27 |
| 4 | Nashville Predators | 22 | 11 | 6 | 5 | 8 | 67 | 66 | +1 | 27 |
| 5 | Utah Mammoth | 23 | 11 | 9 | 3 | 9 | 77 | 79 | −2 | 25 |
| 6 | Winnipeg Jets | 22 | 10 | 9 | 3 | 8 | 67 | 74 | −7 | 23 |
| 7 | St. Louis Blues | 21 | 10 | 9 | 2 | 8 | 63 | 65 | −2 | 22 |
| 8 | Chicago Blackhawks | 21 | 6 | 13 | 2 | 4 | 52 | 86 | −34 | 14 |

Updated to game(s) played on November 18, 2026. Source: National Hockey League
Rules for classification: 1) Fewer number of games played (GP, only during regular season); 2) Greater number of regulation wins (RW); 3) Greater number of wins in regulation and overtime, excluding shootout wins (ROW); 4) Greater number of total wins, including shootouts (W); 5) Greater number of points earned in head-to-head play; if teams played an uneven number of head-to-head games, the result of the first game on the home ice of the team with the extra home game is discarded; 6) Greater goal differential (GD); 7) Greater number of goals scored (GF)

=== Conference standings ===
Western Conference Wild Card
| Pos | Div | Team | GP | W | L | OTL | RW | GF | GA | GD | Pts |
|---|---|---|---|---|---|---|---|---|---|---|---|
| 1 | CE | Nashville Predators | 22 | 11 | 6 | 5 | 8 | 67 | 66 | +1 | 27 |
| 2 | CE | Utah Mammoth | 23 | 11 | 9 | 3 | 9 | 77 | 79 | −2 | 25 |
| 3 | CE | Winnipeg Jets | 22 | 10 | 9 | 3 | 8 | 67 | 74 | −7 | 23 |
| 4 | CE | St. Louis Blues | 21 | 10 | 9 | 2 | 9 | 63 | 65 | −2 | 22 |
| 5 | PA | San Jose Sharks | 24 | 10 | 12 | 2 | 3 | 65 | 86 | −21 | 22 |
| 6 | PA | Calgary Flames | 22 | 10 | 11 | 1 | 9 | 56 | 76 | −20 | 21 |
| 7 | PA | Seattle Kraken | 18 | 9 | 8 | 1 | 6 | 59 | 66 | −7 | 19 |
| 8 | PA | Los Angeles Kings | 19 | 6 | 11 | 2 | 4 | 52 | 63 | −11 | 14 |
| 9 | CE | Chicago Blackhawks | 21 | 6 | 13 | 2 | 4 | 52 | 86 | −34 | 14 |
| 10 | PA | Vancouver Canucks | 23 | 5 | 17 | 1 | 3 | 66 | 100 | −34 | 11 |

Updated to game(s) played on November 18, 2026. Source: National Hockey League
Rules for classification: 1) Fewer number of games played (GP, only during regular season); 2) Greater number of regulation wins (RW); 3) Greater number of wins in regulation and overtime, excluding shootout wins (ROW); 4) Greater number of total wins, including shootouts (W); 5) Greater number of points earned in head-to-head play; if teams played an uneven number of head-to-head games, the result of the first game on the home ice of the team with the extra home game is discarded; 6) Greater goal differential (GD); 7) Greater number of goals scored (GF)

== Schedule and results ==
=== Preseason ===
The team's preseason schedule was released on June 22, 2026.

2026 preseason game log: 2–1–1 (Home: 1–0–0; Road: 1–1–1)

| # | Date | Visitor | Score | Home | OT | Decision | Location | Attendance | Record |
|---|---|---|---|---|---|---|---|---|---|
| 1 | September 20 | Utah | 1–4 | Colorado | | Hrabal | Ball Arena | 14,403 | 0–1–0 |
| 2 | September 22 | Utah | 6–3 | Los Angeles | | Vejmelka | Crypto.com Arena | 10,191 | 1–1–0 |
| 3 | September 24 | Utah | 4–5 | Vegas | OT | Cossa | T-Mobile Arena | 14,809 | 1–1–1 |
| 4 | September 26 | Colorado | 0–2 | Utah | | Vejmelka | Delta Center | 14,111 | 2–1–1 |

Legend: Win Loss OT/SO Loss

=== Regular season ===
The Mammoth's regular season schedule was released on July 16, 2026.

2026–27 game log
October: 9–5–0 (Home: 4–2–0; Road: 5–3–0)

| # | Date | Visitor | Score | Home | OT | Decision | Location | Attendance | Record | Points | Recap |
|---|---|---|---|---|---|---|---|---|---|---|---|
| 1 | October 1 | Chicago | 0–6 | Utah | | Vejmelka | Delta Center | 14,111 | 1–0–0 | 2 | |
| 2 | October 3 | Utah | 4–1 | Columbus | | Cossa | Nationwide Arena | 17,176 | 2–0–0 | 4 | |
| 3 | October 4 | Utah | 2–4 | NY Rangers | | Vejmelka | Madison Square Garden | 17,377 | 2–1–0 | 4 | |
| 4 | October 6 | Utah | 5–3 | New Jersey | | Vejmelka | Prudential Center | 15,146 | 3–1–0 | 6 | |
| 5 | October 8 | Utah | 1–6 | Boston | | Cossa | TD Garden | 17,850 | 3–2–0 | 6 | |
| 6 | October 10 | Utah | 4–1 | Buffalo | | Vejmelka | KeyBank Center | 19,070 | 4–2–0 | 8 | |
| 7 | October 13 | Toronto | 4–5 | Utah | | Vejmelka | Delta Center | 14,111 | 5–2–0 | 10 | |
| 8 | October 15 | Utah | 4–2 | Edmonton | | Vejmelka | Rogers Place | 16,176 | 6–2–0 | 12 | |
| 9 | October 17 | Edmonton | 6–2 | Utah | | Vejmelka | Delta Center | 14,111 | 6–3–0 | 12 | |
| 10 | October 19 | Pittsburgh | 4–5 | Utah | | Cossa | Delta Center | 14,111 | 7–3–0 | 14 | |
| 11 | October 22 | Utah | 3–5 | Seattle | | Vejmelka | Climate Pledge Arena | 17,151 | 7–4–0 | 14 | |
| 12 | October 24 | Tampa Bay | 4–5 | Utah | OT | Vejmelka | Delta Center | 14,111 | 8–4–0 | 16 | |
| 13 | October 27 | Minnesota | 3–1 | Utah | | Vejmelka | Delta Center | 14,111 | 8–5–0 | 16 | |
| 14 | October 29 | Utah | 4–3 | Pittsburgh | OT | Cossa | PPG Paints Arena | 15,383 | 9–5–0 | 18 | |

November: 2–4–3 (Home: 1–1–2; Road: 1–3–1)

| # | Date | Visitor | Score | Home | OT | Decision | Location | Attendance | Record | Points | Recap |
|---|---|---|---|---|---|---|---|---|---|---|---|
| 15 | November 1 | Utah | 3–6 | Philadelphia | | Vejmelka | Xfinity Mobile Arena | 18,378 | 9–6–0 | 18 | |
| 16 | November 3 | Utah | 3–2 | Toronto | | Cossa | Scotiabank Arena | 18,889 | 10–6–0 | 20 | |
| 17 | November 5 | Utah | 4–5 | Montreal | OT | Cossa | Bell Centre | 20,962 | 10–6–1 | 21 | |
| 18 | November 7 | Utah | 2–4 | Ottawa | | Vejmelka | Canadian Tire Centre | 17,054 | 10–7–1 | 21 | |
| 19 | November 11 | Utah | 3–5 | Vegas | | Cossa | T-Mobile Arena | 17,186 | 10–8–1 | 21 | |
| 20 | November 12 | St. Louis | 1–0 | Utah | SO | Vejmelka | Delta Center | 14,111 | 10–8–2 | 22 | |
| 21 | November 14 | San Jose | 6–5 | Utah | SO | Vejmelka | Delta Center | 14,111 | 10–8–3 | 23 | |
| 22 | November 16 | Vancouver | 3–2 | Utah | | Vejmelka | Delta Center | 14,111 | 10–9–3 | 23 | |
| 23 | November 18 | Colorado | 1–4 | Utah | | Cossa | Delta Center | 14,111 | 11–9–3 | 25 | |
| 24 | November 21 | Anaheim | – | Utah | | | Delta Center | | | | |
| 25 | November 23 | Utah | – | Winnipeg | | | Canada Life Centre | | | | |
| 26 | November 25 | Utah | – | Minnesota | | | Grand Casino Arena | | | | |
| 27 | November 27 | Utah | – | Nashville | | | Bridgestone Arena | | | | |
| 28 | November 28 | Utah | – | Dallas | | | American Airlines Center | | | | |
| 29 | November 30 | Montreal | – | Utah | | | Delta Center | | | | |

December: 0–0–0 (Home: 0–0–0; Road: 0–0–0)

| # | Date | Visitor | Score | Home | OT | Decision | Location | Attendance | Record | Points | Recap |
|---|---|---|---|---|---|---|---|---|---|---|---|
| 30 | December 2 | Winnipeg | – | Utah | | | Delta Center | | | | |
| 31 | December 3 | Utah | – | Vegas | | | T-Mobile Arena | | | | |
| 32 | December 5 | Utah | – | Los Angeles | | | Crypto.com Arena | | | | |
| 33 | December 10 | St. Louis | – | Utah | | | Delta Center | | | | |
| 34 | December 12 | Utah | – | Chicago | | | United Center | | | | |
| 35 | December 14 | Utah | – | Colorado | | | Ball Arena | | | | |
| 36 | December 15 | NY Islanders | – | Utah | | | Delta Center | | | | |
| 37 | December 17 | Carolina | – | Utah | | | Delta Center | | | | |
| 38 | December 19 | Utah | – | Edmonton | | | Rogers Place | | | | |
| 39 | December 21 | Utah | – | Vancouver | | | Rogers Arena | | | | |
| 40 | December 26 | Utah | – | Los Angeles | | | Crypto.com Arena | | | | |
| 41 | December 29 | New Jersey | – | Utah | | | Delta Center | | | | |
| 42 | December 31 | Colorado | – | Utah | | | Rice–Eccles Stadium | (outdoors) | | | |

January: 0–0–0 (Home: 0–0–0; Road: 0–0–0)

| # | Date | Visitor | Score | Home | OT | Decision | Location | Attendance | Record | Points | Recap |
|---|---|---|---|---|---|---|---|---|---|---|---|
| 43 | January 2 | Vancouver | – | Utah | | | Delta Center | | | | |
| 44 | January 5 | Ottawa | – | Utah | | | Delta Center | | | | |
| 45 | January 7 | Utah | – | Detroit | | | Little Caesars Arena | | | | |
| 46 | January 9 | Utah | – | Winnipeg | | | Canada Life Centre | | | | |
| 47 | January 12 | Utah | – | Chicago | | | United Center | | | | |
| 48 | January 13 | Detroit | – | Utah | | | Delta Center | | | | |
| 49 | January 15 | Los Angeles | – | Utah | | | Delta Center | | | | |
| 50 | January 18 | Utah | – | San Jose | | | SAP Center | | | | |
| 51 | January 23 | Boston | – | Utah | | | Delta Center | | | | |
| 52 | January 25 | Minnesota | – | Utah | | | Delta Center | | | | |
| 53 | January 27 | Buffalo | – | Utah | | | Delta Center | | | | |
| 54 | January 29 | Washington | – | Utah | | | Delta Center | | | | |
| 55 | January 31 | Nashville | – | Utah | | | Delta Center | | | | |

February: 0–0–0 (Home: 0–0–0; Road: 0–0–0)

| # | Date | Visitor | Score | Home | OT | Decision | Location | Attendance | Record | Points | Recap |
|---|---|---|---|---|---|---|---|---|---|---|---|
| 56 | February 2 | Nashville | – | Utah | | | Delta Center | | | | |
| 57 | February 3 | Utah | – | Calgary | | | Scotiabank Saddledome | | | | |
| 58 | February 12 | Calgary | – | Utah | | | Delta Center | | | | |
| 59 | February 14 | Utah | – | Washington | | | Capital One Arena | | | | |
| 60 | February 15 | Utah | – | NY Islanders | | | UBS Arena | | | | |
| 61 | February 17 | Columbus | – | Utah | | | Delta Center | | | | |
| 62 | February 19 | Seattle | – | Utah | | | Delta Center | | | | |
| 63 | February 21 | Utah | – | St. Louis | | | Enterprise Center | | | | |
| 64 | February 24 | Calgary | – | Utah | | | Delta Center | | | | |
| 65 | February 26 | Florida | – | Utah | | | Delta Center | | | | |
| 66 | February 28 | Utah | – | Tampa Bay | | | Benchmark International Arena | | | | |

March: 0–0–0 (Home: 0–0–0; Road: 0–0–0)

| # | Date | Visitor | Score | Home | OT | Decision | Location | Attendance | Record | Points | Recap |
|---|---|---|---|---|---|---|---|---|---|---|---|
| 67 | March 2 | Utah | – | Florida | | | Amerant Bank Arena | | | | |
| 68 | March 4 | Utah | – | Nashville | | | Bridgestone Arena | | | | |
| 69 | March 7 | Utah | – | Carolina | | | Lenovo Center | | | | |
| 70 | March 9 | NY Rangers | – | Utah | | | Delta Center | | | | |
| 71 | March 13 | Philadelphia | – | Utah | | | Delta Center | | | | |
| 72 | March 15 | Dallas | – | Utah | | | Delta Center | | | | |
| 73 | March 18 | Utah | – | Anaheim | | | Honda Center | | | | |
| 74 | March 19 | Chicago | – | Utah | | | Delta Center | | | | |
| 75 | March 21 | Utah | – | Minnesota | | | Grand Casino Arena | | | | |
| 76 | March 23 | Utah | – | Colorado | | | Ball Arena | | | | |
| 77 | March 26 | San Jose | – | Utah | | | Delta Center | | | | |
| 78 | March 30 | Utah | – | Seattle | | | Climate Pledge Arena | | | | |

April: 0–0–0 (Home: 0–0–0; Road: 0–0–0)

| # | Date | Visitor | Score | Home | OT | Decision | Location | Attendance | Record | Points | Recap |
|---|---|---|---|---|---|---|---|---|---|---|---|
| 79 | April 1 | Anaheim | – | Utah | | | Delta Center | | | | |
| 80 | April 3 | Vegas | – | Utah | | | Delta Center | | | | |
| 81 | April 5 | Winnipeg | – | Utah | | | Delta Center | | | | |
| 82 | April 7 | Dallas | – | Utah | | | Delta Center | | | | |
| 83 | April 9 | Utah | – | Dallas | | | American Airlines Center | | | | |
| 84 | April 10 | Utah | – | St. Louis | | | Enterprise Center | | | | |

Win (2 points) Loss (0 points) OT/SO Loss (1 point)

== Roster ==
Updated November 15, 2026

| No. | Nat | Player | Pos | S/G | Age | Acquired | Birthplace |
|---|---|---|---|---|---|---|---|
| 50 | (Russia) | Daniil But | LW | R | 21 | 2024 | Yaroslavl, Russia |
| 53 | (Canada) | Michael Carcone | LW | L | 30 | 2024 | Ajax, Ontario |
| 92 | (United States) | Logan Cooley | C | L | 22 | 2024 | Pittsburgh, Pennsylvania |
| 33 | (Canada) | Sebastian Cossa | G | L | 23 | 2026 | Hamilton, Ontario |
| 67 | (Canada) | Lawson Crouse (A) | LW | L | 29 | 2024 | Mount Brydges, Ontario |
| 57 | (United States) | Nick DeSimone | D | R | 31 | 2025 | East Amherst, New York |
| 84 | (Russia) | Artem Duda | D | L | 22 | 2024 | Moscow, Russia |
| 11 | (Canada) | Dylan Guenther | RW | R | 23 | 2024 | Edmonton, Alberta |
| 27 | (Canada) | Barrett Hayton | C | L | 26 | 2024 | Peterborough, Ontario |
| 15 | (United States) | Zac Jones | D | L | 26 | 2026 | Glen Allen, Virginia |
| 9 | (United States) | Clayton Keller (C) | C | L | 28 | 2024 | Chesterfield, Missouri |
| 10 | (Canada) | Maveric Lamoureux | D | R | 22 | 2024 | Laval, Quebec |
| 72 | (United States) | Anders Lee | LW | L | 36 | 2026 | Edina, Minnesota |
| 6 | (United States) | John Marino | D | R | 29 | 2024 | North Easton, Massachusetts |
| 22 | (Canada) | Jack McBain | C | L | 26 | 2024 | Toronto, Ontario |
| 62 | (Canada) | Ben McCartney | LW | L | 25 | 2024 | Macdonald, Manitoba |
| 38 | (Canada) | Liam O'Brien | LW | L | 32 | 2024 | Halifax, Nova Scotia |
| 20 | (United States) | Andrew Peeke | D | R | 28 | 2026 | Parkland, Florida |
| 8 | (United States) | Nick Schmaltz | C | R | 30 | 2024 | Madison, Wisconsin |
| 88 | (United States) | Nate Schmidt | D | L | 35 | 2025 | St. Cloud, Minnesota |
| 98 | (Russia) | Mikhail Sergachev (A) | D | L | 28 | 2024 | Nizhnekamsk, Russia |
| 26 | (Russia) | Dmitriy Simashev | D | L | 21 | 2024 | Kostroma, Russia |
| 82 | (Sweden) | Kevin Stenlund | C | L | 30 | 2024 | Stockholm, Sweden |
| 16 | (United States) | Vincent Trocheck | C | R | 33 | 2026 | Pittsburgh, Pennsylvania |
| 70 | (Czech Republic) | Karel Vejmelka | G | R | 30 | 2024 | Třebíč, Czech Republic |
| 52 | (Canada) | MacKenzie Weegar | D | R | 32 | 2026 | Ottawa, Ontario |
| 56 | (United States) | Kailer Yamamoto | RW | R | 28 | 2024 | Spokane, Washington |

== Player statistics ==
=== Skaters ===
Regular season
| Player | GP | G | A | Pts | +/− | PIM |

=== Goaltenders ===
Regular season
| Player | GP | GS | TOI | W | L | OT | GA | GAA | SA | SV% | SO | G | A | PIM |

^{†}Denotes player spent time with another team before joining Utah. Stats reflect time with Utah only.
^{‡}Denotes player was traded or waived mid-season. Stats reflect time with Utah only.

== Transactions ==
The Mammoth have been involved in the following transactions during the 2026–27 season.

Key:

† Contract is entry-level.
‡ Contract initially takes effect in the 2026–27 season.

=== Trades ===
| Date | Details | | Ref |
|---|---|---|---|
| July 1, 2026 | To New York Rangers Cole Beaudoin; Sean Durzi conditional (Note: New York will receive the earlier of Toronto's or Utah's third-round picks in 2027.) TOR 3rd-round pick in 2027 or UTA 3rd-round pick in 2027 | To Utah Mammoth Vincent Trocheck | |

=== Players acquired ===
| Date | Player | Former team | Term | Via | Ref |
|---|---|---|---|---|---|
| July 1, 2026 | Vincent Trocheck | New York Rangers | Trade | | |
| July 1, 2026 | Anders Lee | New York Islanders | 3-year | Free agency | |
| July 1, 2026 | Zac Jones | Buffalo Sabres | 2-year, two-way | Free agency | |
| July 3, 2026 | Andrew Peeke | Boston Bruins | 1-year | Free agency | |

=== Players lost ===
| Date | Player | New team | Term | Via | Ref |
|---|---|---|---|---|---|
| July 1, 2026 | Vítek Vaněček | New York Islanders | 1-year | Free agency | |
| July 1, 2026 | Scott Perunovich | Los Angeles Kings | 1-year | Free agency | |
| July 1, 2026 | Alexander Kerfoot | Nashville Predators | 2-year | Free agency | |
| July 4, 2026 | Matt Villalta | Buffalo Sabres | 1-year | Free agency | |

=== Signings ===
| Date | Player | Term | Ref |
|---|---|---|---|
| July 8, 2026 | Barrett Hayton | 1-year | |

== Draft picks ==
Below are the Utah Mammoth selections at the 2026 NHL entry draft, which was held on June 26 and 27, 2026, at the KeyBank Center in Buffalo, New York.

Utah Mammoth 2026 NHL entry draft picks
| Round | # | Player | Pos | Nationality | College/Junior/Club team | League |
|---|---|---|---|---|---|---|
| 1 | 17 (Note: The Los Angeles Kings' first-round pick went to the Utah Mammoth as a result of a trade on June 26, 2026, that sent a first-round pick in 2026 (19th overall) and third-round pick in 2026 (83rd overall) to Los Angeles in exchange for this pick.) | Ethan Belchetz | LW | Canada | Windsor Spitfires | OHL |
| 3 | 96 (Note: The Carolina Hurricanes' third-round pick went to the Utah Mammoth as the result of a trade on March 1, 2023, that sent Shayne Gostisbehere to Carolina in exchange for this pick.) | Adam Valentini | C | Canada | Michigan Wolverines | B1G |
| 4 | 115 | Carl Axelsson | G | Sweden | Muskegon Lumberjacks | USHL |
| 5 | 130 (Note: The Chicago Blackhawks' fifth-round pick went to the Utah Mammoth as the result of a trade on March 7, 2025, that sent Aku Raty, Victor Soderstrom and the contract of Shea Weber to Chicago in exchange for this pick.) | Theodor Knights | D | Sweden | MoDo Hockey U20 | U20 Nationell |
| 5 | 147 | Florent Houle | RW | Canada | Sherbrooke Phoenix | QMJHL |
| 7 | 211 | Artyom Prima | RW | Russia | Omaha Lancers | USHL |
