= 2026–27 Pittsburgh Penguins season =

National Hockey League season

2026–27 Pittsburgh Penguins
- Division: Metropolitan
- Conference: Eastern
- 2026–27 record: 7–10–2
- Home record: 4–3–1
- Road record: 3–7–1
- Goals for: 61
- Goals against: 67

Team information
- General manager: Kyle Dubas
- Coach: Dan Muse
- Captain: Sidney Crosby
- Alternate captains: Kris Letang; Evgeni Malkin
- Arena: PPG Paints Arena
- Minor league affiliates: Wilkes-Barre/Scranton Penguins (AHL); Florida Everblades (ECHL)

Team leaders
- Goals: Tommy Novak; Nicholas Robertson (7)
- Assists: Erik Karlsson (16)
- Points: Erik Karlsson (19)
- Penalty minutes: Sidney Crosby (14)
- Plus/minus: Nicholas Robertson (+6)
- Wins: Artūrs Šilovs (5)
- Goals against average: Sergei Murashov (3.26)

The 2026–27 Pittsburgh Penguins season is the 60th season (59th season of play) for the National Hockey League (NHL) franchise that was established on June 5, 1967.

== Off-season ==
The Pittsburgh Penguins' 2026 offseason has focused on shifting towards a younger roster and traditional rebuild under genreral manager Kyle Dubas.

== Standings ==
=== Divisional standings ===
Metropolitan Division
Pos	Team	GP	W	L	OTL	RW	GF	GA	GD	Pts
1	Carolina Hurricanes	21	16	3	2	15	87	47	+40	34
2	New Jersey Devils	22	15	7	0	10	82	64	+18	30
3	New York Rangers	22	13	8	1	13	67	58	+9	27
4	New York Islanders	20	10	6	4	8	65	57	+8	24
5	Washington Capitals	19	10	9	0	8	64	70	−6	20
6	Philadelphia Flyers	24	7	11	6	7	57	80	−23	20
7	Pittsburgh Penguins	20	7	11	2	3	62	71	−9	16
8	Columbus Blue Jackets	19	7	12	0	2	46	63	−17	14

Updated to game(s) played on November 18, 2026. Source: National Hockey League
Rules for classification: 1) Fewer number of games played (GP, only during regular season); 2) Greater number of regulation wins (RW); 3) Greater number of wins in regulation and overtime, excluding shootout wins (ROW); 4) Greater number of total wins, including shootouts (W); 5) Greater number of points earned in head-to-head play; if teams played an uneven number of head-to-head games, the result of the first game on the home ice of the team with the extra home game is discarded; 6) Greater goal differential (GD); 7) Greater number of goals scored (GF)

=== Conference standings ===
Eastern Conference Wild Card
Pos	Div	Team	GP	W	L	OTL	RW	GF	GA	GD	Pts
1	AT	Boston Bruins	22	14	7	1	11	76	56	+20	29
2	AT	Florida Panthers	23	12	8	3	10	72	68	+4	27
3	ME	New York Islanders	20	10	6	4	8	65	57	+8	24
4	ME	Washington Capitals	19	10	9	0	8	64	70	−6	20
5	AT	Buffalo Sabres	21	8	9	4	6	58	74	−16	20
6	ME	Philadelphia Flyers	24	7	11	6	7	57	80	−23	20
7	AT	Detroit Red Wings	22	8	11	3	6	58	68	−10	19
8	AT	Toronto Maple Leafs	23	8	13	2	7	72	82	−10	18
9	ME	Pittsburgh Penguins	20	7	11	2	3	62	71	−9	16
10	ME	Columbus Blue Jackets	19	7	12	0	2	46	63	−17	14

Updated to game(s) played on November 18, 2026. Source: National Hockey League
Rules for classification: 1) Fewer number of games played (GP, only during regular season); 2) Greater number of regulation wins (RW); 3) Greater number of wins in regulation and overtime, excluding shootout wins (ROW); 4) Greater number of total wins, including shootouts (W); 5) Greater number of points earned in head-to-head play; if teams played an uneven number of head-to-head games, the result of the first game on the home ice of the team with the extra home game is discarded; 6) Greater goal differential (GD); 7) Greater number of goals scored (GF)

== Schedule and results ==
=== Preseason ===
2026 preseason game log
September: 2–2–0 (home: 1–1–0; road: 1–1–0)

#	Date	Visitor	Score	Home	OT	Location	Attendance	Record
1	September 21	Buffalo	1–4	Pittsburgh		PPG Paints Arena	11,947	1–0–0
2	September 22	Detroit	7–4	Pittsburgh		PPG Paints Arena	11,768	1–1–0
3	September 24	Pittsburgh	0–4	Columbus		Nationwide Arena	14,056	1–2–0
4	September 26	Pittsburgh	3–1	Buffalo		KeyBank Center	16,078	2–2–0

Legend

Win Loss OT/SO Loss

=== Regular season ===
The regular season schedule was released on July 16, 2026.

2026–27 game log
September: 1–0–0 (home: 0–0–0; road: 1–0–0)

#	Date	Visitor	Score	Home	OT	Arena	Decision	Attendance	Record	Points	Recap
1	September 30	Pittsburgh	7–0	Philadelphia		Xfinity Mobile Arena	Šilovs (1–0–0)	19,902	1–0–0	2	

October: 4–7–2 (home: 4–1–1; road: 0–6–1)

#	Date	Visitor	Score	Home	OT	Arena	Decision	Attendance	Record	Points	Recap
2	October 3	Montreal	5–6	Pittsburgh	OT	PPG Paints Arena	Šilovs (2–0–0)	18,382	2–0–0	4	
3	October 5	Winnipeg	3–2	Pittsburgh		PPG Paints Arena	Murashov (0–1–0)	17,767	2–1–0	4	
4	October 7	Pittsburgh	3–5	Washington		Capital One Arena	Šilovs (2–1–0)	18,347	2–2–0	4	
5	October 9	Pittsburgh	2–3	Columbus	SO	Nationwide Arena	Murashov (0–1–1)	17,057	2–2–1	5	
6	October 10	Dallas	1–2	Pittsburgh	SO	PPG Paints Arena	Šilovs (3–1–0)	18,192	3–2–1	7	
7	October 13	Pittsburgh	3–5	Chicago		United Center	Murashov (0–2–1)	17,609	3–3–1	7	
8	October 16	Pittsburgh	2–5	Colorado		Ball Arena	Šilovs (3–2–0)	18,111	3–4–1	7	
9	October 17	Pittsburgh	2–6	Vegas		T-Mobile Arena	Murashov (0–3–1)	17,437	3–5–1	7	
10	October 19	Pittsburgh	4–5	Utah		Delta Center	Šilovs (3–3–0)	14,111	3–6–1	7	
11	October 22	Florida	0–4	Pittsburgh		PPG Paints Arena	Šilovs (4–3–0)	14,898	4–6–1	9	
12	October 24	Nashville	2–3	Pittsburgh		PPG Paints Arena	Šilovs (5–3–0)	18,191	5–6–1	11	
13	October 29	Utah	4–3	Pittsburgh	OT	PPG Paints Arena	Šilovs (5–3–1)	15,383	5–6–2	12	
14	October 31	Pittsburgh	4–5	Montreal		Bell Centre	Murashov (0–4–1)	20,962	5–7–2	12	

November: 2–3–0 (home: 0–2–0; road: 2–1–0)

#	Date	Visitor	Score	Home	OT	Arena	Decision	Attendance	Record	Points	Recap
15	November 3	Vegas	3–2	Pittsburgh		PPG Paints Arena	Šilovs (5–4–1)	15,740	5–8–2	12	
16	November 5	Boston	6–2	Pittsburgh		PPG Paints Arena	Šilovs (5–5–1)	17,316	5–9–2	12	
17	November 7	Pittsburgh	5–2	Los Angeles		Crypto.com Arena	Murashov (1–4–1)	18,145	6–9–2	14	
18	November 8	Pittsburgh	2–5	Anaheim		Honda Center	Šilovs (5–6–1)	17,174	6–10–2	14	
19	November 11	Pittsburgh	3–2	San Jose	SO	SAP Center	Murashov (2–4–1)	17,435	7–10–2	16	
20	November 14	Ottawa	4–1	Pittsburgh		PPG Paints Arena	Murashov (2–5–1)	18,363	7–11–2	16	
21	November 19	St. Louis	5–2	Pittsburgh		PPG Paints Arena	Šilovs (5–7–1)	15,396	7–12–2	16	
22	November 21	Pittsburgh	–	Nashville		Bridgestone Arena					
23	November 22	Pittsburgh	–	Dallas		American Airlines Center					
24	November 25	Calgary	–	Pittsburgh		PPG Paints Arena					
25	November 27	Pittsburgh	–	Buffalo		KeyBank Center					
26	November 28	Toronto	–	Pittsburgh		PPG Paints Arena					
27	November 30	Columbus	–	Pittsburgh		PPG Paints Arena					

December: 0–0–0 (home: 0–0–0; road: 0–0–0)

#	Date	Visitor	Score	Home	OT	Arena	Decision	Attendance	Record	Points	Recap
28	December 2	Pittsburgh	–	St. Louis		Enterprise Center					
29	December 5	New Jersey	–	Pittsburgh		PPG Paints Arena					
30	December 6	San Jose	–	Pittsburgh		PPG Paints Arena					
31	December 8	Chicago	–	Pittsburgh		PPG Paints Arena					
32	December 10	Pittsburgh	–	Florida		Amerant Bank Arena					
33	December 12	Pittsburgh	–	Tampa Bay		Benchmark International Arena					
34	December 15	Tampa Bay	–	Pittsburgh		PPG Paints Arena					
35	December 17	Los Angeles	–	Pittsburgh		PPG Paints Arena					
36	December 18	Seattle	–	Pittsburgh		PPG Paints Arena					
37	December 22	Buffalo	–	Pittsburgh		PPG Paints Arena					
38	December 26	Pittsburgh	–	Carolina		Lenovo Center					
39	December 29	Carolina	–	Pittsburgh		PPG Paints Arena					
40	December 31	Pittsburgh	–	Ottawa		Canadian Tire Centre					

January: 0–0–0 (home: 0–0–0; road: 0–0–0)

#	Date	Visitor	Score	Home	OT	Arena	Decision	Attendance	Record	Points	Recap
41	January 1	Minnesota	–	Pittsburgh		PPG Paints Arena					
42	January 3	Edmonton	–	Pittsburgh		PPG Paints Arena					
43	January 7	Pittsburgh	–	Carolina		Lenovo Center					
44	January 9	Pittsburgh	–	Montreal		Bell Centre					
45	January 12	Colorado	–	Pittsburgh		PPG Paints Arena					
46	January 13	Pittsburgh	–	NY Islanders		UBS Arena					
47	January 16	Pittsburgh	–	Toronto		Scotiabank Arena					
48	January 18	Washington	–	Pittsburgh		PPG Paints Arena					
49	January 21	Anaheim	–	Pittsburgh		PPG Paints Arena					
50	January 23	Vancouver	–	Pittsburgh		PPG Paints Arena					
51	January 25	Pittsburgh	–	Detroit		Little Caesars Arena					
52	January 26	NY Islanders	–	Pittsburgh		PPG Paints Arena					
53	January 29	NY Rangers	–	Pittsburgh		PPG Paints Arena					
54	January 31	Philadelphia	–	Pittsburgh		PPG Paints Arena					

February: 0–0–0 (home: 0–0–0; road: 0–0–0)

#	Date	Visitor	Score	Home	OT	Arena	Decision	Attendance	Record	Points	Recap
55	February 2	Tampa Bay	–	Pittsburgh		PPG Paints Arena					
56	February 13	Pittsburgh	–	Edmonton		Rogers Place					
57	February 15	Pittsburgh	–	Seattle		Climate Pledge Arena					
58	February 16	Pittsburgh	–	Vancouver		Rogers Arena					
59	February 19	Pittsburgh	–	Calgary		Scotiabank Saddledome					
60	February 21	Pittsburgh	–	Winnipeg		Canada Life Centre					
61	February 23	Pittsburgh	–	Minnesota		Grand Casino Arena					
62	February 25	Toronto	–	Pittsburgh		PPG Paints Arena					
63	February 28	NY Rangers	–	Pittsburgh		PPG Paints Arena					

March: 0–0–0 (home: 0–0–0; road: 0–0–0)

#	Date	Visitor	Score	Home	OT	Arena	Decision	Attendance	Record	Points	Recap
64	March 2	Pittsburgh	–	Buffalo		KeyBank Center					
65	March 4	Pittsburgh	–	Florida		Amerant Bank Arena					
66	March 6	Pittsburgh	–	Boston		TD Garden					
67	March 7	Pittsburgh	–	NY Islanders		UBS Arena					
68	March 9	Ottawa	–	Pittsburgh		PPG Paints Arena					
69	March 11	Boston	–	Pittsburgh		PPG Paints Arena					
70	March 13	Washington	–	Pittsburgh		PPG Paints Arena					
71	March 14	Detroit	–	Pittsburgh		PPG Paints Arena					
72	March 16	Pittsburgh	–	Columbus		Nationwide Arena					
73	March 18	Pittsburgh	–	New Jersey		Prudential Center					
74	March 20	Pittsburgh	–	NY Rangers		Madison Square Garden					
75	March 22	Columbus	–	Pittsburgh		PPG Paints Arena					
76	March 25	New Jersey	–	Pittsburgh		PPG Paints Arena					
77	March 27	Carolina	–	Pittsburgh		PPG Paints Arena					
78	March 30	Pittsburgh	–	Philadelphia		Xfinity Mobile Arena					

April: 0–0–0 (home: 0–0–0; road: 0–0–0)

#	Date	Visitor	Score	Home	OT	Arena	Decision	Attendance	Record	Points	Recap
79	April 1	NY Islanders	–	Pittsburgh		PPG Paints Arena					
80	April 3	Philadelphia	–	Pittsburgh		PPG Paints Arena					
81	April 4	Pittsburgh	–	Washington		Capital One Arena					
82	April 6	Pittsburgh	–	NY Rangers		Madison Square Garden					
83	April 9	Pittsburgh	–	Detroit		Little Caesars Arena					
84	April 10	Pittsburgh	–	New Jersey		Prudential Center					

Legend: Win (2 points) Loss (0 points) Overtime/shootout loss (1 point)

== Roster ==
Updated November 1, 2026

No.	Nat	Player	Pos	S/G	Age	Acquired	Birthplace
16	(Canada)	Justin Brazeau	RW	R	28	2025	New Liskeard, Ontario
72	(United States)	Declan Carlile	D	L	26	2026	Flint, Michigan
59	(Russia)	Egor Chinakhov	RW	L	25	2025	Omsk, Russia
87	(Canada)	Sidney Crosby (C)	C	L	39	2005	Cole Harbour, Nova Scotia
19	(Canada)	Connor Dewar	LW/C	L	27	2025	The Pas, Manitoba
49	(Canada)	Sam Girard	D	L	28	2026	Roberval, Quebec
27	(Canada)	Ryan Graves	D	L	31	2023	Yarmouth, Nova Scotia
65	(Sweden)	Erik Karlsson	D	R	36	2023	Landsbro, Sweden
81	(Canada)	Ben Kindel	C	R	19	2025	Coquitlam, British Columbia
41	(Finland)	Ville Koivunen	RW	L	23	2024	Oulu, Finland
6	(Canada)	Kaedan Korczak	D	R	25	2026	Yorkton, Saskatchewan
62	(Russia)	Andrei Kuzmenko	RW	R	30	2026	Yakutsk, Russia
22	(Canada)	Hendrix Lapierre	C	L	24	2026	Gatineau, Quebec
58	(Canada)	Kris Letang (A)	D	R	39	2005	Montreal, Quebec
46	(United States)	Blake Lizotte	C	L	28	2024	Lindstrom, Minnesota
71	(Russia)	Evgeni Malkin (A)	C/LW	L	40	2004	Magnitogorsk, Soviet Union
1	(Russia)	Sergei Murashov	G	R	22	2022	Yaroslavl, Russia
18	(United States)	Tommy Novak	C/LW	L	29	2025	River Falls, Wisconsin
67	(Sweden)	Rickard Rakell	RW/C	R	33	2022	Sundbyberg, Sweden
14	(United States)	Nick Robertson	LW	L	25	2026	Arcadia, California
17	(United States)	Bryan Rust	RW	R	34	2010	Pontiac, Michigan
37	(Latvia)	Artūrs Šilovs	G	L	25	2025	Riga, Latvia
25	(Sweden)	Elmer Söderblom	LW	L	25	2026	Gothenburg, Sweden
7	(Belarus)	Ilya Solovyov	D	L	26	2026	Mogilev, Belarus
24	(United States)	Spencer Stastney	D	L	26	2026	Mequon, Wisconsin
57	(United States)	Trevor van Riemsdyk	D	R	35	2026	Middletown, New Jersey

== Transactions ==
=== Trades ===
Date	Details	
June 30, 2026	To Vegas Golden Knights Parker Wotherspoon	To Pittsburgh Penguins Kaedan Korczak
July 1, 2026	To Toronto Maple Leafs 2028 4th-round pick	To Pittsburgh Penguins Nicholas Robertson
August 19, 2026	To Anaheim Ducks Cruz Lucius	To Pittsburgh Penguins Future considerations
October 7, 2026	To Edmonton Oilers Filip Hållander	To Pittsburgh Penguins Spencer Stastney
October 7, 2026	To Buffalo Sabres Caleb Jones; Daniel Laatsch	To Pittsburgh Penguins Ryan Johnson

=== Players acquired ===
Date	Player	Former team	Term	Via
July 1, 2026	Trevor van Riemsdyk	Washington Capitals	2 years	Free agency
July 1, 2026	Declan Carlile	Tampa Bay Lightning	2 years	Free agency
July 1, 2026	Andrei Kuzmenko	Los Angeles Kings	1 year	Free agency
July 1, 2026	Atley Calvert	Wilkes-Barre/Scranton Penguins	2 years	Entry-level contract

=== Players lost ===
Date	Player	New team	Term	Via
July 1, 2026	Stuart Skinner	Winnipeg Jets	2 years	Free agency
July 1, 2026	Noel Acciari	Philadelphia Flyers	2 years	Free agency
July 1, 2026	Connor Clifton	Boston Bruins	2 years	Free agency
July 1, 2026	Ryan Shea	Edmonton Oilers	5 years	Free agency
July 1, 2026	Boko Imama	Florida Panthers	1 year	Free agency
July 15, 2026	Anthony Mantha	New Jersey Devils	2 years	Free agency

=== Signings ===
Date	Player	Term

Key:

- ^{A} – Entry Level Contract
- ^{B} – Professional Tryout Contract
- ^{C} – Begins next season

== Draft picks ==
Below are the Pittsburgh Penguins's selections at the 2026 NHL entry draft, which was held on June 26 and June 27, 2026, and it took place at KeyBank Center in Buffalo, New York.

Round	#	Player	Pos	Nationality	College/Junior/Club team (League)
1	22	Liam Ruck	RW	Canada	Medicine Hat Tigers (WHL)
2	39	Markus Ruck	C	Canada	Medicine Hat Tigers (WHL)
2	54	Tomas Galvas	D	Czech Republic	HC Bílí Tygři Liberec (Czech)
3	86	Pierce Mbuyi	LW	Canada	Owen Sound Attack (OHL)
4	111	Parker Von Richter	D	Canada	Barrie Colts (OHL)
5	160	Matvei Nikonovich	G	Belarus	HC Lada Togliatti (KHL)
