= 2026–27 Boston Bruins season =

National Hockey League team season

2026–27 Boston Bruins
- Division: Atlantic
- Conference: Eastern
- 2026–27 record: 14–7–1
- Home record: 8–4–0
- Road record: 6–3–1
- Goals for: 76
- Goals against: 56

Team information
- General manager: Don Sweeney
- Coach: Marco Sturm
- Captain: David Pastrňák
- Alternate captains: Tanner Jeannot; Hampus Lindholm; Charlie McAvoy
- Arena: TD Garden
- Minor league affiliates: Providence Bruins (AHL); Maine Mariners (ECHL)

Team leaders
- Goals: David Pastrňák (10)
- Assists: David Pastrňák (18)
- Points: David Pastrňák (28)
- Penalty minutes: Nikita Zadorov (80)
- Plus/minus: Will Borgen (+18)
- Wins: Jeremy Swayman (10)
- Goals against average: Michael DiPietro (2.15)

The 2026–27 Boston Bruins season is the 103rd season (102nd season of play) for the National Hockey League (NHL) franchise that was established on November 1, 1924.

== Standings ==
=== Divisional standings ===
Atlantic Division
Pos	Team	GP	W	L	OTL	RW	GF	GA	GD	Pts
1	Tampa Bay Lightning	21	14	5	2	12	79	61	+18	30
2	Ottawa Senators	22	14	6	2	11	70	62	+8	30
3	Montreal Canadiens	22	13	5	4	9	72	66	+6	30
4	Boston Bruins	22	14	7	1	11	76	56	+20	29
5	Florida Panthers	23	12	8	3	10	72	68	+4	27
6	Buffalo Sabres	21	8	9	4	6	58	74	−16	20
7	Detroit Red Wings	22	8	11	3	6	58	68	−10	19
8	Toronto Maple Leafs	23	8	13	2	7	72	82	−10	18

Updated to game(s) played on November 18, 2026. Source: National Hockey League
Rules for classification: 1) Fewer number of games played (GP, only during regular season); 2) Greater number of regulation wins (RW); 3) Greater number of wins in regulation and overtime, excluding shootout wins (ROW); 4) Greater number of total wins, including shootouts (W); 5) Greater number of points earned in head-to-head play; if teams played an uneven number of head-to-head games, the result of the first game on the home ice of the team with the extra home game is discarded; 6) Greater goal differential (GD); 7) Greater number of goals scored (GF)

=== Conference standings ===
Eastern Conference Wild Card
Pos	Div	Team	GP	W	L	OTL	RW	GF	GA	GD	Pts
1	AT	Boston Bruins	22	14	7	1	11	76	56	+20	29
2	AT	Florida Panthers	23	12	8	3	10	72	68	+4	27
3	ME	New York Islanders	20	10	6	4	8	65	57	+8	24
4	ME	Washington Capitals	19	10	9	0	8	64	70	−6	20
5	AT	Buffalo Sabres	21	8	9	4	6	58	74	−16	20
6	ME	Philadelphia Flyers	24	7	11	6	7	57	80	−23	20
7	AT	Detroit Red Wings	22	8	11	3	6	58	68	−10	19
8	AT	Toronto Maple Leafs	23	8	13	2	7	72	82	−10	18
9	ME	Pittsburgh Penguins	20	7	11	2	3	62	71	−9	16
10	ME	Columbus Blue Jackets	19	7	12	0	2	46	63	−17	14

Updated to game(s) played on November 18, 2026. Source: National Hockey League
Rules for classification: 1) Fewer number of games played (GP, only during regular season); 2) Greater number of regulation wins (RW); 3) Greater number of wins in regulation and overtime, excluding shootout wins (ROW); 4) Greater number of total wins, including shootouts (W); 5) Greater number of points earned in head-to-head play; if teams played an uneven number of head-to-head games, the result of the first game on the home ice of the team with the extra home game is discarded; 6) Greater goal differential (GD); 7) Greater number of goals scored (GF)

== Schedule and results ==
=== Preseason ===
The Bruins revealed their preseason schedule on June 24, 2026.

2026 preseason game log: 2–1–1 (home: 2–0–0; road: 0–1–1)
#	Date	Visitor	Score	Home	OT	Decision	Attendance	Record	Recap
1	September 20	Washington	2–3	Boston	SO	DiPietro	17,850	1–0–0
2	September 22	Philadelphia	1–5	Boston		Swayman	17,850	2–0–0
3	September 24	Boston	0–2	Philadelphia		DiPietro	14,981	2–1–0
4	September 25	Boston	2–3	Washington	OT	Swayman	11,557	2–1–1

=== Regular season ===
The Bruins revealed their regular season schedule on July 16, 2026.

2026–27 game log

September: 1–0–0 (Home: 1–0–0; Road: 0–0–0)
#	Date	Visitor	Score	Home	OT	Decision	Attendance	Record	Pts	Recap
1	September 29	NY Rangers	0–3	Boston		Swayman	17,850	1–0–0	2

October: 9–4–1 (Home: 5–1–0; Road: 4–3–1)
#	Date	Visitor	Score	Home	OT	Decision	Attendance	Record	Pts	Recap
2	October 2	Boston	4–3	Winnipeg	OT	Swayman	15,209	2–0–0	4
3	October 3	Boston	1–4	Minnesota		DiPietro	19,185	2–1–0	4
4	October 5	Ottawa	4–1	Boston		Swayman	17,850	2–2–0	4
5	October 8	Utah	1–6	Boston		Swayman	17,850	3–2–0	6
6	October 10	Philadelphia	1–5	Boston		Swayman	17,850	4–2–0	8
7	October 13	Boston	6–3	San Jose		Swayman	14,748	5–2–0	10
8	October 16	Boston	4–2	Anaheim		DiPietro	17,174	6–2–0	12
9	October 17	Boston	4–1	Los Angeles		Swayman	18,145	7–2–0	14
10	October 20	Boston	2–3	Dallas	OT	Swayman	18,532	7–2–1	15
11	October 22	Nashville	0–6	Boston		DiPietro	17,850	8–2–1	17
12	October 24	San Jose	4–6	Boston		Swayman	17,850	9–2–1	19
13	October 27	Boston	1–2	Carolina		Swayman	18,811	9–3–1	19
14	October 29	Boston	1–4	St. Louis		Swayman	18,096	9–4–1	19
15	October 31	Chicago	4–5	Boston	OT	DiPietro	17,850	10–4–1	21

November: 4–3–0 (Home: 2–3–0; Road: 2–0–0)
#	Date	Visitor	Score	Home	OT	Decision	Attendance	Record	Pts	Recap
16	November 2	Vegas	2–3	Boston	SO	Swayman	17,850	11–4–1	23
17	November 5	Boston	6–2	Pittsburgh		DiPietro	17,316	12–4–1	25
18	November 8	Florida	1–4	Boston		Swayman	17,850	13–4–1	27
19	November 12	Montreal	5–2	Boston		Swayman	17,850	13–5–1	27
20	November 14	Minnesota	6-2	Boston		Swayman	17,850	13–6–1	27
21	November 17	Los Angeles	3–0	Boston		DiPietro	17,850	13–7–1	27
22	November 18	Boston	4–1	Detroit		Swayman	18,340	14–7–1	29
23	November 21	Washington	–	Boston				0–0–0
24	November 25	Winnipeg	–	Boston				0–0–0
25	November 27	Toronto	–	Boston				0–0–0
26	November 29	Vancouver	–	Boston				0–0–0

December: 0–0–0 (Home: 0–0–0; Road: 0–0–0)
#	Date	Visitor	Score	Home	OT	Decision	Attendance	Record	Pts	Recap
27	December 1	Colorado	–	Boston				0–0–0
28	December 5	Detroit	–	Boston				0–0–0
29	December 8	Boston	–	Florida				0–0–0
30	December 10	Boston	–	Tampa Bay				0–0–0
31	December 12	New Jersey	–	Boston				0–0–0
32	December 13	Boston	–	Carolina				0–0–0
33	December 15	Florida	–	Boston				0–0–0
34	December 17	St. Louis	–	Boston				0–0–0
35	December 19	Boston	–	New Jersey				0–0–0
36	December 20	Philadelphia	–	Boston				0–0–0
37	December 22	Boston	–	NY Islanders				0–0–0
38	December 26	NY Islanders	–	Boston				0–0–0
39	December 27	Boston	–	New Jersey				0–0–0
40	December 30	Edmonton	–	Boston				0–0–0

January: 0–0–0 (Home: 0–0–0; Road: 0–0–0)
#	Date	Visitor	Score	Home	OT	Decision	Attendance	Record	Pts	Recap
41	January 1	Boston	–	Chicago				0–0–0
42	January 2	Boston	–	Columbus				0–0–0
43	January 5	Buffalo	–	Boston				0–0–0
44	January 6	Boston	–	Montreal				0–0–0
45	January 9	Boston	–	Detroit				0–0–0
46	January 12	Carolina	–	Boston				0–0–0
47	January 14	Dallas	–	Boston				0–0–0
48	January 16	Boston	–	NY Rangers				0–0–0
49	January 18	Tampa Bay	–	Boston				0–0–0
50	January 20	Boston	–	Colorado				0–0–0
51	January 22	Boston	–	Vegas				0–0–0
52	January 23	Boston	–	Utah				0–0–0
53	January 26	Columbus	–	Boston				0–0–0
54	January 28	Boston	–	Ottawa				0–0–0
55	January 30	Toronto	–	Boston				0–0–0

February: 0–0–0 (Home: 0–0–0; Road: 0–0–0)
#	Date	Visitor	Score	Home	OT	Decision	Attendance	Record	Pts	Recap
56	February 10	Boston	–	Toronto				0–0–0
57	February 13	Columbus	–	Boston				0–0–0
58	February 15	Anaheim	–	Boston				0–0–0
59	February 17	Boston	–	Calgary				0–0–0
60	February 19	Boston	–	Edmonton				0–0–0
61	February 21	Boston	–	Vancouver				0–0–0
62	February 22	Boston	–	Seattle				0–0–0
63	February 25	Washington	–	Boston				0–0–0
64	February 27	Detroit	–	Boston				0–0–0

March: 0–0–0 (Home: 0–0–0; Road: 0–0–0)
#	Date	Visitor	Score	Home	OT	Decision	Attendance	Record	Pts	Recap
65	March 3	Boston	–	NY Rangers				0–0–0
66	March 4	Boston	–	Ottawa				0–0–0
67	March 6	Pittsburgh	–	Boston				0–0–0
68	March 8	Seattle	–	Boston				0–0–0
69	March 10	Boston	–	Montreal				0–0–0
70	March 11	Boston	–	Pittsburgh				0–0–0
71	March 13	Calgary	–	Boston				0–0–0
72	March 15	NY Islanders	–	Boston				0–0–0
73	March 18	Boston	–	Philadelphia				0–0–0
74	March 20	Boston	–	Nashville				0–0–0
75	March 23	Buffalo	–	Boston				0–0–0
76	March 25	Ottawa	–	Boston				0–0–0
77	March 26	Boston	–	Washington				0–0–0
78	March 30	Montreal	–	Boston				0–0–0

April: 0–0–0 (Home: 0–0–0; Road: 0–0–0)
#	Date	Visitor	Score	Home	OT	Decision	Attendance	Record	Pts	Recap
79	April 1	Boston	–	Buffalo				0–0–0
80	April 3	Tampa Bay	–	Boston				0–0–0
81	April 5	Boston	–	Toronto				0–0–0
82	April 7	Boston	–	Buffalo				0–0–0
83	April 9	Boston	–	Florida				0–0–0
84	April 10	Boston	–	Tampa Bay				0–0–0

== Roster ==
Updated October 7, 2026

No.	Nat	Player	Pos	S/G	Age	Acquired	Birthplace
45	(Canada)	Jonathan Aspirot	D	L	27	2025	Mascouche, Quebec
17	(United States)	Will Borgen	D	R	29	2026	Moorhead, Minnesota
59	(Canada)	Frederic Brunet	D	L	23	2022	Gatineau, Quebec
75	(United States)	Connor Clifton	D	R	31	2026	Long Branch, New Jersey
30	(Canada)	Michael DiPietro	G	L	27	2022	Windsor, Ontario
39	(Canada)	Morgan Geekie	RW	R	28	2023	Strathclair, Manitoba
44	(United States)	James Hagens	C	L	20	2025	Hauppauge, New York
84	(Canada)	Tanner Jeannot (A)	LW	L	29	2025	Oxbow, Saskatchewan
47	(United States)	Mark Kastelic	C	R	27	2024	Phoenix, Arizona
92	(Russia)	Marat Khusnutdinov	C	L	24	2025	Moscow, Russia
52	(United States)	Sean Kuraly	C	L	33	2025	Lewiston, New York
28	(Sweden)	Elias Lindholm	C	R	31	2024	Boden, Sweden
27	(Sweden)	Hampus Lindholm (A)	D	L	32	2022	Helsingborg, Sweden
6	(United States)	Mason Lohrei	D	L	25	2020	Baton Rouge, Louisiana
73	(United States)	Charlie McAvoy (A)	D	R	28	2016	Long Beach, New York
93	(Canada)	Fraser Minten	C	L	22	2025	Vancouver, British Columbia
11	(United States)	Casey Mittelstadt	C	L	27	2025	Eden Prairie, Minnesota
88	(Czech Republic)	David Pastrňák (C)	RW	R	30	2014	Havířov, Czech Republic
10	(Germany)	JJ Peterka	LW	L	24	2026	Munich, Germany
51	(Canada)	Matt Poitras	C	R	22	2022	Ajax, Ontario
1	(United States)	Jeremy Swayman	G	L	27	2017	Anchorage, Alaska
18	(Czech Republic)	Pavel Zacha	C	L	29	2022	Brno, Czech Republic
91	(Russia)	Nikita Zadorov	D	L	31	2024	Moscow, Russia

== Player statistics ==
Regular season
Player	GP	G	A	Pts	+/−	PIM

=== Goaltenders ===
Regular season
Player	GP	GS	TOI	W	L	OT	GA	GAA	SA	SV%	SO	G	A	PIM

^{†}Denotes player spent time with another team before joining the Bruins. Stats reflect time with the Bruins only.
^{‡}Denotes player was traded mid-season. Stats reflect time with the Bruins only.

== Transactions ==
The Bruins have been involved in the following transactions during the 2026–27 season.

Key:

† Contract is entry-level.
‡ Contract initially takes effect in the 2027–28 season.

=== Trades ===
Date	Details		Ref
July 1, 2026	To Boston Bruins Kalle Vaisanen; 4th-round pick in 2028	To New York Rangers Joonas Korpisalo	
July 1, 2026	To Boston Bruins Will Borgen	To New York Rangers 2nd-round pick in 2027 conditional (Note: New York will receive Boston's second-round pick in 2028 if Boston qualifies for the Eastern Conference Finals in either the 2027 or 2028 Stanley Cup Playoffs, and Borgen plays in 50% of Boston's playoff games; otherwise, New York will receive Boston's third-round pick in 2028.) 2nd-round pick in 2028 or 3rd-round pick in 2028	

=== Players acquired ===
Date	Player	Former team	Term	Via	Ref
July 1, 2026	Brendan Gaunce	Columbus Blue Jackets		Free agency	
July 1, 2026	Connor Clifton	Pittsburgh Penguins	2-year	Free agency	
July 1, 2026	Maxence Guénette	Philadelphia Flyers		Free agency	
July 1, 2026	Brian Halonen	New Jersey Devils		Free agency	
July 1, 2026	Jiří Patera	Vancouver Canucks		Free agency	
July 1, 2026	Attilio Biasca	HC Fribourg-Gotteron (NL)	2-year	Free agency	

=== Players lost ===
Date	Player	New team	Term	Via	Ref
July 1, 2026	Viktor Arvidsson	Detroit Red Wings	2-year	Free agency	
July 1, 2026	Riley Tufte	New Jersey Devils		Free agency	
July 1, 2026	Michael Callahan	Tampa Bay Lightning	1-year	Free agency	
July 1, 2026	Andrew Peeke	Utah Mammoth	1-year	Free agency	
July 20, 2026	Georgii Merkulov	Colorado Avalanche		Free agency	

=== Signings ===
Date	Player	Term	Ref
July 1, 2026	Attilio Biasca	2-year	

== Draft picks ==
Round	#	Player	Pos	Nationality	College/Junior/Club team (League)
2	56	Yuri Ivanov	G	Russia	JHC Spartak (MHL)
3	88	Nils Bartholdsson	RW	Sweden	Rögle BK (J20 Nationell)
4	104	Matvei Kotkov	RW	Russia	Loko Yaroslavl (MHL)
4	122	Oscar Olsson	LW	Sweden	Orebro HK (SHL)
5	157	Jacob Vandeven	D	Canada	Komoka Kings (GOJHL)
6	170	Roberto Henriquez	G	Slovakia	Green Bay Gamblers (USHL)
7	216	Cullen McCrate	D	United States	Fargo Force (USHL)
