= 2026–27 Washington Capitals season =

National Hockey League season

2026–27 Washington Capitals
- Division: Metropolitan
- Conference: Eastern
- 2026–27 record: 10–9–0
- Home record: 7–5–0
- Road record: 3–4–0
- Goals for: 64
- Goals against: 70

Team information
- General manager: Chris Patrick
- Coach: Spencer Carbery
- Captain: Alexander Ovechkin
- Alternate captains: Matt Roy; Dylan Strome; Tom Wilson
- Arena: Capital One Arena
- Minor league affiliates: Hershey Bears (AHL); South Carolina Stingrays (ECHL)

Team leaders
- Goals: Alex Tuch (12)
- Assists: Dylan Strome (13)
- Points: Dylan Strome (16)
- Penalty minutes: Tom Wilson (45)
- Plus/minus: Vincent Desharnais (+9)
- Wins: Logan Thompson (7)
- Goals against average: Logan Thompson (3.23)

The 2026–27 Washington Capitals season is the 53rd season (52nd season of play) for the National Hockey League (NHL) franchise that was established on June 11, 1974.

This will be the final season of longtime captain Alexander Ovechkin, who announced that this would be his last season with the team.

== Standings ==
=== Divisional standings ===
Metropolitan Division
Pos	Team	GP	W	L	OTL	RW	GF	GA	GD	Pts
1	Carolina Hurricanes	21	16	3	2	15	87	47	+40	34
2	New Jersey Devils	22	15	7	0	10	82	64	+18	30
3	New York Rangers	22	13	8	1	13	67	58	+9	27
4	New York Islanders	20	10	6	4	8	65	57	+8	24
5	Washington Capitals	19	10	9	0	8	64	70	−6	20
6	Philadelphia Flyers	24	7	11	6	7	57	80	−23	20
7	Pittsburgh Penguins	20	7	11	2	3	62	71	−9	16
8	Columbus Blue Jackets	19	7	12	0	2	46	63	−17	14

Updated to game(s) played on November 18, 2026. Source: National Hockey League
Rules for classification: 1) Fewer number of games played (GP, only during regular season); 2) Greater number of regulation wins (RW); 3) Greater number of wins in regulation and overtime, excluding shootout wins (ROW); 4) Greater number of total wins, including shootouts (W); 5) Greater number of points earned in head-to-head play; if teams played an uneven number of head-to-head games, the result of the first game on the home ice of the team with the extra home game is discarded; 6) Greater goal differential (GD); 7) Greater number of goals scored (GF)

=== Conference standings ===
Eastern Conference Wild Card
Pos	Div	Team	GP	W	L	OTL	RW	GF	GA	GD	Pts
1	AT	Boston Bruins	22	14	7	1	11	76	56	+20	29
2	AT	Florida Panthers	23	12	8	3	10	72	68	+4	27
3	ME	New York Islanders	20	10	6	4	8	65	57	+8	24
4	ME	Washington Capitals	19	10	9	0	8	64	70	−6	20
5	AT	Buffalo Sabres	21	8	9	4	6	58	74	−16	20
6	ME	Philadelphia Flyers	24	7	11	6	7	57	80	−23	20
7	AT	Detroit Red Wings	22	8	11	3	6	58	68	−10	19
8	AT	Toronto Maple Leafs	23	8	13	2	7	72	82	−10	18
9	ME	Pittsburgh Penguins	20	7	11	2	3	62	71	−9	16
10	ME	Columbus Blue Jackets	19	7	12	0	2	46	63	−17	14

Updated to game(s) played on November 18, 2026. Source: National Hockey League
Rules for classification: 1) Fewer number of games played (GP, only during regular season); 2) Greater number of regulation wins (RW); 3) Greater number of wins in regulation and overtime, excluding shootout wins (ROW); 4) Greater number of total wins, including shootouts (W); 5) Greater number of points earned in head-to-head play; if teams played an uneven number of head-to-head games, the result of the first game on the home ice of the team with the extra home game is discarded; 6) Greater goal differential (GD); 7) Greater number of goals scored (GF)

== Schedule and results ==
=== Preseason ===
The preseason schedule was released on June 22, 2026.

2026 preseason game log: 3–0–1 (Home: 2–0–0; Road: 1–0–1)

#	Date	Visitor	Score	Home	OT	Decision	Location	Attendance	Record
1	September 20	Washington	2–3	Boston	SO	Thompson	TD Garden	17,850	0–0–1
2^{A}	September 21	Philadelphia	2–5	Washington		Stevenson	Giant Center	10,500	1–0–1
3	September 25	Boston	2–3	Washington	OT	Thompson	Capital One Arena	11,557	2–0–1
4	September 26	Washington	5–1	Philadelphia		Lindgren	Xfinity Mobile Arena	17,339	3–0–1

Legend

Win Loss OT/SO Loss
^{A} – Game played in Hershey, Pennsylvania

=== Regular season ===
The regular season schedule was released on July 16, 2026.

2026–27 game log
October: 8–4–0 (Home: 6–2–0; Road: 2–2–0)

#	Date	Visitor	Score	Home	OT	Decision	Location	Attendance	Record	Points	Recap
1	October 2	Washington	5–2	Carolina		Thompson	Lenovo Center	18,905	1–0–0	2	
2	October 3	Washington	1–3	Tampa Bay		Lindgren	Benchmark International Arena	19,092	1–1–0	2	
3	October 7	Pittsburgh	3–5	Washington		Thompson	Capital One Arena	18,347	2–1–0	4	
4	October 9	NY Rangers	1–3	Washington		Thompson	Capital One Arena	17,992	3–1–0	6	
5	October 11	Seattle	5–3	Washington		Thompson	Capital One Arena	18,107	3–2–0	6	
6	October 13	Washington	2–4	Carolina		Thompson	Lenovo Center	18,828	3–3–0	6	
7	October 14	Montreal	4–5	Washington		Lindgren	Capital One Arena	16,719	4–3–0	8	
8	October 17	New Jersey	2–4	Washington		Thompson	Capital One Arena	16,834	5–3–0	10	
9	October 20	Los Angeles	5–2	Washington		Thompson	Capital One Arena	16,182	5–4–0	10	
10	October 24	Buffalo	3–4	Washington	OT	Lindgren	Capital One Arena	18,347	6–4–0	12	
11	October 28	Philadelphia	2–5	Washington		Thompson	Capital One Arena	17,391	7–4–0	14	
12	October 29	Washington	4–3	Nashville		Lindgren	Bridgestone Arena	17,159	8–4–0	16	

November: 2–5–0 (Home: 1–3–0; Road: 1–2–0)

#	Date	Visitor	Score	Home	OT	Decision	Location	Attendance	Record	Points	Recap
13	November 1	Minnesota	5–1	Washington		Thompson	Capital One Arena	17,393	8–5–0	16	
14	November 3	Dallas	6–5	Washington		Lindgren	Capital One Arena	16,956	8–6–0	16	
15	November 7	Florida	3–4	Washington		Thompson	Capital One Arena	18,347	9–6–0	18	
16	November 10	Washington	3–2	Ottawa	OT	Thompson	Canadian Tire Centre	16,679	10–6–0	20	
17	November 12	Washington	2–5	New Jersey		Thompson	Prudential Center	15,035	10–7–0	20	
18	November 14	New Jersey	7–4	Washington		Lindgren	Capital One Arena	18,347	10–8–0	20	
19	November 17	Washington	2–5	Tampa Bay		Thompson	Benchmark International Arena	19,092	10–9–0	20	
20	November 19	Buffalo	6–3	Washington		Lindgren	Capital One Arena	18,347	10–10–0	20	
21	November 21	Washington	–	Boston			TD Garden				
22	November 25	Philadelphia	–	Washington			Capital One Arena				
23	November 27	Florida	–	Washington			Capital One Arena				
24	November 28	Washington	–	St. Louis			Enterprise Center				

December: 0–0–0 (Home: 0–0–0; Road: 0–0–0)

#	Date	Visitor	Score	Home	OT	Decision	Location	Attendance	Record	Points	Recap
25	December 1	Vancouver	–	Washington			Capital One Arena				
26	December 3	Washington	–	Edmonton			Rogers Place				
27	December 5	Washington	–	Calgary			Scotiabank Saddledome				
28	December 7	Washington	–	Vancouver			Rogers Arena				
29	December 10	Washington	–	Seattle			Climate Pledge Arena				
30	December 12	Washington	–	Colorado			Ball Arena				
31	December 15	Washington	–	Dallas			American Airlines Center				
32	December 17	Detroit	–	Washington			Capital One Arena				
33	December 19	St. Louis	–	Washington			Capital One Arena				
34	December 21	Washington	–	Toronto			Scotiabank Arena				
35	December 26	Columbus	–	Washington			Capital One Arena				
36	December 28	Edmonton	–	Washington			Capital One Arena				
37	December 30	Washington	–	NY Islanders			UBS Arena				
38	December 31	Washington	–	Columbus			Nationwide Arena				

January: 0–0–0 (Home: 0–0–0; Road: 0–0–0)

#	Date	Visitor	Score	Home	OT	Decision	Location	Attendance	Record	Points	Recap
39	January 2	Ottawa	–	Washington			Capital One Arena				
40	January 4	Toronto	–	Washington			Capital One Arena				
41	January 6	Washington	–	Los Angeles			Crypto.com Arena				
42	January 8	Washington	–	San Jose			SAP Center				
43	January 10	Washington	–	Anaheim			Honda Center				
44	January 12	Vegas	–	Washington			Capital One Arena				
45	January 14	Carolina	–	Washington			Capital One Arena				
46	January 16	Colorado	–	Washington			Capital One Arena				
47	January 18	Washington	–	Pittsburgh			PPG Paints Arena				
48	January 19	Montreal	–	Washington			Capital One Arena				
49	January 22	NY Islanders	–	Washington			Capital One Arena				
50	January 24	Washington	–	New Jersey			Prudential Center				
51	January 29	Washington	–	Utah			Delta Center				
52	January 30	Washington	–	Vegas			T-Mobile Arena				

February: 0–0–0 (Home: 0–0–0; Road: 0–0–0)

#	Date	Visitor	Score	Home	OT	Decision	Location	Attendance	Record	Points	Recap
53	February 2	Winnipeg	–	Washington			Capital One Arena				
54	February 3	Washington	–	Florida			Amerant Bank Arena				
55	February 13	Washington	–	Montreal			Bell Centre				
56	February 14	Utah	–	Washington			Capital One Arena				
57	February 16	Anaheim	–	Washington			Capital One Arena				
58	February 19	San Jose	–	Washington			Capital One Arena				
59	February 21	Nashville	–	Washington			Capital One Arena				
60	February 23	NY Rangers	–	Washington			Capital One Arena				
61	February 25	Washington	–	Boston			TD Garden				
62	February 26	Washington	–	NY Rangers			Madison Square Garden				

March: 0–0–0 (Home: 0–0–0; Road: 0–0–0)

#	Date	Visitor	Score	Home	OT	Decision	Location	Attendance	Record	Points	Recap
63	March 1	Washington	–	NY Islanders			UBS Arena				
64	March 3	Carolina	–	Washington			Capital One Arena				
65	March 5	Washington	–	Winnipeg			Canada Life Centre				
66	March 7	Washington	–	Minnesota			Grand Casino Arena				
67	March 9	Calgary	–	Washington			Capital One Arena				
68	March 10	Washington	–	Chicago			United Center				
69	March 13	Washington	–	Pittsburgh			PPG Paints Arena				
70	March 15	Tampa Bay	–	Washington			Capital One Arena				
71	March 17	NY Islanders	–	Washington			Capital One Arena				
72	March 18	Washington	–	Buffalo			KeyBank Center				
73	March 21	Washington	–	NY Rangers			Madison Square Garden				
74	March 23	Detroit	–	Washington			Capital One Arena				
75	March 24	Washington	–	Detroit			Little Caesars Arena				
76	March 26	Boston	–	Washington			Capital One Arena				
77	March 28	Washington	–	Toronto			Scotiabank Arena				
78	March 30	Chicago	–	Washington			Capital One Arena				

April: 0–0–0 (Home: 0–0–0; Road: 0–0–0)

#	Date	Visitor	Score	Home	OT	Decision	Location	Attendance	Record	Points	Recap
79	April 1	Washington	–	Philadelphia			Xfinity Mobile Arena				
80	April 3	Columbus	–	Washington			Capital One Arena				
81	April 4	Pittsburgh	–	Washington			Capital One Arena				
82	April 6	Washington	–	Columbus			Nationwide Arena				
83	April 8	Washington	–	Ottawa			Canadian Tire Centre				
84	April 10	Washington	–	Philadelphia			Xfinity Mobile Arena				

Win (2 points) Loss (0 points) Overtime/shootout loss (1 point)

== Roster ==
Updated November 9, 2026

No.	Nat	Player	Pos	S/G	Age	Acquired	Birthplace
72	(Canada)	Anthony Beauvillier	LW	L	29	2025	Sorel-Tracy, Quebec
6	(Canada)	Jakob Chychrun	D	L	28	2024	Boca Raton, Florida
73	(Canada)	Vincent Desharnais	D	R	30	2026	Laval, Quebec
80	(Canada)	Pierre-Luc Dubois	C	L	28	2024	Sainte-Agathe-des-Monts, Quebec
42	(Slovakia)	Martin Fehérváry	D	L	27	2018	Bratislava, Slovakia
53	(United States)	Ethen Frank	C	R	28	2022	Papillion, Nebraska
4	(United States)	Justin Holl	D	R	34	2026	Tonka Bay, Minnesota
44	(United States)	Cole Hutson	D	L	20	2024	St. Louis, Missouri
22	(Canada)	Boone Jenner	C	L	33	2026	London, Ontario
25	(Canada)	Jordan Kyrou	RW	R	28	2026	Toronto, Ontario
9	(United States)	Ryan Leonard	RW	R	21	2023	Northampton, Massachusetts
27	(Sweden)	Timothy Liljegren	D	R	27	2026	Kristianstad, Sweden
79	(United States)	Charlie Lindgren	G	R	32	2022	Lakeville, Minnesota
63	(Russia)	Ivan Miroshnichenko	LW	R	22	2022	Ussuriysk, Russia
8	(Russia)	Alexander Ovechkin (C)	LW	R	41	2004	Moscow, Soviet Union
21	(Belarus)	Aliaksei Protas	C	L	25	2019	Vitebsk, Belarus
62	(Belarus)	Ilya Protas	LW	L	20	2024	Vitebsk, Belarus
3	(United States)	Matt Roy (A)	D	R	31	2024	Canton, Michigan
38	(Sweden)	Rasmus Sandin	D	L	26	2023	Uppsala, Sweden
34	(Canada)	Justin Sourdif	RW	R	24	2025	Richmond, British Columbia
29	(United States)	Jack St. Ivany	D	R	27	2026	Manhattan Beach, California
17	(Canada)	Dylan Strome (A)	C	L	29	2022	Mississauga, Ontario
48	(Canada)	Logan Thompson	G	R	29	2024	Calgary, Alberta
89	(United States)	Alex Tuch	RW	R	30	2026	Syracuse, New York
43	(Canada)	Tom Wilson (A)	RW	R	32	2012	Toronto, Ontario

== Player stats ==
=== Skaters ===
Regular season
Player	GP	G	A	Pts	+/−	PIM

=== Goaltenders ===
Regular season
Player	GP	GS	TOI	W	L	OT	GA	GAA	SA	SV%	SO	G	A	PIM

^{†}Denotes player spent time with another team before joining the Capitals. Stats reflect time with the Capitals only.
^{‡}No longer with the Capitals.

== Transactions ==
=== Trades ===
Date	Details		Ref
June 23, 2026	To St. Louis Blues Milton Gastrin; Connor McMichael; 1st-round pick in 2026 (#16 overall)	To Washington Capitals Jordan Kyrou	
June 24, 2026	To Buffalo Sabres David Kampf; SJS 3rd-round pick in 2027	To Washington Capitals Alex Tuch	
June 25, 2026	To Pittsburgh Penguins Hendrix Lapierre	To Washington Capitals 3rd-round pick in 2027; SJS 5th-round pick in 2028	
June 25, 2026	To New Jersey Devils Declan Chisholm	To Washington Capitals 4th-round pick in 2027	
June 27, 2026	To Columbus Blue Jackets 4th-round pick in 2026 (#112 overall); 5th-round pick in 2028	To Washington Capitals TOR 4th-round pick in 2026 (#101 overall)	
July 13, 2026	To Buffalo Sabres Zac Funk	To Washington Capitals Tyler Kopff	
November 1, 2026	To New Jersey Devils 7th-round pick in 2027	To Washington Capitals Rémi Poirier	

=== Players acquired ===
Date	Player	New team	Term	Via	Ref
July 1, 2026	Jonny Brodzinski	New York Rangers	1-year	Free agency	
July 1, 2026	Justin Holl	St. Louis Blues	1-year	Free agency	
July 1, 2026	Vincent Desharnais	San Jose Sharks	4-year	Free agency	
July 1, 2026	Josh Dunne	Buffalo Sabres	1-year	Free agency	
July 1, 2026	Boone Jenner	Columbus Blue Jackets	4-year	Free agency	
July 5, 2026	Jacob MacDonald	Colorado Avalanche	1-year	Free agency	

=== Players lost ===
Date	Player	New team	Term	Via	Ref
July 1, 2026	Trevor van Riemsdyk	Pittsburgh Penguins	2-year	Free agency	
July 1, 2026	Brandon Duhaime	Toronto Maple Leafs	3-year	Free agency	
July 1, 2026	Corey Schueneman	Anaheim Ducks	2-year	Free agency	
July 2, 2026	Henry Rybinski	Toronto Maple Leafs	2-year	Free agency	
July 2, 2026	Brett Leason	San Jose Sharks	1-year	Free agency	

== Draft picks ==
Below are the Washington Capitals' selections at the 2026 NHL entry draft, which was held on June 26 and 27, 2026, at KeyBank Center in Buffalo, New York.

Round	#	Player	Pos	Nationality	College/Junior/Club team (League)
1	18	Oliver Suvanto	C	Finland	Tappara (Liiga)
4	101	Tyus Sparks	C	United States	Spokane Chiefs (WHL)
5	144	Brian McFadden	D	United States	Thayer Tigers (HS-MA)
7	208	Logan Stuart	C	United States	U.S. NTDP (USHL)
