= 2026–27 Seattle Kraken season =

National Hockey League season

2026–27 Seattle Kraken
- Division: 3rd Pacific
- Conference: 6th Western
- 2026–27 record: 10–8–1
- Home record: 6–4–0
- Road record: 4–4–1
- Goals for: 64
- Goals against: 67

Team information
- General manager: Jason Botterill
- Coach: Lane Lambert
- Captain: Jordan Eberle
- Alternate captains: Matty Beniers; Vince Dunn; Adam Larsson; Brandon Montour
- Arena: Climate Pledge Arena
- Minor league affiliates: Coachella Valley Firebirds (AHL); Kansas City Mavericks (ECHL)

Team leaders
- Goals: Berkly Catton; Frédérick Gaudreau (8)
- Assists: Brandon Montour; Chandler Stephenson (11)
- Points: Berkly Catton (17)
- Penalty minutes: Brandon Montour (37)
- Plus/minus: Matty Beniers; Berkly Catton (+6)
- Wins: Philipp Grubauer (6)
- Goals against average: Philipp Grubauer (2.93)

The 2026–27 Seattle Kraken season is the sixth season for the National Hockey League (NHL) franchise. They're playing their home games at Climate Pledge Arena.

== Standings ==
=== Divisional standings ===
Pacific Division
Pos	Team	GP	W	L	OTL	RW	GF	GA	GD	Pts
1	Edmonton Oilers	24	17	4	3	14	93	65	+28	37
2	Vegas Golden Knights	24	13	6	5	11	80	71	+9	31
3	Anaheim Ducks	23	11	11	1	10	85	89	−4	23
4	San Jose Sharks	24	10	12	2	3	65	86	−21	22
5	Seattle Kraken	19	10	8	1	7	64	67	−3	21
6	Calgary Flames	23	10	12	1	9	57	80	−23	21
7	Los Angeles Kings	20	7	11	2	4	56	66	−10	16
8	Vancouver Canucks	24	5	18	1	3	67	105	−38	11

Updated to game(s) played on November 19, 2026. Source: National Hockey League
Rules for classification: 1) Fewer number of games played (GP, only during regular season); 2) Greater number of regulation wins (RW); 3) Greater number of wins in regulation and overtime, excluding shootout wins (ROW); 4) Greater number of total wins, including shootouts (W); 5) Greater number of points earned in head-to-head play; if teams played an uneven number of head-to-head games, the result of the first game on the home ice of the team with the extra home game is discarded; 6) Greater goal differential (GD); 7) Greater number of goals scored (GF)

=== Conference standings ===
Western Conference Wild Card
Pos	Div	Team	GP	W	L	OTL	RW	GF	GA	GD	Pts
1	CE	Nashville Predators	22	11	6	5	8	67	66	+1	27
2	CE	Utah Mammoth	23	11	9	3	9	77	79	−2	25
3	CE	Winnipeg Jets	23	11	9	3	8	71	77	−6	25
4	CE	St. Louis Blues	22	11	9	2	10	68	67	+1	24
5	PA	San Jose Sharks	24	10	12	2	3	65	86	−21	22
6	PA	Seattle Kraken	19	10	8	1	7	64	67	−3	21
7	PA	Calgary Flames	23	10	12	1	9	57	80	−23	21
8	PA	Los Angeles Kings	20	7	11	2	4	56	66	−10	16
9	CE	Chicago Blackhawks	22	6	14	2	4	54	90	−36	14
10	PA	Vancouver Canucks	24	5	18	1	3	67	105	−38	11

Updated to game(s) played on November 19, 2026. Source: National Hockey League
Rules for classification: 1) Fewer number of games played (GP, only during regular season); 2) Greater number of regulation wins (RW); 3) Greater number of wins in regulation and overtime, excluding shootout wins (ROW); 4) Greater number of total wins, including shootouts (W); 5) Greater number of points earned in head-to-head play; if teams played an uneven number of head-to-head games, the result of the first game on the home ice of the team with the extra home game is discarded; 6) Greater goal differential (GD); 7) Greater number of goals scored (GF)

== Schedule and results ==
=== Preseason ===
The Seattle Kraken's preseason schedule was released on June 24, 2026.

2026 preseason game log: 3–1–0 (home: 2–0–0; road: 1–1–0)

Game	Date	Visitor	Score	Home	OT	Decision	Location	Attendance	Record	Recap
1	September 19	Vancouver	2–4	Seattle		Kokko	Climate Pledge Arena	17,151	1–0–0	
2	September 20	Seattle	4–2	Calgary		Kokko	Scotiabank Saddledome	15,634	2–0–0	
3	September 24	Calgary	3–4	Seattle	SO	Grubauer	Climate Pledge Arena	17,151	3–0–0	
4	September 26	Seattle	3–4	Vancouver		Daccord	Rogers Arena	17,237	3–1–0	

Win Loss Overtime/shootout loss

=== Regular season ===
Seattle Kraken regular season game log featuring all 84 Kraken games played during the 2026-27 NHL regular season
2026–27 game log: 10–8–1 (home: 6–4–0; road: 4–4–1)

October: 8–5–1 (home: 4–2–0; road: 4–3–1)
#	Date	Visitor	Score	Home	OT	Decision	Location	Attendance	Record	Pts	Recap
1	October 1	Seattle	6–1	Calgary		Daccord	Scotiabank Saddledome	18,494	1–0–0	2
2	October 3	Seattle	1–3	Edmonton		Grubauer	Rogers Place	18,070	1–1–0	2
3	October 4	Calgary	1–6	Seattle		Daccord	Climate Pledge Arena	17,151	2–1–0	4
4	October 6	Vegas	6–2	Seattle		Daccord	Climate Pledge Arena	17,151	2–2–0	4
5	October 9	Seattle	6–3	Detroit		Grubauer	Little Caesars Arena	17,603	3–2–0	6
6	October 11	Seattle	5–3	Washington		Daccord	Capital One Arena	18,107	4–2–0	8
7	October 13	Seattle	3–2	Philadelphia	SO	Grubauer	Xfinity Mobile Arena	17,851	5–2–0	10
8	October 15	Seattle	3–4	Tampa Bay	OT	Grubauer	Benchmark International Arena	19,092	5–2–1	11
9	October 17	Seattle	3–8	Florida		Daccord	Amerant Bank Arena	19,169	5–3–1	11
10	October 20	Detroit	3–4	Seattle	SO	Grubauer	Climate Pledge Arena	17,151	6–3–1	13
11	October 22	Utah	3–5	Seattle		Grubauer	Climate Pledge Arena	17,151	7–3–1	15
12	October 24	Minnesota	5–1	Seattle		Daccord	Climate Pledge Arena	17,151	7–4–1	15
13	October 28	Toronto	4–5	Seattle		Grubauer	Climate Pledge Arena	17,151	8–4–1	17
14	October 30	Seattle	2–6	Calgary		Grubauer	Scotiabank Saddledome	16,944	8–5–1	17

November: 2–3–0 (home: 2–2–0; road: 0–1–0)
#	Date	Visitor	Score	Home	OT	Decision	Location	Attendance	Record	Pts	Recap
15	November 4	Calgary	1–2	Seattle	OT	Daccord	Climate Pledge Arena	17,151	9–5–1	19
16	November 7	NY Rangers	4–3	Seattle		Grubauer	Climate Pledge Arena	17,151	9–6–1	19
17^{A}	November 12	Carolina	4–1	Seattle		Grubauer	Veikkaus Arena	12,523	9–7–1	19
18^{A}	November 14	Seattle	1–5	Carolina		Daccord	Veikkaus Arena	12,813	9–8–1	19
19	November 19	Vancouver	1–5	Seattle		Grubauer	Climate Pledge Arena	17,151	10–8–1	21
20	November 21	Seattle	–	San Jose			SAP Center
21	November 23	Anaheim	–	Seattle			Climate Pledge Arena
22	November 25	Chicago	–	Seattle			Climate Pledge Arena
23	November 27	Seattle	–	Edmonton			Rogers Place
24	November 28	Edmonton	–	Seattle			Climate Pledge Arena

December: 0–0–0 (home: 0–0–0; road: 0–0–0)
#	Date	Visitor	Score	Home	OT	Decision	Location	Attendance	Record	Pts	Recap
25	December 1	Dallas	–	Seattle			Climate Pledge Arena
26	December 3	Dallas	–	Seattle			Climate Pledge Arena
27	December 4	Seattle	–	Anaheim			Honda Center
28	December 6	Buffalo	–	Seattle			Climate Pledge Arena
29	December 8	Seattle	–	San Jose			SAP Center
30	December 10	Washington	–	Seattle			Climate Pledge Arena
31	December 12	Nashville	–	Seattle			Climate Pledge Arena
32	December 15	Seattle	–	Nashville			Bridgestone Arena
33	December 17	Seattle	–	Columbus			Nationwide Arena
34	December 18	Seattle	–	Pittsburgh			PPG Paints Arena
35	December 20	Seattle	–	Colorado			Ball Arena
36	December 22	San Jose	–	Seattle			Climate Pledge Arena
37	December 29	Philadelphia	–	Seattle			Climate Pledge Arena
38	December 30	Seattle	–	Vancouver			Rogers Arena

January: 0–0–0 (home: 0–0–0; road: 0–0–0)
#	Date	Visitor	Score	Home	OT	Decision	Location	Attendance	Record	Pts	Recap
39	January 2	NY Islanders	–	Seattle			Climate Pledge Arena
40	January 3	Vancouver	–	Seattle			Climate Pledge Arena
41	January 5	Tampa Bay	–	Seattle			Climate Pledge Arena
42	January 8	Seattle	–	Colorado			Ball Arena
43	January 9	Seattle	–	Vegas			T-Mobile Arena
44	January 12	Florida	–	Seattle			Climate Pledge Arena
45	January 14	Seattle	–	Vancouver			Rogers Arena
46	January 16	San Jose	–	Seattle			Climate Pledge Arena
47	January 18	Columbus	–	Seattle			Climate Pledge Arena
48	January 19	Seattle	–	Los Angeles			Crypto.com Arena
49	January 21	Seattle	–	Buffalo			KeyBank Center
50	January 23	Seattle	–	NY Islanders			UBS Arena
51	January 25	Seattle	–	NY Rangers			Madison Square Garden
52	January 26	Seattle	–	New Jersey			Prudential Center
53	January 28	Seattle	–	Minnesota			Grand Casino Arena
54	January 31	New Jersey	–	Seattle			Climate Pledge Arena

February: 0–0–0 (home: 0–0–0; road: 0–0–0)
#	Date	Visitor	Score	Home	OT	Decision	Location	Attendance	Record	Pts	Recap
55	February 3	Montreal	–	Seattle			Climate Pledge Arena
56	February 13	St. Louis	–	Seattle			Climate Pledge Arena
57	February 15	Pittsburgh	–	Seattle			Climate Pledge Arena
58	February 17	Ottawa	–	Seattle			Climate Pledge Arena
59	February 19	Seattle	–	Utah			Delta Center
60	February 20	Seattle	–	Los Angeles			Crypto.com Arena
61	February 22	Boston	–	Seattle			Climate Pledge Arena
62	February 24	Seattle	–	Anaheim			Honda Center
63	February 27	Winnipeg	–	Seattle			Climate Pledge Arena

March: 0–0–0 (home: 0–0–0; road: 0–0–0)
#	Date	Visitor	Score	Home	OT	Decision	Location	Attendance	Record	Pts	Recap
64	March 1	Seattle	–	Winnipeg			Canada Life Centre
65	March 3	Seattle	–	Toronto			Scotiabank Arena
66	March 4	Seattle	–	Montreal			Bell Centre
67	March 6	Seattle	–	Ottawa			Canadian Tire Centre
68	March 8	Seattle	–	Boston			TD Garden
69	March 11	Los Angeles	–	Seattle			Climate Pledge Arena
70	March 13	Edmonton	–	Seattle			Climate Pledge Arena
71	March 15	St. Louis	–	Seattle			Climate Pledge Arena
72	March 17	Seattle	–	Vegas			T-Mobile Arena
73	March 19	Colorado	–	Seattle			Climate Pledge Arena
74	March 21	Los Angeles	–	Seattle			Climate Pledge Arena
75	March 23	Vegas	–	Seattle			Climate Pledge Arena
76	March 25	Anaheim	–	Seattle			Climate Pledge Arena
77	March 27	Seattle	–	Minnesota			Grand Casino Arena
78	March 28	Seattle	–	Chicago			United Center
79	March 30	Utah	–	Seattle			Climate Pledge Arena

April: 0–0–0 (home: 0–0–0; road: 0–0–0)
#	Date	Visitor	Score	Home	OT	Decision	Location	Attendance	Record	Pts	Recap
80	April 3	Winnipeg	–	Seattle			Climate Pledge Arena
81	April 5	Seattle	–	Dallas			American Airlines Center
82	April 6	Seattle	–	Nashville			Bridgestone Arena
83	April 8	Seattle	–	St. Louis			Enterprise Center
84	April 10	Seattle	–	Chicago			United Center

Legend: Win (2 points) Loss (0 points) OT/SO loss (1 point)
Notes:
^{A} – Game played at Veikkaus Arena in Helsinki, Finland

== Roster ==
Updated November 2, 2026

No.	Nat	Player	Pos	S/G	Age	Acquired	Birthplace
10	(United States)	Matty Beniers (A)	C	L	24	2021	Hingham, Massachusetts
27	(Canada)	Berkly Catton	C	L	20	2024	Saskatoon, Saskatchewan
35	(United States)	Joey Daccord	G	L	30	2021	Boston, Massachusetts
42	(Canada)	Curtis Douglas	C	L	26	2026	Oakville, Ontario
29	(Canada)	Vince Dunn (A)	D	L	30	2021	Mississauga, Ontario
7	(Canada)	Jordan Eberle (C)	RW	R	36	2021	Regina, Saskatchewan
41	(Canada)	Ryker Evans	D	L	24	2021	Calgary, Alberta
8	(Canada)	Cale Fleury	D	R	28	2021	Carlyle, Saskatchewan
89	(Canada)	Frédérick Gaudreau	C	R	33	2025	Bromont, Quebec
31	(Germany)	Philipp Grubauer	G	L	34	2021	Rosenheim, Germany
84	(Finland)	Kaapo Kakko	RW	L	25	2024	Turku, Finland
6	(Sweden)	Adam Larsson (A)	D	R	34	2021	Skellefteå, Sweden
55	(United States)	Ryan Lindgren	D	L	28	2025	Minneapolis, Minnesota
28	(Canada)	Josh Mahura	D	L	28	2024	St. Albert, Alberta
19	(Canada)	Jared McCann	C	L	30	2021	Stratford, Ontario
74	(Canada)	Bobby McMann	C	L	30	2026	Wainwright, Alberta
63	(Canada)	Jacob Melanson	RW	R	23	2021	Amherst, Nova Scotia
59	(United States)	Ben Meyers	C	L	28	2024	Delano, Minnesota
62	(Canada)	Brandon Montour (A)	D	R	32	2024	Ohsweken, Ontario
38	(Finland)	Jani Nyman	RW	L	22	2022	Valkeakoski, Finland
46	(Finland)	Ville Ottavainen	D	L	24	2024	Oulu, Finland
11	(United States)	Mackie Samoskevich	RW	R	24	2026	Newtown, Connecticut
9	(Canada)	Chandler Stephenson	C	L	32	2024	Saskatoon, Saskatchewan
26	(Canada)	Ryan Winterton	C	R	23	2021	Markham, Ontario
71	(Canada)	Matthew Wood	RW	R	21	2026	Nanaimo, British Columbia

== Transactions ==
The Kraken have been involved in the following transactions during the 2026–27 season.

Italics indicate contract is a entry-level contract.

=== Trades ===
Date	Details		Ref
June 27, 2025	To New York Rangers 4th-round pick in 2026	To Seattle Kraken 5th-round pick in 2026; EDM 5th-round pick in 2026	
November 1, 2026	To Nashville Predators Shane Wright	To Seattle Kraken Matthew Wood	

=== Free agents acquired ===
Date	Player	Former team	Term	Ref
July 1, 2026	Curtis Douglas	Vancouver Canucks	2-year	

=== Free agents lost ===
Date	Player	New team	Ref
July 1, 2026	Jamie Oleksiak	Vancouver Canucks	
July 2, 2026	Jaden Schwartz	Colorado Avalanche	
July 8, 2026	Mitchell Stephens	Coachella Valley Firebirds (AHL)	

Lost via waivers

Date	Player	New team	Ref

=== Lost via retirement ===
Date	Player	Ref

=== Other signings ===
Date	Player	Term	Ref
July 1, 2026	Jon-Randall Avon	1-year	
July 1, 2026	Lleyton Roed	1-year	
July 1, 2026	Mackie Samoskevich	3-year	
July 10, 2026	Victor Östman	1-year	
July 10, 2026	Ville Ottavainen	1-year	

=== Other players lost ===
Date	Player	Term	Ref

== Draft picks ==
Below are the Seattle Kraken selections at the 2026 NHL entry draft, which was held on June 26 and 27, 2026, at the KeyBank Center in Buffalo, New York.

Round	#	Player	Pos	Nationality	College/Junior/Club (League)
1	7	Chase Reid	D	United States	Sault Ste. Marie Greyhounds (OHL)
2	38	Casey Mutryn	RW	United States	U.S. NTDP (USHL)
4	99 (Note: The New York Rangers' fourth-round pick went to the Seattle Kraken as the result of a trade on December 19, 2025, that sent Mason Marchment to Columbus in exchange for a second-round pick in 2027 and this pick.)	Viktor Fyodorov	C	Russia	Torpedo Nizhny Novgorod (KHL)
5	131 (Note: The New York Rangers' fifth-round pick went to the Seattle Kraken as the result of a trade on June 27, 2026, that sent a fourth-round pick (102nd overall) to New York in exchange for Edmonton's 2026 fifth-round pick (148th overall) and this pick.)	Finn Kearns	D	Canada	St. Andrews Saints (HS–ON)
5	148 (Note: The Edmonton Oilers' fifth-round pick went to the Seattle Kraken as the result of a trade on June 27, 2026, that sent a fourth-round pick (102nd overall) to New York in exchange for Edmonton's 2026 fifth-round pick (148th overall) and this pick.)	Hawke Huff	D	United States	Cedar Rapids RoughRiders (USHL)
6	166	Ola Palme	D	Sweden	Växjö Lakers (SHL)
7	198	Rylan Singh	D	Canada	Guelph Storm (OHL)
7	204 (Note: The New Jersey Devils' seventh-round pick went to the Seattle Kraken as the result of a trade on March 7, 2025, that sent Daniel Sprong to New Jersey in exchange for this pick.)	William Tomko	C	United States	Sioux City Musketeers (USHL)
