= 2026–27 Florida Panthers season =

National Hockey League season

2026–27 Florida Panthers
- Division: Atlantic
- Conference: Eastern
- 2026–27 record: 12–8–3
- Home record: 5–3–0
- Road record: 7–5–3
- Goals for: 72
- Goals against: 68

Team information
- General manager: Bill Zito
- Coach: Paul Maurice
- Captain: Aleksander Barkov
- Alternate captains: Aaron Ekblad; Matthew Tkachuk
- Arena: Amerant Bank Arena
- Minor league affiliates: Charlotte Checkers (AHL); Savannah Ghost Pirates (ECHL)

Team leaders
- Goals: Sam Reinhart (12)
- Assists: Matthew Tkachuk (25)
- Points: Matthew Tkachuk (32)
- Penalty minutes: Brady Tkachuk (56)
- Plus/minus: Lars Eller; Carter Verhaeghe (+9)
- Wins: Jacob Markström; Akira Schmid (6)
- Goals against average: Jacob Markström (2.56)

The 2026–27 Florida Panthers season is the 33rd season for the National Hockey League (NHL) franchise that was established in 1993.

== Standings ==
=== Divisional standings ===
Atlantic Division
Pos	Team	GP	W	L	OTL	RW	GF	GA	GD	Pts
1	Tampa Bay Lightning	21	14	5	2	12	79	61	+18	30
2	Ottawa Senators	22	14	6	2	11	70	62	+8	30
3	Montreal Canadiens	21	12	5	4	8	69	64	+5	28
4	Boston Bruins	21	13	7	1	10	72	55	+17	27
5	Florida Panthers	23	12	8	3	10	72	68	+4	27
6	Buffalo Sabres	21	8	9	4	6	58	74	−16	20
7	Detroit Red Wings	21	8	10	3	6	57	64	−7	19
8	Toronto Maple Leafs	23	8	13	2	7	72	82	−10	18

Updated to game(s) played on November 17, 2026. Source: National Hockey League
Rules for classification: 1) Fewer number of games played (GP, only during regular season); 2) Greater number of regulation wins (RW); 3) Greater number of wins in regulation and overtime, excluding shootout wins (ROW); 4) Greater number of total wins, including shootouts (W); 5) Greater number of points earned in head-to-head play; if teams played an uneven number of head-to-head games, the result of the first game on the home ice of the team with the extra home game is discarded; 6) Greater goal differential (GD); 7) Greater number of goals scored (GF)

=== Conference standings ===
Eastern Conference Wild Card
Pos	Div	Team	GP	W	L	OTL	RW	GF	GA	GD	Pts
1	AT	Boston Bruins	21	13	7	1	10	72	55	+17	27
2	AT	Florida Panthers	23	12	8	3	10	72	68	+4	27
3	ME	New York Islanders	20	10	6	4	8	65	57	+8	24
4	ME	Washington Capitals	19	10	9	0	8	64	70	−6	20
5	AT	Buffalo Sabres	21	8	9	4	6	58	74	−16	20
6	ME	Philadelphia Flyers	24	7	11	6	7	57	80	−23	20
7	AT	Detroit Red Wings	21	8	10	3	6	57	64	−7	19
8	AT	Toronto Maple Leafs	23	8	13	2	7	72	82	−10	18
9	ME	Pittsburgh Penguins	20	7	11	2	3	62	71	−9	16
10	ME	Columbus Blue Jackets	19	7	12	0	2	46	63	−17	14

Updated to game(s) played on November 17, 2026. Source: National Hockey League
Rules for classification: 1) Fewer number of games played (GP, only during regular season); 2) Greater number of regulation wins (RW); 3) Greater number of wins in regulation and overtime, excluding shootout wins (ROW); 4) Greater number of total wins, including shootouts (W); 5) Greater number of points earned in head-to-head play; if teams played an uneven number of head-to-head games, the result of the first game on the home ice of the team with the extra home game is discarded; 6) Greater goal differential (GD); 7) Greater number of goals scored (GF)

== Schedule and results ==
=== Preseason ===
The preseason schedule was published on June 24, 2026.

2026 preseason game log: 2–0–2 (Home: 1–0–1; Road: 1–0–1)
#	Date	Visitor	Score	Home	OT	Decision	Attendance	Record	Recap
1	September 20	Carolina	3–6	Florida		Markström	16,147	1–0–0
2	September 22	Florida	2–3	Carolina	SO	Schmid	13,200	1–0–1
3	September 24	Florida	5–3	Tampa Bay		Gerasimyuk	14,666	2–0–1
4	September 26	Tampa Bay	3–2	Florida	SO	Schmid	18,494	2–0–2

=== Regular season ===
The regular season schedule was published on July 16, 2026.

2026–27 game log

September: 1–0–0 (Home: 0–0–0; Road: 1–0–0)
#	Date	Visitor	Score	Home	OT	Decision	Attendance	Record	Pts	Recap
1	September 29	Florida	1–0	Carolina	OT	Markström	19,250	1–0–0	2

October: 7–4–2 (Home: 3–1–0; Road: 4–3–2)
#	Date	Visitor	Score	Home	OT	Decision	Attendance	Record	Pts	Recap
2	October 1	Florida	3–4	San Jose	OT	Schmid	17,435	1–0–1	3
3	October 4	Florida	2–3	Anaheim	OT	Markström	17,174	1–0–2	4
4	October 6	Florida	2–1	Los Angeles		Markström	18,145	2–0–2	6
5	October 10	Minnesota	4–1	Florida		Markström	19,856	2–1–2	6
6	October 12	Florida	3–5	Buffalo		Schmid	19,070	2–2–2	6
7	October 13	Florida	7–3	Columbus		Schmid	13,538	3–2–2	8
8	October 15	Vancouver	2–3	Florida	OT	Schmid	18,900	4–2–2	10
9	October 17	Seattle	3–8	Florida		Markström	19,169	5–2–2	12
10	October 21	Florida	1–5	Ottawa		Schmid	17,010	5–3–2	12
11	October 22	Florida	0–4	Pittsburgh		Black	14,898	5–4–2	12
12	October 25	Florida	3–2	Chicago		Schmid	18,117	6–4–2	14
13	October 27	Florida	5–1	Winnipeg		Schmid	14,336	7–4–2	16
14	October 30	Winnipeg	2–5	Florida		Schmid	19,656	8–4–2	18

November: 4–4–1 (Home: 2–2–0; Road: 2–2–1)
#	Date	Visitor	Score	Home	OT	Decision	Attendance	Record	Pts	Recap
15	November 2	Detroit	5–3	Florida		Markström	18,862	8–5–2	18
16	November 4	Chicago	3–5	Florida		Markström	19,482	9–5–2	20
17	November 7	Florida	3–4	Washington		Schmid	18,347	9–6–2	20
18	November 8	Florida	1–4	Boston		Markström	17,850	9–7–2	20
19	November 10	Florida	4–1	Columbus		Markström	14,134	10–7–2	22
20	November 12	Detroit	4–5	Florida		Schmid	19,151	11–7–2	24
21	November 14	Florida	4–1	St. Louis		Markström	18,096	12–7–2	26
22	November 15	Florida	1–2	Dallas	OT	Schmid	18,532	12–7–3	27
23	November 17	Edmonton	5–2	Florida		Markström	18,432	12–8–3	27
24	November 21	Buffalo	–	Florida
25	November 25	Ottawa	–	Florida
26	November 27	Florida	–	Washington
27	November 28	Tampa Bay	–	Florida

December: 0–0–0 (Home: 0–0–0; Road: 0–0–0)
#	Date	Visitor	Score	Home	OT	Decision	Attendance	Record	Pts	Recap
28	December 1	Florida	–	NY Islanders
29	December 3	Florida	–	Toronto
30	December 5	Florida	–	Montreal
31	December 8	Boston	–	Florida
32	December 10	Pittsburgh	–	Florida
33	December 12	Florida	–	Detroit
34	December 14	Florida	–	Philadelphia
35	December 15	Florida	–	Boston
36	December 19	Calgary	–	Florida
37	December 21	St. Louis	–	Florida
38	December 26	Tampa Bay	–	Florida
39	December 28	Nashville	–	Florida
40	December 30	Buffalo	–	Florida

January: 0–0–0 (Home: 0–0–0; Road: 0–0–0)
#	Date	Visitor	Score	Home	OT	Decision	Attendance	Record	Pts	Recap
41	January 1	Florida	–	Nashville
42	January 2	Montreal	–	Florida
43	January 5	Florida	–	Calgary
44	January 7	Florida	–	Edmonton
45	January 9	Florida	–	Vancouver
46	January 12	Florida	–	Seattle
47	January 14	Florida	–	Minnesota
48	January 16	Vegas	–	Florida
49	January 18	Ottawa	–	Florida
50	January 21	Carolina	–	Florida
51	January 24	Los Angeles	–	Florida
52	January 26	Florida	–	Philadelphia
53	January 27	Florida	–	NY Rangers
54	January 29	Florida	–	Detroit

February: 0–0–0 (Home: 0–0–0; Road: 0–0–0)
#	Date	Visitor	Score	Home	OT	Decision	Attendance	Record	Pts	Recap
55	February 1	NY Islanders	–	Florida
56	February 3	Washington	–	Florida
57	February 12	Colorado	–	Florida
58	February 13	Dallas	–	Florida
59	February 16	Florida	–	Tampa Bay
60	February 18	New Jersey	–	Florida
61	February 20	Anaheim	–	Florida
62	February 21	San Jose	–	Florida
63	February 24	Florida	–	Vegas
64	February 26	Florida	–	Utah
65	February 27	Florida	–	Colorado

March: 0–0–0 (Home: 0–0–0; Road: 0–0–0)
#	Date	Visitor	Score	Home	OT	Decision	Attendance	Record	Pts	Recap
66	March 2	Utah	–	Florida
67	March 4	Pittsburgh	–	Florida
68	March 6	Toronto	–	Florida
69	March 9	New Jersey	–	Florida
70	March 12	NY Islanders	–	Florida
71	March 15	Florida	–	Toronto
72	March 16	Florida	–	Montreal
73	March 18	Florida	–	Ottawa
74	March 20	Florida	–	Buffalo
75	March 23	Florida	–	Tampa Bay
76	March 25	NY Rangers	–	Florida
77	March 27	Philadelphia	–	Florida
78	March 30	Columbus	–	Florida

April: 0–0–0 (Home: 0–0–0; Road: 0–0–0)
#	Date	Visitor	Score	Home	OT	Decision	Attendance	Record	Pts	Recap
79	April 1	Toronto	–	Florida
80	April 3	Florida	–	NY Rangers
81	April 4	Florida	–	New Jersey
82	April 6	Montreal	–	Florida
83	April 9	Boston	–	Florida
84	April 10	Carolina	–	Florida

Legend: Win (2 points) Loss (0 points) Overtime/shootout loss (1 point)

== Roster ==
Updated October 20, 2026

No.	Nat	Player	Pos	S/G	Age	Acquired	Birthplace
26	(Latvia)	Uvis Balinskis	D	L	30	2023	Ventspils, Latvia
16	(Finland)	Aleksander Barkov (C)	C	L	31	2013	Tampere, Finland
9	(Canada)	Sam Bennett	C	L	30	2021	East Gwillimbury, Ontario
31	(United States)	Cooper Black	G	R	25	2026	Alpena, Michigan
5	(Canada)	Aaron Ekblad (A)	D	R	30	2014	Windsor, Ontario
20	(Denmark)	Lars Eller	C	L	37	2026	Rødovre, Denmark
42	(Sweden)	Gustav Forsling	D	L	30	2021	Linköping, Sweden
12	(Canada)	Jonah Gadjovich	LW	L	28	2023	Whitby, Ontario
6	(Czech Republic)	Radko Gudas	D	R	36	2026	Prague, Czechoslovakia
21	(United States)	Garnet Hathaway	RW	R	34	2026	Naples, Florida
14	(Canada)	Bokondji Imama	LW	L	30	2026	Montreal, Quebec
3	(United States)	Seth Jones	D	R	32	2025	Arlington, Texas
7	(Russia)	Dmitry Kulikov	D	L	36	2023	Lipetsk, Soviet Union
18	(United States)	Sam Lafferty	C	R	31	2026	Hollidaysburg, Pennsylvania
15	(Finland)	Anton Lundell	C	L	25	2020	Espoo, Finland
27	(Finland)	Eetu Luostarinen	C	L	28	2020	Siilinjärvi, Finland
63	(Canada)	Brad Marchand	LW	L	38	2025	Halifax, Nova Scotia
25	(Sweden)	Jacob Markström	G	L	36	2026	Gävle, Sweden
77	(Finland)	Niko Mikkola	D	L	30	2023	Kiiminki, Finland
13	(Canada)	Sam Reinhart	C	R	31	2021	North Vancouver, British Columbia
40	(Switzerland)	Akira Schmid	G	L	26	2026	Bern, Switzerland
8	(United States)	Brady Tkachuk	LW	L	27	2026	Scottsdale, Arizona
19	(United States)	Matthew Tkachuk (A)	LW	L	28	2022	Scottsdale, Arizona
23	(Canada)	Carter Verhaeghe	C	L	31	2020	Toronto, Ontario
95	(Latvia)	Sandis Vilmanis	LW	L	22	2024	Riga, Latvia

== Player statistics ==
=== Skaters ===
Regular season
Player	GP	G	A	Pts	+/−	PIM

=== Goaltenders ===
Regular season
Player	GP	GS	TOI	W	L	OT	GA	GAA	SA	SV%	SO	G	A	PIM

- ^{†}Denotes player spent time with another team before joining the Panthers. Stats reflect time with the Panthers only.
- ^{‡}Denotes player was traded mid-season. Stats reflect time with the Panthers only.
- Bold/italics denotes franchise record.

== Transactions ==
The Panthers have been involved in the following transactions during the 2026–27 season.

Key:

† Contract is entry-level.
‡ Contract initially takes effect in the 2027–28 season.

=== Trades ===
Date	Details	Ref

=== Players acquired ===
Date	Player	Former team	Term	Via	Ref
July 1, 2026	Alex Petrovic	Dallas Stars	2-year	Free agency	
July 1, 2026	Lars Eller	Ottawa Senators	1-year	Free agency	
July 1, 2026	John Beecher	Calgary Flames	1-year	Free agency	
July 1, 2026	Sam Lafferty	Chicago Blackhawks	1-year	Free agency	
July 1, 2026	Bokondji Imama	Pittsburgh Penguins	1-year	Free agency	
July 1, 2026	Casey Fitzgerald	New York Rangers	1-year	Free agency	

=== Players lost ===
Date	Player	New team	Term	Via	Ref
July 1, 2026	Michael Benning	Calgary Flames		Free agency	
July 1, 2026	Sergei Bobrovsky	Toronto Maple Leafs		Free agency	
July 1, 2026	Daniil Tarasov	Detroit Red Wings	1-year	Free agency	
July 1, 2026	Jack Studnicka	Philadelphia Flyers		Free agency	
July 1, 2026	Noah Gregor	Winnipeg Jets	1-year	Free agency	
July 1, 2026	Wilmer Skoog	Detroit Red Wings		Free agency	
July 1, 2026	Vinnie Hinostroza	Colorado Avalanche		Free agency	
August 19, 2026	Nolan Foote	Philadelphia Flyers	1-year	Free agency	

=== Signings ===
Date	Player	Term	Ref
July 1, 2026	Alex Petrovic	2-year	
July 1, 2026	Lars Eller	1-year	
July 1, 2026	John Beecher	1-year	
July 1, 2026	Sam Lafferty	1-year	
July 1, 2026	Bokondji Imama	1-year	
July 1, 2026	Casey Fitzgerald	1-year	

== Draft picks ==
Below are the Florida Panthers' selections at the 2026 NHL entry draft, which was held on June 26 and 27, 2026, at KeyBank Center in Buffalo, New York.

Round	#	Player	Pos	Nationality	Team (league)
2	40	Simas Ignatavičius	RW	Lithuania	Geneve-Servette HC (NL)
2	48 (Note: The Washington Capitals' second-round pick went to the Florida Panthers as the result of a trade on June 26, 2025, that sent Justin Sourdif to Washington in exchange for a sixth-round pick in 2027 and this pick.)	Ryder Cali	LW	Canada	North Bay Battalion (OHL)
4	98 (Note: The Chicago Blackhawks' fourth-round pick went to the Florida Panthers as the result of a trade on March 1, 2025, that sent Spencer Knight and a conditional first-round pick in 2026 to Chicago in exchange for Seth Jones and this pick.)	Jonas Kemps	D	United States	Chicago Steel (USHL)
6	168	Vilho Vanhatalo	RW	Finland	Tappara (Liiga)
6	181 (Note: The Philadelphia Flyers sixth-round pick went to the Florida Panthers as the result of a trade on June 25, 2026, that sent a fifth-round pick in 2026, and a fourth-round pick in 2027 to Philadelphia in exchange for Garnet Hathaway, and this pick.)	Cole Zurawski	RW	Canada	Owen Sound Attack (OHL)
7	217 (Note: The Minnesota Wild's seventh-round pick went to the Florida Panthers as the result of a trade on March 5, 2026, that sent Jeff Petry to Minnesota in exchange for this pick (being conditional at the time of the trade). The condition – Florida will receive Minnesota's seventh-round pick in 2026 if Minnesota fails to reach the 2026 Western Conference final, or if Petry fails to play in 50% of Minnesota's first and second-round playoff games – was converted when Petry was scratched from game three of Minnesota's second-round series against Colorado on May 9, mathematically eliminating him from playing 50% of Minnesota's first and second-round games.)	Louis-Antoine Denault	G	Canada	Newfoundland Regiment (QMJHL)
