= 2026–27 Philadelphia Flyers season =

National Hockey League season

2026–27 Philadelphia Flyers
- Division: Metropolitan
- Conference: Eastern
- 2026–27 record: 9–11–6
- Home record: 4–5–3
- Road record: 5–6–3
- Goals for: 67
- Goals against: 88

Team information
- General manager: Daniel Brière
- Coach: Rick Tocchet
- Captain: Sean Couturier
- Alternate captains: Travis Konecny; Travis Sanheim
- Arena: Xfinity Mobile Arena
- Minor league affiliates: Lehigh Valley Phantoms (AHL); Reading Royals (ECHL)

Team leaders
- Goals: Matvei Michkov (11)
- Assists: Jamie Drysdale (12)
- Points: Matvei Michkov (20)
- Penalty minutes: Trevor Zegras (30)
- Plus/minus: Nick Seeler (+5)
- Wins: Joseph Woll (5)
- Goals against average: Joseph Woll (3.08)

The 2026–27 Philadelphia Flyers season is the 60th season for the National Hockey League franchise that was established on June 5, 1967.

== Standings ==
=== Divisional standings ===
Metropolitan Division
Pos	Team	GP	W	L	OTL	RW	GF	GA	GD	Pts
1	Carolina Hurricanes	22	16	3	3	15	88	49	+39	35
2	New Jersey Devils	22	15	7	0	10	82	64	+18	30
3	New York Rangers	22	13	8	1	13	67	58	+9	27
4	New York Islanders	21	10	6	5	8	68	61	+7	25
5	Philadelphia Flyers	25	8	11	6	7	63	85	−22	22
6	Washington Capitals	20	10	10	0	8	67	76	−9	20
7	Columbus Blue Jackets	20	8	12	0	3	50	65	−15	16
8	Pittsburgh Penguins	21	7	12	2	3	64	76	−12	16

Updated to game(s) played on November 19, 2026. Source: National Hockey League
Rules for classification: 1) Fewer number of games played (GP, only during regular season); 2) Greater number of regulation wins (RW); 3) Greater number of wins in regulation and overtime, excluding shootout wins (ROW); 4) Greater number of total wins, including shootouts (W); 5) Greater number of points earned in head-to-head play; if teams played an uneven number of head-to-head games, the result of the first game on the home ice of the team with the extra home game is discarded; 6) Greater goal differential (GD); 7) Greater number of goals scored (GF)

=== Conference standings ===
Eastern Conference Wild Card
Pos	Div	Team	GP	W	L	OTL	RW	GF	GA	GD	Pts
1	AT	Boston Bruins	22	14	7	1	11	76	56	+20	29
2	AT	Florida Panthers	23	12	8	3	10	72	68	+4	27
3	ME	New York Islanders	21	10	6	5	8	68	61	+7	25
4	AT	Buffalo Sabres	22	9	9	4	7	64	77	−13	22
5	ME	Philadelphia Flyers	25	8	11	6	7	63	85	−22	22
6	ME	Washington Capitals	20	10	10	0	8	67	76	−9	20
7	AT	Detroit Red Wings	22	8	11	3	6	58	68	−10	19
8	AT	Toronto Maple Leafs	24	8	13	3	7	75	86	−11	19
9	ME	Columbus Blue Jackets	20	8	12	0	3	50	65	−15	16
10	ME	Pittsburgh Penguins	21	7	12	2	3	64	76	−12	16

Updated to game(s) played on November 19, 2026. Source: National Hockey League
Rules for classification: 1) Fewer number of games played (GP, only during regular season); 2) Greater number of regulation wins (RW); 3) Greater number of wins in regulation and overtime, excluding shootout wins (ROW); 4) Greater number of total wins, including shootouts (W); 5) Greater number of points earned in head-to-head play; if teams played an uneven number of head-to-head games, the result of the first game on the home ice of the team with the extra home game is discarded; 6) Greater goal differential (GD); 7) Greater number of goals scored (GF)

== Schedule and results ==
=== Preseason ===
The preseason schedule was announced on June 22, 2026.

2026 preseason game log: 1–3–0 (home: 1–1–0; road: 0–2–0)

Game	Date	Opponent	Score	OT	Decision	Location	Attendance	Record	Recap
1^{A}	September 21	@ Washington	2–5		Woll	Giant Center	10,281	0–1–0	L
2	September 22	@ Boston	1–5		Kolosov	TD Garden	17,850	0–2–0	L
3	September 24	Boston	2–0		Woll	Xfinity Mobile Arena	14,981	1–2–0	W
4	September 26	Washington	1–5		Kolosov	Xfinity Mobile Arena	17,339	1–3–0	L

Legend: Win Loss OT/SO loss ^{A} – Game played in Hershey, Pennsylvania

=== Regular season ===
The regular season schedule was announced on July 16, 2026.

2026–27 Game Log: 9–11–6 (home: 4–5–3; road: 5–6–3)
September: 0–1–0 (home: 0–1–0; road: 0–0–0)

Game	Date	Opponent	Score	OT	Decision	Location	Attendance	Record	Points	Recap
1	September 30	Pittsburgh	0–7		Vladař	Xfinity Mobile Arena	19,902	0–1–0	0	L

October: 3–7–4 (home: 2–2–3; road: 1–5–1)

Game	Date	Opponent	Score	OT	Decision	Location	Attendance	Record	Points	Recap
2	October 1	@ New Jersey	2–3	OT	Woll	Prudential Center	16,539	0–1–1	1	OTL
3	October 3	Carolina	2–3	OT	Woll	Xfinity Mobile Arena	18,194	0–1–2	2	OTL
4	October 5	@ Tampa Bay	1–4		Vladař	Benchmark International Arena	19,092	0–2–2	2	L
5	October 8	@ Ottawa	1–2		Woll	Canadian Tire Centre	17,501	0–3–2	2	L
6	October 10	@ Boston	1–5		Vladař	TD Garden	17,850	0–4–2	2	L
7	October 11	Carolina	1–4		Woll	Xfinity Mobile Arena	18,914	0–5–2	2	L
8	October 13	Seattle	2–3	SO	Vladař	Xfinity Mobile Arena	17,851	0–5–3	3	OTL
9	October 15	@ Detroit	1–2		Woll	Little Caesars Arena	17,551	0–6–3	3	L
10	October 17	Ottawa	3–1		Vladař	Xfinity Mobile Arena	18,953	1–6–3	5	W
11	October 19	Colorado	3–2		Woll	Xfinity Mobile Arena	18,353	2–6–3	7	W
12	October 21	@ Buffalo	3–1		Vladař	KeyBank Center	19,070	3–6–3	9	W
13	October 24	Anaheim	4–5		Woll	Xfinity Mobile Arena	19,336	3–7–3	9	L
14	October 27	Columbus	3–4	OT	Vladař	Xfinity Mobile Arena	18,469	3–7–4	10	OTL
15	October 28	@ Washington	2–5		Woll	Capital One Arena	17,391	3–8–4	10	L

November: 6–3–2 (home: 2–2–0; road: 4–1–2)

Game	Date	Opponent	Score	OT	Decision	Location	Attendance	Record	Points	Recap
16	November 1	Utah	6–3		Vladař	Xfinity Mobile Arena	18,378	4–8–4	12	W
17	November 3	Minnesota	2–4		Vladař	Xfinity Mobile Arena	17,889	4–9–4	12	L
18	November 5	@ NY Rangers	2–3		Woll	Madison Square Garden	18,006	4–10–4	12	L
19	November 8	@ Calgary	3–4	OT	Vladař	Scotiabank Saddledome	16,798	4–10–5	13	OTL
20	November 9	@ Vancouver	3–1		Woll	Rogers Arena	17,119	5–10–5	15	W
21	November 11	@ Edmonton	2–3	OT	Vladař	Rogers Place	18,347	5–10–6	16	OTL
22	November 14	@ Columbus	4–3		Woll	Nationwide Arena	15,819	6–10–6	18	W
23	November 15	Edmonton	2–5		Vladař	Xfinity Mobile Arena	18,903	6–11–6	18	L
24	November 17	Buffalo	4–3		Woll	Xfinity Mobile Arena	18,457	7–11–6	20	W
25	November 19	@ Ottawa	6–5	OT	Woll	Canadian Tire Centre	15,701	8–11–6	22	W
26	November 21	@ Montreal	4–3		Vladař	Bell Centre	20,962	9–11–6	24	W
27	November 25	@ Washington	–			Capital One Arena		0–0–0		
28	November 27	Vancouver	–			Xfinity Mobile Arena		0–0–0		
29	November 28	NY Islanders	–			Xfinity Mobile Arena		0–0–0		
30	November 30	@ Toronto	–			Scotiabank Arena		0–0–0		

December: 0–0–0 (home: 0–0–0; road: 0–0–0)

Game	Date	Opponent	Score	OT	Decision	Location	Attendance	Record	Points	Recap
31	December 3	NY Islanders	–			Xfinity Mobile Arena		0–0–0		
32	December 5	@ Minnesota	–			Grand Casino Arena		0–0–0		
33	December 8	@ Winnipeg	–			Canada Life Centre		0–0–0		
34	December 11	Calgary	–			Xfinity Mobile Arena		0–0–0		
35	December 14	Florida	–			Xfinity Mobile Arena		0–0–0		
36	December 16	NY Rangers	–			Xfinity Mobile Arena		0–0–0		
37	December 18	Detroit	–			Xfinity Mobile Arena		0–0–0		
38	December 20	@ Boston	–			TD Garden		0–0–0		
39	December 21	Columbus	–			Xfinity Mobile Arena		0–0–0		
40	December 27	@ Chicago	–			United Center		0–0–0		
41	December 29	@ Seattle	–			Climate Pledge Arena		0–0–0		

January: 0–0–0 (home: 0–0–0; road: 0–0–0)

Game	Date	Opponent	Score	OT	Decision	Location	Attendance	Record	Points	Recap
42	January 1	@ San Jose	–			SAP Center		0–0–0		
43	January 3	@ Anaheim	–			Honda Center		0–0–0		
44	January 4	@ Los Angeles	–			Crypto.com Arena		0–0–0		
45	January 7	Toronto	–			Xfinity Mobile Arena		0–0–0		
46	January 9	@ Toronto	–			Scotiabank Arena		0–0–0		
47	January 10	Chicago	–			Xfinity Mobile Arena		0–0–0		
48	January 12	@ Nashville	–			Bridgestone Arena		0–0–0		
49	January 15	@ Carolina	–			Lenovo Center		0–0–0		
50	January 16	Montreal	–			Xfinity Mobile Arena		0–0–0		
51	January 19	@ NY Rangers	–			Madison Square Garden		0–0–0		
52	January 21	Nashville	–			Xfinity Mobile Arena		0–0–0		
53	January 23	New Jersey	–			Xfinity Mobile Arena		0–0–0		
54	January 26	Florida	–			Xfinity Mobile Arena		0–0–0		
55	January 28	Los Angeles	–			Xfinity Mobile Arena		0–0–0		
56	January 30	Winnipeg	–			Xfinity Mobile Arena		0–0–0		
57	January 31	@ Pittsburgh	–			PPG Paints Arena		0–0–0		

February: 0–0–0 (home: 0–0–0; road: 0–0–0)

Game	Date	Opponent	Score	OT	Decision	Location	Attendance	Record	Points	Recap
58	February 3	Tampa Bay	–			Xfinity Mobile Arena		0–0–0		
59	February 13	New Jersey	–			Xfinity Mobile Arena		0–0–0		
60	February 15	@ St. Louis	–			Enterprise Center		0–0–0		
61	February 18	@ Dallas	–			American Airlines Center		0–0–0		
62	February 20	NY Rangers	–			Xfinity Mobile Arena		0–0–0		
63	February 22	Montreal	–			Xfinity Mobile Arena		0–0–0		
64	February 24	Buffalo	–			Xfinity Mobile Arena		0–0–0		
65	February 26	@ NY Islanders	–			UBS Arena		0–0–0		
66	February 27	San Jose	–			Xfinity Mobile Arena		0–0–0		

March: 0–0–0 (home: 0–0–0; road: 0–0–0)

Game	Date	Opponent	Score	OT	Decision	Location	Attendance	Record	Points	Recap
67	March 2	Vegas	–			Xfinity Mobile Arena		0–0–0		
68	March 5	Dallas	–			Xfinity Mobile Arena		0–0–0		
69	March 7	St. Louis	–			Xfinity Mobile Arena		0–0–0		
70	March 9	@ Colorado	–			Ball Arena		0–0–0		
71	March 11	@ Vegas	–			T-Mobile Arena		0–0–0		
72	March 13	@ Utah	–			Delta Center		0–0–0		
73	March 16	Detroit	–			Xfinity Mobile Arena		0–0–0		
74	March 18	Boston	–			Xfinity Mobile Arena		0–0–0		
75	March 20	@ NY Islanders	–			UBS Arena		0–0–0		
76	March 23	@ New Jersey	–			Prudential Center		0–0–0		
77	March 25	@ Tampa Bay	–			Benchmark International Arena		0–0–0		
78	March 27	@ Florida	–			Amerant Bank Arena		0–0–0		
79	March 30	Pittsburgh	–			Xfinity Mobile Arena		0–0–0		

April: 0–0–0 (home: 0–0–0; road: 0–0–0)

Game	Date	Opponent	Score	OT	Decision	Location	Attendance	Record	Points	Recap
80	April 1	Washington	–			Xfinity Mobile Arena		0–0–0		
81	April 3	@ Pittsburgh	–			PPG Paints Arena		0–0–0		
82	April 5	@ Carolina	–			Lenovo Center		0–0–0		
83	April 8	@ Columbus	–			Nationwide Arena		0–0–0		
84	April 10	Washington	–			Xfinity Mobile Arena		0–0–0		

Legend: Win Loss OT/SO loss

== Player Statistics ==
=== Skaters ===
Stats updated as of November 21, 2026

Regular season
Player	GP	G	A	Pts	+/−	PIM
Matvei Michkov	26	11	9	20	-12	8
Trevor Zegras	26	5	10	15	-12	30
Christian Dvorak	26	5	10	15	-1	6
Jamie Drysdale	26	3	12	15	+4	10
Denver Barkey	22	5	8	13	+3	6
Travis Konecny	16	3	8	11	-3	10
Tyson Foerster	25	5	5	10	0	12
Travis Sanheim	26	4	6	10	-8	12
Owen Tippett	20	4	5	9	-5	11
Noah Cates	26	4	5	9	0	6
Porter Martone	26	3	6	9	-2	26
Sean Couturier	26	1	8	9	-4	8
Oliver Bonk	19	1	6	7	-11	6
Nick Seeler	26	0	7	7	+5	14
Cole Knuble	13	4	1	5	-7	2
Noel Acciari	26	3	2	5	-4	8
Cam York	18	2	3	5	-8	2
Rasmus Ristolainen	10	2	2	4	-1	0
Michael Bunting	12	1	1	2	-6	6
Simon Benoit	15	1	0	1	-3	20
David Jiříček	10	0	1	1	-3	0
Garrett Wilson	2	0	0	0	-2	0
Carl Grundström	5	0	0	0	0	0
Jack Studnicka	3	0	0	0	-1	2
Jacob Gaucher	4	0	0	0	+1	6
Helge Grans	1	0	0	0	-1	0
Alex Bump	8	0	0	0	-1	0
Hunter McDonald	5	0	0	0	-2	10

=== Goaltenders ===
Stats updated as of November 21, 2026

Regular season
Player	GP	GS	TOI	W	L	OT	GA	GAA	SA	SV%	SO	G	A	P	PIM
Joseph Woll	13	13	778:15	5	6	2	40	3.08	372	.892	0	0	1	1	2
Daniel Vladař	13	13	784:42	4	5	4	43	3.29	340	.876	0	0	1	1	0

== Roster ==
Updated November 11, 2026

No.	Nat	Player	Pos	S/G	Age	Acquired	Birthplace
52	(United States)	Noel Acciari	C	R	34	2026	Johnston, Rhode Island
86	(Canada)	Denver Barkey	C	L	21	2023	Newmarket, Ontario
44	(Canada)	Simon Benoit	D	L	28	2026	Laval, Quebec
59	(Canada)	Oliver Bonk	D	R	21	2023	Ottawa, Ontario
58	(Canada)	Michael Bunting	LW	L	31	2026	Scarborough, Ontario
27	(United States)	Noah Cates	LW	L	27	2017	Stillwater, Minnesota
14	(Canada)	Sean Couturier (C)	C	L	33	2011	Phoenix, Arizona
9	(Canada)	Jamie Drysdale	D	R	24	2024	Toronto, Ontario
22	(United States)	Christian Dvorak	C	L	30	2025	Palos, Illinois
71	(Canada)	Tyson Foerster	RW	R	24	2020	Alliston, Ontario
17	(Russia)	Nikita Grebenkin	RW	L	23	2025	Serov, Russia
5	(Czech Republic)	David Jiříček	D	R	22	2026	Klatovy, Czech Republic
54	(United States)	Cole Knuble	RW	R	22	2023	Grand Rapids, Michigan
11	(Canada)	Travis Konecny (A)	RW	R	29	2015	London, Ontario
94	(Canada)	Porter Martone	RW	R	20	2025	Peterborough, Ontario
39	(Russia)	Matvei Michkov	RW	L	21	2023	Perm, Russia
55	(Finland)	Rasmus Ristolainen	D	R	32	2021	Turku, Finland
6	(Canada)	Travis Sanheim (A)	D	L	30	2014	Elkhorn, Manitoba
24	(United States)	Nick Seeler	D	L	33	2021	Eden Prairie, Minnesota
74	(Canada)	Owen Tippett	RW	R	27	2022	Peterborough, Ontario
80	(Czech Republic)	Daniel Vladař	G	L	29	2025	Prague, Czech Republic
53	(United States)	Joseph Woll	G	L	28	2026	Dardenne Prairie, Missouri
8	(United States)	Cam York	D	L	25	2019	Anaheim Hills, California
46	(United States)	Trevor Zegras	C	L	25	2025	Bedford, New York

== Transactions ==
The Flyers have been involved in the following transactions during the 2026–27 season.

Key:

† Contract is entry-level.
‡ Contract initially takes effect in the 2027–28 season.

=== Trades ===
Date	Details		Ref
June 25, 2026	To Florida Panthers Garnet Hathaway; 6th-round pick in 2026	To Philadelphia Flyers 5th-round pick in 2026; 4th-round pick in 2027	
June 26, 2026	To San Jose Sharks 1st-round pick in 2026	To Philadelphia Flyers Buffalo's 1st-round pick in 2026; Colorado's 2nd-round pick in 2026; Boston's 4th-round pick in 2026	
October 1, 2026	To Seattle Kraken Devin Kaplan	To Philadelphia Flyers David Goyette	

=== Players acquired ===
Date	Player	Former team	Term	Via	Ref
July 1, 2026	Noel Acciari	Pittsburgh Penguins	2-year	Free agency	
July 1, 2026	Zach Aston-Reese	Columbus Blue Jackets	2-year	Free agency	
July 1, 2026	Cam Dineen	Edmonton Oilers	2-year	Free agency	
July 1, 2026	Danila Klimovich	Vancouver Canucks	1-year	Free agency	
July 1, 2026	Jack Studnicka	Florida Panthers	2-year	Free agency	
August 19, 2026	Nolan Foote	Florida Panthers	1-year	Free agency	
October 6, 2026	Michael Bunting	Dallas Stars	1-year	Free agency	

=== Players lost ===
Date	Player	New team	Term	Via	Ref
July 1, 2026	Adam Ginning	Vegas Golden Knights	2-year	Free agency	
July 1, 2026	Maxence Guénette	Boston Bruins	1-year	Free agency	
July 1, 2026	Noah Juulsen	Colorado Avalanche	2-year	Free agency	
July 1, 2026	Christian Kyrou	Ottawa Senators	1-year	Free agency	
July 1, 2026	Lane Pederson	Los Angeles Kings	2-year	Free agency	
July 1, 2026	Philip Tomasino	Ottawa Senators	1-year	Free agency	
July 13, 2026	Rodrigo Ābols	SC Bern (NL)	3-year	Free agency	
August 6, 2026	Tucker Robertson	Bakersfield Condors (AHL)	1-year	Free agency	
August 13, 2026	Boris Katchouk	Traktor Chelyabinsk (KHL)	1-year	Free agency	
September 8, 2026	Artem Guryev	HC CSKA Moscow (KHL)	1-year	Free agency	
September 11, 2026	Karsen Dorwart	Charlotte Checkers (AHL)	1-year	Free agency	
September 25, 2026	Brett Harrison	Vaasan Sport (Liiga)	1-year	Free agency	
October 22, 2026	Luke Glendening	New York Rangers	1-year	Free agency	

=== Signings ===
Date	Player	Term	Ref
July 1, 2026	Tyson Foerster	8-year‡	
July 1, 2026	Carl Grundström	1-year	
July 1, 2026	Daniel Vladař	5-year‡	
July 15, 2026	Trevor Zegras	4-year	
July 17, 2026	Jamie Drysdale	4-year	
August 6, 2026	Nikita Grebenkin	2-year	
August 18, 2026	Hunter McDonald	2-year	
September 27, 2026	Garrett Wilson	1-year	

== Draft picks ==
Below are the Philadelphia Flyers' selections at the 2026 NHL entry draft, which was held on June 26 and 27, 2026, at the KeyBank Center in Buffalo, New York.

Round	#	Player	Pos	Nationality	Team (league)
1	27	Maksim Sokolovskii	Defense	Russia	London Knights (OHL)
2	53	Brek Liske	Defense	Canada	Everett Silvertips (WHL)
2	62	Martin Psohlavec	Goaltender	Czech Republic	Karlovy Vary Jr. (Czech)
4	120	Marek Sklenicka	Goaltender	Czech Republic	Seattle Thunderbirds (WHL)
5	136	KJ Sauer	Center	United States	Andover High School (HS-MN)
7	213	Max Laatikainen	Defense	Finland	Kiekko-Espoo Jr. (U20)
