= Filip Novák =

Filip Novák may refer to:

- Filip Novák (ice hockey) (born 1982), Czech hockey player
- Filip Novák (footballer) (born 1990), Czech footballer
