= 2026–27 Chicago Blackhawks season =

National Hockey League season

2026–27 Chicago Blackhawks
- Division: Central
- Conference: Western
- 2026–27 record: 6–13–2
- Home record: 6–5–1
- Road record: 0–8–1
- Goals for: 52
- Goals against: 86

Team information
- General manager: Kyle Davidson
- Coach: Jeff Blashill
- Captain: Connor Bedard
- Alternate captains: Tyler Bertuzzi; Patrick Kane
- Arena: United Center
- Minor league affiliates: Rockford IceHogs (AHL); Indy Fuel (ECHL)

Team leaders
- Goals: Frank Nazar (10)
- Assists: Connor Bedard; Sam Rinzel (11)
- Points: Connor Bedard (18)
- Penalty minutes: Frank Nazar (25)
- Plus/minus: Ian Cole (0)
- Wins: Spencer Knight (6)
- Goals against average: Spencer Knight (3.51)

The 2026–27 Chicago Blackhawks season is the 101st season (100th season of play) for the National Hockey League (NHL) franchise that was established on September 25, 1925. On September 15, 2026, Connor Bedard was named the 37th captain in franchise history.

== Standings ==
=== Divisional standings ===
Central Division
Pos	Team	GP	W	L	OTL	RW	GF	GA	GD	Pts
1	Minnesota Wild	23	16	3	4	15	83	51	+32	36
2	Dallas Stars	21	13	6	2	8	60	53	+7	28
3	Colorado Avalanche	21	12	6	3	12	85	64	+21	27
4	Nashville Predators	22	11	6	5	8	67	66	+1	27
5	Utah Mammoth	22	10	9	3	8	73	78	−5	23
6	Winnipeg Jets	22	10	9	3	8	67	74	−7	23
7	St. Louis Blues	21	10	9	2	8	63	65	−2	22
8	Chicago Blackhawks	21	6	13	2	4	52	86	−34	14

Updated to game(s) played on November 17, 2026. Source: National Hockey League
Rules for classification: 1) Fewer number of games played (GP, only during regular season); 2) Greater number of regulation wins (RW); 3) Greater number of wins in regulation and overtime, excluding shootout wins (ROW); 4) Greater number of total wins, including shootouts (W); 5) Greater number of points earned in head-to-head play; if teams played an uneven number of head-to-head games, the result of the first game on the home ice of the team with the extra home game is discarded; 6) Greater goal differential (GD); 7) Greater number of goals scored (GF)

=== Conference standings ===
Western Conference Wild Card
Pos	Div	Team	GP	W	L	OTL	RW	GF	GA	GD	Pts
1	CE	Nashville Predators	22	11	6	5	8	67	66	+1	27
2	CE	Utah Mammoth	22	10	9	3	8	73	78	−5	23
3	CE	Winnipeg Jets	22	10	9	3	8	67	74	−7	23
4	CE	St. Louis Blues	21	10	9	2	9	63	65	−2	22
5	PA	San Jose Sharks	24	10	12	2	3	65	86	−21	22
6	PA	Calgary Flames	22	10	11	1	9	56	76	−20	21
7	PA	Seattle Kraken	18	9	8	1	6	59	66	−7	19
8	PA	Los Angeles Kings	19	6	11	2	4	52	63	−11	14
9	CE	Chicago Blackhawks	21	6	13	2	4	52	86	−34	14
10	PA	Vancouver Canucks	23	5	17	1	3	66	100	−34	11

Updated to game(s) played on November 17, 2026. Source: National Hockey League
Rules for classification: 1) Fewer number of games played (GP, only during regular season); 2) Greater number of regulation wins (RW); 3) Greater number of wins in regulation and overtime, excluding shootout wins (ROW); 4) Greater number of total wins, including shootouts (W); 5) Greater number of points earned in head-to-head play; if teams played an uneven number of head-to-head games, the result of the first game on the home ice of the team with the extra home game is discarded; 6) Greater goal differential (GD); 7) Greater number of goals scored (GF)

== Schedule and results ==
=== Preseason ===
The Blackhawks preseason schedule was released on July 6, 2026.

2026 preseason game log: 2–1–1 (Home: 2–0–0; Road: 0–1–1)

#	Date	Visitor	Score	Home	OT	Decision	Arena	Attendance	Record	Recap
1	September 19	Chicago	2–3	Minnesota	OT	Söderblom	Grand Casino Arena	15,738	0–0–1	
2	September 21	Minnesota	3–4	Chicago	OT	Knight	United Center	10,605	1–0–1	
3	September 24	Chicago	0–1	St. Louis		Söderblom	Enterprise Center	16,615	1–1–1	
4	September 26	St. Louis	2–3	Chicago		Knight	United Center	10,497	2–1–1	

Legend:

Win Loss OT/SO Loss

=== Regular season ===
The Blackhawks regular season schedule was released July 16, 2026.

2026–27 game log
September: 0–1–0 (Home: 0–0–0; Road: 0–1–0)

#	Date	Visitor	Score	Home	OT	Decision	Attendance	Record	Points	Recap
1	September 29	Chicago	2–5	Vegas		Knight	17,838	0–1–0	0	

October: 4–8–1 (Home: 4–4–0; Road: 0–4–1)

#	Date	Visitor	Score	Home	OT	Decision	Attendance	Record	Points	Recap
2	October 1	Chicago	0–6	Utah		Söderblom	14,111	0–2–0	0	
3	October 3	Chicago	3–4	Buffalo		Knight	19,070	0–3–0	0	
4	October 6	St. Louis	2–4	Chicago		Knight	20,270	1–3–0	2	
5	October 8	Chicago	1–4	NY Islanders		Söderblom	13,946	1–4–0	2	
6	October 10	Carolina	5–2	Chicago		Knight	18,120	1–5–0	2	
7	October 13	Pittsburgh	3–5	Chicago		Knight	17,609	2–5–0	4	
8	October 15	Winnipeg	3–4	Chicago	OT	Knight	15,028	3–5–0	6	
9	October 17	Dallas	4–0	Chicago		Knight	18,233	3–6–0	6	
10	October 23	Montreal	4–1	Chicago		Knight	19,592	3–7–0	6	
11	October 25	Florida	3–2	Chicago		Knight	18,117	3–8–0	6	
12	October 27	Los Angeles	1–2	Chicago		Knight	16,437	4–8–0	8	
13	October 29	Chicago	1–4	Detroit		Knight	19,515	4–9–0	8	
14	October 31	Chicago	4–5	Boston	OT	Söderblom	17,850	4–9–1	9	

November: 2–4–1 (Home: 2–1–1; Road: 0–3–0)

#	Date	Visitor	Score	Home	OT	Decision	Attendance	Record	Points	Recap
15	November 2	Colorado	5–2	Chicago		Knight	17,838	4–10–1	9	
16	November 4	Chicago	3–5	Florida		Knight	19,482	4–11–1	9	
17	November 5	Chicago	1–4	Tampa Bay		Söderblom	19,092	4–12–1	9	
18	November 7	Chicago	2–9	Carolina		Knight	18,862	4–13–1	9	
19	November 12	Buffalo	2–3	Chicago	OT	Knight	18,305	5–13–1	11	
20	November 14	Winnipeg	5–4	Chicago	SO	Knight	18,451	5–13–2	12	
21	November 17	Toronto	3–6	Chicago		Knight	19,988	6–13–2	14	
22	November 19	Columbus	–	Chicago				0–0–0		
23	November 21	Chicago	–	Calgary				0–0–0		
24	November 22	Chicago	–	Vancouver				0–0–0		
25	November 25	Chicago	–	Seattle				0–0–0		
26	November 27	NY Rangers	–	Chicago				0–0–0		
27	November 29	Minnesota	–	Chicago				0–0–0		
28	November 30	Chicago	–	Winnipeg				0–0–0		

December: 0–0–0 (Home: 0–0–0; Road: 0–0–0)

#	Date	Visitor	Score	Home	OT	Decision	Attendance	Record	Points	Recap
29	December 3	Chicago	–	Nashville				0–0–0		
30	December 4	Chicago	–	St. Louis				0–0–0		
31	December 6	Edmonton	–	Chicago				0–0–0		
32	December 8	Chicago	–	Pittsburgh				0–0–0		
33	December 10	Chicago	–	Winnipeg				0–0–0		
34	December 12	Utah	–	Chicago				0–0–0		
35^{A}	December 18	Chicago	–	Ottawa				0–0–0		
36^{A}	December 20	Ottawa	–	Chicago				0–0–0		
37	December 27	Philadelphia	–	Chicago				0–0–0		
38	December 29	Vegas	–	Chicago				0–0–0		

January: 0–0–0 (Home: 0–0–0; Road: 0–0–0)

#	Date	Visitor	Score	Home	OT	Decision	Attendance	Record	Points	Recap
39	January 1	Boston	–	Chicago				0–0–0		
40	January 2	Chicago	–	Dallas				0–0–0		
41	January 4	Chicago	–	Montreal				0–0–0		
42	January 7	Chicago	–	NY Rangers				0–0–0		
43	January 9	Chicago	–	New Jersey				0–0–0		
44	January 10	Chicago	–	Philadelphia				0–0–0		
45	January 12	Utah	–	Chicago				0–0–0		
46	January 14	Chicago	–	Toronto				0–0–0		
47	January 16	Detroit	–	Chicago				0–0–0		
48	January 18	Calgary	–	Chicago				0–0–0		
49	January 20	Dallas	–	Chicago				0–0–0		
50	January 22	Vancouver	–	Chicago				0–0–0		
51	January 24	Vegas	–	Chicago				0–0–0		
52	January 26	Chicago	–	St. Louis				0–0–0		
53	January 28	Chicago	–	Anaheim				0–0–0		
54	January 30	Chicago	–	San Jose				0–0–0		

February: 0–0–0 (Home: 0–0–0; Road: 0–0–0)

#	Date	Visitor	Score	Home	OT	Decision	Attendance	Record	Points	Recap
55	February 10	Chicago	–	San Jose				0–0–0		
56	February 11	Chicago	–	Anaheim				0–0–0		
57	February 13	Chicago	–	Los Angeles				0–0–0		
58	February 17	St. Louis	–	Chicago				0–0–0		
59	February 20	Minnesota	–	Chicago				0–0–0		
60	February 21	New Jersey	–	Chicago				0–0–0		
61	February 23	NY Islanders	–	Chicago				0–0–0		
62	February 26	Los Angeles	–	Chicago				0–0–0		
63	February 28	Colorado	–	Chicago				0–0–0		

March: 0–0–0 (Home: 0–0–0; Road: 0–0–0)

#	Date	Visitor	Score	Home	OT	Decision	Attendance	Record	Points	Recap
64	March 1	Edmonton	–	Chicago				0–0–0		
65	March 3	Chicago	–	Vancouver				0–0–0		
66	March 5	Chicago	–	Calgary				0–0–0		
67	March 6	Chicago	–	Edmonton				0–0–0		
68	March 8	Tampa Bay	–	Chicago				0–0–0		
69	March 10	Washington	–	Chicago				0–0–0		
70	March 13	Chicago	–	Colorado				0–0–0		
71	March 14	Anaheim	–	Chicago				0–0–0		
72	March 16	San Jose	–	Chicago				0–0–0		
73	March 19	Chicago	–	Utah				0–0–0		
74	March 21	Chicago	–	Colorado				0–0–0		
75	March 23	Chicago	–	Minnesota				0–0–0		
76	March 25	Chicago	–	Columbus				0–0–0		
77	March 26	Nashville	–	Chicago				0–0–0		
78	March 28	Seattle	–	Chicago				0–0–0		
79	March 30	Chicago	–	Washington				0–0–0		

April: 0–0–0 (Home: 0–0–0; Road: 0–0–0)

#	Date	Visitor	Score	Home	OT	Decision	Attendance	Record	Points	Recap
80	April 1	Chicago	–	Nashville				0–0–0		
81	April 3	Chicago	–	Dallas				0–0–0		
82	April 6	Chicago	–	Minnesota				0–0–0		
83	April 8	Nashville	–	Chicago				0–0–0		
84	April 10	Seattle	–	Chicago				0–0–0		

Legend: Win (2 points) Loss (0 points) Overtime/shootout loss (1 point)

Notes:
^{A} Game played at PSD Bank Dome in Düsseldorf, Germany

== Roster ==
Updated November 15, 2026

No.	Nat	Player	Pos	S/G	Age	Acquired	Birthplace
98	(Canada)	Connor Bedard (C)	C	R	21	2023	North Vancouver, British Columbia
59	(Canada)	Tyler Bertuzzi (A)	LW	L	31	2024	Sudbury, Ontario
36	(Canada)	Dillon Boucher	LW	L	29	2026	Head of Chezzetcook, Nova Scotia
24	(Canada)	Bowen Byram	D	L	25	2026	Cranbrook, British Columbia
28	(United States)	Ian Cole	D	L	37	2026	Ann Arbor, Michigan
33	(United States)	Drew Commesso	G	L	24	2020	Norwell, Massachusetts
38	(Canada)	Ethan Del Mastro	D	L	23	2021	Burlington, Ontario
8	(United States)	Ryan Donato	C	L	30	2023	Scituate, Massachusetts
16	(Sweden)	Anton Frondell	C	L	19	2025	Trångsund, Sweden
20	(Canada)	Ryan Greene	C	R	23	2022	St. John's, Newfoundland and Labrador
12	(United States)	Jordan Greenway	LW	L	29	2026	Canton, New York
44	(United States)	Wyatt Kaiser	D	L	24	2020	Andover, Minnesota
88	(United States)	Patrick Kane (A)	RW	L	37	2026	Buffalo, New York
80	(Russia)	Roman Kantserov	RW	L	22	2023	Magnitogorsk, Russia
30	(United States)	Spencer Knight	G	L	25	2025	Darien, Connecticut
14	(Canada)	Kevin Korchinski	D	L	22	2022	Saskatoon, Saskatchewan
55	(Belarus)	Artyom Levshunov	D	R	21	2024	Zhlobin, Belarus
26	(Canada)	Andrew Mangiapane	LW	L	30	2026	Toronto, Ontario
11	(United States)	Oliver Moore	C	L	21	2023	Mounds View, Minnesota
91	(United States)	Frank Nazar	C	R	22	2022	Mount Clemens, Michigan
6	(United States)	Sam Rinzel	D	R	22	2022	Chanhassen, Minnesota
22	(United States)	Cole Smith	LW	L	31	2026	Brainerd, Minnesota
86	(Finland)	Teuvo Teräväinen	C	L	32	2024	Helsinki, Finland
72	(United States)	Alex Vlasic	D	L	25	2019	Wilmette, Illinois

== Transactions ==
The Blackhawks have been involved in the following transactions during the 2026-27 season.

=== Key ===
† Contract is entry-level.
‡ Contract initially takes effect in the 2027–28 season.

=== Trades ===
Date	Details	Ref

=== Players acquired ===
Date	Player	Former team	Term	Via	Ref
July 1, 2026	Cole Smith	Vegas Golden Knights	3 years	Free Agency	
July 1, 2026	Ian Cole	Utah Mammoth	1 year	Free Agency	
July 1, 2026	Connor Mackey	New York Rangers	2 years	Free Agency	
July 23, 2026	Patrick Kane	Detroit Red Wings	2 years	Free Agency	

=== Players lost ===
Date	Player	New team	Term	Via	Ref

=== Signings ===
Date	Player	Term	Ref
July 1, 2026	Bowen Byram	6-year	
July 18, 2026	Connor Bedard	5-year	

==== Key ====
† Contract is entry-level.

‡ Contract takes effect in the 2027–28 season.

== Draft picks ==
Below are the Chicago Blackhawks selections at the 2026 NHL entry draft, which was held on June 26 and 27, 2026, at the KeyBank Center in Buffalo, New York.

Round	#	Player	Pos	Nationality	College/Junior/Club team	League
2	34	Xavier Villeneuve	D	Canada	Blainville-Boisbriand Armada	QMJHL
2	35	Ryan Roobroeck	C	Canada	Niagara Ice Dogs	OHL
3	66	Samu Alalauri	D	Finland	Lahti Pelicans	U20 SM-sarja
7	194	Alexander Ivanov	D	Russia	Bars Kazan	VHL
7	200	William Sorbrand	C	Sweden	Timrå IK	SHL
