= 2026–27 Carolina Hurricanes season =

Season of play of professional ice hockey team

2026–27 Carolina Hurricanes
- Division: Metropolitan
- Conference: Eastern
- 2026–27 record: 17–3–3
- Home record: 8–1–2
- Road record: 9–2–1
- Goals for: 95
- Goals against: 53

Team information
- General manager: Eric Tulsky
- Coach: Rod Brind'Amour
- Captain: Jordan Staal
- Alternate captains: Sebastian Aho; Jordan Martinook; Jaccob Slavin
- Arena: Lenovo Center
- Minor league affiliates: Chicago Wolves (AHL); Greensboro Gargoyles (ECHL)

Team leaders
- Goals: Sebastian Aho; Andrei Svechnikov (13)
- Assists: Sebastian Aho (19)
- Points: Sebastian Aho (32)
- Penalty minutes: Sean Walker (20)
- Plus/minus: Logan Stankoven (+20)
- Wins: Pyotr Kochetkov (13)
- Goals against average: Pyotr Kochetkov (1.80)

The 2026–27 Carolina Hurricanes season is the 48th season (47th season of play) for the National Hockey League (NHL) franchise that was established in June 1979, and the 29th season since the franchise relocated from the Hartford Whalers to start the 1997–98 season. The Hurricanes entered the season as the defending Stanley Cup champions, having defeated the Vegas Golden Knights in six games in the 2026 Stanley Cup Final.

== Standings ==
=== Divisional standings ===
Metropolitan Division
Pos	Team	GP	W	L	OTL	RW	GF	GA	GD	Pts
1	Carolina Hurricanes	23	17	3	3	16	95	53	+42	37
2	New Jersey Devils	23	15	8	0	10	88	73	+15	30
3	New York Rangers	22	13	8	1	13	67	58	+9	27
4	New York Islanders	22	11	6	5	9	71	63	+8	27
5	Philadelphia Flyers	26	9	11	6	8	67	88	−21	24
6	Washington Capitals	21	10	11	0	8	72	83	−11	20
7	Columbus Blue Jackets	21	9	12	0	4	54	68	−14	18
8	Pittsburgh Penguins	22	7	13	2	3	67	80	−13	16

Updated to game(s) played on November 21, 2026. Source: National Hockey League
Rules for classification: 1) Fewer number of games played (GP, only during regular season); 2) Greater number of regulation wins (RW); 3) Greater number of wins in regulation and overtime, excluding shootout wins (ROW); 4) Greater number of total wins, including shootouts (W); 5) Greater number of points earned in head-to-head play; if teams played an uneven number of head-to-head games, the result of the first game on the home ice of the team with the extra home game is discarded; 6) Greater goal differential (GD); 7) Greater number of goals scored (GF)

=== Conference standings ===
Eastern Conference Wild Card
Pos	Div	Team	GP	W	L	OTL	RW	GF	GA	GD	Pts
1	AT	Boston Bruins	23	15	7	1	12	83	61	+22	31
2	AT	Florida Panthers	24	13	8	3	11	76	71	+5	29
3	ME	New York Islanders	22	11	6	5	9	71	63	+8	27
4	ME	Philadelphia Flyers	26	9	11	6	8	67	88	−21	24
5	AT	Buffalo Sabres	23	9	10	4	7	67	81	−14	22
6	ME	Washington Capitals	21	10	11	0	8	72	83	−11	20
7	AT	Detroit Red Wings	23	8	12	3	6	60	71	−11	19
8	AT	Toronto Maple Leafs	25	8	14	3	7	78	90	−12	19
9	ME	Columbus Blue Jackets	21	9	12	0	4	54	68	−14	18
10	ME	Pittsburgh Penguins	22	7	13	2	3	67	80	−13	16

Updated to game(s) played on November 21, 2026. Source: National Hockey League
Rules for classification: 1) Fewer number of games played (GP, only during regular season); 2) Greater number of regulation wins (RW); 3) Greater number of wins in regulation and overtime, excluding shootout wins (ROW); 4) Greater number of total wins, including shootouts (W); 5) Greater number of points earned in head-to-head play; if teams played an uneven number of head-to-head games, the result of the first game on the home ice of the team with the extra home game is discarded; 6) Greater goal differential (GD); 7) Greater number of goals scored (GF)

== Schedule and results ==
=== Preseason ===
The Carolina Hurricanes preseason schedule was released on June 26, 2026.

2026 preseason game log: 3–3–0 (Home: 2–2–0; Road: 1–1–0)

Game	Date	Opponent	Score	OT	Decision	Location	Attendance	Record	Recap
P1	September 13	Nashville	1–4		Khazheyev	Lane Arena	N/A	0–1–0	
P2	September 15	Tampa Bay	2–4		Jovanovski	Lane Arena	N/A	0–2–0	
1	September 20	@ Florida	3–6		Kochetkov	Amerant Bank Arena	16,147	0–3–0	
2	September 22	Florida	3–2	SO	Primeau	Lenovo Center	13,200	1–3–0	
3	September 24	Nashville	6–5		Kochetkov	First Horizon Coliseum	13,863	2–3–0	
4	September 26	@ Nashville	6–0		Bussi	Bridgestone Arena	17,286	3–3–0	

Win Loss Overtime/shootout loss

=== Regular season ===
The Carolina Hurricanes regular season schedule was released on July 16, 2026.

2026–27 game log
September: 0–0–1 (Home: 0–0–1; Road: 0–0–0)

Game	Date	Opponent	Score	OT	Decision	Location	Attendance	Record	Points	Recap
1	September 29	Florida	0–1	OT	Bussi (0–0–1)	Lenovo Center	19,250	0–0–1	1	

October: 11–2–1 (Home: 4–1–0; Road: 7–1–1)

Game	Date	Opponent	Score	OT	Decision	Location	Attendance	Record	Points	Recap
2	October 2	Washington	2–5		Bussi (0–1–1)	Lenovo Center	18,905	0–1–1	1	
3	October 3	@ Philadelphia	3–2	OT	Kochetkov (1–0–0)	Xfinity Mobile Arena	18,194	1–1–1	3	
4	October 6	@ Montreal	6–4		Bussi (1–1–1)	Bell Centre	20,962	2–1–1	5	
5	October 8	Vancouver	7–2		Kochetkov (2–0–0)	Lenovo Center	18,800	3–1–1	7	
6	October 10	@ Chicago	5–2		Bussi (2–1–1)	United Center	18,120	4–1–1	9	
7	October 11	@ Philadelphia	4–1		Kochetkov (3–0–0)	Xfinity Mobile Arena	18,914	5–1–1	11	
8	October 13	Washington	4–2		Kochetkov (4–0–0)	Lenovo Center	18,828	6–1–1	13	
9	October 17	@ Winnipeg	3–2		Kochetkov (5–0–0)	Canada Life Centre	14,415	7–1–1	15	
10	October 18	@ Calgary	2–3		Bussi (2–2–1)	Scotiabank Saddledome	16,464	7–2–1	15	
11	October 20	@ Vancouver	6–3		Kochetkov (6–0–0)	Rogers Arena	17,250	8–2–1	17	
12	October 22	@ Edmonton	5–6	SO	Bussi (2–2–2)	Rogers Place	16,420	8–2–2	18	
13	October 24	@ St. Louis	4–0		Kochetkov (7–0–0)	Enterprise Center	18,096	9–2–2	20	
14	October 27	Boston	2–1		Kochetkov (8–0–0)	Lenovo Center	18,811	10–2–2	22	
15	October 29	Columbus	3–2		Kochetkov (9–0–0)	Lenovo Center	18,800	11–2–2	24	

November: 7–1–1 (Home: 4–0–1; Road: 3–1–0)

Game	Date	Opponent	Score	OT	Decision	Location	Attendance	Record	Points	Recap
16	November 1	Winnipeg	7–0		Kochetkov (10–0–0)	Lenovo Center	18,818	12–2–2	26	
17	November 3	@ Nashville	1–4		Kochetkov (10–1–0)	Bridgestone Arena	17,159	12–3–2	26	
18	November 5	@ NY Islanders	5–3		Bussi (3–2–2)	UBS Arena	14,234	13–3–2	28	
19	November 7	Chicago	9–2		Kochetkov (11–1–0)	Lenovo Center	18,862	14–3–2	30	
20^{A}	November 12	@ Seattle	4–1		Bussi (4–2–2)	Veikkaus Arena	12,523	15–3–2	32	
21^{A}	November 14	Seattle	5–1		Kochetkov (12–1–0)	Veikkaus Arena	12,813	16–3–2	34	
22	November 19	Montreal	1–2	OT	Kochetkov (12–1–1)	Lenovo Center	18,838	16–3–3	35	
23	November 21	Edmonton	7–4		Kochetkov (13–1–1)	Lenovo Center	18,855	17–3–3	37	
24	November 22	@ NY Rangers	5–2		Bussi (5–2–2)	Madison Square Garden	18,006	18–3–3	39	
25	November 25	@ Tampa Bay	–			Benchmark International Arena				
26	November 28	Ottawa	–			Lenovo Center				
27	November 30	@ NY Rangers	–			Madison Square Garden				

December: 0–0–0 (Home: 0–0–0; Road: 0–0–0)

Game	Date	Opponent	Score	OT	Decision	Location	Attendance	Record	Points	Recap
28	December 3	Columbus	–			Lenovo Center				
29	December 5	Toronto	–			Lenovo Center				
30	December 8	NY Rangers	–			Lenovo Center				
31	December 11	NY Islanders	–			Lenovo Center				
32	December 13	Boston	–			Lenovo Center				
33	December 15	@ Columbus	–			Nationwide Arena				
34	December 17	@ Utah	–			Delta Center				
35	December 18	@ Colorado	–			Ball Arena				
36	December 21	@ Vegas	–			T-Mobile Arena				
37	December 26	Pittsburgh	–			Lenovo Center				
38	December 28	Tampa Bay	–			Lenovo Center				
39	December 29	@ Pittsburgh	–			PPG Paints Arena				
40	December 31	@ Detroit	–			Little Caesars Arena				

January: 0–0–0 (Home: 0–0–0; Road: 0–0–0)

Game	Date	Opponent	Score	OT	Decision	Location	Attendance	Record	Points	Recap
41	January 2	Nashville	–			Lenovo Center				
42	January 5	St. Louis	–			Lenovo Center				
43	January 7	Pittsburgh	–			Lenovo Center				
44	January 9	@ Buffalo	–			KeyBank Center				
45	January 12	@ Boston	–			TD Garden				
46	January 14	@ Washington	–			Capital One Arena				
47	January 15	Philadelphia	–			Lenovo Center				
48	January 17	Vegas	–			Lenovo Center				
49	January 21	@ Florida	–			Amerant Bank Arena				
50	January 23	Anaheim	–			Lenovo Center				
51	January 25	@ Ottawa	–			Canadian Tire Centre				
52	January 26	@ Montreal	–			Bell Centre				
53	January 28	NY Islanders	–			Lenovo Center				
54	January 30	Los Angeles	–			Lenovo Center				

February: 0–0–0 (Home: 0–0–0; Road: 0–0–0)

Game	Date	Opponent	Score	OT	Decision	Location	Attendance	Record	Points	Recap
55	February 9	Colorado	–			Lenovo Center				
56	February 11	Minnesota	–			Lenovo Center				
57	February 13	Buffalo	–			Lenovo Center				
58	February 16	@ Toronto	–			Scotiabank Arena				
59	February 18	@ Buffalo	–			KeyBank Center				
60	February 19	Detroit	–			Lenovo Center				
61	February 21	NY Rangers	–			Lenovo Center				
62	February 23	@ New Jersey	–			Prudential Center				
63	February 25	San Jose	–			Lenovo Center				
64	February 27	Tampa Bay	–			Lenovo Center				

March: 0–0–0 (Home: 0–0–0; Road: 0–0–0)

Game	Date	Opponent	Score	OT	Decision	Location	Attendance	Record	Points	Recap
65	March 1	@ Columbus	–			Nationwide Arena				
66	March 3	@ Washington	–			Capital One Arena				
67	March 5	Toronto	–			Lenovo Center				
68	March 7	Utah	–			Lenovo Center				
69	March 9	@ Minnesota	–			Grand Casino Arena				
70	March 12	Calgary	–			Lenovo Center				
71	March 13	New Jersey	–			Lenovo Center				
72	March 16	@ Anaheim	–			Honda Center				
73	March 18	@ Los Angeles	–			Crypto.com Arena				
74	March 20	@ San Jose	–			SAP Center				
75	March 23	@ Dallas	–			American Airlines Center				
76	March 25	Dallas	–			Lenovo Center				
77	March 27	@ Pittsburgh	–			PPG Paints Arena				
78	March 29	@ New Jersey	–			Prudential Center				
79	March 30	@ NY Islanders	–			UBS Arena				

April: 0–0–0 (Home: 0–0–0; Road: 0–0–0)

Game	Date	Opponent	Score	OT	Decision	Location	Attendance	Record	Points	Recap
80	April 2	@ Detroit	–			Little Caesars Arena				
81	April 3	New Jersey	–			Lenovo Center				
82	April 5	Philadelphia	–			Lenovo Center				
83	April 7	Ottawa	–			Lenovo Center				
84	April 10	@ Florida	–			Amerant Bank Arena				

Win (2 points) Loss (0 points) Overtime/shootout loss (1 point)
Notes:
^{A} – Game played at Veikkaus Arena in Helsinki, Finland

== Roster ==
Updated November 15, 2026

No.	Nat	Player	Pos	S/G	Age	Acquired	Birthplace
20	(Finland)	Sebastian Aho (A)	C	L	29	2015	Rauma, Finland
53	(United States)	Jackson Blake	RW	R	23	2021	Fargo, North Dakota
32	(United States)	Brandon Bussi	G	R	28	2025	Sound Beach, New York
28	(Canada)	William Carrier	LW	L	31	2024	LaSalle, Quebec
5	(United States)	Jalen Chatfield	D	R	30	2021	Ypsilanti, Michigan
44	(Canada)	Nicolas Deslauriers	LW	L	35	2026	LaSalle, Quebec
27	(Denmark)	Nikolaj Ehlers	LW	L	30	2025	Aalborg, Denmark
4	(United States)	Shayne Gostisbehere	D	L	33	2024	Pembroke Pines, Florida
71	(Canada)	Taylor Hall	LW	L	35	2025	Calgary, Alberta
77	(Canada)	Mark Jankowski	C	L	32	2025	Hamilton, Ontario
24	(Canada)	Seth Jarvis	RW	R	24	2020	Winnipeg, Manitoba
52	(Russia)	Pyotr Kochetkov	G	L	27	2019	Penza, Russia
82	(Finland)	Jesperi Kotkaniemi	C	L	26	2021	Pori, Finland
48	(Canada)	Jordan Martinook (A)	LW	L	34	2018	Brandon, Manitoba
19	(United States)	K'Andre Miller	D	L	26	2025	Saint Paul, Minnesota
21	(Russia)	Alexander Nikishin	D	L	25	2020	Oryol, Russia
50	(United States)	Eric Robinson	LW	L	31	2024	Bellmawr, New Jersey
74	(United States)	Jaccob Slavin (A)	D	L	32	2012	Erie, Colorado
11	(Canada)	Jordan Staal (C)	C	L	38	2012	Thunder Bay, Ontario
22	(Canada)	Logan Stankoven	C	R	23	2025	Kamloops, British Columbia
37	(Russia)	Andrei Svechnikov	RW	L	26	2018	Barnaul, Russia
8	(Finland)	Juuso Välimäki	D	L	28	2026	Tampere, Finland
26	(Canada)	Sean Walker	D	R	32	2024	Keswick, Ontario

== Transactions ==
The Hurricanes have been involved in the following transactions during the 2026–27 season.

Key:

† Contract is entry-level.
‡ Contract initially takes effect in the 2027–28 season.

=== Trades ===
Date	Details		Ref
August 17, 2026	To Buffalo Sabres Future considerations (Note: Considerations unknown.)	To Carolina Hurricanes Stiven Sardarian	

=== Players acquired ===
Date	Player	Former team	Term	Via	Ref
July 4, 2026	Zach Sawchenko	Columbus Blue Jackets	1-year	Free agency	

=== Players lost ===
Date	Player	New team	Term	Via	Ref
July 1, 2026	Domenick Fensore	Colorado Avalanche		Free agency	
July 1, 2026	Ryan Suzuki	Ottawa Senators		Free agency	
July 1, 2026	Frederik Andersen	Edmonton Oilers	1-year	Free agency	

=== Signings ===
Date	Player	Term	Ref
July 4, 2026	Zach Sawchenko	1-year	

== Draft picks ==
Below are the Carolina Hurricanes selections at the 2026 NHL entry draft, which was held on June 26 and 27, 2026, at KeyBank Center in Buffalo, New York.

Round	#	Player	Pos	Nationality	College/Junior/Club team (League)
2	51	William Hakansson	D	Sweden	Lulea HF (SHL)
2	61	Wiggo Sorensson	D	Sweden	Boro/Vetlanda HC (HockeyEttan)
3	68	Zachary Lansard	RW	Canada	Regina Pats (WHL)
4	105	Michael Berchild	LW	United States	U.S. NTDP (USHL)
4	125	Ryder Fetterolf	G	United States	Ottawa 67's (OHL)
6	165	Zachary Jovanoski	G	Canada	Guelph Storm (OHL)
