= 2026–27 St. Louis Blues season =

National Hockey League season

2026–27 St. Louis Blues
- Division: Central
- Conference: Western
- 2026–27 record: 10–9–2
- Home record: 6–3–1
- Road record: 4–6–1
- Goals for: 63
- Goals against: 65

Team information
- General manager: Alexander Steen
- Coach: Jim Montgomery
- Captain: Robert Thomas
- Alternate captains: Philip Broberg; Dylan Holloway; Jake Neighbours; Colton Parayko
- Minor league affiliates: Springfield Thunderbirds (AHL); Worcester Railers (ECHL)

Team leaders
- Goals: Jimmy Snuggerud (10)
- Assists: Robert Thomas (13)
- Points: Robert Thomas (17)
- Penalty minutes: Brandon Carlo (23)
- Plus/minus: Four players (+3)
- Wins: Joel Hofer (8)
- Goals against average: Joel Hofer (2.28)

The 2026–27 St. Louis Blues season is the 60th season for the National Hockey League franchise that was established in 1967.

== Standings ==
=== Divisional standings ===
Central Division
| Pos | Team | GP | W | L | OTL | RW | GF | GA | GD | Pts |
|---|---|---|---|---|---|---|---|---|---|---|
| 1 | Minnesota Wild | 23 | 16 | 3 | 4 | 15 | 83 | 51 | +32 | 36 |
| 2 | Dallas Stars | 21 | 13 | 6 | 2 | 8 | 60 | 53 | +7 | 28 |
| 3 | Colorado Avalanche | 22 | 12 | 7 | 3 | 12 | 86 | 68 | +18 | 27 |
| 4 | Nashville Predators | 22 | 11 | 6 | 5 | 8 | 67 | 66 | +1 | 27 |
| 5 | Utah Mammoth | 23 | 11 | 9 | 3 | 9 | 77 | 79 | −2 | 25 |
| 6 | Winnipeg Jets | 22 | 10 | 9 | 3 | 8 | 67 | 74 | −7 | 23 |
| 7 | St. Louis Blues | 21 | 10 | 9 | 2 | 8 | 63 | 65 | −2 | 22 |
| 8 | Chicago Blackhawks | 21 | 6 | 13 | 2 | 4 | 52 | 86 | −34 | 14 |

Updated to game(s) played on November 18, 2026. Source: National Hockey League
Rules for classification: 1) Fewer number of games played (GP, only during regular season); 2) Greater number of regulation wins (RW); 3) Greater number of wins in regulation and overtime, excluding shootout wins (ROW); 4) Greater number of total wins, including shootouts (W); 5) Greater number of points earned in head-to-head play; if teams played an uneven number of head-to-head games, the result of the first game on the home ice of the team with the extra home game is discarded; 6) Greater goal differential (GD); 7) Greater number of goals scored (GF)

=== Conference standings ===
Western Conference Wild Card
| Pos | Div | Team | GP | W | L | OTL | RW | GF | GA | GD | Pts |
|---|---|---|---|---|---|---|---|---|---|---|---|
| 1 | CE | Nashville Predators | 22 | 11 | 6 | 5 | 8 | 67 | 66 | +1 | 27 |
| 2 | CE | Utah Mammoth | 23 | 11 | 9 | 3 | 9 | 77 | 79 | −2 | 25 |
| 3 | CE | Winnipeg Jets | 22 | 10 | 9 | 3 | 8 | 67 | 74 | −7 | 23 |
| 4 | CE | St. Louis Blues | 21 | 10 | 9 | 2 | 9 | 63 | 65 | −2 | 22 |
| 5 | PA | San Jose Sharks | 24 | 10 | 12 | 2 | 3 | 65 | 86 | −21 | 22 |
| 6 | PA | Calgary Flames | 22 | 10 | 11 | 1 | 9 | 56 | 76 | −20 | 21 |
| 7 | PA | Seattle Kraken | 18 | 9 | 8 | 1 | 6 | 59 | 66 | −7 | 19 |
| 8 | PA | Los Angeles Kings | 19 | 6 | 11 | 2 | 4 | 52 | 63 | −11 | 14 |
| 9 | CE | Chicago Blackhawks | 21 | 6 | 13 | 2 | 4 | 52 | 86 | −34 | 14 |
| 10 | PA | Vancouver Canucks | 23 | 5 | 17 | 1 | 3 | 66 | 100 | −34 | 11 |

Updated to game(s) played on November 18, 2026. Source: National Hockey League
Rules for classification: 1) Fewer number of games played (GP, only during regular season); 2) Greater number of regulation wins (RW); 3) Greater number of wins in regulation and overtime, excluding shootout wins (ROW); 4) Greater number of total wins, including shootouts (W); 5) Greater number of points earned in head-to-head play; if teams played an uneven number of head-to-head games, the result of the first game on the home ice of the team with the extra home game is discarded; 6) Greater goal differential (GD); 7) Greater number of goals scored (GF)

== Schedule and results ==
=== Preseason ===
The Blues preseason schedule was released on July 6, 2026.

2026 preseason game log: 1–3–0 (home: 1–1–0; road: 0–2–0)
| # | Date | Visitor | Score | Home | OT | Decision | Location | Attendance | Record | Recap |
|---|---|---|---|---|---|---|---|---|---|---|
| 1 | September 19 | Dallas | 2–1 | St. Louis | | Binnington | Enterprise Center | 16,314 | 0–1–0 |
| 2 | September 21 | St. Louis | 1–2 | Dallas | | Romanov | American Airlines Center | 14,614 | 0–2–0 |
| 3 | September 24 | Chicago | 0–1 | St. Louis | | Binnington | Enterprise Center | 16,615 | 1–2–0 |
| 4 | September 26 | St. Louis | 2–3 | Chicago | | Hofer | United Center | 10,497 | 1–3–0 |
Legend: Win Loss OT/SO Loss

=== Regular season ===
The regular season schedule was published on July 16, 2026.

2026–27 game log

October: 7–6–1 (home: 4–2–1; road: 3–4–0)
| # | Date | Visitor | Score | Home | OT | Decision | Location | Attendance | Record | Pts | Recap |
|---|---|---|---|---|---|---|---|---|---|---|---|
| 1 | October 2 | St. Louis | 4–0 | Dallas | | Hofer | American Airlines Center | 18,532 | 1–0–0 | 2 |
| 2 | October 3 | St. Louis | 1–6 | Colorado | | Binnington | Ball Arena | 18,087 | 1–1–0 | 2 |
| 3 | October 6 | St. Louis | 2–4 | Chicago | | Hofer | United Center | 20,270 | 1–2–0 | 2 |
| 4 | October 8 | San Jose | 3–2 | St. Louis | OT | Hofer | Enterprise Center | 18,096 | 1–2–1 | 3 |
| 5 | October 10 | Columbus | 3–5 | St. Louis | | Binnington | Enterprise Center | 18,096 | 2–2–1 | 5 |
| 6 | October 13 | St. Louis | 7–2 | Ottawa | | Hofer | Canadian Tire Centre | 14,085 | 3–2–1 | 7 |
| 7 | October 15 | St. Louis | 4–5 | Minnesota | | Hofer | Grand Casino Arena | 18,623 | 3–3–1 | 7 |
| 8 | October 17 | St. Louis | 2–5 | Nashville | | Binnington | Bridgestone Arena | 17,159 | 3–4–1 | 7 |
| 9 | October 20 | Winnipeg | 1–2 | St. Louis | | Hofer | Enterprise Center | 18,096 | 4–4–1 | 9 |
| 10 | October 22 | Vegas | 2–6 | St. Louis | | Hofer | Enterprise Center | 18,096 | 5–4–1 | 11 |
| 11 | October 24 | Carolina | 4–0 | St. Louis | | Hofer | Enterprise Center | 18,096 | 5–5–1 | 11 |
| 12 | October 27 | Montreal | 2–0 | St. Louis | | Binnington | Enterprise Center | 16,234 | 5–6–1 | 11 |
| 13 | October 29 | Boston | 1–4 | St. Louis | | Hofer | Enterprise Center | 18,096 | 6–6–1 | 13 |
| 14 | October 31 | St. Louis | 5–4 | Detroit | | Hofer | Little Caesars Arena | 17,565 | 7–6–1 | 15 |

November: 3–3–1 (home: 2–1–0; road: 1–2–1)
| # | Date | Visitor | Score | Home | OT | Decision | Location | Attendance | Record | Pts | Recap |
|---|---|---|---|---|---|---|---|---|---|---|---|
| 15 | November 3 | St. Louis | 1–3 | NY Rangers | | Hofer | Madison Square Garden | 16,950 | 7–7–1 | 15 |
| 16 | November 5 | St. Louis | 4–5 | New Jersey | OT | Binnington | Prudential Center | 16,514 | 7–7–2 | 16 |
| 17 | November 7 | St. Louis | 1–3 | Nashville | | Hofer | Bridgestone Arena | 17,159 | 7–8–2 | 16 |
| 18 | November 10 | Detroit | 2–3 | St. Louis | | Hofer | Enterprise Center | 18,096 | 8–8–2 | 18 |
| 19 | November 12 | St. Louis | 1–0 | Utah | SO | Hofer | Delta Center | 14,111 | 9–8–2 | 20 |
| 20 | November 14 | Florida | 4–1 | St. Louis | | Hofer | Enterprise Center | 18,096 | 9–9–2 | 20 |
| 21 | November 17 | Anaheim | 6–8 | St. Louis | | Binnington | Enterprise Center | 17,007 | 10–9–2 | 22 |
| 22 | November 19 | St. Louis | 5–2 | Pittsburgh | | Hofer | PPG Paints Arena | 15,396 | 11–9–2 | 24 |
| 23 | November 21 | New Jersey | – | St. Louis | | | Enterprise Center |
| 24 | November 22 | Edmonton | – | St. Louis | | | Enterprise Center |
| 25 | November 25 | St. Louis | – | NY Islanders | | | UBS Arena |
| 26 | November 27 | Dallas | – | St. Louis | | | Enterprise Center |
| 27 | November 28 | Washington | – | St. Louis | | | Enterprise Center |

December: 0–0–0 (home: 0–0–0; road: 0–0–0)
| # | Date | Visitor | Score | Home | OT | Decision | Location | Attendance | Record | Pts | Recap |
|---|---|---|---|---|---|---|---|---|---|---|---|
| 28 | December 2 | Pittsburgh | – | St. Louis | | | Enterprise Center |
| 29 | December 4 | Chicago | – | St. Louis | | | Enterprise Center |
| 30 | December 6 | Nashville | – | St. Louis | | | Enterprise Center |
| 31 | December 8 | Colorado | – | St. Louis | | | Enterprise Center |
| 32 | December 10 | St. Louis | – | Utah | | | Delta Center |
| 33 | December 12 | St. Louis | – | Dallas | | | American Airlines Center |
| 34 | December 13 | Tampa Bay | – | St. Louis | | | Enterprise Center |
| 35 | December 15 | Winnipeg | – | St. Louis | | | Enterprise Center |
| 36 | December 17 | St. Louis | – | Boston | | | TD Garden |
| 37 | December 19 | St. Louis | – | Washington | | | Capital One Arena |
| 38 | December 21 | St. Louis | – | Florida | | | Amerant Bank Arena |
| 39 | December 22 | St. Louis | – | Tampa Bay | | | Benchmark International Arena |
| 40 | December 27 | NY Rangers | – | St. Louis | | | Enterprise Center |
| 41 | December 29 | St. Louis | – | Colorado | | | Ball Arena |
| 42 | December 31 | St. Louis | – | Vegas | | | T-Mobile Arena |

January: 0–0–0 (home: 0–0–0; road: 0–0–0)
| # | Date | Visitor | Score | Home | OT | Decision | Location | Attendance | Record | Pts | Recap |
|---|---|---|---|---|---|---|---|---|---|---|---|
| 43 | January 2 | St. Louis | – | Minnesota | | | Grand Casino Arena |
| 44 | January 3 | Calgary | – | St. Louis | | | Enterprise Center |
| 45 | January 5 | St. Louis | – | Carolina | | | Lenovo Center |
| 46 | January 8 | Ottawa | – | St. Louis | | | Enterprise Center |
| 47 | January 13 | St. Louis | – | Los Angeles | | | Crypto.com Arena |
| 48 | January 14 | St. Louis | – | Anaheim | | | Honda Center |
| 49 | January 16 | Minnesota | – | St. Louis | | | Enterprise Center |
| 50 | January 18 | St. Louis | – | Toronto | | | Scotiabank Arena |
| 51 | January 21 | St. Louis | – | Montreal | | | Bell Centre |
| 52 | January 23 | Toronto | – | St. Louis | | | Enterprise Center |
| 53 | January 26 | Chicago | – | St. Louis | | | Enterprise Center |
| 54 | January 28 | Colorado | – | St. Louis | | | Enterprise Center |
| 55 | January 30 | Vancouver | – | St. Louis | | | Enterprise Center |

February: 0–0–0 (home: 0–0–0; road: 0–0–0)
| # | Date | Visitor | Score | Home | OT | Decision | Location | Attendance | Record | Pts | Recap |
|---|---|---|---|---|---|---|---|---|---|---|---|
| 56 | February 9 | Los Angeles | – | St. Louis | | | Enterprise Center |
| 57 | February 12 | St. Louis | – | Edmonton | | | Rogers Place |
| 58 | February 13 | St. Louis | – | Seattle | | | Climate Pledge Arena |
| 59 | February 15 | Philadelphia | – | St. Louis | | | Enterprise Center |
| 60 | February 17 | St. Louis | – | Chicago | | | United Center |
| 61 | February 19 | St. Louis | – | Winnipeg | | | Canada Life Centre |
| 62 | February 21 | Utah | – | St. Louis | | | Enterprise Center |
| 63 | February 25 | Vancouver | – | St. Louis | | | Enterprise Center |
| 64 | February 27 | Minnesota | – | St. Louis | | | Enterprise Center |
| 65 | February 28 | Dallas | – | St. Louis | | | Enterprise Center |

March: 0–0–0 (home: 0–0–0; road: 0–0–0)
| # | Date | Visitor | Score | Home | OT | Decision | Location | Attendance | Record | Pts | Recap |
|---|---|---|---|---|---|---|---|---|---|---|---|
| 66 | March 4 | St. Louis | – | Buffalo | | | KeyBank Center |
| 67 | March 7 | St. Louis | – | Philadelphia | | | Xfinity Mobile Arena |
| 68 | March 9 | Nashville | – | St. Louis | | | Enterprise Center |
| 69 | March 11 | San Jose | – | St. Louis | | | Enterprise Center |
| 70 | March 13 | Anaheim | – | St. Louis | | | Enterprise Center |
| 71 | March 15 | St. Louis | – | Seattle | | | Climate Pledge Arena |
| 72 | March 18 | St. Louis | – | Edmonton | | | Rogers Place |
| 73 | March 20 | St. Louis | – | Vancouver | | | Rogers Arena |
| 74 | March 21 | St. Louis | – | Calgary | | | Scotiabank Saddledome |
| 75 | March 23 | St. Louis | – | Winnipeg | | | Canada Life Centre |
| 76 | March 25 | NY Islanders | – | St. Louis | | | Enterprise Center |
| 77 | March 27 | St. Louis | – | Columbus | | | Nationwide Arena |
| 78 | March 28 | Buffalo | – | St. Louis | | | Enterprise Center |

April: 0–0–0 (home: 0–0–0; road: 0–0–0)
| # | Date | Visitor | Score | Home | OT | Decision | Location | Attendance | Record | Pts | Recap |
|---|---|---|---|---|---|---|---|---|---|---|---|
| 79 | April 1 | Calgary | – | St. Louis | | | Enterprise Center |
| 80 | April 3 | St. Louis | – | Los Angeles | | | Crypto.com Arena |
| 81 | April 4 | St. Louis | – | San Jose | | | SAP Center |
| 82 | April 6 | St. Louis | – | Vegas | | | T-Mobile Arena |
| 83 | April 8 | Seattle | – | St. Louis | | | Enterprise Center |
| 84 | April 10 | Utah | – | St. Louis | | | Enterprise Center |

Legend: Win (2 points) Loss (0 points) Overtime/shootout loss (1 point)

== Roster ==
Updated November 16, 2026

| No. | Nat | Player | Pos | S/G | Age | Acquired | Birthplace |
|---|---|---|---|---|---|---|---|
| 72 | (Canada) | Justin Barron | D | R | 25 | 2026 | Halifax, Nova Scotia |
| 29 | (Sweden) | Jonatan Berggren | RW | L | 26 | 2025 | Uppsala, Sweden |
| 50 | (Canada) | Jordan Binnington | G | L | 33 | 2011 | Richmond Hill, Ontario |
| 6 | (Sweden) | Philip Broberg (A) | D | L | 25 | 2024 | Örebro, Sweden |
| 89 | (Russia) | Pavel Buchnevich | LW | L | 31 | 2021 | Cherepovets, Russia |
| 25 | (United States) | Brandon Carlo | D | R | 29 | 2026 | Colorado Springs, Colorado |
| 65 | (Canada) | Dillon Dubé | C | L | 28 | 2026 | Golden, British Columbia |
| 15 | (Slovakia) | Dalibor Dvorský | RW | L | 21 | 2023 | Zvolen, Slovakia |
| 17 | (United States) | Cam Fowler | D | L | 34 | 2024 | Windsor, Ontario |
| 30 | (Canada) | Joel Hofer | G | L | 26 | 2018 | Winnipeg, Manitoba |
| 81 | (Canada) | Dylan Holloway (A) | LW | L | 25 | 2024 | Calgary, Alberta |
| 49 | (Canada) | Ross Johnston | LW | L | 32 | 2026 | Charlottetown, Prince Edward Island |
| 65 | (Finland) | Aleksanteri Kaskimaki | C | L | 22 | 2022 | Espoo, Finland |
| 23 | (Canada) | Logan Mailloux | D | R | 23 | 2025 | Belle River, Ontario |
| 77 | (Canada) | Connor McMichael | LW | L | 25 | 2026 | Ajax, Ontario |
| 83 | (Canada) | Mason McTavish | C | L | 23 | 2026 | Zurich, Switzerland |
| 63 | (Canada) | Jake Neighbours (A) | LW | L | 24 | 2020 | Calgary, Alberta |
| 55 | (Canada) | Colton Parayko (A) | D | R | 33 | 2012 | St. Albert, Alberta |
| 43 | (Sweden) | Calle Rosén | D | L | 32 | 2021 | Växjö, Sweden |
| 21 | (United States) | Jimmy Snuggerud | RW | R | 22 | 2022 | Minneapolis, Minnesota |
| 22 | (Switzerland) | Pius Suter | C | L | 30 | 2025 | Zurich, Switzerland |
| 18 | (Canada) | Robert Thomas (C) | C | R | 27 | 2017 | Aurora, Ontario |
| 13 | (Russia) | Alexey Toropchenko | RW | L | 27 | 2017 | Moscow, Russia |
| 75 | (Canada) | Tyler Tucker | D | L | 26 | 2018 | Thunder Bay, Ontario |
| 26 | (Australia) | Nathan Walker | LW | L | 32 | 2019 | Cardiff, United Kingdom |

== Transactions ==
=== Trades ===
| Date | Details | | Ref |
|---|---|---|---|
| June 26, 2026 | To Anaheim Ducks DET 1st-round pick in 2026; COL 1st-round pick in 2026 | To St. Louis Blues Mason McTavish | |
| June 27, 2026 | To Toronto Maple Leafs NJD 3rd-round pick in 2026; SJS 3rd-round pick in 2026 | To St. Louis Blues Brandon Carlo | |

=== Players acquired ===
| Date | Player | Former team | Term | Via | Ref |
|---|---|---|---|---|---|
| July 1, 2026 | Ross Johnston | Anaheim Ducks | 3-year | Free agency | |
| July 1, 2026 | Dillon Dubé | Springfield Thunderbirds (PTO) | 1-year | Free agency | |

=== Signings ===
| Date | Player | Term | Ref |
|---|---|---|---|
| July 1, 2026 | Jonatan Berggren | 1-year | |
| July 10, 2026 | Oskar Sundqvist | 1-year | |
| July 16, 2026 | Connor McMichael | 6-year | |

== Draft picks ==
Below are the St. Louis Blues ' selections at the 2026 NHL entry draft, which was held on June 26 to 27, 2026, at KeyBank Center in Buffalo, New York.

| Round | # | Player | Pos. | Nationality | Team (League) |
|---|---|---|---|---|---|
| 1 | 11 | Tynan Lawrence | C | Canada | Boston University Terriers (Hockey East) |
| 1 | 16 (Note: The Washington Capitals' first-round pick will go to the St. Louis Blues as the result of a trade on June 23, 2026, that sent Jordan Kyrou to Washington in exchange for Connor McMichael, Milton Gastrin and this pick.) | Maddox Dagenais | C | Canada | Quebec Remparts (QMJHL) |
| 3 | 75 | Luke Schairer | D | United States | US-NTDP (USHL) |
| 4 | 107 | Landon Nycz | D | United States | University of Massachusetts Minutemen (Hockey East) |
| 4 | 123 (Note: The Dallas Stars' fourth round pick went to the St. Louis Blues as the result of a trade on February 4, 2026 that sent Nick Bjugstad to the New Jersey Devils in exchange for Thomas Bordeleau and this pick. New Jersey previously acquired this pick as the result of a trade on February 28, 2024 that sent Christopher Tanev to Dallas in exchange for this pick.) | Vladimir Proskurin | G | Russia | MHK Atlant Mytishchi (MHL) |
| 5 | 139 | Nick Bogas | D | United States | US-NTDP (USHL) |
| 5 | 150 (Note: The Pittsburgh Penguins' fifth-round pick will go to the St. Louis Blues as the result of a trade on August 13, 2024, that sent a 2025 third-round pick and a 2026 second-round pick to Pittsburgh in exchange for a 2025 second-round pick and this pick.) | Carter Stevens | C | Canada | Guelph Storm (OHL) |
| 6 | 171 | Lars Steiner | RW | Switzerland | Rouyn-Noranda Huskies (QMJHL) |
| 7 | 203 | Colin Fitzgerald | C | United States | Soo Greyhounds (OHL) |
