= 2026–27 Minnesota Wild season =

National Hockey League season

2026–27 Minnesota Wild
- Division: Central
- Conference: Western
- 2026–27 record: 16–3–4
- Home record: 6–0–2
- Road record: 10–3–2
- Goals for: 83
- Goals against: 51

Team information
- General manager: Bill Guerin
- Coach: John Hynes
- Captain: Jared Spurgeon
- Alternate captains: Marcus Foligno; Kirill Kaprizov
- Arena: Grand Casino Arena
- Minor league affiliates: Iowa Wild (AHL); Jacksonville Icemen (ECHL)

Team leaders
- Goals: Kirill Kaprizov (17)
- Assists: Quinn Hughes (25)
- Points: Kirill Kaprizov (40)
- Penalty minutes: Blake Coleman (22)
- Plus/minus: Kirill Kaprizov (+21)
- Wins: Jesper Wallstedt (15)
- Goals against average: Jesper Wallstedt (1.99)

The 2026–27 Minnesota Wild season is the 27th season of operation (26th season of play) of the National Hockey League (NHL) franchise that was established on June 25, 1997.

== Standings ==
=== Divisional standings ===
Central Division
| Pos | Team | GP | W | L | OTL | RW | GF | GA | GD | Pts |
|---|---|---|---|---|---|---|---|---|---|---|
| 1 | Minnesota Wild | 23 | 16 | 3 | 4 | 15 | 83 | 51 | +32 | 36 |
| 2 | Dallas Stars | 21 | 13 | 6 | 2 | 8 | 60 | 53 | +7 | 28 |
| 3 | Colorado Avalanche | 22 | 12 | 7 | 3 | 12 | 86 | 68 | +18 | 27 |
| 4 | Nashville Predators | 22 | 11 | 6 | 5 | 8 | 67 | 66 | +1 | 27 |
| 5 | Utah Mammoth | 23 | 11 | 9 | 3 | 9 | 77 | 79 | −2 | 25 |
| 6 | Winnipeg Jets | 22 | 10 | 9 | 3 | 8 | 67 | 74 | −7 | 23 |
| 7 | St. Louis Blues | 21 | 10 | 9 | 2 | 8 | 63 | 65 | −2 | 22 |
| 8 | Chicago Blackhawks | 21 | 6 | 13 | 2 | 4 | 52 | 86 | −34 | 14 |

Updated to game(s) played on November 18, 2026. Source: National Hockey League
Rules for classification: 1) Fewer number of games played (GP, only during regular season); 2) Greater number of regulation wins (RW); 3) Greater number of wins in regulation and overtime, excluding shootout wins (ROW); 4) Greater number of total wins, including shootouts (W); 5) Greater number of points earned in head-to-head play; if teams played an uneven number of head-to-head games, the result of the first game on the home ice of the team with the extra home game is discarded; 6) Greater goal differential (GD); 7) Greater number of goals scored (GF)

=== Conference standings ===
Western Conference Wild Card
| Pos | Div | Team | GP | W | L | OTL | RW | GF | GA | GD | Pts |
|---|---|---|---|---|---|---|---|---|---|---|---|
| 1 | CE | Nashville Predators | 22 | 11 | 6 | 5 | 8 | 67 | 66 | +1 | 27 |
| 2 | CE | Utah Mammoth | 23 | 11 | 9 | 3 | 9 | 77 | 79 | −2 | 25 |
| 3 | CE | Winnipeg Jets | 22 | 10 | 9 | 3 | 8 | 67 | 74 | −7 | 23 |
| 4 | CE | St. Louis Blues | 21 | 10 | 9 | 2 | 9 | 63 | 65 | −2 | 22 |
| 5 | PA | San Jose Sharks | 24 | 10 | 12 | 2 | 3 | 65 | 86 | −21 | 22 |
| 6 | PA | Calgary Flames | 22 | 10 | 11 | 1 | 9 | 56 | 76 | −20 | 21 |
| 7 | PA | Seattle Kraken | 18 | 9 | 8 | 1 | 6 | 59 | 66 | −7 | 19 |
| 8 | PA | Los Angeles Kings | 19 | 6 | 11 | 2 | 4 | 52 | 63 | −11 | 14 |
| 9 | CE | Chicago Blackhawks | 21 | 6 | 13 | 2 | 4 | 52 | 86 | −34 | 14 |
| 10 | PA | Vancouver Canucks | 23 | 5 | 17 | 1 | 3 | 66 | 100 | −34 | 11 |

Updated to game(s) played on November 18, 2026. Source: National Hockey League
Rules for classification: 1) Fewer number of games played (GP, only during regular season); 2) Greater number of regulation wins (RW); 3) Greater number of wins in regulation and overtime, excluding shootout wins (ROW); 4) Greater number of total wins, including shootouts (W); 5) Greater number of points earned in head-to-head play; if teams played an uneven number of head-to-head games, the result of the first game on the home ice of the team with the extra home game is discarded; 6) Greater goal differential (GD); 7) Greater number of goals scored (GF)

== Schedule and results ==
=== Preseason ===
The preseason schedule was released on July 6, 2026.

2026–27 Minnesota Wild preseason
2026 preseason game log: 1–2–1 (Home: 1–1–0; Road: 0–1–1)

| # | Date | Visitor | Score | Home | OT | Location | Attendance | Record | Recap |
|---|---|---|---|---|---|---|---|---|---|
| 1 | September 19 | Chicago | 2–3 | Minnesota | OT | Grand Casino Arena | 15,738 | 1–0–0 | |
| 2 | September 21 | Minnesota | 3–4 | Chicago | OT | United Center | 10,605 | 1–0–1 | |
| 3 | Septembter 23 | Minnesota | 0–2 | Dallas | | American Airlines Center | 14,991 | 1–1–1 | |
| 4 | September 25 | Dallas | 2–1 | Minnesota | | Grand Casino Arena | 15,645 | 1–2–1 | |

Legend

Win Loss OT/SO Loss

=== Regular season ===
The regular season schedule was released on July 16, 2026.

2026–27 game log

October: 9–3–3 (Home: 4–0–1; Road: 5–3–2)
| # | Date | Visitor | Score | Home | OT | Decision | Attendance | Record | Pts | Recap |
|---|---|---|---|---|---|---|---|---|---|---|
| 1 | October 1 | Minnesota | 3–1 | Nashville | | Wallstedt | 17,284 | 1–0–0 | 2 |
| 2 | October 3 | Boston | 1–4 | Minnesota | | Wallstedt | 19,185 | 2–0–0 | 4 |
| 3 | October 6 | Minnesota | 2–3 | Buffalo | OT | Wallstedt | 19,070 | 2–0–1 | 5 |
| 4 | October 8 | Minnesota | 2–3 | Tampa Bay | | Wallstedt | 19,092 | 2–1–1 | 5 |
| 5 | October 10 | Minnesota | 4–1 | Florida | | Wallstedt | 19,856 | 3–1–1 | 7 |
| 6 | October 12 | Vegas | 2–4 | Minnesota | | Wallstedt | 17,566 | 4–1–1 | 9 |
| 7 | October 13 | Minnesota | 2–5 | Winnipeg | | Pickard | 14,108 | 4–2–1 | 9 |
| 8 | October 15 | St. Louis | 4–5 | Minnesota | | Wallstedt | 18,623 | 5–2–1 | 11 |
| 9 | October 18 | Columbus | 1–2 | Minnesota | | Wallstedt | 18,012 | 6–2–1 | 13 |
| 10 | October 20 | Minnesota | 3–4 | Edmonton | OT | Wallstedt | 17,032 | 6–2–2 | 14 |
| 11 | October 22 | Minnesota | 1–2 | Calgary | | Wallstedt | 16,834 | 6–3–2 | 14 |
| 12 | October 24 | Minnesota | 5–1 | Seattle | | Wallstedt | 17,151 | 7–3–2 | 16 |
| 13 | October 25 | Minnesota | 4–2 | Vancouver | | Pickard | 17,560 | 8–3–2 | 18 |
| 14 | October 27 | Minnesota | 3–1 | Utah | | Wallstedt | 14,111 | 9–3–2 | 20 |
| 15 | October 29 | NY Islanders | 4–3 | Minnesota | OT | Wallstedt | 18,155 | 9–3–3 | 21 |

November: 8–0–1 (Home: 2–0–1; Road: 6–0–0)
| # | Date | Visitor | Score | Home | OT | Decision | Attendance | Record | Pts | Recap |
|---|---|---|---|---|---|---|---|---|---|---|
| 16 | November 1 | Minnesota | 5–1 | Washington | | Wallstedt | 17,393 | 10–3–3 | 23 |
| 17 | November 3 | Minnesota | 4–2 | Philadelphia | | Wallstedt | 17,889 | 11–3–3 | 25 |
| 18 | November 6 | San Jose | 1–4 | Minnesota | | Wallstedt | 19,009 | 12–3–3 | 27 |
| 19 | November 7 | Tampa Bay | 4–3 | Minnesota | OT | Pickard | 19,155 | 12–3–4 | 28 |
| 20 | November 10 | Minnesota | 2–1 | Montreal | OT | Wallstedt | 20,962 | 13–3–4 | 30 |
| 21 | November 12 | Minnesota | 5–2 | Toronto | | Wallstedt | 18,397 | 14–3–4 | 32 |
| 22 | November 14 | Minnesota | 6–2 | Boston | | Wallstedt | 17,850 | 15–3–4 | 34 |
| 23 | November 17 | Nashville | 3–7 | Minnesota | | Wallstedt | 18,807 | 16–3–4 | 36 |
| 24 | November 19 | Minnesota | 4–1 | Calgary | | Wallstedt | 18,300 | 17–3–4 | 38 |
| 25 | November 21 | Minnesota | | Vancouver |
| 26 | November 23 | Minnesota | | San Jose |
| 27 | November 25 | Utah | | Minnesota |
| 28 | November 27 | Colorado | | Minnesota |
| 29 | November 29 | Minnesota | | Chicago |

December: 0–0–0 (Home: 0–0–0; Road: 0–0–0)
| # | Date | Visitor | Score | Home | OT | Decision | Attendance | Record | Pts | Recap |
|---|---|---|---|---|---|---|---|---|---|---|
| 30 | December 1 | Minnesota | | Anaheim |
| 31 | December 3 | Minnesota | | Los Angeles |
| 32 | December 5 | Philadelphia | | Minnesota |
| 33 | December 8 | Edmonton | | Minnesota |
| 34 | December 10 | Minnesota | | Columbus |
| 35 | December 12 | Winnipeg | | Minnesota |
| 36 | December 15 | Toronto | | Minnesota |
| 37 | December 18 | Anaheim | | Minnesota |
| 38 | December 19 | Montreal | | Minnesota |
| 39 | December 22 | Los Angeles | | Minnesota |
| 40 | December 26 | Winnipeg | | Minnesota |
| 41 | December 28 | Vegas | | Minnesota |

January: 0–0–0 (Home: 0–0–0; Road: 0–0–0)
| # | Date | Visitor | Score | Home | OT | Decision | Attendance | Record | Pts | Recap |
|---|---|---|---|---|---|---|---|---|---|---|
| 42 | January 1 | Minnesota | | Pittsburgh |
| 43 | January 2 | St. Louis | | Minnesota |
| 44 | January 5 | Minnesota | | Anaheim |
| 45 | January 7 | Minnesota | | Vegas |
| 46 | January 9 | Nashville | | Minnesota |
| 47 | January 14 | Florida | | Minnesota |
| 48 | January 16 | Minnesota | | St. Louis |
| 49 | January 17 | Minnesota | | Detroit |
| 50 | January 19 | Minnesota | | Winnipeg |
| 51 | January 21 | Detroit | | Minnesota |
| 52 | January 23 | NY Rangers | | Minnesota |
| 53 | January 25 | Minnesota | | Utah |
| 54 | January 26 | Vancouver | | Minnesota |
| 55 | January 28 | Seattle | | Minnesota |
| 56 | January 30 | Dallas | | Minnesota |

February: 0–0–0 (Home: 0–0–0; Road: 0–0–0)
| # | Date | Visitor | Score | Home | OT | Decision | Attendance | Record | Pts | Recap |
|---|---|---|---|---|---|---|---|---|---|---|
| 57 | February 11 | Minnesota | | Carolina |
| 58 | February 13 | Minnesota | | NY Islanders |
| 59 | February 15 | Ottawa | | Minnesota |
| 60 | February 16 | Minnesota | | Dallas |
| 61 | February 18 | Los Angeles | | Minnesota |
| 62 | February 20 | Minnesota | | Chicago |
| 63 | February 23 | Pittsburgh | | Minnesota |
| 64 | February 27 | Minnesota | | St. Louis |
| 65 | February 28 | New Jersey | | Minnesota |

March: 0–0–0 (Home: 0–0–0; Road: 0–0–0)
| # | Date | Visitor | Score | Home | OT | Decision | Attendance | Record | Pts | Recap |
|---|---|---|---|---|---|---|---|---|---|---|
| 66 | March 3 | Minnesota | | Dallas |
| 67 | March 6 | Minnesota | | Nashville |
| 68 | March 7 | Washington | | Minnesota |
| 69 | March 9 | Carolina | | Minnesota |
| 70 | March 11 | Minnesota | | Ottawa |
| 71 | March 14 | Buffalo | | Minnesota |
| 72 | March 17 | Minnesota | | Colorado |
| 73 | March 19 | Calgary | | Minnesota |
| 74 | March 21 | Utah | | Minnesota |
| 75 | March 23 | Chicago | | Minnesota |
| 76 | March 25 | Edmonton | | Minnesota |
| 77 | March 27 | Seattle | | Minnesota |
| 78 | March 29 | Minnesota | | NY Rangers |
| 79 | March 31 | Minnesota | | New Jersey |

April: 0–0–0 (Home: 0–0–0; Road: 0–0–0)
| # | Date | Visitor | Score | Home | OT | Decision | Attendance | Record | Pts | Recap |
|---|---|---|---|---|---|---|---|---|---|---|
| 80 | April 2 | Dallas | | Minnesota |
| 81 | April 4 | Colorado | | Minnesota |
| 82 | April 6 | Chicago | | Minnesota |
| 83 | April 8 | Minnesota | | San Jose |
| 84 | April 10 | Minnesota | | Colorado |

Legend: Win (2 points) Loss (0 points) Overtime/shootout loss (1 point)

== Roster ==
Updated November 10, 2026

| No. | Nat | Player | Pos | S/G | Age | Acquired | Birthplace |
|---|---|---|---|---|---|---|---|
| 24 | (United States) | Zach Bogosian | D | R | 36 | 2023 | Massena, New York |
| 12 | (United States) | Matt Boldy | RW | L | 25 | 2019 | Millis, Massachusetts |
| 10 | (United States) | Bobby Brink | RW | R | 25 | 2026 | Minnetonka, Minnesota |
| 25 | (Sweden) | Jonas Brodin | D | L | 33 | 2011 | Karlstad, Sweden |
| 20 | (United States) | Blake Coleman | LW | L | 34 | 2026 | Plano, Texas |
| 14 | (Sweden) | Joel Eriksson Ek | C | L | 29 | 2015 | Karlstad, Sweden |
| 7 | (United States) | Brock Faber | D | R | 24 | 2022 | Maple Grove, Minnesota |
| 17 | (United States) | Marcus Foligno (A) | RW | L | 35 | 2017 | Buffalo, New York |
| 71 | (United States) | Nick Foligno | LW | L | 39 | 2026 | Buffalo, New York |
| 32 | (Sweden) | Filip Gustavsson | G | L | 28 | 2022 | Skellefteå, Sweden |
| 38 | (United States) | Ryan Hartman | C | R | 32 | 2019 | Hilton Head Island, South Carolina |
| 43 | (United States) | Quinn Hughes | D | L | 27 | 2025 | Orlando, Florida |
| 97 | (Russia) | Kirill Kaprizov (A) | LW | L | 29 | 2015 | Novokuznetsk, Russia |
| 26 | (United States) | Matt Kiersted | D | L | 28 | 2025 | Elk River, Minnesota |
| 3 | (Finland) | Olli Määttä | D | L | 32 | 2026 | Jyväskylä, Finland |
| 47 | (United States) | Michael McCarron | C | R | 31 | 2026 | Grosse Pointe, Michigan |
| 31 | (Canada) | Calvin Pickard | G | L | 34 | 2026 | Moncton, New Brunswick |
| 49 | (Russia) | Maxim Shabanov | RW | L | 26 | 2026 | Chelyabinsk, Russia |
| 82 | (Czech Republic) | David Spacek | D | R | 23 | 2022 | Columbus, Ohio |
| 46 | (Canada) | Jared Spurgeon (C) | D | R | 36 | 2010 | Edmonton, Alberta |
| 78 | (Germany) | Nico Sturm | C | L | 31 | 2025 | Augsburg, Germany |
| 13 | (Russia) | Yakov Trenin | C | R | 29 | 2024 | Chelyabinsk, Russia |
| 30 | (Sweden) | Jesper Wallstedt | G | L | 24 | 2021 | Västerås, Sweden |
| 22 | (Russia) | Danila Yurov | RW | L | 22 | 2022 | Chelyabinsk, Russia |

== Player statistics ==
Final statistics will be entered after the completion of the regular season.

== Transactions ==
The Wild have been involved in the following transactions during the 2026–27 season.

Key:

† Contract is entry-level.

=== Trades ===
| Date | Details | | Ref |
|---|---|---|---|
| July 2, 2026 | To Calgary Flames Jake Middleton; 3rd-round pick in 2027; 4th-round pick in 2028; 2nd-round pick in 2029 | To Minnesota Wild Blake Coleman* (Note: Calgary retained 50% of Coleman's contract.); Olli Maatta | |

=== Players acquired ===
| Date | Player | Former team | Term | Via | Ref |
|---|---|---|---|---|---|
| July 1, 2026 | Justin Kirkland | Calgary Flames | 1-year | Free agency | |
| July 1, 2026 | Calvin Pickard | Edmonton Oilers | 1-year | Free agency | |
| July 1, 2026 | Mason Shaw | Winnipeg Jets | 1-year | Free agency | |
| July 1, 2026 | Dylan Gambrell | Iowa Wild | 1-year | Free agency | |
| July 1, 2026 | Jagger Joshua | Rochester Americans | 2-year | Free agency | |
| July 2, 2026 | Max Shabanov | New York Islanders | 1-year | Free agency | |

=== Players lost ===
| Date | Player | New team | Term | Via | Ref |
|---|---|---|---|---|---|
| July 1, 2026 | Mats Zuccarello | Los Angeles Kings | 1-year | Free agency | |
| July 1, 2026 | Cameron Butler | Detroit Red Wings | 1-year | Free agency | |
| July 1, 2026 | Ben Jones | Calgary Flames | 1-year | Free agency | |
| July 3, 2026 | Samuel Hlavaj | Toronto Maple Leafs | 1-year | Free agency | |

=== Signings ===
| Date | Player | Term | Ref |
|---|---|---|---|
| July 1, 2026 | Calvin Pickard | 1-year | |
| July 1, 2026 | Dylan Gambrell | 1-year | |
| July 1, 2026 | Jagger Joshua | 2-year | |
| July 1, 2026 | Justin Kirkland | 1-year | |
| July 1, 2026 | Mason Shaw | 1-year | |
| July 2, 2026 | Max Shabanov | 1-year | |

=== Waivers ===
| Date | Player | Team | Ref |
|---|---|---|---|
| October 28, 2026 | Cameron Crotty | Ottawa Senators | |

== Draft picks ==
Below are the Minnesota Wild's selections at the 2026 NHL entry draft, which was held on June 26–27, 2026, at KeyBank Center in Buffalo, New York.

| Round | # | Player | Pos | Nationality | College/Junior/Club team (League) |
|---|---|---|---|---|---|
| 3 | 83 | Adam Andersson | C | Sweden | Leksands IF J20 (J20 Nationell) |
| 4 | 112 | Kayden Lemire | RW | Canada | Prince George Cougars (WHL) |
| 5 | 137 | Filip Ruzicka | G | Czech Republic | Brandon Wheat Kings (WHL) |
