= 2026–27 Detroit Red Wings season =

Ice hockey franchise season

2026–27 Detroit Red Wings
- Division: Atlantic
- Conference: Eastern
- 2026–27 record: 8–11–3
- Home record: 4–6–1
- Road record: 4–5–2
- Goals for: 58
- Goals against: 68

Team information
- General manager: Shawn Horcoff (interim)
- Coach: Todd McLellan
- Captain: Vacant
- Alternate captains: Alex DeBrincat; Lucas Raymond; Moritz Seider
- Arena: Little Caesars Arena
- Minor league affiliates: Grand Rapids Griffins (AHL); Toledo Walleye (ECHL)

Team leaders
- Goals: Lucas Raymond (9)
- Assists: Lucas Raymond (13)
- Points: Lucas Raymond (22)
- Penalty minutes: Ben Chiarot (25)
- Plus/minus: Michael Brandsegg-Nygård (+10)
- Wins: John Gibson (4)
- Goals against average: Daniil Tarasov (1.98)

The 2026–27 Detroit Red Wings season is the 101st season for the National Hockey League (NHL) franchise that was established on September 25, 1926. It is the Red Wings' tenth season at Little Caesars Arena. This is the Red Wings' second full season under head coach Todd McLellan.

== Off-season ==
On July 15, 2026, Steve Yzerman was moved from executive vice president and general manager to a senior advisor position. On September 15, 2026, Shawn Horcoff was named interim general manager.

== Standings ==
=== Divisional standings ===
Atlantic Division
Pos	Team	GP	W	L	OTL	RW	GF	GA	GD	Pts
1	Tampa Bay Lightning	21	14	5	2	12	79	61	+18	30
2	Ottawa Senators	22	14	6	2	11	70	62	+8	30
3	Montreal Canadiens	22	13	5	4	9	72	66	+6	30
4	Boston Bruins	22	14	7	1	11	76	56	+20	29
5	Florida Panthers	23	12	8	3	10	72	68	+4	27
6	Buffalo Sabres	21	8	9	4	6	58	74	−16	20
7	Detroit Red Wings	22	8	11	3	6	58	68	−10	19
8	Toronto Maple Leafs	23	8	13	2	7	72	82	−10	18

Updated to game(s) played on November 18, 2026. Source: National Hockey League
Rules for classification: 1) Fewer number of games played (GP, only during regular season); 2) Greater number of regulation wins (RW); 3) Greater number of wins in regulation and overtime, excluding shootout wins (ROW); 4) Greater number of total wins, including shootouts (W); 5) Greater number of points earned in head-to-head play; if teams played an uneven number of head-to-head games, the result of the first game on the home ice of the team with the extra home game is discarded; 6) Greater goal differential (GD); 7) Greater number of goals scored (GF)

=== Conference standings ===
Eastern Conference Wild Card
Pos	Div	Team	GP	W	L	OTL	RW	GF	GA	GD	Pts
1	AT	Boston Bruins	22	14	7	1	11	76	56	+20	29
2	AT	Florida Panthers	23	12	8	3	10	72	68	+4	27
3	ME	New York Islanders	20	10	6	4	8	65	57	+8	24
4	ME	Washington Capitals	19	10	9	0	8	64	70	−6	20
5	AT	Buffalo Sabres	21	8	9	4	6	58	74	−16	20
6	ME	Philadelphia Flyers	24	7	11	6	7	57	80	−23	20
7	AT	Detroit Red Wings	22	8	11	3	6	58	68	−10	19
8	AT	Toronto Maple Leafs	23	8	13	2	7	72	82	−10	18
9	ME	Pittsburgh Penguins	20	7	11	2	3	62	71	−9	16
10	ME	Columbus Blue Jackets	19	7	12	0	2	46	63	−17	14

Updated to game(s) played on November 18, 2026. Source: National Hockey League
Rules for classification: 1) Fewer number of games played (GP, only during regular season); 2) Greater number of regulation wins (RW); 3) Greater number of wins in regulation and overtime, excluding shootout wins (ROW); 4) Greater number of total wins, including shootouts (W); 5) Greater number of points earned in head-to-head play; if teams played an uneven number of head-to-head games, the result of the first game on the home ice of the team with the extra home game is discarded; 6) Greater goal differential (GD); 7) Greater number of goals scored (GF)

== Schedule and results ==
=== Preseason ===
2026 preseason game log: 2–1–1 (Home: 1–1–0; Road: 1–0–1)
#	Date	Visitor	Score	Home	OT	Decision	Attendance	Record	Recap
1	September 21	Detroit	0–1	Columbus	SO	Postava	12,300	0–0–1
2	September 22	Detroit	7–4	Pittsburgh		Augustine	11,768	1–0–1
3	September 24	Buffalo	2–3	Detroit	OT	Tarasov	15,887	2–0–1
4	September 26	Columbus	4–2	Detroit		Gibson	16,592	2–1–1

=== Regular season ===
2026–27 game log: 8–11–3 (Home: 4–6–1; Road: 4–5–2)

October: 6–5–3 (Home: 4–4–1; Road: 2–1–2)
#	Date	Visitor	Score	Home	OT	Decision	Attendance	Record	Pts	Recap
1	October 2	NY Rangers	2–0	Detroit		Gibson	19,515	0–1–0	0
2	October 4	Winnipeg	3–2	Detroit		Gibson	17,426	0–2–0	0
3	October 6	Ottawa	3–5	Detroit		Gibson	17,583	1–2–0	2
4	October 9	Seattle	6–3	Detroit		Gibson	17,603	1–3–0	2
5	October 10	Detroit	0–1	Montreal	SO	Tarasov	20,962	1–3–1	3
6	October 13	New Jersey	5–4	Detroit	OT	Gibson	18,306	1–3–2	4
7	October 15	Philadelphia	1–2	Detroit		Tarasov	17,551	2–3–2	6
8	October 17	San Jose	3–4	Detroit	SO	Gibson	17,979	3–3–2	8
9	October 20	Detroit	3–4	Seattle	SO	Tarasov	17,151	3–3–3	9
10	October 22	Detroit	5–2	Vancouver		Gibson	17,523	4–3–3	11
11	October 24	Detroit	1–4	Calgary		Gibson	17,779	4–4–3	11
12	October 26	Detroit	4–3	Edmonton	SO	Postava	17,043	5–4–3	13
13	October 29	Chicago	1–4	Detroit		Gibson	19,515	6–4–3	15
14	October 31	St. Louis	5–4	Detroit		Gibson	17,565	6–5–3	15

November: 2–6–0 (Home: 0–2–0; Road: 2–4–0)
#	Date	Visitor	Score	Home	OT	Decision	Attendance	Record	Pts	Recap
15	November 2	Detroit	5–3	Florida		Tarasov	18,862	7–5–3	17
16	November 3	Detroit	2–4	Tampa Bay		Tarasov	19,092	7–6–3	17
17	November 5	Vegas	2–1	Detroit		Tarasov	19,515	7–7–3	17
18	November 7	Detroit	0–4	Colorado		Tarasov	18,114	7–8–3	17
19	November 10	Detroit	2–3	St. Louis		Gibson	18,096	7–9–3	17
20	November 12	Detroit	4–5	Florida		Gibson	19,151	7–10–3	17
21	November 14	Detroit	2–0	Tampa Bay		Tarasov	19,092	8–10–3	19
22	November 18	Boston	4–1	Detroit		Tarasov	18,340	8–11–3	19
23	November 21	NY Islanders		Detroit
24	November 25	Vancouver		Detroit
25	November 27	Detroit		Columbus
26	November 28	Nashville		Detroit

December: 0–0–0 (Home: 0–0–0; Road: 0–0–0)
#	Date	Visitor	Score	Home	OT	Decision	Attendance	Record	Pts	Recap
27	December 1	Calgary		Detroit
28	December 3	Colorado		Detroit
29	December 5	Detroit		Boston
30	December 9	Detroit		New Jersey
31	December 11	NY Rangers		Detroit
32	December 12	Florida		Detroit
33	December 15	Los Angeles		Detroit
34	December 17	Detroit		Washington
35	December 18	Detroit		Philadelphia
36	December 20	Tampa Bay		Detroit
37	December 22	Toronto		Detroit
38	December 26	Detroit		Nashville
39	December 28	Detroit		Buffalo
40	December 29	Detroit		NY Rangers
41	December 31	Carolina		Detroit

January: 0–0–0 (Home: 0–0–0; Road: 0–0–0)
#	Date	Visitor	Score	Home	OT	Decision	Attendance	Record	Pts	Recap
42	January 2	Edmonton		Detroit
43	January 4	Detroit		Dallas
44	January 7	Utah		Detroit
45	January 9	Boston		Detroit
46	January 13	Detroit		Utah
47	January 16	Detroit		Chicago
48	January 17	Minnesota		Detroit
49	January 19	Anaheim		Detroit
50	January 21	Detroit		Minnesota
51	January 23	Tampa Bay		Detroit
52	January 25	Pittsburgh		Detroit
53	January 27	Toronto		Detroit
54	January 29	Florida		Detroit
55	January 30	Detroit		Columbus

February: 0–0–0 (Home: 0–0–0; Road: 0–0–0)
#	Date	Visitor	Score	Home	OT	Decision	Attendance	Record	Pts	Recap
All-Star Break in Elmont, New York
56	February 9	Detroit		Anaheim
57	February 11	Detroit		Los Angeles
58	February 13	Detroit		San Jose
59	February 15	Detroit		Vegas
60	February 18	Montreal		Detroit
61	February 19	Detroit		Carolina
62	February 21	Buffalo		Detroit
63	February 23	Detroit		Toronto
64	February 25	Detroit		Ottawa
65	February 27	Detroit		Boston

March: 0–0–0 (Home: 0–0–0; Road: 0–0–0)
#	Date	Visitor	Score	Home	OT	Decision	Attendance	Record	Pts	Recap
66	March 1	Detroit		Toronto
67	March 4	New Jersey		Detroit
68	March 6	Dallas		Detroit
69	March 9	Detroit		Winnipeg
70	March 12	Buffalo		Detroit
71	March 14	Detroit		Pittsburgh
72	March 16	Detroit		Philadelphia
73	March 18	Columbus		Detroit
74	March 20	Montreal		Detroit
75	March 23	Detroit		Washington
76	March 24	Washington		Detroit
77	March 27	Detroit		NY Islanders
78	March 28	Detroit		Montreal
79	March 30	Ottawa		Detroit

April: 0–0–0 (Home: 0–0–0; Road: 0–0–0)
#	Date	Visitor	Score	Home	OT	Decision	Attendance	Record	Pts	Recap
80	April 2	Carolina		Detroit
81	April 4	Detroit		Ottawa
82	April 6	Detroit		NY Islanders
83	April 9	Pittsburgh		Detroit
84	April 10	Detroit		Buffalo

Legend: Win (2 points) Loss (0 points) Overtime/shootout loss (1 point)

== Roster ==
Updated October 30, 2026

No.	Nat	Player	Pos	S/G	Age	Acquired	Birthplace
22	(United States)	Mason Appleton	C	R	30	2025	Green Bay, Wisconsin
33	(Sweden)	Viktor Arvidsson	RW	R	33	2026	Kusmark, Sweden
25	(Canada)	Jacob Bernard-Docker	D	R	26	2025	Canmore, Alberta
28	(Norway)	Michael Brandsegg-Nygård	RW	R	21	2024	Oslo, Norway
8	(Canada)	Ben Chiarot	D	L	35	2022	Hamilton, Ontario
37	(United States)	J. T. Compher	LW	R	31	2023	Northbrook, Illinois
18	(United States)	Andrew Copp	C	L	32	2022	Ann Arbor, Michigan
29	(Canada)	Nate Danielson	C	R	22	2023	Red Deer, Alberta
93	(United States)	Alex DeBrincat (A)	RW	R	28	2023	Farmington Hills, Michigan
15	(United States)	Sheldon Dries	C	L	32	2024	Macomb Township, Michigan
77	(Sweden)	Simon Edvinsson (RFA)	D	L	23	2021	Onsala, Sweden
24	(Sweden)	Andreas Englund	D	L	30	2026	Stockholm, Sweden
72	(United States)	Justin Faulk	D	R	34	2026	South St. Paul, Minnesota
58	(Canada)	Emmitt Finnie	LW	L	21	2023	Lethbridge, Alberta
36	(United States)	John Gibson	G	L	33	2025	Pittsburgh, Pennsylvania
20	(Sweden)	Albert Johansson	D	L	25	2019	Karlstad, Sweden
42	(Sweden)	Anton Johansson	D	R	22	2022	Stockholm, Sweden
92	(Austria)	Marco Kasper	C	L	22	2022	Innsbruck, Austria
55	(Canada)	Keegan Kolesar	RW	R	29	2026	Brandon, Manitoba
71	(United States)	Dylan Larkin	C	L	30	2014	Waterford, Michigan
34	(United States)	Carter Mazur	LW	R	24	2021	Jackson, Michigan
27	(Canada)	Michael Rasmussen	C	L	27	2017	Vancouver, British Columbia
23	(Sweden)	Lucas Raymond (A)	LW	R	24	2020	Gothenburg, Sweden
53	(Germany)	Moritz Seider (A)	D	R	25	2019	Zell, Germany
80	(Russia)	Daniil Tarasov	G	L	27	2026	Novokuznetsk, Russia
54	(Sweden)	William Wallinder	D	L	24	2020	Sollefteå, Sweden

== Draft picks ==
Below are the Detroit Red Wings' selections at the 2026 NHL entry draft, which will be held on June 26 and 27, 2026, at the KeyBank Center in Buffalo, New York.

Round	#	Player	Pos	Nationality	College/Junior/Club Team (League)
1	23^{1}	JP Hurlbert	LW	United States	Kamloops Blazers (WHL)
2	47	Victor Plante	LW	United States	U.S. NTDP (USHL)
3	79	Michal Oršulák	G	Czech Republic	Prince Albert Raiders (WHL)
4	108	Adam Levac	C	Canada	Peterborough Petes (OHL)
5	143	Beckham Edwards	C	Canada	Sarnia Sting (OHL)
6	175	Luka Arkko	LW	Finland	Lahti Pelicans (Liiga)
7	196^{2}	Myles Brosnan	D	United States	Sioux City Musketeers (USHL)

Notes:

1. The Utah Mammoth's first-round pick went to the Detroit Red Wings as the result of a trade on June 26, 2026, that sent Sebastian Cossa to Utah in exchange for this pick.
2. The Calgary Flames' seventh-round pick will go to the Detroit Red Wings as the result of a trade on June 28, 2025, that sent St. Louis's seventh-round pick in 2025 to Calgary in exchange for this pick.
