= 2026–27 Dallas Stars season =

National Hockey League season

2026–27 Dallas Stars
- Division: Central
- Conference: Western
- 2026–27 record: 14-6–2
- Home record: 8–5–0
- Road record: 6–1–2
- Goals for: 60
- Goals against: 53

Team information
- General manager: Jim Nill
- Coach: Glen Gulutzan
- Captain: Jamie Benn
- Alternate captains: Miro Heiskanen; Roope Hintz; Esa Lindell; Tyler Seguin
- Arena: American Airlines Center
- Minor league affiliates: Texas Stars (AHL); Idaho Steelheads (ECHL)

Team leaders
- Goals: Mikko Rantanen; Jason Robertson (10)
- Assists: Mikko Rantanen (16)
- Points: Mikko Rantanen (26)
- Penalty minutes: Jamie Benn (25)
- Plus/minus: Jaosn Robertson (+12)
- Wins: Jake Oettinger (11)
- Goals against average: Jake Oettinger (2.22)

The 2026–27 Dallas Stars season is the 60th season (59th season of play) for the National Hockey League (NHL) franchise that was established on June 5, 1967, and the 34th season since the franchise relocated from Minnesota prior to the start of the 1993–94 season.

== Standings ==
=== Divisional standings ===
Central Division
| Pos | Team | GP | W | L | OTL | RW | GF | GA | GD | Pts |
|---|---|---|---|---|---|---|---|---|---|---|
| 1 | Minnesota Wild | 24 | 17 | 3 | 4 | 16 | 87 | 52 | +35 | 38 |
| 2 | Dallas Stars | 22 | 14 | 6 | 2 | 8 | 64 | 56 | +8 | 30 |
| 3 | Colorado Avalanche | 23 | 13 | 7 | 3 | 13 | 90 | 68 | +22 | 29 |
| 4 | Nashville Predators | 22 | 11 | 6 | 5 | 8 | 67 | 66 | +1 | 27 |
| 5 | Utah Mammoth | 23 | 11 | 9 | 3 | 9 | 77 | 79 | −2 | 25 |
| 6 | Winnipeg Jets | 23 | 11 | 9 | 3 | 8 | 71 | 77 | −6 | 25 |
| 7 | St. Louis Blues | 22 | 11 | 9 | 2 | 10 | 68 | 67 | +1 | 24 |
| 8 | Chicago Blackhawks | 22 | 6 | 14 | 2 | 4 | 54 | 90 | −36 | 14 |

Updated to game(s) played on November 19, 2026. Source: National Hockey League
Rules for classification: 1) Fewer number of games played (GP, only during regular season); 2) Greater number of regulation wins (RW); 3) Greater number of wins in regulation and overtime, excluding shootout wins (ROW); 4) Greater number of total wins, including shootouts (W); 5) Greater number of points earned in head-to-head play; if teams played an uneven number of head-to-head games, the result of the first game on the home ice of the team with the extra home game is discarded; 6) Greater goal differential (GD); 7) Greater number of goals scored (GF)

=== Conference standings ===
Western Conference Wild Card
| Pos | Div | Team | GP | W | L | OTL | RW | GF | GA | GD | Pts |
|---|---|---|---|---|---|---|---|---|---|---|---|
| 1 | CE | Nashville Predators | 22 | 11 | 6 | 5 | 8 | 67 | 66 | +1 | 27 |
| 2 | CE | Utah Mammoth | 23 | 11 | 9 | 3 | 9 | 77 | 79 | −2 | 25 |
| 3 | CE | Winnipeg Jets | 23 | 11 | 9 | 3 | 8 | 71 | 77 | −6 | 25 |
| 4 | CE | St. Louis Blues | 22 | 11 | 9 | 2 | 10 | 68 | 67 | +1 | 24 |
| 5 | PA | San Jose Sharks | 24 | 10 | 12 | 2 | 3 | 65 | 86 | −21 | 22 |
| 6 | PA | Seattle Kraken | 19 | 10 | 8 | 1 | 7 | 64 | 67 | −3 | 21 |
| 7 | PA | Calgary Flames | 23 | 10 | 12 | 1 | 9 | 57 | 80 | −23 | 21 |
| 8 | PA | Los Angeles Kings | 20 | 7 | 11 | 2 | 4 | 56 | 66 | −10 | 16 |
| 9 | CE | Chicago Blackhawks | 22 | 6 | 14 | 2 | 4 | 54 | 90 | −36 | 14 |
| 10 | PA | Vancouver Canucks | 24 | 5 | 18 | 1 | 3 | 67 | 105 | −38 | 11 |

Updated to game(s) played on November 19, 2026. Source: National Hockey League
Rules for classification: 1) Fewer number of games played (GP, only during regular season); 2) Greater number of regulation wins (RW); 3) Greater number of wins in regulation and overtime, excluding shootout wins (ROW); 4) Greater number of total wins, including shootouts (W); 5) Greater number of points earned in head-to-head play; if teams played an uneven number of head-to-head games, the result of the first game on the home ice of the team with the extra home game is discarded; 6) Greater goal differential (GD); 7) Greater number of goals scored (GF)

== Schedule and results ==
=== Preseason ===
The Stars preseason schedule was released on July 6, 2026.

2026 preseason game log: 4–0–0 (Home: 2–0–0; Road: 2–0–0)

| # | Date | Visitor | Score 2-1 | Home | OT | Decision | Location | Attendance | Record |
|---|---|---|---|---|---|---|---|---|---|
| 1 | September 19 | Dallas | 2–1 | St. Louis | | Poirier | Enterprise Center | 16,314 | 1–0–0 |
| 2 | September 21 | St. Louis | 1–2 | Dallas | | DeSmith | American Airlines Center | 14,614 | 2–0–0 |
| 3 | September 23 | Minnesota | 0–2 | Dallas | | Poirier | American Airlines Center | 14,991 | 3–0–0 |
| 4 | September 25 | Dallas | 2–1 | Minnesota | | DeSmith | Grand Casino Arena | 15,645 | 4–0–0 |

Legend:

Win Loss OT/SO Loss

=== Regular season ===
The Stars regular season schedule was released on July 16, 2026.

2026–27 game log
(Home: 8–5–0 = 16 Points; Away: 6–1–2 = 14 Points)
October: 8–5–1 (Home: 5–4–0; Road: 3-1–1 = 17 Points)

| # | Date | Visitor | Score | Home | OT | Decision | Location | Attendance | Record | Points | Recap |
|---|---|---|---|---|---|---|---|---|---|---|---|
| 1 | October 2 | St. Louis | 4–0 | Dallas | | Oettinger | American Airlines Center | 18,532 | 0–1–0 | 0 | |
| 2 | October 3 | Dallas | 1–2 | Nashville | | DeSmith | Bridgestone Arena | 17,260 | 0–2–0 | 0 | |
| 3 | October 5 | San Jose | 0–5 | Dallas | | Oettinger | American Airlines Center | 18,532 | 1–2–0 | 2 | |
| 4 | October 8 | Dallas | 4–0 | Buffalo | | Oettinger | KeyBank Center | 19,070 | 2–2–0 | 4 | |
| 5 | October 10 | Dallas | 1–2 | Pittsburgh | SO | Oettinger | PPG Paints Arena | 18,192 | 2–2–1 | 5 | |
| 6 | October 13 | Colorado | 3–2 | Dallas | | Oettinger | American Airlines Center | 18,532 | 2–3–1 | 5 | |
| 7 | October 14 | Dallas | 3–2 | Colorado | SO | DeSmith | Ball Arena | 18,107 | 3–3–1 | 7 | |
| 8 | October 17 | Dallas | 4–0 | Chicago | | Oettinger | United Center | 18,233 | 4–3–1 | 9 | |
| 9 | October 20 | Boston | 2–3 | Dallas | OT | Oettinger | American Airlines Center | 18,532 | 5–3–1 | 11 | |
| 10 | October 22 | Winnipeg | 2–3 | Dallas | OT | Oettinger | American Airlines Center | 18,532 | 6–3–1 | 13 | |
| 11 | October 25 | NY Islanders | 3–6 | Dallas | | Oettinger | American Airlines Center | 18,532 | 7–3–1 | 15 | |
| 12 | October 27 | New Jersey | 5–1 | Dallas | | DeSmith | American Airlines Center | 18,532 | 7–4–1 | 15 | |
| 13 | October 29 | Montreal | 5–2 | Dallas | | Oettinger | American Airlines Center | 18,532 | 7–5–1 | 15 | |
| 14 | October 31 | Columbus | 1–3 | Dallas | | Oettinger | American Airlines Center | 18,532 | 8–5–1 | 17 | |

November: 6–1–1 (Home: 3–1–0; Road: 3–0–1 = 13 Points)

| # | Date | Visitor | Score | Home | OT | Decision | Location | Attendance | Record | Points | Recap |
|---|---|---|---|---|---|---|---|---|---|---|---|
| 15 | November 3 | Dallas | 6–5 | Washington | | Oettinger | Capital One Arena | 16,956 | 9–5–1 | 19 | |
| 16 | November 5 | Dallas | 1–2 | Columbus | SO | DeSmith | Nationwide Arena | 15,020 | 9–5–2 | 20 | |
| 17 | November 7 | San Jose | 3–4 | Dallas | | Oettinger | American Airlines Center | 18,532 | 10–5–2 | 22 | |
| 18 | November 12 | Winnipeg | 8–3 | Dallas | | Oettinger | American Airlines Center | 18,532 | 10–6–2 | 22 | |
| 19 | November 14 | Buffalo | 0–2 | Dallas | | Oettinger | American Airlines Center | 18,532 | 11–6–2 | 24 | |
| 20 | November 15 | Florida | 1–2 | Dallas | OT | DeSmith | American Airlines Center | 18,532 | 12–6–2 | 26 | |
| 21 | November 17 | Dallas | 4–3 | Vegas | OT | Oettinger | T-Mobile Arena | 16,242 | 13–6–2 | 28 | |
| 22 | November 19 | Dallas | 4-3 | Vegas | SO | | T-Mobile Arena | | 14–6–2 | 30 | |
| 23 | November 22 | Pittsburgh | – | Dallas | | | American Airlines Center | | 0–0–0 | | |
| 24 | November 25 | Nashville | – | Dallas | | | American Airlines Center | | 0–0–0 | | |
| 25 | November 27 | Dallas | – | St. Louis | | | Enterprise Center | | 0–0–0 | | |
| 26 | November 28 | Utah | – | Dallas | | | American Airlines Center | | 0–0–0 | | |

December: 0–0–0 (Home: 0–0–0; Road: 0–0–0 = 0 Points)

| # | Date | Visitor | Score | Home | OT | Decision | Location | Attendance | Record | Points | Recap |
|---|---|---|---|---|---|---|---|---|---|---|---|
| 27 | December 1 | Dallas | – | Seattle | | | Climate Pledge Arena | | 0–0–0 | | |
| 28 | December 3 | Dallas | – | Seattle | | | Climate Pledge Arena | | 0–0–0 | | |
| 29 | December 5 | Dallas | – | Vancouver | | | Rogers Arena | | 0–0–0 | | |
| 30 | December 9 | Toronto | – | Dallas | | | American Airlines Center | | 0–0–0 | | |
| 31 | December 12 | St. Louis | – | Dallas | | | American Airlines Center | | 0–0–0 | | |
| 32 | December 15 | Washington | – | Dallas | | | American Airlines Center | | 0–0–0 | | |
| 33 | December 17 | Dallas | – | Edmonton | | | Rogers Place | | 0–0–0 | | |
| 34 | December 19 | Dallas | – | Winnipeg | | | Canada Life Centre | | 0–0–0 | | |
| 35 | December 20 | Dallas | – | Winnipeg | | | Canada Life Centre | | 0–0–0 | | |
| 36 | December 22 | Calgary | – | Dallas | | | American Airlines Center | | 0–0–0 | | |
| 37 | December 27 | Dallas | – | Montreal | | | Bell Centre | | 0–0–0 | | |
| 38 | December 29 | Dallas | – | Ottawa | | | Canadian Tire Centre | | 0–0–0 | | |
| 39 | December 31 | NY Rangers | – | Dallas | | | American Airlines Center | | 0–0–0 | | |

January: 0–0–0 (Home: 0–0–0; Road: 0–0–0 = 0 Points)

| # | Date | Visitor | Score | Home | OT | Decision | Location | Attendance | Record | Points | Recap |
|---|---|---|---|---|---|---|---|---|---|---|---|
| 40 | January 2 | Chicago | – | Dallas | | | American Airlines Center | | 0–0–0 | | |
| 41 | January 4 | Detroit | – | Dallas | | | American Airlines Center | | 0–0–0 | | |
| 42 | January 6 | Dallas | – | San Jose | | | SAP Center | | 0–0–0 | | |
| 43 | January 8 | Dallas | – | Anaheim | | | Honda Center | | 0–0–0 | | |
| 44 | January 9 | Dallas | – | Los Angeles | | | Crypto.com Arena | | 0–0–0 | | |
| 45 | January 12 | Ottawa | – | Dallas | | | American Airlines Center | | 0–0–0 | | |
| 46 | January 14 | Dallas | – | Boston | | | TD Garden | | 0–0–0 | | |
| 47 | January 15 | Dallas | – | NY Islanders | | | UBS Arena | | 0–0–0 | | |
| 48 | January 17 | Dallas | – | NY Rangers | | | Madison Square Garden | | 0–0–0 | | |
| 49 | January 19 | Dallas | – | New Jersey | | | Prudential Center | | 0–0–0 | | |
| 50 | January 20 | Dallas | – | Chicago | | | United Center | | 0–0–0 | | |
| 51 | January 22 | Colorado | – | Dallas | | | American Airlines Center | | 0–0–0 | | |
| 52 | January 24 | Dallas | – | Colorado | | | Ball Arena | | 0–0–0 | | |
| 53 | January 26 | Anaheim | – | Dallas | | | American Airlines Center | | 0–0–0 | | |
| 54 | January 28 | Vancouver | – | Dallas | | | American Airlines Center | | 0–0–0 | | |
| 55 | January 30 | Dallas | – | Minnesota | | | Grand Casino Arena | | 0–0–0 | | |

February: 0–0–0 (Home: 0–0–0; Road: 0–0–0 = 0 Points)

| # | Date | Visitor | Score | Home | OT | Decision | Location | Attendance | Record | Points | Recap |
|---|---|---|---|---|---|---|---|---|---|---|---|
| 56 | February 8 | Los Angeles | – | Dallas | | | American Airlines Center | | 0–0–0 | | |
| 57 | February 12 | Dallas | – | Tampa Bay | | | Benchmark International Arena | | 0–0–0 | | |
| 58 | February 13 | Dallas | – | Florida | | | Amerant Bank Arena | | 0–0–0 | | |
| 59 | February 16 | Minnesota | – | Dallas | | | American Airlines Center | | 0–0–0 | | |
| 60 | February 18 | Philadelphia | – | Dallas | | | American Airlines Center | | 0–0–0 | | |
| 61 | February 20 | Vegas | – | Dallas | | | AT&T Stadium | (outdoors) | 0–0–0 | | |
| 62 | February 23 | Vancouver | – | Dallas | | | American Airlines Center | | 0–0–0 | | |
| 63 | February 25 | Tampa Bay | – | Dallas | | | American Airlines Center | | 0–0–0 | | |
| 64 | February 27 | Edmonton | – | Dallas | | | American Airlines Center | | 0–0–0 | | |
| 65 | February 28 | Dallas | – | St. Louis | | | Enterprise Center | | 0–0–0 | | |

March: 0–0–0 (Home: 0–0–0; Road: 0–0–0 = 0 Points)

| # | Date | Visitor | Score | Home | OT | Decision | Location | Attendance | Record | Points | Recap |
|---|---|---|---|---|---|---|---|---|---|---|---|
| 66 | March 3 | Minnesota | – | Dallas | | | American Airlines Center | | 0–0–0 | | |
| 67 | March 5 | Dallas | – | Philadelphia | | | Xfinity Mobile Arena | | 0–0–0 | | |
| 68 | March 6 | Dallas | – | Detroit | | | Little Caesars Arena | | 0–0–0 | | |
| 69 | March 8 | Dallas | – | Toronto | | | Scotiabank Arena | | 0–0–0 | | |
| 70 | March 10 | Anaheim | – | Dallas | | | American Airlines Center | | 0–0–0 | | |
| 71 | March 13 | Dallas | – | Los Angeles | | | Crypto.com Arena | | 0–0–0 | | |
| 72 | March 15 | Dallas | – | Utah | | | Delta Center | | 0–0–0 | | |
| 73 | March 17 | Dallas | – | Calgary | | | Scotiabank Saddledome | | 0–0–0 | | |
| 74 | March 20 | Dallas | – | Edmonton | | | Rogers Place | | 0–0–0 | | |
| 75 | March 23 | Carolina | – | Dallas | | | American Airlines Center | | 0–0–0 | | |
| 76 | March 25 | Dallas | – | Carolina | | | Lenovo Center | | 0–0–0 | | |
| 77 | March 27 | Nashville | – | Dallas | | | American Airlines Center | | 0–0–0 | | |
| 78 | March 30 | Calgary | – | Dallas | | | American Airlines Center | | 0–0–0 | | |

April: 0–0–0 (Home: 0–0–0; Road: 0–0–0 = 0 Points)

| # | Date | Visitor | Score | Home | OT | Decision | Location | Attendance | Record | Points | Recap |
|---|---|---|---|---|---|---|---|---|---|---|---|
| 79 | April 2 | Dallas | – | Minnesota | | | Grand Casino Arena | | 0–0–0 | | |
| 80 | April 3 | Chicago | – | Dallas | | | American Airlines Center | | 0–0–0 | | |
| 81 | April 5 | Seattle | – | Dallas | | | American Airlines Center | | 0–0–0 | | |
| 82 | April 7 | Dallas | – | Utah | | | Delta Center | | 0–0–0 | | |
| 83 | April 9 | Utah | – | Dallas | | | American Airlines Center | | 0–0–0 | | |
| 84 | April 10 | Dallas | – | Nashville | | | Bridgestone Arena | | 0–0–0 | | |

Win Loss OT/SO Loss

== Roster ==
Updated November 9, 2026

| No. | Nat | Player | Pos | S/G | Age | Acquired | Birthplace |
|---|---|---|---|---|---|---|---|
| 10 | (Sweden) | Oskar Bäck | C | L | 26 | 2018 | Karlstad, Sweden |
| 14 | (Canada) | Jamie Benn (C) | LW | L | 37 | 2007 | Victoria, British Columbia |
| 6 | (Switzerland) | Lian Bichsel | D | L | 22 | 2022 | Olten, Switzerland |
| 15 | (United States) | Colin Blackwell | C | R | 33 | 2024 | North Andover, Massachusetts |
| 20 | (Canada) | Kyle Capobianco | D | L | 29 | 2024 | Mississauga, Ontario |
| 1 | (United States) | Casey DeSmith | G | L | 35 | 2024 | Rochester, New Hampshire |
| 95 | (Canada) | Matt Duchene | C | L | 35 | 2023 | Haliburton, Ontario |
| 12 | (Czech Republic) | Radek Faksa | C | L | 32 | 2025 | Vitkov, Czech Republic |
| 55 | (Canada) | Thomas Harley | D | L | 25 | 2019 | Syracuse, New York |
| 4 | (Finland) | Miro Heiskanen (A) | D | L | 27 | 2017 | Espoo, Finland |
| 24 | (Finland) | Roope Hintz (A) | C/LW | L | 30 | 2015 | Tampere, Finland |
| 49 | (Canada) | Justin Hryckowian | C | L | 25 | 2024 | L'Île-Bizard, Quebec |
| 25 | (Finland) | Arttu Hyry | RW | R | 25 | 2024 | Oulu, Finland |
| 53 | (Canada) | Wyatt Johnston | C | R | 23 | 2021 | Toronto, Ontario |
| 22 | (Finland) | Joel Kiviranta | LW | L | 30 | 2026 | Vantaa, Finland |
| 23 | (Finland) | Esa Lindell (A) | D | L | 32 | 2012 | Helsinki, Finland |
| 5 | (Sweden) | Nils Lundkvist | D | R | 26 | 2022 | Piteå, Sweden |
| 57 | (Canada) | Tyler Myers | D | R | 36 | 2026 | Houston, Texas |
| 29 | (United States) | Jake Oettinger | G | L | 27 | 2017 | Lakeville, Minnesota |
| 16 | (Canada) | David Perron | RW | R | 38 | 2026 | Sherbrooke, Quebec |
| 31 | (Canada) | Rémi Poirier | G | L | 25 | 2026 | Farnham, Quebec |
| 96 | (Finland) | Mikko Rantanen | RW | L | 30 | 2025 | Nousiainen, Finland |
| 21 | (United States) | Jason Robertson | LW | L | 27 | 2017 | Arcadia, California |
| 91 | (Canada) | Tyler Seguin (A) | C | R | 34 | 2013 | Brampton, Ontario |
| 18 | (Canada) | Sam Steel | C | L | 28 | 2023 | Ardrossan, Alberta |

== Player statistics ==
Updated as of November 3, 2026

=== Skaters ===
Regular season
| Player | GP | G | A | Pts | +/– | PIM |
|---|---|---|---|---|---|---|
| Mikko Rantanen | 15 | 8 | 10 | 18 | +6 | 12 |
| Jason Robertson | 15 | 8 | 10 | 18 | +7 | 2 |
| Roope Hintz | 15 | 6 | 7 | 13 | +9 | 9 |
| Wyatt Johnston | 13 | 3 | 10 | 13 | +2 | 0 |
| Miro Heiskanen | 15 | 3 | 8 | 11 | +2 | 10 |
| Thomas Harley | 15 | 1 | 7 | 8 | +3 | 10 |
| Arttu Hyry | 15 | 4 | 2 | 6 | +2 | 7 |
| Tyler Seguin | 15 | 3 | 3 | 6 | −5 | 8 |
| Jamie Benn | 15 | 2 | 4 | 6 | +2 | 19 |
| Joel Kiviranta | 11 | 2 | 1 | 3 | +1 | 0 |
| Sam Steel | 13 | 1 | 2 | 3 | −2 | 6 |
| Nils Lundkvist | 15 | 0 | 3 | 3 | 0 | 10 |
| Justin Hryckowian | 15 | 2 | 0 | 2 | −3 | 2 |
| Tyler Myers | 15 | 0 | 2 | 2 | +2 | 6 |
| Radek Faksa | 11 | 0 | 2 | 2 | +1 | 7 |
| Colin Blackwell | 12 | 0 | 1 | 1 | −5 | 2 |
| Esa Lindell | 10 | 0 | 1 | 1 | +5 | 2 |
| Oskar Bäck | 7 | 0 | 1 | 1 | 0 | 2 |
| Lian Bichsel | 15 | 0 | 1 | 1 | −3 | 12 |
| David Perron | 2 | 0 | 0 | 0 | +1 | 0 |
| Kyle Capobianco | 5 | 0 | 0 | 0 | 0 | 4 |
| Matthew Seminoff | 3 | 0 | 0 | 0 | −2 | 0 |
| Trey Taylor | 1 | 0 | 0 | 0 | 0 | 0 |
| Dylan Hryckowian | 2 | 0 | 0 | 0 | −1 | 0 |

=== Goaltenders ===
Regular season
| Player | GP | GS | TOI | W | L | OT | GA | GAA | SA | SV% | SO | G | A | PIM |
|---|---|---|---|---|---|---|---|---|---|---|---|---|---|---|
| Jake Oettinger | 12 | 12 | 724:16 | 8 | 3 | 1 | 23 | 1.91 | 254 | .909 | 3 | 0 | 0 | 0 |
| Casey DeSmith | 3 | 3 | 183:24 | 1 | 2 | 0 | 9 | 2.94 | 80 | .888 | 3 | 0 | 0 | 2 |

^{†}Denotes player spent time with another team before joining the Stars. Stats reflect time with the Stars only.
^{‡}Denotes player was traded mid-season. Stats reflect time with the Stars only.
Bold/italics denotes franchise record.

== Transactions ==
The Stars have been involved in the following transactions during the 2026-27 season.

Key:

† Contract is entry-level.
‡ Contract initially takes effect in the 2026-27 season.

=== Trades ===
| Date | Details | Ref |

=== Players acquired ===
| Date | Player | Former team | Term | Via | Ref |

=== Players lost ===
| Date | Player | New team | Term | Via | Ref |

=== Signings ===
| Date | Player | Term | Ref |

== Milestones ==
Regular season
| Player | Milestone | Reached |

== Draft picks ==
Below are the Dallas Stars selections at the 2026 NHL entry draft, which was held on June 26 and 27, 2026, at the KeyBank Center in Buffalo, New York.

| Round | # | Player | Pos | Nationality | College/Junior/Club team | League |
|---|---|---|---|---|---|---|
| 2 | 59 | Jakub Vanecek | D | Czechia | Tri-City Americans | WHL |
| 5 | 155 | Ryan Brown | LW | Canada | London Knights | OHL |
| 6 | 187 | Anton Emil Wilde Larsen | G | Denmark | Frederikshavn White Hawks | Metal Ligaen |
| 7 | 197 | Jasper Kuhta | C | Finland | Ottawa 67's | OHL |
| 7 | 219 | Mikhail Cherepanov | D | Russia | New Hampshire Mountain Kings | NAHL |
