= 2026–27 Buffalo Sabres season =

National Hockey League season

2026–27 Buffalo Sabres
- Division: 6th Atlantic
- Conference: 11th Eastern
- 2026–27 record: 9–10–4
- Home record: 4–6–0
- Road record: 5–4–4
- Goals for: 67
- Goals against: 81

Team information
- General manager: Jarmo Kekäläinen
- Coach: Lindy Ruff
- Captain: Rasmus Dahlin
- Alternate captains: Mattias Samuelsson; Tage Thompson
- Arena: KeyBank Center
- Minor league affiliates: Rochester Americans (AHL); TBA (ECHL)

Team leaders
- Goals: Tage Thompson (15)
- Assists: Zach Benson (15)
- Points: Tage Thompson (26)
- Penalty minutes: Mattias Samuelsson (27)
- Plus/minus: Zach Benson (+12)
- Wins: Ukko-Pekka Luukkonen (6)
- Goals against average: Alex Lyon (3.30)

The 2026–27 Buffalo Sabres season is the 57th season of play for the Sabres in the National Hockey League (NHL). It is their third season since head coach Lindy Ruff returned to the team and second since general manager Jarmo Kekäläinen was hired.

The Sabres look to improve on their 50–23–9 record.

== Season summary ==
=== Off-season ===
After exceeding expectations and breaking their 14-season playoff drought, Lindy Ruff was signed to a 2-year contract extension on May 20, 2026. During this time, the Jacksonville Icemen ended their agreement with the Sabres and became the ECHL affiliate for the Minnesota Wild.

Several players were traded to other teams during or around the 2026 NHL entry draft, which took place in Buffalo. Michael Kesselring was traded to the San Jose Sharks, while Bowen Byram and Jordan Greenway were traded to the Chicago Blackhawks. Only a few hours before the deadline to submit qualifying offers to restricted free agents, Peyton Krebs and Olen Zellweger were both given extended qualifying offers. On the same day, Beck Malenstyn was extended for 6 years for a total of $17.5 million. One day after the draft, team captain Alex Tuch, who was not re-signed in free agency, would sign with the Washington Capitals on an 8-year contract with $84 million dollars. Zellweger was eventually signed to a three-year contract, worth $3.1 million a year, on July 1. Only a few hours later, fourth string goalie Devon Levi and a 2028 seventh-round pick were traded to the Edmonton Oilers for a 2028 third-round pick.

As part of a new collective bargaining agreement taking effect for 2026–27 NHL season, all teams must hire a permanent emergency back-up goaltender (EBUG) who may travel with the team; the Sabres hired Jack McNaughton as their EBUG on August 14.

=== Regular season ===
The team started the season riddled with injuries, with starting goaltender Alex Lyon, forward Jason Zucker, centre Tyson Kozak, centre Sam Carrick, centre Jiří Kulich, forward Justin Danforth, defenseman Conor Timmins, and team captain Rasmus Dahlin suffering injuries that sidelined them for multiple weeks during the beginning of the season. By the end of October, the team had come back from multiple-goal third-period deficits four games in a row, going 2–0–2 in that stretch, and five times overall, with a record of 3–0–2.

Colten Ellis recorded his second career shutout on October 27, 2026. The game, which was against the San Jose Sharks, resulted in a 2–0 road win.

== Schedule and results ==
=== Preseason ===
The preseason schedule was published on June 23, 2026.

2026 preseason game log: 1–2–1 (Home: 1–1–0; Road: 0–1–1)
#	Date	Visitor	Score	Home	OT	Decision	Attendance	Record	Recap
1	September 21	Buffalo	1–4	Pittsburgh		Lyon	11,947	0–1–0
2	September 22	Columbus	1–5	Buffalo		Luukkonen	16,328	1–1–0
3	September 24	Buffalo	2–3	Detroit	OT	Ellis	15,887	1–1–1
4	September 26	Pittsburgh	3–1	Buffalo		Luukkonen	16,078	1–2–1

=== Regular season ===
The regular season schedule was published on July 16, 2026.

2026–27 game log

October: 7–4–3: 17 points (Home: 3–3–0; Road: 4–1–3)
#	Date	Visitor	Score	Home	OT	Decision	Logo	Attendance	Record	Points	Recap
1	October 1	Buffalo	3–6	Columbus		Luukkonen (0–1–0)	Main	18,207	0–1–0	0
2	October 3	Chicago	3–4	Buffalo		Luukkonen (1–1–0)	Main	19,070	1–1–0	2
3	October 6	Minnesota	2–3	Buffalo	OT	Ellis (1–0–0)	Main	19,070	2–1–0	4
4	October 8	Dallas	4–0	Buffalo		Luukkonen (1–2–0)	Main	19,070	2–2–0	4
5	October 10	Utah	4–1	Buffalo		Ellis (1–1–0)	Alt	19,070	2–3–0	4
6	October 12	Florida	3–5	Buffalo		Luukkonen (2–2–0)	Main	19,070	3–3–0	6
7	October 13	Buffalo	3–4	Montreal	SO	Luukkonen (2–2–1)	Main	20,962	3–3–1	7
8	October 15	Buffalo	5–4	Toronto	OT	Luukkonen (3–2–1)	Main	18,886	4–3–1	9
9	October 17	Buffalo	3–4	Montreal	OT	Luukkonen (3–2–2)	Main	20,962	4–3–2	10
10	October 21	Philadelphia	3–1	Buffalo		Luukkonen (3–3–2)	Main	19,070	4–4–2	10
11	October 24	Buffalo	3–4	Washington	OT	Luukkonen (3–3–3)	Main	18,347	4–4–3	11
12	October 27	Buffalo	2–0	San Jose		Ellis (2–1–0)	Main	14,900	5–4–3	13
13	October 29	Buffalo	7–6	Anaheim		Ellis (3–1–0)	Main	15,575	6–4–3	15
14	October 31	Buffalo	3–2	Los Angeles		Luukkonen (4–3–3)	Main	16,161	7–4–3	17

November: 2–6–1: 5 points (Home: 1–3–0; Road: 1–3–1)
#	Date	Visitor	Score	Home	OT	Decision	Logo	Attendance	Record	Points	Recap
15	November 4	Ottawa	2–1	Buffalo		Ellis (3–2–0)	Remix	19,070	7–5–3	17
16	November 6	Columbus	2–5	Buffalo		Luukkonen (5–3–3)	Main	19,070	8–5–3	19
17	November 8	Vegas	4–1	Buffalo		Ellis (3–3–0)	Alt	19,070	8–6–3	19
18	November 11	Tampa Bay	8–3	Buffalo		Luukkonen (5–4–3)	Main	19,070	8–7–3	19
19	November 12	Buffalo	2–3	Chicago	OT	Lyon (0–0–1)	Main	18,305	8–7–4	20
20	November 14	Buffalo	0–2	Dallas		Lyon (0–1–1)	Main	18,532	8–8–4	20
21	November 17	Buffalo	3–4	Philadelphia		Lyon (0–2–1)	Main	18,457	8–9–4	20
22	November 19	Buffalo	6–3	Washington		Luukkonen (6–4–3)	Main	18,347	9–9–4	22
23	November 21	Buffalo	3–4	Florida		Lyon (0–3–1)	Main	19,571	9–10–4	22
24	November 22	Buffalo	–	Tampa Bay
25	November 25	NY Rangers	–	Buffalo
26	November 27	Pittsburgh	–	Buffalo

December: 0–0–0: 0 points (Home: 0–0–0; Road: 0–0–0)
#	Date	Visitor	Score	Home	OT	Decision	Logo	Attendance	Record	Points	Recap
27	December 1	Buffalo	–	Edmonton
28	December 3	Buffalo	–	Calgary
29	December 4	Buffalo	–	Vancouver
30	December 6	Buffalo	–	Seattle
31	December 10	Edmonton	–	Buffalo
32	December 12	Anaheim	–	Buffalo
33	December 14	Buffalo	–	Ottawa
34	December 15	Calgary	–	Buffalo
35	December 18	Montreal	–	Buffalo
36	December 20	Los Angeles	–	Buffalo
37	December 22	Buffalo	–	Pittsburgh
38	December 26	New Jersey	–	Buffalo
39	December 28	Detroit	–	Buffalo
40	December 30	Buffalo	–	Florida

January: 0–0–0: 0 points (Home: 0–0–0; Road: 0–0–0)
#	Date	Visitor	Score	Home	OT	Decision	Logo	Attendance	Record	Points	Recap
41	January 2	Buffalo	–	Tampa Bay
42	January 4	Winnipeg	–	Buffalo
43	January 5	Buffalo	–	Boston
44	January 8	Buffalo	–	Columbus
45	January 9	Carolina	–	Buffalo
46	January 12	New Jersey	–	Buffalo
47	January 14	Colorado	–	Buffalo
48	January 16	Nashville	–	Buffalo
49	January 18	Montreal	–	Buffalo
50	January 20	Buffalo	–	NY Islanders
51	January 21	Seattle	–	Buffalo
52	January 24	Buffalo	–	Winnipeg
53	January 27	Buffalo	–	Utah
54	January 28	Buffalo	–	Vegas
55	January 30	Buffalo	–	Colorado

February: 0–0–0: 0 points (Home: 0–0–0; Road: 0–0–0)
#	Date	Visitor	Score	Home	OT	Decision	Logo	Attendance	Record	Points	Recap
56	February 3	NY Islanders	–	Buffalo
57	February 13	Buffalo	–	Carolina
58	February 15	Buffalo	–	NY Rangers
59	February 18	Carolina	–	Buffalo
60	February 20	Buffalo	–	New Jersey
61	February 21	Buffalo	–	Detroit
62	February 24	Buffalo	–	Philadelphia
63	February 26	Ottawa	–	Buffalo
64	February 27	Toronto	–	Buffalo

March: 0–0–0: 0 points (Home: 0–0–0; Road: 0–0–0)
#	Date	Visitor	Score	Home	OT	Decision	Logo	Attendance	Record	Points	Recap
65	March 2	Pittsburgh	–	Buffalo
66	March 4	St. Louis	–	Buffalo
67	March 6	NY Rangers	–	Buffalo
68	March 7	Buffalo	–	Ottawa
69	March 9	Vancouver	–	Buffalo
70	March 12	Buffalo	–	Detroit
71	March 14	Buffalo	–	Minnesota
72	March 15	San Jose	–	Buffalo
73	March 18	Washington	–	Buffalo
74	March 20	Florida	–	Buffalo
75	March 21	Buffalo	–	NY Islanders
76	March 23	Buffalo	–	Boston
77	March 25	Toronto	–	Buffalo
78	March 28	Buffalo	–	St. Louis
79	March 30	Buffalo	–	Nashville

April: 0–0–0: 0 points (Home: 0–0–0; Road: 0–0–0)
#	Date	Visitor	Score	Home	OT	Decision	Logo	Attendance	Record	Points	Recap
80	April 1	Boston	–	Buffalo
81	April 3	Buffalo	–	Toronto
82	April 5	Tampa Bay	–	Buffalo
83	April 7	Boston	–	Buffalo
84	April 10	Detroit	–	Buffalo

Legend: Win (2 points) Loss (0 points) Overtime/shootout loss (1 point)

== Standings ==
=== Divisional standings ===
Atlantic Division
Pos	Team	GP	W	L	OTL	RW	GF	GA	GD	Pts
1	Tampa Bay Lightning	22	15	5	2	13	82	62	+20	32
2	Montreal Canadiens	23	14	5	4	9	74	67	+7	32
3	Ottawa Senators	23	14	6	3	11	75	68	+7	31
4	Boston Bruins	22	14	7	1	11	76	56	+20	29
5	Florida Panthers	23	12	8	3	10	72	68	+4	27
6	Buffalo Sabres	22	9	9	4	7	64	77	−13	22
7	Detroit Red Wings	22	8	11	3	6	58	68	−10	19
8	Toronto Maple Leafs	24	8	13	3	7	75	86	−11	19

Updated to game(s) played on November 19, 2026. Source: National Hockey League
Rules for classification: 1) Fewer number of games played (GP, only during regular season); 2) Greater number of regulation wins (RW); 3) Greater number of wins in regulation and overtime, excluding shootout wins (ROW); 4) Greater number of total wins, including shootouts (W); 5) Greater number of points earned in head-to-head play; if teams played an uneven number of head-to-head games, the result of the first game on the home ice of the team with the extra home game is discarded; 6) Greater goal differential (GD); 7) Greater number of goals scored (GF)

=== Conference standings ===
Eastern Conference Wild Card
Pos	Div	Team	GP	W	L	OTL	RW	GF	GA	GD	Pts
1	AT	Boston Bruins	22	14	7	1	11	76	56	+20	29
2	AT	Florida Panthers	23	12	8	3	10	72	68	+4	27
3	ME	New York Islanders	21	10	6	5	8	68	61	+7	25
4	AT	Buffalo Sabres	22	9	9	4	7	64	77	−13	22
5	ME	Philadelphia Flyers	25	8	11	6	7	63	85	−22	22
6	ME	Washington Capitals	20	10	10	0	8	67	76	−9	20
7	AT	Detroit Red Wings	22	8	11	3	6	58	68	−10	19
8	AT	Toronto Maple Leafs	24	8	13	3	7	75	86	−11	19
9	ME	Columbus Blue Jackets	20	8	12	0	3	50	65	−15	16
10	ME	Pittsburgh Penguins	21	7	12	2	3	64	76	−12	16

Updated to game(s) played on November 19, 2026. Source: National Hockey League
Rules for classification: 1) Fewer number of games played (GP, only during regular season); 2) Greater number of regulation wins (RW); 3) Greater number of wins in regulation and overtime, excluding shootout wins (ROW); 4) Greater number of total wins, including shootouts (W); 5) Greater number of points earned in head-to-head play; if teams played an uneven number of head-to-head games, the result of the first game on the home ice of the team with the extra home game is discarded; 6) Greater goal differential (GD); 7) Greater number of goals scored (GF)

== Roster ==
Updated November 19, 2026

No.	Nat	Player	Pos	S/G	Age	Acquired	Birthplace
6	(Canada)	Zach Benson	LW	L	21	2023	Langley, British Columbia
10	(Canada)	Sam Carrick	C	R	34	2026	Markham, Ontario
46	(Canada)	Louis Crevier	D	R	25	2026	Quebec City, Quebec
26	(Sweden)	Rasmus Dahlin (C)	D	L	26	2018	Trollhättan, Sweden
15	(Canada)	Justin Danforth	RW	R	33	2025	Oshawa, Ontario
91	(United States)	Josh Doan	RW	R	24	2025	Scottsdale, Arizona
92	(Canada)	Colten Ellis	G	L	26	2025	River Denys, Nova Scotia
24	(United States)	Matt Grzelcyk	D	L	32	2026	Boston, Massachusetts
94	(Finland)	Konsta Helenius	C	R	20	2024	Ylöjärvi, Finland
48	(Canada)	Tyson Kozak	C	L	23	2021	Souris, Manitoba
19	(Canada)	Peyton Krebs	C	L	25	2021	Okotoks, Alberta
20	(Czech Republic)	Jiří Kulich	C	L	22	2022	Kadaň, Czech Republic
1	(Finland)	Ukko-Pekka Luukkonen	G	L	27	2017	Espoo, Finland
34	(United States)	Alex Lyon	G	L	33	2025	Baudette, Minnesota
29	(Canada)	Beck Malenstyn	LW	L	28	2024	Delta, British Columbia
71	(Canada)	Ryan McLeod	C	L	27	2024	Mississauga, Ontario
73	(United States)	Zach Metsa	D	R	28	2025	Delafield, Wisconsin
9	(United States)	Josh Norris	C	L	27	2025	Oxford, Michigan
86	(Sweden)	Noah Östlund	C	L	22	2022	Nykvarn, Sweden
25	(Canada)	Owen Power	D	L	24	2021	Mississauga, Ontario
22	(Canada)	Jack Quinn	RW	R	25	2020	Ottawa, Ontario
23	(United States)	Mattias Samuelsson (A)	D	L	26	2018	Philadelphia, Pennsylvania
72	(United States)	Tage Thompson (A)	C	R	29	2018	Phoenix, Arizona
21	(Canada)	Conor Timmins	D	R	28	2025	St. Catharines, Ontario
8	(Canada)	Olen Zellweger	D	L	23	2026	Calgary, Alberta
17	(United States)	Jason Zucker	LW	L	34	2024	Newport Beach, California

== Player statistics ==
As of games played on November 21, 2026

=== Skaters ===
Regular season
Player	GP	G	A	Pts	+/−	PIM
Tage Thompson	23	15	11	26	+7	12
Jack Quinn	23	12	11	23	−2	13
Zach Benson	23	3	15	18	+12	22
Owen Power	23	3	14	17	+1	8
Rasmus Dahlin	20	4	10	14	+1	16
Mattias Samuelsson	23	3	10	13	+3	27
Noah Östlund	23	4	8	12	−6	8
Peyton Krebs	23	1	10	11	+6	15
Josh Norris	23	4	3	7	−4	8
Josh Doan	23	4	3	7	−1	8
Olen Zellweger	22	3	4	7	−5	12
Jiří Kulich	15	3	2	5	+2	8
Beck Malenstyn	23	2	2	4	−2	4
Ryan McLeod	19	1	3	4	−8	6
Tyson Kozak	15	1	3	4	−3	6
Konsta Helenius	11	1	2	3	−2	2
Zach Metsa	19	0	3	3	−1	5
Jason Zucker	14	2	0	2	−10	2
Dennis Gilbert	5	1	1	2	+2	6
Sam Carrick	12	0	2	2	−3	9
Conor Timmins	8	0	1	1	−1	2
Louis Crevier	17	0	1	1	−4	8
Matthew Grzelcyk	1	0	0	0	−1	0
Justin Danforth	6	0	0	0	+1	2

=== Goaltenders ===
Regular season
Player	GP	GS	TOI	W	L	OT	GA	GAA	SA	SV%	SO	G	A	PIM
Ukko-Pekka Luukkonen	13	12	743:24	6	4	3	43	3.47	338	.873	0	0	0	0
Colten Ellis	8	7	407:07	3	3	0	23	3.39	181	.873	1	0	0	0
Alex Lyon	4	4	236:24	0	3	1	13	3.30	118	.890	0	0	0	0

^{†}Denotes player spent time with another team before joining the Sabres. Stats reflect time with the Sabres only.
^{‡}Denotes player was traded mid-season. Stats reflect time with the Sabres only.
Bold/italics denotes franchise record.

== Transactions ==
=== Signings ===
Date	Player	Term	Ref
July 1, 2026	Olen Zellweger	2-year	
July 13, 2026	Peyton Krebs	4-year	

== Draft picks ==
Below are the Buffalo Sabres' selections at the 2026 NHL entry draft, which was held on June 26 and 27, 2026, at KeyBank Center in Buffalo, New York.

Round	#	Player	Pos	Nationality	Team (league)
1	4 (Note: The Chicago Blackhawks' first-round pick went to the Buffalo Sabres as the result of a trade on June 23, 2026, that sent Bowen Byram and Jordan Greenway to Chicago in exchange for Louis Crevier, the New York Islanders second-round pick in 2026, and this pick.)	Daxon Rudolph	D	Canada	Prince Albert Raiders (WHL)
1	20 (Note: The Edmonton Oilers' first-round pick went to the Buffalo Sabres as the result of a trade on June 17, 2026, that sent Michael Kesselring and a first-round pick in 2026 (27th overall) to the San Jose Sharks in exchange for this pick.)	Ilia Morozov	C	Russia	Miami RedHawks (NCHC)
4	124	Olivers Murnieks	C	Latvia	Saint John Sea Dogs (QMJHL)
5	156	Domán Szongoth	C	Hungary	KooKoo U20 (U20 SM-sarja)
6	188	Dylan Dumont	RW	Canada	Drummondville Voltigeurs (QMJHL)
