= 2026–27 Colorado Avalanche season =

National Hockey League season

2026–27 Colorado Avalanche
- Division: Central
- Conference: Western
- 2026–27 record: 12–7–3
- Home record: 7–1–2
- Road record: 5–6–1
- Goals for: 86
- Goals against: 68

Team information
- General manager: Joe Sakic
- Coach: Jared Bednar
- Captain: Gabriel Landeskog
- Alternate captains: Nathan MacKinnon; Cale Makar
- Arena: Ball Arena
- Minor league affiliates: Colorado Eagles (AHL); New Mexico Goatheads (ECHL)

Team leaders
- Goals: Artturi Lehkonen (15)
- Assists: Nathan MacKinnon (20)
- Points: Nathan MacKinnon (30)
- Penalty minutes: Fedor Svechkov (27)
- Plus/minus: Devon Toews (+15)
- Wins: Mackenzie Blackwood (11)
- Goals against average: Mackenzie Blackwood (2.56)

The 2026–27 Colorado Avalanche season is the 48th season (47th season of play) for the Avalanche as the National Hockey League (NHL) franchise that joined the league in 1979, and their 31st playing season since the franchise relocated from Quebec City to Denver before the start of the 1995–96 season.

== Standings ==
=== Divisional standings ===
Central Division
Pos	Team	GP	W	L	OTL	RW	GF	GA	GD	Pts
1	Minnesota Wild	23	16	3	4	15	83	51	+32	36
2	Dallas Stars	21	13	6	2	8	60	53	+7	28
3	Colorado Avalanche	22	12	7	3	12	86	68	+18	27
4	Nashville Predators	22	11	6	5	8	67	66	+1	27
5	Utah Mammoth	23	11	9	3	9	77	79	−2	25
6	Winnipeg Jets	22	10	9	3	8	67	74	−7	23
7	St. Louis Blues	21	10	9	2	8	63	65	−2	22
8	Chicago Blackhawks	21	6	13	2	4	52	86	−34	14

Updated to game(s) played on November 18, 2026. Source: National Hockey League
Rules for classification: 1) Fewer number of games played (GP, only during regular season); 2) Greater number of regulation wins (RW); 3) Greater number of wins in regulation and overtime, excluding shootout wins (ROW); 4) Greater number of total wins, including shootouts (W); 5) Greater number of points earned in head-to-head play; if teams played an uneven number of head-to-head games, the result of the first game on the home ice of the team with the extra home game is discarded; 6) Greater goal differential (GD); 7) Greater number of goals scored (GF)

=== Conference standings ===
Western Conference Wild Card
Pos	Div	Team	GP	W	L	OTL	RW	GF	GA	GD	Pts
1	CE	Nashville Predators	22	11	6	5	8	67	66	+1	27
2	CE	Utah Mammoth	23	11	9	3	9	77	79	−2	25
3	CE	Winnipeg Jets	22	10	9	3	8	67	74	−7	23
4	CE	St. Louis Blues	21	10	9	2	9	63	65	−2	22
5	PA	San Jose Sharks	24	10	12	2	3	65	86	−21	22
6	PA	Calgary Flames	22	10	11	1	9	56	76	−20	21
7	PA	Seattle Kraken	18	9	8	1	6	59	66	−7	19
8	PA	Los Angeles Kings	19	6	11	2	4	52	63	−11	14
9	CE	Chicago Blackhawks	21	6	13	2	4	52	86	−34	14
10	PA	Vancouver Canucks	23	5	17	1	3	66	100	−34	11

Updated to game(s) played on November 18, 2026. Source: National Hockey League
Rules for classification: 1) Fewer number of games played (GP, only during regular season); 2) Greater number of regulation wins (RW); 3) Greater number of wins in regulation and overtime, excluding shootout wins (ROW); 4) Greater number of total wins, including shootouts (W); 5) Greater number of points earned in head-to-head play; if teams played an uneven number of head-to-head games, the result of the first game on the home ice of the team with the extra home game is discarded; 6) Greater goal differential (GD); 7) Greater number of goals scored (GF)

== Schedule and results ==
=== Preseason ===
The Avalanche's preseason schedule was released on June 22, 2026.

2026 preseason game log: 2–2–0 (home: 2–0–0; road: 0–2–0)

#	Date	Visitor	Score	Home	OT	Decision	Arena	Attendance	Record	Recap
1	September 20	Utah	1–4	Colorado		Nabokov	Ball Arena	14,403	1–0–0	
2	September 21	Colorado	1–3	Winnipeg		Nabokov	Canada Life Centre	13,363	1–1–0	
3	September 25	Winnipeg	2–5	Colorado		Blackwood	Ball Arena	14,990	2–1–0	
4	September 26	Colorado	0–2	Utah		Wedgewood	Delta Center	14,111	2–2–0	

Legend

Win Loss OT/SO Loss

=== Regular season ===
2026-27 game log

September: 1–0–0 (home: 1–0–0; road: 0–0–0) = 2 points
#	Date	Opponent	Score	OT	Decision	Location	Attendance	Record	Pts	Recap
1	September 30	Los Angeles	8–4		Blackwood	Ball Arena	18,092	1–0–0	2

October: 7–5–1 (home: 5–1–1; road: 2–4–0) = 15 points
#	Date	Opponent	Score	OT	Decision	Location	Attendance	Record	Pts	Recap
2	October 3	St. Louis	6–1		Blackwood	Ball Arena	18,087	2–0–0	4
3	October 7	@ Winnipeg	2–3		Blackwood	Canada Life Centre	14,006	2–1–0	4
4	October 8	@ Calgary	7–3		Wedgewood	Scotiabank Saddledome	16,903	3–1–0	6
5	October 10	Toronto	3–6		Blackwood	Ball Arena	18,091	3–2–0	6
6	October 13	@ Dallas	3–2		Blackwood	American Airlines Center	18,532	4–2–0	8
7	October 14	Dallas	2–3	SO	Wedgewood	Ball Arena	18,107	4–2–1	9
8	October 16	Pittsburgh	5–2		Blackwood	Ball Arena	18,111	5–2–1	11
9	October 19	@ Philadelphia	2–3		Blackwood	Xfinity Mobile Arena	18,353	5–3–1	11
10	October 20	@ New Jersey	3–4		Wedgewood	Prudential Center	15,360	5–4–1	11
11	October 23	Tampa Bay	6–3		Blackwood	Ball Arena	18,104	6–4–1	13
12	October 25	@ Nashville	2–6		Wedgewood	Bridgestone Arena	17,191	6–5–1	13
13	October 28	New Jersey	5–2		Blackwood	Ball Arena	18,101	7–5–1	15
14	October 31	Calgary	5–2		Blackwood	Ball Arena	18,089	8–5–1	17

November: 4–2–2 (home: 1–0–1; road: 3–2–1) = 10 points
#	Date	Opponent	Score	OT	Decision	Location	Attendance	Record	Pts	Recap
15	November 2	@ Chicago	5–2		Blackwood	United Center	17,838	9–5–1	19
16	November 3	@ Columbus	2–7		Wedgewood	Nationwide Arena	14,959	9–6–1	19
17	November 5	Nashville	2–3	OT	Blackwood	Ball Arena	18,085	9–6–2	20
18	November 7	Detroit	4–0		Blackwood	Ball Arena	18,114	10–6–2	22
19	November 10	@ Toronto	6–3		Blackwood	Scotiabank Arena	18,853	11–6–2	24
20	November 12	@ Ottawa	3–4	OT	Wedgewood	Canadian Tire Centre	16,289	11–6–3	25
21	November 14	@ Montreal	4–1		Blackwood	Bell Centre	20,962	12–6–3	27
22	November 18	@ Utah	1–4		Blackwood	Delta Center	14,111	12–7–3	27
23	November 19	Anaheim	–			Ball Arena		0–0–0
24	November 25	Montreal	–			Ball Arena		0–0–0
25	November 27	@ Minnesota	–			Grand Casino Arena		0–0–0
26	November 28	San Jose	–			Ball Arena		0–0–0

December: 0–0–0 (home: 0–0–0; road: 0–0–0) = 0 points
#	Date	Opponent	Score	OT	Decision	Location	Attendance	Record	Pts	Recap
27	December 1	@ Boston	–			TD Garden		0–0–0
28	December 3	@ Detroit	–			Little Caesars Arena		0–0–0
29	December 5	@ NY Rangers	–			Madison Square Garden		0–0–0
30	December 7	@ NY Islanders	–			UBS Arena		0–0–0
31	December 8	@ St. Louis	–			Enterprise Center		0–0–0
32	December 12	Washington	–			Ball Arena		0–0–0
33	December 14	Utah	–			Ball Arena		0–0–0
34	December 16	NY Islanders	–			Ball Arena		0–0–0
35	December 18	Carolina	–			Ball Arena		0–0–0
36	December 20	Seattle	–			Ball Arena		0–0–0
37	December 27	@ Anaheim	–			Honda Center		0–0–0
38	December 29	St. Louis	–			Ball Arena		0–0–0
39	December 31	@ Utah	–			Rice–Eccles Stadium	(outdoors)	0–0–0

January: 0–0–0 (home: 0–0–0; road: 0–0–0) = 0 points
#	Date	Opponent	Score	OT	Decision	Location	Attendance	Record	Pts	Recap
40	January 2	@ Vegas	–			T-Mobile Arena		0–0–0
41	January 4	Vegas	–			Ball Arena		0–0–0
42	January 6	Ottawa	–			Ball Arena		0–0–0
43	January 8	Seattle	–			Ball Arena		0–0–0
44	January 10	Nashville	–			Ball Arena		0–0–0
45	January 12	@ Pittsburgh	–			PPG Paints Arena		0–0–0
46	January 14	@ Buffalo	–			KeyBank Center		0–0–0
47	January 16	@ Washington	–			Capital One Arena		0–0–0
48	January 18	Vancouver	–			Ball Arena		0–0–0
49	January 20	Boston	–			Ball Arena		0–0–0
50	January 22	@ Dallas	–			American Airlines Center		0–0–0
51	January 24	Dallas	–			Ball Arena		0–0–0
52	January 26	Edmonton	–			Ball Arena		0–0–0
53	January 28	@ St. Louis	–			Enterprise Center		0–0–0
54	January 30	Buffalo	–			Ball Arena		0–0–0

February: 0–0–0 (home: 0–0–0; road: 0–0–0) = 0 points
#	Date	Opponent	Score	OT	Decision	Location	Attendance	Record	Pts	Recap
55	February 9	@ Carolina	–			Lenovo Center		0–0–0
56	February 12	@ Florida	–			Amerant Bank Arena		0–0–0
57	February 13	@ Tampa Bay	–			Benchmark International Arena		0–0–0
58	February 15	Columbus	–			Ball Arena		0–0–0
59	February 17	@ Edmonton	–			Rogers Place		0–0–0
60	February 20	@ Vancouver	–			Rogers Arena		0–0–0
61	February 22	Vegas	–			Ball Arena		0–0–0
62	February 25	Winnipeg	–			Ball Arena		0–0–0
63	February 27	Florida	–			Ball Arena		0–0–0
64	February 28	@ Chicago	–			United Center		0–0–0

March: 0–0–0 (home: 0–0–0; road: 0–0–0) = 0 points
#	Date	Opponent	Score	OT	Decision	Location	Attendance	Record	Pts	Recap
65	March 2	@ Nashville	–			Bridgestone Arena		0–0–0
66	March 5	@ San Jose	–			SAP Center		0–0–0
67	March 7	@ Los Angeles	–			Crypto.com Arena		0–0–0
68	March 9	Philadelphia	–			Ball Arena		0–0–0
69	March 11	NY Rangers	–			Ball Arena		0–0–0
70	March 13	Chicago	–			Ball Arena		0–0–0
71	March 15	Edmonton	–			Ball Arena		0–0–0
72	March 17	Minnesota	–			Ball Arena		0–0–0
73	March 19	@ Seattle	–			Climate Pledge Arena		0–0–0
74	March 21	Chicago	–			Ball Arena		0–0–0
75	March 23	Utah	–			Ball Arena		0–0–0
76	March 25	@ Winnipeg	–			Canada Life Centre		0–0–0
77	March 27	Winnipeg	–			Ball Arena		0–0–0
78	March 29	@ San Jose	–			SAP Center		0–0–0
79	March 30	@ Anaheim	–			Honda Center		0–0–0

April: 0–0–0 (home: 0–0–0; road: 0–0–0) = 0 points
#	Date	Opponent	Score	OT	Decision	Location	Attendance	Record	Pts	Recap
80	April 2	Los Angeles	–			Ball Arena		0–0–0
81	April 4	@ Minnesota	–			Grand Casino Arena		0–0–0
82	April 6	@ Vancouver	–			Rogers Arena		0–0–0
83	April 8	@ Calgary	–			Scotiabank Saddledome		0–0–0
84	April 10	Minnesota	–			Ball Arena		0–0–0

Legend: Win (2 points) Loss (0 points) OT/SO loss (1 point)

== Roster ==
Updated November 15, 2026

No.	Nat	Player	Pos	S/G	Age	Acquired	Birthplace
39	(Canada)	Mackenzie Blackwood	G	L	29	2024	Thunder Bay, Ontario
54	(United States)	Gavin Brindley	RW	R	22	2025	Estero, Florida
84	(Canada)	Brent Burns	D	R	41	2025	Barrie, Ontario
28	(United States)	Alex Gagne	D	L	24	2025	Bedford, New Hampshire
13	(Canada)	T. J. Hughes	C	R	25	2026	Hamilton, Ontario
47	(Canada)	Noah Juulsen	D	R	29	2026	Surrey, British Columbia
91	(Canada)	Nazem Kadri	C	L	36	2026	London, Ontario
17	(Canada)	Parker Kelly	C	L	27	2024	Camrose, Alberta
27	(Canada)	Brett Kulak	D	L	32	2026	Stony Plain, Alberta
68	(Canada)	Zachary L'Heureux	LW	L	23	2026	Montreal, Quebec
92	(Sweden)	Gabriel Landeskog (C)	LW	L	33	2011	Stockholm, Sweden
62	(Finland)	Artturi Lehkonen	LW	L	31	2022	Piikkiö, Finland
29	(Canada)	Nathan MacKinnon (A)	C	R	31	2013	Halifax, Nova Scotia
8	(Canada)	Cale Makar (A)	D	R	28	2017	Calgary, Alberta
70	(United States)	Sam Malinski	D	R	28	2023	Lakeville, Minnesota
42	(United States)	Josh Manson	D	R	35	2022	Hinsdale, Illinois
88	(Czech Republic)	Martin Nečas	C	R	27	2025	Nové Město na Moravě, Czech Republic
11	(United States)	Brock Nelson	C	L	35	2025	Warroad, Minnesota
25	(United States)	Logan O'Connor	RW	R	30	2018	Missouri City, Texas
5	(United States)	Mike Reilly	D	L	33	2026	Chicago, Illinois
10	(Canada)	Nicolas Roy	C	R	29	2026	Amos, Quebec
71	(Canada)	Jaden Schwartz	LW	L	34	2026	Melfort, Saskatchewan
9	(Russia)	Fedor Svechkov	C	L	23	2026	Tolyatti, Russia
7	(Canada)	Devon Toews	D	L	32	2020	Abbotsford, British Columbia
41	(Canada)	Scott Wedgewood	G	L	34	2024	Brampton, Ontario

== Player statistics ==
As of November 3, 2026

=== Skaters ===
Regular season
Player	GP	G	A	Pts	+/–	PIM
Nathan MacKinnon	16	9	18	27	+5	12
Martin Nečas	16	7	11	18	+9	6
Cale Makar	15	4	14	18	+3	2
Artturi Lehkonen	16	12	5	17	+12	4
Devon Toews	16	5	10	15	+12	6
Nazem Kadri	16	5	9	14	+1	4
Jaden Schwartz	16	6	5	11	−2	4
Gabriel Landeskog	16	5	5	10	−1	2
Brock Nelson	16	4	5	9	+4	8
Fedor Svechkov	16	2	5	7	+6	23
Sam Malinski	15	0	7	7	+9	4
T. J. Hughes	16	2	4	6	0	2
Parker Kelly	16	2	4	6	+1	9
Brent Burns	16	0	6	6	−1	10
Nicolas Roy	10	2	3	5	+1	4
Josh Manson	13	1	3	4	+5	2
Brett Kulak	16	0	4	4	+3	2
Noah Juulsen	11	0	1	1	+1	4
Zachary L'Heureux	3	0	1	1	−1	7
Gavin Brindley	5	0	1	1	+1	2
Logan O'Connor	5	0	0	0	0	8
Taylor Makar	2	0	0	0	0	2

=== Goaltenders ===
Regular season
Player	GP	GS	TOI	W	L	OT	GA	GAA	SA	SV%	SO	G	A	PIM
Mackenzie Blackwood	12	11	685:53	8	3	0	32	2.80	301	.894	0	0	0	0
Scott Wedgewood	5	5	268:38	1	3	1	18	4.02	135	.867	0	0	0	0

^{†}Denotes player spent time with another team before joining the Avalanche. Stats reflect time with the Avalanche only.
^{‡}Denotes player was traded mid-season. Stats reflect time with the Avalanche only.
Bold/italics denotes franchise record.

== Transactions ==
The Avalanche have been involved in the following transactions during the 2026–27 season.

Key:

- † Contract is entry-level.
- ‡ Contract initially takes effect in the 2027-28 season.

=== Trades ===
Date	Details	Ref

=== Players acquired ===
Date	Player	Former team	Term	Via	Ref

=== Players lost ===
Date	Player	New team	Term	Via	Ref

=== Signings ===
Date	Player	Term	Ref

== Draft picks ==
Below are the Colorado Avalanche selections at the 2026 NHL entry draft, which was held on June 26 and 27, 2026, at the KeyBank Center in Buffalo, New York.

Round	#	Player	Pos	Nationality	College/Junior/Club team	League
2	43	Yegor Shilov	C	Russia	Victoriaville Tigres	QMJHL
3	74	Beckett Hamilton	C	United States	Red Deer Rebels	WHL
4	126	Tobias Tvrznik	G	Czechia	Wenatchee Wild	WHL
4	128	Axel Elofsson	D	Sweden	Örebro HK	SHL
5	140	Cole Tuminaro	D	United States	Chicago Steel	USHL
5	152	Theodore Lechner	D	United States	Holy Angels Stars	HS-MN
7	195	Shawn Carrier	LW	Canada	Halifax Mooseheads	QMJHL
7	214	Ondřej Ruml	D	Czechia	Ottawa 67's	OHL
7	215	Alexandre Raymond	G	Canada	Rouyn-Noranda Huskies	QMJHL
