= 2025–26 Tampa Bay Lightning season =

National Hockey League season

2025–26 Tampa Bay Lightning
- Division: 2nd Atlantic
- Conference: 3rd Eastern
- 2025–26 record: 50–26–6
- Home record: 26–14–1
- Road record: 24–12–5
- Goals for: 290
- Goals against: 231

Team information
- General manager: Julien BriseBois
- Coach: Jon Cooper
- Captain: Victor Hedman
- Alternate captains: Nikita Kucherov; Ryan McDonagh
- Arena: Benchmark International Arena
- Minor league affiliates: Syracuse Crunch (AHL); Orlando Solar Bears (ECHL)

Team leaders
- Goals: Nikita Kucherov (44)
- Assists: Nikita Kucherov (86)
- Points: Nikita Kucherov (130)
- Penalty minutes: Emil Lilleberg (105)
- Plus/minus: Nikita Kucherov (+43)
- Wins: Andrei Vasilevskiy (34)
- Goals against average: Andrei Vasilevskiy (2.33)

The 2025–26 Tampa Bay Lightning season was the 34th season for the National Hockey League (NHL) franchise that was established on December 16, 1991.

On April 4, 2026, the Lightning clinched a playoff berth for the ninth consecutive season following a loss by the Detroit Red Wings to the New York Rangers. With the Toronto Maple Leafs missing the playoffs for the first time since 2015–16, the Lightning alongside the Colorado Avalanche now hold the longest active playoff streak in the NHL.

The Lightning were eliminated in the first round of the playoffs in seven games, by the Montreal Canadiens.

== Off-season ==
=== May ===
On May 5, 2025, the Lightning signed defenseman Charle-Edouard D'Astous to a one-year contract for the upcoming season. D'Astous played this past season in the Swedish Hockey League (SHL) with Brynäs IF. D'Astous played in 49 games, recording 12 goals and 39 points. D'Astous also was tied for second in goals and points for defensemen in the SHL.

On May 7, 2025, the Lightning re-signed Jonas Johansson to a two-year contract extension worth $2.5 million. Johansson appeared in 19 games last season as backup goaltender to Andrei Vasilevskiy. Johansson also backed-up Vasilevskiy the prior two seasons before signing the extension with the team.

On May 22, 2025, the Chicago Blackhawks hired Lightning assistant coach Jeff Blashill as their 42nd head coach. Blashill spent the past three seasons with the Lightning.

On the same day the Lightning signed free agent forward Wojciech Stachowiak to a one-year contract. Stachowiak played in 52 games this past season with ERC Ingolstadt of the Deutsche Eishockey Liga (DEL). Stachowiak recorded 10 goals and 30 points in those 52 appearances

On May 23, 2025, the New York Islanders hired Lightning assistant general manager Mathieu Darche as their general manager. Darche has worked in the Lightning's front office since 2019 and was part of the management group that won back-to-back Stanley Cups.

On May 28, 2025, it was reported that Stacy Roest had left the organization. Roest had spent the prior 12-years with the Lightning. Roest primarily oversaw the Lightning's player development department. Roest also served as an assistant general manager with the team after being promoted.

=== June ===
On June 2, 2025, the Lightning re-signed forward Yanni Gourde to a six-year contract extension that carries a cap hit of 2.33 million. Gourde was brought back to the Lightning prior to the trade deadline this past season from the Seattle Kraken. Gourde notably was part of the Lightning's back-to-back Stanley Cup championships. Gourde also has appeared in 602 games with the Lightning, recording 133 goals and 214 assists (347 points).

On June 3, 2025, the Lightning re-signed defenseman Steve Santini to a two-year contract extension. Santini appeared in 58 games with the Syracuse Crunch this past season, recording 6 goals and 17 points. Santini also appeared in one game this past season with the Lightning.

On June 4, 2025, Nikita Kucherov won his second Ted Lindsay Award. The award is given every season to the most outstanding player in the NHL as voted on by the National Hockey League Players' Association. Kucherov captured his second straight Art Ross Trophy after leading the NHL in scoring with 37 goals and 84 assists (121 points). He also led the league in power play points (8 goals, 38 assists, 46 points).

On June 6, 2025, the Lightning re-signed defenseman Max Crozier to a 3-year contract extension. Crozier appeared in 52 games with Syracuse this past season, recording 34 points. Crozier also has appeared in 18 games with the Lightning.

That same day the Lightning announced that it had signed Dan Hinote as its new assistant coach. Hinote previously was an assistant coach in the NHL with the Nashville Predators (2020–24). Hinote spent the past season as an associate coach with the Colorado Eagles of the American Hockey League. In addition to his coaching experience, Hinote previously played in 503 regular season games in the NHL and also won the Stanley Cup with the Colorado Avalanche. Hinote also is a native of Leesburg, Florida.

On June 8, 2025, the Lightning announced it had re-signed forward Jack Finley to a 3-year contract extension. Finley appeared in 40 games with the Syracuse Crunch, recording 14 goals and 28 points. Finley also made his NHL debut this past season with the Lightning in January.

On June 28, 2025, the Lightning made eight selections on the second day of the 2025 NHL entry draft. The Lightning selected Ethan Czata (#56), Benjamin Rautiainen (#121), Aiden Foster (#127), Everett Baldwin (#151), Caleb Heil (#193), Roman Luttsev (#206), Grant Spada (#212) and Marco Migmosa (#215).

On June 29, 2025, the Lightning place Conor Sheary on unconditional waivers to mutually terminate his contract. Sheary appeared in 5 games this past season with the Lightning and spent the majority of the season with the Syracuse Crunch. Sheary has one year remaining on his 3-year contract with the team at the time of being placed on waivers.

=== July ===
The Lightning were involved in following player signings on the first day of free agency (July 1).

The Lightning signed forward Nick Abruzzese to a one-year contract. Abruzzese appeared in 71 games with the Toronto Marlies this past season, recording 15 goals, 28 assists and 43 points. He has totaled 143 points over 211 games with the Marlies. He has also appeared in regular season games with the Toronto Maple Leafs.

The lightning signed defenseman Simon Lundmark to a two-year contract. Lundmark spent the past four seasons playing for the Winnipeg Jets' American Hockey League affiliate the Manitoba Moose. He was not issued a qualifying offer by the Jets, so he became a free agent on July 1. With the Moose, he recorded 14 points this past season over 66 games. He also has 62 points over 254 games with the Moose.

The Lightning signed Boris Katchouk to a one-year contract. Katchouk spent the past season playing for the Pittsburgh Penguins' affiliate the Wilkes-Barre/Scranton Penguins. Katchouk appeared in 67 games and recorded 21 goals and 49 points. Katchouk also has skated in 176 NHL games between the Lightning, Chicago Blackhawks and Ottawa Senators.

The Lightning signed forward Pontus Holmberg to a two-year contract that carries a $1.55 million cap hit. Holmberg appeared in 68 games with the Toronto Maple Leafs the prior season, recording 7 goals and 19 points. Holmberg also has appeared in 159 games with the Leafs, recording 19 goals and 49 points. Holmberg reached free agency to sign with the Lightning after he was not issued a qualifying offer by the Leafs prior to the July 1 deadline.

The Lightning signed forward Tristan Allard to a two-year entry level contract. Allard appeared in 45 games with the Syracuse Crunch of the AHL this past season, recording 7 goals and 9 assists.

The Lightning signed goaltender Ryan Fanti to a one-year contract. Fanti appeared in 7 games this past season with the Syracuse Crunch, recording 3–1–0 record, 1.45 GAA and .946 save percentage. Fanti also appeared in 37 games with the ECHL Orlando Solar Bears, recording a 18–13–5, 2.71 GAA and .907 save percentage.

Finally, the Lightning re-signed Gage Goncalves to a two-year contract extension. Gonclaves appeared in 60 games this past season with the Lightning, recording 8 goals, 12 assists and 20 points. He also appeared in all 5 of the Lightning's playoff games where he was tied for second in playoff scoring with the team.

On July 2, 2025, the Lightning signed forward Jakob Pelletier to a three-year contract. Pelletier split last season between the Calgary Flames and Philadelphia Flyers. Pelletier appeared in 49 games, recording seven goals and 19 points. Pelletier was originally drafted 26th overall by the Flames in the 2019 NHL draft.

On July 7, 2025, the Lightning hired Jeff Tambellini as the assistant general manager. He will also serve as the general manager of the Lighthing's AHL affiliate, the Syracuse Crunch. This is also Tambellini's third stint with the organization. He originally played for the Lightning in the 2015–16. He then worked for the team as an NCAA pro scout from 2020 to 2022.

On July 8, 2025, the Lightning traded forward Isaac Howard to the Edmonton Oilers in exchange for forward Sam O'Reilly. Howard was a former first-round pick of the Lightning in the 2022 NHL draft. Howard finished up his college career at Michigan State University and capturing the Hobey Baker Award prior to the trade. O'Reilly comes to the Lightning after helping the London Knights of the Ontario Hockey League win the OHL championship and the Memorial Cup. O'Reilly appeared in 62 games with the Knights, recording 28 goals and 71 points. He recorded 22 points in the post season for the Knights in winning the OHL championship. He also recorded 2 goals and 5 points in five games in the Knights Memorial Cup win. O'Reilly was also a former first-round pick of the Oilers in the 2024 NHL entry draft.

On July 13, 2025, the Lightning signed forward Scott Sabourin to a one-year contract. Sabourin appeared in 68 games with the San Jose Barracuda of the AHL. Sabourin recorded 10 goals and 25 points over those 68 games. He also appeared in one game with the San Jose Sharks. In his career he also has skated in 47 NHL games with the Sharks, Ottawa Senators and Toronto Maple Leafs.

On July 23, 2025, the Lightning signed forward Ethan Czata to a three-year entry level contract. Czata was originally drafted by the Lightning in the 2nd-round of the 2025 NHL entry draft.

== Training camp ==
=== September ===
On September 17, 2025, the Lightning announced that forward Nick Paul underwent surgery to repair an upper-body injury. The injury was something he sustained during the prior season. Paul is expected to be out of the lineup until at least until November.

On September 20, 2025, the Lightning signed forward Dominic James to a two-year entry level contract. James became a free agent after not signing with the Chicago Black Hawks after being drafted by them in 2022 NHL entry draft. James appeared in 111 games with Minnesota Duluth University, recording 30 goals and 77 points. James also finished his career with Minnesota as the team's captain.

On September 24, 2025, the Lightning made their first cut to the training roster to reduce it down to 53 players. The Lightning released the following players back to their junior teams: Everett Baldwin, Ethan Czata, Aiden Foster, Jan Golicic, Caleb Heil, Marco Mignosa, Sam O'Reilly, Kaden Pitre and Grant Spada.

On September 28, 2025, the Lightning made their second round of roster cuts to reduce their training came roster down to 32 players. The following players were assigned to the Syracuse Crunch: Tristan Allard, Cooper Flinton, Brendan Furry, Ethan Gauthier, Niko Huuhtanen, Spencer Kersten, Connor Kurth, Lucas Mercuri, Reece Newkirk, Milo Roelens, Gabriel Szturc, Charle-Edouard D'Astous, Dyllan Gill, Maxim Groshev, Chris Harpur, Tommy Miller, Matteo Pietroniro and Harrison Meneghin. Also, the following players were placed on waivers: Ryan Fanti, Simon Lundmark, Scott Sabourin and Steven Santini. These players will also be assigned to Syracuse for the start of its training camp if they clear waivers.

=== October ===
On October 1, 2025, the Lightning made another set of training camp cuts. The lightning assigned Dylan Duke, Scott Sabourin and Wojciech Stachowiak to the Syracuse Crunch. The Lightning also placed Nick Abruzzese, Boris Katchouk and Jakob Pelletier on waivers to be assigned to the Syracuse Crunch.

On October 2, 2025, the Lightning claimed goaltender Pheonix Copley off waivers from the Los Angeles Kings. Copley has appeared in 77 NHL games in his career, recording 44-wins, a .898 save percentage and a 2.84 GAA.

On October 6, 2025, the Lightning claimed Curtis Douglas off waivers from the Utah Mammoth. Douglas has played in 261 games in the American Hockey League, recording 37 goals, 60 assists, 97 points and 508 penalty minutes.

That same day the Lightning announced their opening night roster for the 2025–26 season.

Forwards

Oliver Bjorkstrand, Mitchell Chaffee, Anthony Cirelli, Curtis Douglas, Jack Finley, Conor Geekie, Zemgus Girgensons, Gage Goncalves, Yanni Gourde, Jake Guentzel, Brandon Hagel, Pontus Holmberg, Nikita Kucherov, Nick Paul and Brayden Point.

Defense

Erik Cernak, Max Crozier, Victor Hedman, Emil Lilleberg, Ryan McDonagh, J.J. Moser and Darren Raddysh.

Goaltenders

Andrei Vasilevskiy, Jonas Johansson and Pheonix Copley

The team also announced that Zemgus Girgensons, Niko Huuhtanen and Nick Paul would start thee season on the team's injured reserve list due to injury.

== Standings ==
=== Divisional standings ===
Atlantic Division
Pos	Team	GP	W	L	OTL	RW	GF	GA	GD	Pts
1	y – Buffalo Sabres	82	50	23	9	42	288	241	+47	109
2	x – Tampa Bay Lightning	82	50	26	6	40	290	231	+59	106
3	x – Montreal Canadiens	82	48	24	10	34	283	256	+27	106
4	x – Boston Bruins	82	45	27	10	33	272	250	+22	100
5	x – Ottawa Senators	82	44	27	11	38	278	246	+32	99
6	Detroit Red Wings	82	41	31	10	30	241	258	−17	92
7	Florida Panthers	82	40	38	4	32	251	276	−25	84
8	Toronto Maple Leafs	82	32	36	14	23	253	299	−46	78

Source: National Hockey League
Rules for classification: 1) Fewer number of games played (GP, only during regular season); 2) Greater number of regulation wins (RW); 3) Greater number of wins in regulation and overtime, excluding shootout wins (ROW); 4) Greater number of total wins, including shootouts (W); 5) Greater number of points earned in head-to-head play; if teams played an uneven number of head-to-head games, the result of the first game on the home ice of the team with the extra home game is discarded; 6) Greater goal differential (GD); 7) Greater number of goals scored (GF)
x – Clinched playoff spot; y – Clinched division

=== Conference standings ===
Eastern Conference Wild Card
Pos	Div	Team	GP	W	L	OTL	RW	GF	GA	GD	Pts
1	AT	x – Boston Bruins	82	45	27	10	33	272	250	+22	100
2	AT	x – Ottawa Senators	82	44	27	11	38	278	246	+32	99
3	ME	Washington Capitals	82	43	30	9	37	263	244	+19	95
4	AT	Detroit Red Wings	82	41	31	10	30	241	258	−17	92
5	ME	Columbus Blue Jackets	82	40	30	12	28	253	253	0	92
6	ME	New York Islanders	82	43	34	5	29	233	241	−8	91
7	ME	New Jersey Devils	82	42	37	3	29	230	254	−24	87
8	AT	Florida Panthers	82	40	38	4	32	251	276	−25	84
9	AT	Toronto Maple Leafs	82	32	36	14	23	253	299	−46	78
10	ME	New York Rangers	82	34	39	9	25	238	250	−12	77

Source: National Hockey League
Rules for classification: 1) Fewer number of games played (GP, only during regular season); 2) Greater number of regulation wins (RW); 3) Greater number of wins in regulation and overtime, excluding shootout wins (ROW); 4) Greater number of total wins, including shootouts (W); 5) Greater number of points earned in head-to-head play; if teams played an uneven number of head-to-head games, the result of the first game on the home ice of the team with the extra home game is discarded; 6) Greater goal differential (GD); 7) Greater number of goals scored (GF)
x – Clinched playoff spot

== Schedule and results ==
=== Preseason ===
2025 preseason game log: 6–1–0 (Home: 4–0–0; Road: 2–1–0)

Game	Date	Opponent	Score	OT	Location	Attendance	Record
1	September 22	@ Carolina	2–1		Lenovo Center	13,925	1–0–0
2	September 23	@ Nashville	3–2	SO	Bridgestone Arena	17,159	2–0–0
3	September 26	Carolina	6–5		Benchmark International Arena	13,449	3–0–0
4	September 27	Nashville	4–1		Benchmark International Arena	14,228	4–0–0
5	September 30	Florida	3–2		Kia Center	15,334	5–0–0
6	October 2	Florida	5–2		Benchmark International Arena	13,200	6–0–0
7	October 4	@ Florida	0–7		Amerant Bank Arena	17,862	6–1–0

Lightning score listed first;

Win Loss Overtime/shootout loss

=== Regular season ===
2025–26 game log
October: 5–4–2, 12 points (Home: 3–3–0; Road: 2–1–2)

Game	Date	Opponent	Score	OT	Decision	Location	Attendance	Record	Points	Recap
1	October 9	Ottawa Senators	4–5		Vasilevskiy	Benchmark International Arena	19,092	0–1–0	0	
2	October 11	New Jersey Devils	3–5		Vasilevskiy	Benchmark International Arena	19,092	0–2–0	0	
3	October 13	@ Boston Bruins	4–3		Johansson	TD Garden	17,850	1–2–0	2	
4	October 14	@ Washington Capitals	2–3	OT	Vasilevskiy	Capital One Arena	16,948	1–2–1	3	
5	October 17	@ Detroit Red Wings	1–2	OT	Vasilevskiy	Little Caesars Arena	19,515	1–2–2	4	
6	October 18	@ Columbus Blue Jackets	2–3		Johansson	Nationwide Arena	15,822	1–3–2	4	
7	October 23	Chicago Blackhawks	2–3		Vasilevskiy	Benchmark International Arena	19,092	1–4–2	4	
8	October 25	Anaheim Ducks	4–3		Johansson	Benchmark International Arena	19,092	2–4–2	6	
9	October 26	Vegas Golden Knights	2–1	OT	Vasilevskiy	Benchmark International Arena	19,092	3–4–2	8	
10	October 28	@ Nashville Predators	5–2		Vasilevskiy	Bridgestone Arena	17,159	4–4–2	10	
11	October 30	Dallas Stars	2–1	OT	Vasilevskiy	Benchmark International Arena	19,092	5–4–2	12	

November: 11–3–0, 22 points (Home: 5–2–0; Road: 6–1–0)

Game	Date	Opponent	Score	OT	Decision	Location	Attendance	Record	Points	Recap
12	November 2	@ Utah Mammoth	4–2		Johansson	Delta Center	12,478	6–4–2	14	
13	November 4	@ Colorado Avalanche	2–3		Vasilevskiy	Ball Arena	18,071	6–5–2	14	
14	November 6	@ Vegas Golden Knights	6–3		Vasilevskiy	T-Mobile Arena	17,717	7–5–2	16	
15	November 8	Washington Capitals	3–2		Vasilevskiy	Benchmark International Arena	19,092	8–5–2	18	
16	November 12	New York Rangers	3–7		Vasilevskiy	Benchmark International Arena	19,092	8–6–2	18	
17	November 15	@ Florida Panthers	3–1		Vasilevskiy	Amerant Bank Arena	19,894	9–6–2	20	
18	November 16	Vancouver Canucks	2–6		Johansson	Benchmark International Arena	19,092	9–7–2	20	
19	November 18	New Jersey Devils	5–1		Vasilevskiy	Benchmark International Arena	19,092	10–7–2	22	
20	November 20	Edmonton Oilers	2–1	OT	Vasilevskiy	Benchmark International Arena	19,092	11–7–2	24	
21	November 22	@ Washington Capitals	5–3		Johansson	Capital One Arena	18,347	12–7–2	26	
22	November 24	Philadelphia Flyers	3–0		Vasilevskiy	Benchmark International Arena	19,092	13–7–2	28	
23	November 26	Calgary Flames	5–1		Vasilevskiy	Benchmark International Arena	19,092	14–7–2	30	
24	November 28	@ Detroit Red Wings	6–3		Vasilevskiy	Little Caesars Arena	19,515	15–7–2	32	
25	November 29	@ New York Rangers	4–1		Johansson	Madison Square Garden	18,006	16–7–2	34	

December: 7–6–1, 15 points (Home: 3–4–0; Road: 4–2–1)

Game	Date	Opponent	Score	OT	Decision	Location	Attendance	Record	Points	Recap
26	December 2	@ New York Islanders	1–2		Vasilevskiy	UBS Arena	13,014	16–8–2	34	
27	December 4	Pittsburgh Penguins	3–4		Johansson	Benchmark International Arena	19,032	16–9–2	34	
28	December 6	New York Islanders	0–2		Johansson	Benchmark International Arena	19,092	16–10–2	34	
29	December 8	@ Toronto Maple Leafs	0–2		Johansson	Scotiabank Arena	18,520	16–11–2	34	
30	December 9	@ Montreal Canadiens	6–1		Johansson	Bell Centre	20,962	17–11–2	36	
31	December 11	@ New Jersey Devils	8–4		Johansson	Prudential Center	16,042	18–11–2	38	
32	December 13	@ New York Islanders	2–3	SO	Johansson	UBS Arena	17,255	18–11–3	39	
33	December 15	Florida Panthers	2–5		Johansson	Benchmark International Arena	19,092	18–12–3	39	
34	December 18	Los Angeles Kings	1–2		Vasilevskiy	Benchmark International Arena	19,092	18–13–3	39	
35	December 20	Carolina Hurricanes	6–4		Vasilevskiy	Benchmark International Arena	19,092	19–13–3	41	
36	December 22	St. Louis Blues	4–1		Vasilevskiy	Benchmark International Arena	19,092	20–13–3	43	
37	December 27	@ Florida Panthers	4–2		Vasilevskiy	Amerant Bank Arena	19,651	21–13–3	45	
38	December 28	Montreal Canadiens	5–4	SO	Johansson	Benchmark International Arena	19,092	22–13–3	47	
39	December 31	@ Anaheim Ducks	4–3	OT	Vasilevskiy	Honda Center	16,214	23–13–3	49	

January: 11–1–1, 23 points (Home: 4–0–0; Road: 7–1–1)

Game	Date	Opponent	Score	OT	Decision	Location	Attendance	Record	Points	Recap
40	January 1	@ Los Angeles Kings	5–3		Johansson	Crypto.com Arena	18,001	24–13–3	51	
41	January 3	@ San Jose Sharks	7–3		Johansson	SAP Center	17,435	25–13–3	53	
42	January 6	Colorado Avalanche	4–2		Vasilevskiy	Benchmark International Arena	19,092	26–13–3	55	
43	January 10	@ Philadelphia Flyers	7–2		Vasilevskiy	Xfinity Mobile Arena	19,618	27–13–3	57	
44	January 12	@ Philadelphia Flyers	5–1		Johansson	Xfinity Mobile Arena	19,489	28–13–3	59	
45	January 13	@ Pittsburgh Penguins	2–1	SO	Vasilevskiy	PPG Paints Arena	14,546	29–13–3	61	
46	January 16	@ St. Louis Blues	2–3	SO	Vasilevskiy	Enterprise Center	18,096	29–13–4	62	
47	January 18	@ Dallas Stars	4–1		Vasilevskiy	American Airlines Center	18,532	30–13–4	64	
48	January 20	San Jose Sharks	4–1		Vasilevskiy	Benchmark International Arena	19,092	31–13–4	66	
49	January 23	@ Chicago Blackhawks	2–1	SO	Vasilevskiy	United Center	18,841	32–13–4	68	
50	January 24	@ Columbus Blue Jackets	5–8		Johansson	Nationwide Arena	16,852	32–14–4	68	
51	January 26	Utah Mammoth	2–0		Vasilevskiy	Benchmark International Arena	19,096	33–14–4	70	
52	January 29	Winnipeg Jets	4–1		Vasilevskiy	Benchmark International Arena	19,092	34–14–4	72	

February: 4–2–0, 8 points (Home: 4–1–0; Road: 0–1–0)

Game	Date	Opponent	Score	OT	Decision	Location	Attendance	Record	Points	Recap
53	February 1	Boston Bruins	6–5	SO	Vasilevskiy	Raymond James Stadium	64,617 (outdoors)	35–14–4	74	
54	February 3	Buffalo Sabres	4–3	OT	Vasilevskiy	Benchmark International Arena	19,092	36–14–4	76	
55	February 5	Florida Panthers	6–1		Vasilevskiy	Benchmark International Arena	19,092	37–14–4	78	
56	February 25	Toronto Maple Leafs	4–2		Vasilevskiy	Benchmark International Arena	19,092	38–14–4	80	
57	February 26	@ Carolina Hurricanes	4–5		Johansson	Lenovo Center	18,565	38–15–4	80	
58	February 28	Buffalo Sabres	2–6		Vasilevskiy	Benchmark International Arena	19,092	38–16–4	80	

March: 8–6–2, 18 points (Home: 4–3–1; Road: 4–3–1)

Game	Date	Opponent	Score	OT	Decision	Location	Attendance	Record	Points	Recap
59	March 3	@ Minnesota Wild	1–5		Vasilevskiy	Grand Casino Arena	18,101	38–17–4	80	
60	March 5	@ Winnipeg Jets	1–4		Vasilevskiy	Canada Life Centre	13,473	38–18–4	80	
61	March 7	@ Toronto Maple Leafs	5–2		Vasilevskiy	Scotiabank Arena	18,514	39–18–4	82	
62	March 8	@ Buffalo Sabres	7–8		Johansson	KeyBank Center	19,070	39–19–4	82	
63	March 10	Columbus Blue Jackets	2–5		Vasilevskiy	Benchmark International Arena	19,092	39–20–4	82	
64	March 12	Detroit Red Wings	4–1		Vasilevskiy	Benchmark International Arena	19,092	40–20–4	84	
65	March 14	Carolina Hurricanes	2–4		Vasilevskiy	Benchmark International Arena	19,092	40–21–4	84	
66	March 17	@ Seattle Kraken	6–2		Vasilevskiy	Climate Pledge Arena	17,151	41–21–4	86	
67	March 19	@ Vancouver Canucks	6–2		Vasilevskiy	Rogers Arena	18,345	42–21–4	88	
68	March 21	@ Edmonton Oilers	5–2		Vasilevskiy	Rogers Place	18,347	43–21–4	90	
69	March 22	@ Calgary Flames	3–4	OT	Johansson	Scotiabank Saddledome	17,287	43–21–5	91	
70	March 24	Minnesota Wild	6–3		Vasilevskiy	Benchmark International Arena	19,092	44–21–5	93	
71	March 26	Seattle Kraken	3–4	OT	Vasilevskiy	Benchmark International Arena	19,092	44–21–6	94	
72	March 28	Ottawa Senators	4–2		Vasilevskiy	Benchmark International Arena	19,095	45–21–6	96	
73	March 29	Nashville Predators	3–2		Johansson	Benchmark International Arena	19,092	46–21–6	98	
74	March 31	Montreal Canadiens	1–4		Vasilevskiy	Benchmark International Arena	19,092	46–22–6	98	

April: 4–4–0, 8 points (Home: 3–1–0; Road: 1–3–0)

Game	Date	Opponent	Score	OT	Decision	Location	Attendance	Record	Points	Recap
75	April 2	Pittsburgh Penguins	6–3		Vasilevskiy	Benchmark International Arena	19,092	47–22–6	100	
76	April 4	Boston Bruins	3–1		Vasilevskiy	Benchmark International Arena	19,092	48–22–6	102	
77	April 6	@ Buffalo Sabres	2–4		Vasilevskiy	KeyBank Center	19,070	48–23–6	102	
78	April 7	@ Ottawa Senators	2–6		Johansson	Canadian Tire Centre	16,603	48–24–6	102	
79	April 9	@ Montreal Canadiens	1–2		Vasilevskiy	Bell Centre	20,962	48–25–6	102	
80	April 11	@ Boston Bruins	2–1		Vasilevskiy	TD Garden	17,850	49–25–6	104	
81	April 13	Detroit Red Wings	4–3	OT	Vasilevskiy	Benchmark International Arena	19,092	50–25–6	106	
82	April 15	New York Rangers	2–4		Halverson	Benchmark International Arena	19,092	50–26–6	106	

Lightning score listed first;

Win Loss Overtime/shootout loss

=== Playoffs ===
2026 Stanley Cup playoffs
Eastern Conference first round vs. (A3) Montreal Canadiens – Montreal won 4–3

Game	Date	Opponent	Score	OT	Decision	Location	Attendance	Series	Recap
1	April 19	Montreal Canadiens	3–4	OT	Vasilevskiy	Benchmark International Arena	19,092	0–1	
2	April 21	Montreal Canadiens	3–2	OT	Vasilevskiy	Benchmark International Arena	19,092	1–1	
3	April 23	@ Montreal Canadiens	2–3	OT	Vasilevskiy	Bell Centre	20,962	1–2	
4	April 26	@ Montreal Canadiens	3–2		Vasilevskiy	Bell Centre	20,962	2–2	
5	April 29	Montreal Canadiens	2–3		Vasilevskiy	Benchmark International Arena	19,092	2–3	
6	May 1	@ Montreal Canadiens	1–0	OT	Vasilevskiy	Bell Centre	20,962	3–3	
7	May 3	Montreal Canadiens	1–2		Vasilevskiy	Benchmark International Arena	19,092	3–4	

Lightning score listed first;

Win Loss

== Player stats ==
Final

=== Skaters ===
Regular season
Player	GP	G	A	Pts	+/−	PIM
Nikita Kucherov	76	44	86	130	43	50
Jake Guentzel	81	38	50	88	13	61
Brandon Hagel	71	36	38	74	34	58
Darren Raddysh	73	22	48	70	21	72
Anthony Cirelli	71	23	29	52	38	48
Brayden Point	63	18	32	50	12	14
Gage Goncalves	74	11	22	33	26	41
Oliver Bjorkstrand	80	12	20	32	–14	16
J.J. Moser	79	7	22	29	41	69
Charle-Edouard D'Astous	70	6	23	29	–4	112
Yanni Gourde	82	9	19	28	–6	66
Pontus Holmberg	70	11	11	22	1	31
Ryan McDonagh	48	6	15	21	14	6
Zemgus Girgensons	74	9	11	20	1	31
Victor Hedman	33	1	16	17	–1	10
Dominic James	43	7	8	15	4	8
Nick Paul	51	7	8	15	–15	32
Emil Lilleberg	50	4	8	12	15	61
Erik Cernak	61	3	8	11	3	74
Max Crozier	35	1	9	10	7	40
Corey Perry^{†}	22	6	3	9	1	22
Scott Sabourin	26	1	4	5	1	89
Jack Finley^{‡}	22	2	1	3	2	21
Declan Carlile	42	1	2	3	5	40
Conor Geekie	14	1	2	3	–3	8
Curtis Douglas^{‡}	29	0	2	2	1	92
Steven Santini	12	0	1	1	1	2
Mitchell Chaffee	11	0	1	1	–2	4
Maxim Groshev	2	0	1	1	1	0
Jakob Pelletier	5	0	0	0	–1	0
Boris Katchouk^{‡}	3	0	0	0	–1	0
Simon Lundmark	1	0	0	0	1	0
Dylan Duke	1	0	0	0	–1	0

- Most goals in a single season by a Lightning defenseman

Playoffs
Player	GP	G	A	Pts	+/−	PIM
Brandon Hagel	7	6	2	8	6	13
Jake Guentzel	7	2	6	8	3	8
Nikita Kucherov	7	1	5	6	2	10
Dominic James	7	2	1	3	−4	0
Gage Goncalves	7	1	2	3	−5	0
J.J. Moser	7	1	2	3	3	2
Darren Raddysh	7	1	1	2	1	6
Anthony Cirelli	7	0	2	2	5	2
Brayden Point	7	1	0	1	−1	2
Ryan McDonagh	7	0	1	1	2	6
Yanni Gourde	7	0	1	1	0	10
Erik Cernak	7	0	1	1	2	2
Charle-Edouard D'Astous	3	0	1	1	−1	2
Corey Perry	7	0	0	0	−2	4
Zemgus Girgensons	7	0	0	0	−2	4
Emil Lilleberg	7	0	0	0	−4	4
Nick Paul	6	0	0	0	−2	4
Oliver Bjorkstrand	3	0	0	0	−2	0
Scott Sabourin	2	0	0	0	0	2
Max Crozier	2	0	0	0	−2	2
Declan Carlile	2	0	0	0	−3	0
Conor Geekie	2	0	0	0	−1	2

=== Goaltenders ===
Regular season
Player	GP	GS	TOI	W	L	OT	GA	GAA	SA	SV%	SO	G	A	PIM
Andrei Vasilevskiy	58	58	3430:45	39	15	4	132	2.31	1483	.912	2	0	2	11
Jonas Johansson	25	23	1423:31	11	10	2	78	3.29	670	.884	0	0	0	0
Brandon Halverson	2	1	56:53	0	1	0	4	4.22	21	.810	0	0	0	0

Playoffs
Player	GP	GS	TOI	W	L	GA	GAA	SA	SV%	SO	G	A	PIM
Andrei Vasilevskiy	7	7	439:45	3	4	16	2.18	156	.897	1	0	0	0

^{†}Denotes player spent time with another team before joining Tampa Bay. Stats reflect time with Tampa Bay only.
^{‡}Traded from Tampa Bay mid-season.
Bold/italics denotes franchise record

== Suspensions/fines ==
Player	Explanation	Length	Salary	Date issued
Roman Schmidt	Fined for a severe cross-check against Carter Verhaeghe during a preseason game against the Florida Panthers on October 4, 2025, at Amerant Bank Arena.	–	$2,098.52	October 5, 2025
Gage Goncalves	Fined for a severe cross-check against Evan Rodrigues during a preseason game against the Florida Panthers on October 4, 2025, at Amerant Bank Arena.	–	$3,125.00	October 5, 2025
Scott Sabourin	Suspended for four games for roughing Aaron Ekblad during a preseason game against the Florida Panthers on October 4, 2025, at Amerant Bank Arena.	4 games	–	October 6, 2025
J.J. Moser	Suspended for two games for roughing Jesper Boqvist during a preseason game against the Florida Panthers on October 4, 2025, at Amerant Bank Arena.	2 games	–	October 6, 2025
Team	Actions culminating in the events of a preseason game against the Florida Panthers on October 4, 2025, at Amerant Bank Arena.	–	$100,000	October 6, 2025
Jon Cooper (head coach)	Actions culminating in the events of a preseason game against the Florida Panthers on October 4, 2025, at Amerant Bank Arena.	–	$25,000	October 6, 2025
Scott Sabourin	Fined for slashing Niko Mikkola in a regular season game against the Florida panthers on December 28, 2025, at Amerant Bank Arena.	–	$2,018.23	December 29, 2025
Curtis Douglas	Fined for being the aggressor in an altercation with Florida Panthers defenseman Niko Mikkola in a regular season game against the Florida Panthers on February 5, 2026, at Benchmark International Arena.	–	$2,018.23	February 6, 2026
Brandon Hagel	Fined for being the aggressor in an altercation with Buffalo Sabres defensemen Rasmus Dahlin in a regular season game against the Buffalo Sabres on March 8, 2026, at KeyBank Center.	–	$5,000	March 8, 2026

== Awards and honours ==
=== Awards ===
Regular season
Player	Award	Awarded
Brandon Hagel	NHL Second Star of the Week	December 1, 2025
Nikita Kucherov	NHL First Star of the Week	December 29, 2025
Nikita Kucherov	NHL First Star of the Week	January 5, 2026
Nikita Kucherov	NHL Second Star of the Week	January 26, 2026
Nikita Kucherov	NHL Fist Start of the Month for January	February 1, 2026
Andrei Vasilevskiy	NHL Second Star of the Week	February 2, 2026
Nikita Kucherov	NHL Second Star of the Week	March 23, 2026
Nikita Kucherov	NHL First Star of the Month of March	April 1, 2026
Jon Cooper	2025–26 Jack Adams Award winner	June 3, 2026
Andrei Vasilevskiy	2025–26 Vezina Trophy winner	June 6, 2026
Nikita Kucherov	2025–26 Hart Memorial Trophy winner	June 11, 2026

=== Milestones ===
Regular season
Player	Milestone	Reached
Curtis Douglas	1st career NHL game	October 9, 2025
Mitchell Chaffee	100th career NHL game	October 11, 2025
Dominic James	1st career NHL game	October 23, 2025
Charle-Edouard D'Astous	1st career NHL game	October 25, 2025
Nikita Kucherov	1000th career NHL point	October 25, 2025
Victor Hedman	800th career NHL point	October 25, 2025
Brandon Hagel	300th career NHL point	October 25, 2025
Charle-Edouard D'Astous	1st career NHL goal 1st career NHL point	October 28, 2025
Anthony Cirelli	300th career NHL point	October 28, 2025
Charle-Edouard D'Astous	1st career NHL assist	October 30, 2025
Dominic James	1st career NHL goal 1st career NHL point 1st career NHL assist	November 6, 2025
Jack Finley	1st career NHL point 1st career NHL assist	November 12, 2025
Curtis Douglas	1st career NHL point 1st career NHL assist	November 12, 2025
Jack Finley	1st career NHL goal	November 15, 2025
Jake Guentzel	8th career NHL hattrick	November 18, 2025
Nick Paul	200th career NHL point	November 20, 2025
Zemgus Girgensons	200th career NHL point	November 26, 2025
Brandon Hagel	400th career NHL game	December 5, 2025
Darren Raddysh	200th career NHL game	December 9, 2025
Jake Guentzel	600th career NHL point	December 9, 2025
Nick Paul	100th career NHL goal	December 11, 2025
Nick Paul	500th career NHL game	December 15, 2025
Max Crozier	1st career NHL goal	December 15, 2025
Darren Raddysh	100th career NHL point	December 22, 2025
Oliver Bjorkstrand	400th career NHL point	December 22, 2025
Zemgus Girgensons	800th career NHL game	December 27, 2025
Maxim Groshev	1st career NHL game 1st career NHL point 1st career NHL assist	December 28, 2025
Jon Cooper	1000th career NHL game	December 31, 2025
J. J. Moser	100th career NHL point	January 1, 2026
Darren Raddysh	1st career NHL hattrick	January 3, 2026
Gage Goncalves	100th career NHL game	January 6, 2026
J. J. Moser	300th career NHL game	January 10, 2026
Jon Cooper	600th career NHL win	January 12, 2026
Andrei Vasilevskiy	350th career NHL win	January 13, 2026
Simon Lundmark	1st career NHL game	January 24, 2026
Nikita Kucherov	700th career NHL assist	February 25, 2026
Jonas Johansson	100th career NHL game	February 26, 2026
Brayden Point	700th career NHL game	March 7, 2026
Brandon Hagel	200th career NHL assist	March 8, 2026
Darren Raddysh	100th career NHL assist	March 8, 2026
Nikita Kucherov	1100th career NHL point	March 12, 2026
Nikita Kucherov	7th career NHL hattrick	March 17, 2026
Nikita Kucherov	1st career NHL SHG goal	March 21, 2026
Jake Guentzel	300th career NHL goal	March 24, 2026
Anthony Cirelli	2nd career hattrick	April 2, 2026
Zemgus Girgensons	100th career NHL goal	April 2, 2026
Nikita Kucherov	400th career NHL goal	April 7, 2026
Erik Cernak	500th career NHL	April 11, 2026

Playoffs
Player	Milestone	Reached
Charle-Edouard D'Astous	1st career playoff game	April 19, 2026
Dominic James	1st career playoff game	April 19, 2026
Declan Carlile	1st career playoff game	April 21, 2026
Scott Sabourin	1st career playoff game	April 21, 2026
J. J. Moser	1st career playoff goal 1st career playoff point	April 21, 2026
Ryan McDonagh	200th career playoff game	April 26, 2026
J. J. Moser	1st career playoff assist	April 26, 2026
Dominic James	1st career playoff goal 1st career playoff point	April 29, 2026
Dominic James	1st career playoff assist	May 1, 2026
Charle-Edouard D'Astous	1st career playoff point 1st career playoff assist	May 3, 2026

=== Records ===
Regular season
Player	Record	Reached
Victor Hedman	Most seasons played in Tampa Bay Lightning history. Hedman passed Steven Stamkos (16 seasons).	October 9, 2025
Nikita Kucherov	Fourth most powerplay goals in Tampa Bay Lightning history. Kucherov passed Martin St. Louis (96).	October 9, 2025
Brayden Point	Seventh most games played in Tampa Bay Lightning history. Point passed Pavel Kubina (662).	October 19, 2025
Nikita Kucherov	Second player in Tampa Bay Lightning history to record 1,000 points with the franchise. Kucherov was the fourth fast player born outside of North America to score 1,000 points (809 games) and 17th fastest in NHL history. Kucherov was also the 101st player in NHL history to record 1,000 points.	October 25, 2025
Victor Hedman	First defenseman and fifth player in Tampa Bay Lightning history to record 800 points with the franchise. Hedman was also the 19th defenseman to reach 800 points in NHL history.	October 25, 2025
Nikita Kucherov	Third most goals in Tampa Bay Lightning history. Kucherov passed Martin St. Louis (365).	November 19, 2025
Anthony Cirelli	Third most shorthanded points in Tampa Bay Lightning history. Cirelli passed Vincent Lecavalier (23).	November 22, 2025
Brayden Point	Sixth most assists in Tampa Bay Lightning history. Point passed Brad Richards (339).	December 13, 2025
Darren Raddysh	Second fastest defenseman to reach 100 career points in Tampa Bay Lightning history (206 games).	December 22, 2025
Anthony Cirelli	Second most shorthanded points in Tampa Bay Lightning history. Cirelli tied Rob Zamuner (25).	December 27, 2025
Nikita Kucherov	Second player in Tampa Bay Lightning history to record 500 career points on the road. Kucherov joined Steve Stamkos as the only players to do so in team history.	December 27, 2025
Nikita Kucherov	Fourth most game winning goals in Tampa Bay Lightning history. Kucherov passed Vincent Lecavalier (60).	December 27, 2025
Jon Cooper	First coach in Tampa Bay Lightning history to coach 1,000 games with the franchise. Cooper was also the 5th coach in NHL history to coach in 1,000 games with a single franchise, and the 32nd coach to reach 1,000 games coached.	December 31, 2025
Nikita Kucherov	Third most 20 goal seasons in Tampa Bay Lightning history. Kucherov passed Martin St. Louis (10).	January 3, 2026
Darren Raddysh	Third defenseman in Tampa Bay Lightning history to record a hattrick. Raddysh joined Dan Boyle and Doug Crossman as the only defensemen in team history to record the feat.	January 3, 2026
Nikita Kucherov	Second player in Tampa Bay Lightning history to record 300 career multipoint games. Kucherov joined Steven Stamkos as the only players to do so.	January 6, 2026
Jon Cooper	First coach in Tampa Bay Lightning history to record 600 career wins with the franchise. Cooper did so in 1,006 games. Cooper was also the second fastest coach to record 600 wins in NHL history behind Scotty Bowman (1,002 games).	January 12, 2026
Nikita Kucherov	Tied for most consecutive multipoint games in Tampa Bay Lightning history. Kucherov joined Steven Stamkos as the only players to record the feat (9 games).	January 12, 2026
Nikita Kucherov	Second most goals in Tampa Bay Lightning history. Kucherov passed Vincent Lecavalier (383).	January 29, 2026
Brandon Hagel	Tied for fastest goal in Tampa Bay Lightning history (11 seconds). Hagel tied Dino Ciccarelli (Feb. 15, 1997, vs. Washington) and Ruslan Fedotenko (Feb. 4, 2006, vs. Washington). Hagel also set the record for the fastest goal in an NHL outdoor game and Tampa Bay Lighting outdoor game.	February 1, 2026
Darren Raddysh	Longest goal streak by a defensman in Tampa Bay Lightning history (4 games).	February 1, 2026
Nikita Kucherov	First player in Tampa Bay Lightning history to record 700 career assists with the franchise. Kucherov was the second fastest player born outside North America to record 700 assists. Kucherov also was only the third Russian born player to record 700 asssts.	February 25, 2026
Brayden Point	Seventh player in Tampa Bay Lightning history to play in 700 games with the franchise.	March 7, 2026
Nikita Kucherov	Second player in Tampa Bay Lightning history to record 1,100 points. Kucherov joined Steven Stamkos as the only players in team history.	March 13, 2026
Nikita Kucherov	Third most hattricks in Tampa Bay Lightning history. Kucherov passed Vincent Lecavalier (6).	March 17, 2026
Andrei Vasilevskiy	Tenth most games played in Tampa Bay Lightning history. Vasilevskiy passed Tyler Johnson (589).	March 26, 2026
Anthony Cirelli	Tenth most goals in Tampa Bay Lightning history. Cirelli passed Fredrik Modin (145).	April 2, 2026
Darren Raddysh	Most goals in a single season by a defensemen in Tampa Bay Lightning history. Raddysh passed Victor Hedman and Dan Boyle (20).	April 4, 2026
Nikita Kucherov	Second player in Tampa Bay Lightning history to record 400 regular season goals. Kucherov joined Steven Stamkos as the only players in franchise history to do so.	April 6, 2026
Nikita Kucherov	First player in Tampa Bay Lightning history to win the Hart Memorial Trophy multiple times with the team (2x). Nikita Kucherov and Martin St. Louis were the only players to win the award previously in team history.	June 11, 2026

Playoffs
Brandon Hagel	First player in Tampa Bay Lightning history to record a Gordie Howe hat trick in a playoff game.	April 21, 2026
Brandon Hagel	Tied for longest goal streak to start a playoff series Tampa Bay Lightning history. Hagel tied Steven Stamkos for the longest goal streak (4 games).	April 26, 2026
Dominic James	First rookie in Tampa Bay Lightning history to score a goal in a game 7 of a playoff series.	May 3, 2026

== Transactions ==
The Lightning have been involved in the following transactions during the 2025–26 season.

=== Trades ===
Date	Details		Ref
June 28, 2025	To Boston Bruins 4th-round pick in 2026	To Tampa Bay Lightning 2nd-round pick in 2025	
July 8, 2025	To Edmonton Oilers Isaac Howard	To Tampa Bay Lightning Sam O'Reilly	
October 16, 2025	To Los Angeles Kings Pheonix Copley	To Tampa Bay Lightning Future Considerations	
December 8, 2025	To Philadelphia Flyers Ethan Samson	To Tampa Bay Lightning Roman Schmidt	
December 28, 2025	To Minnesota Wild Boris Katchouk	To Tampa Bay Lightning Michael Milne	
March 6, 2026	To Los Angeles Kings 2nd-round pick in 2028	To Tampa Bay Lightning Corey Perry* (Note: Los Angeles retained 50% of Perry's contract.)	
March 12, 2026	To Detroit Red Wings Michael Milne; Wojciech Stachowiak	To Tampa Bay Lightning Ian Mitchell	
June 1, 2026	To Chicago Blackhawks 3rd-round pick in 2027	To Tampa Bay Lightning Jack Pridham	

=== Free agents ===
Date	Player	Team	Contract term	Ref
July 1, 2025	Nick Abruzzese	from Toronto Maple Leafs	1-year	
July 1, 2025	Simon Lundmark	from Winnipeg Jets	2-year	
July 1, 2025	Boris Katchouk	from Pittsburgh Penguins	1-year	
July 1, 2025	Pontus Holmberg	from Toronto Maple Leafs	2-year	
July 1, 2025	Nick Perbix	to Nashville Predators	2-year	
July 1, 2025	Matt Tomkins	to Edmonton Oilers	2-year	
July 2, 2025	Jakob Pelletier	from Philadelphia Flyers	3-year	
July 13, 2025	Scott Sabourin	from San Jose Sharks	1-year	

=== Waivers ===
Date	Player	Team	Ref
October 2, 2025	Pheonix Copley	from Los Angeles Kings	
October 6, 2025	Curtis Douglas	from Utah Mammoth	
February 7, 2026	Jack Finley	to St. Louis Blues	
March 6, 2026	Curtis Douglas	to Vancouver Canucks	

=== Contract terminations ===
Date	Player	Via	Ref
June 30, 2025	Conor Sheary	Contract termination	
December 3, 2025	Niko Huuhtanen	Contract termination	

=== Retirement ===
Date	Player	Ref

=== Signings ===
Key:

† Contract is entry-level.

Date	Player	Contract term	Ref
July 1, 2025	Gage Goncalves	2-year	
July 1, 2025	Ryan Fanti	1-year	
July 1, 2025	Tristan Allard	2-year†	
September 20, 2025	Dominic James	2-year†	
December 4, 2025	Ryan McDonagh	3-year	
December 27, 2025	J. J. Moser	8-year	
January 2, 2026	Charle-Edouard D'Astous	1-year	
May 19, 2026	Max Groshev	2-year	
May 19, 2026	Nick Abruzzese	1-year	
May 23, 2026	Scott Sabourin	1-year	
May 29, 2026	Benjamin Rautiainen	3-year†	

== Draft picks ==
Below are the Tampa Bay Lightning's selections at the 2025 NHL entry draft, which was held on June 27 and 28, 2025, at the Peacock Theater in Los Angeles, California.

Round	#	Player	Pos	Nationality	College/Junior/Club (League)
2	56 (Note: The Los Angeles Kings' second-round pick went to the Tampa Bay Lightning as the result of a trade on June 29, 2024, that sent Tanner Jeannot to Los Angeles in exchange for a fourth-round pick in 2024 and this pick.)	Ethan Czata	C	Canada	Niagara IceDogs (OHL)
4	108 (Note: The Detroit Red Wings' fourth-round pick went to the Lightning as the result of a trade on June 28, 2025, that sent a fourth-round pick in 2026 to Boston in exchange for this pick.)	Benjamin Rautiainen	C	Finland	Tappara (Liiga)
4	127 (Note: The Edmonton Oilers' fourth-round pick went to the Lightning as the result of a trade on March 6, 2024, that sent Adam Henrique to Edmonton in exchange for this pick (being conditional at the time of the trade). The condition – Tampa Bay will receive a fourth-round pick in 2025 if Edmonton does not win the Stanley Cup in 2024 – was converted when the Oilers lost the 2024 Stanley Cup Final on June 24, 2024.)	Aiden Foster	C	Canada	Prince George Cougars (WHL)
5	151	Everett Baldwin	D	United States	U.S. NTDP (USHL)
7	193 (Note: The San Jose Sharksꞌ seventh-round pick went to the Lightning as the result of a trade on March 7, 2024, that sent Jack Thompson and a third-round pick in 2024 to San Jose in exchange for Anthony Duclair and this pick.)	Caleb Heil	G	United States	Madison Capitals (USHL)
7	206 (Note: The Utah Mammothꞌs seventh-round pick went to the Lightning as the result of a trade on March 8, 2024, that sent a fifth-round pick in 2027 to the Arizona Coyotes in exchange for Matt Dumba and this pick.)	Roman Luttsev	C	Russia	Loko Yaroslavl (MHL)
7	212 (Note: The Minnesota Wild's seventh-round pick went to the Lightning as the result of a trade on November 8, 2023, that sent Zach Bogosian to Minnesota in exchange for this pick.)	Grant Spada	D	Canada	Guelph Storm (OHL)
7	215	Marco Mignosa	RW	Canada	Soo Greyhounds (OHL)
