= 2026–27 Tampa Bay Lightning season =

National Hockey League season

2026–27 Tampa Bay Lightning
- Division: Atlantic
- Conference: Eastern
- 2026–27 record: 7–3–1
- Home record: 5–0–0
- Road record: 2–3–1
- Goals for: 38
- Goals against: 34

Team information
- General manager: Julien BriseBois
- Coach: Jon Cooper
- Captain: Victor Hedman
- Alternate captains: Nikita Kucherov; Ryan McDonagh
- Arena: Benchmark International Arena
- Minor league affiliates: Syracuse Crunch (AHL); Orlando Solar Bears (ECHL)

Team leaders
- Goals: Jake Guentzel; Brandon Hagel (7)
- Assists: Nikita Kucherov (10)
- Points: Nikita Kucherov (14)
- Penalty minutes: Jeffrey Viel (16)
- Plus/minus: Erik Černák (+7)
- Wins: Andrei Vasilevskiy (5)
- Goals against average: Andrei Vasilevskiy (2.78)

The 2026–27 Tampa Bay Lightning season is the 35th season for the National Hockey League (NHL) franchise that was established on December 16, 1991.

== Off-season ==
=== May ===
On May 19, 2026, the Lightning re-signed defenseman Max Groshev to a two year contract. Groshev skated in two games with the Lightning in the prior season, recording one assist.

That same day the Lightning re-signed Nick Abruzzese to a one year contract. Abruzzese appeared in 56 games with the Syracuse Crunch last sesason, recording 16 goals and 36 points. Abruzzese also had 4 points in four games in the playoffs with the Crunch.

On May 23, 2026, the Lightning re-signed Scott Sabourin to a one year contract. Sabourin appeared in 26 games, recording a goal and 4 assists. Sabourin also appeared in two games in the playoffs with the Lightning.

On May 29, 2026, the Lightning signed prospect Benjamin Rautiainen to a three year entry level contract. Rautiainen was selected by the Lightning in the fourth round of the 2025 NHL draft. In the prior season Rautiainen tied Saku Koivu as the youngest players to ever reach 70 points in the Liiga (20 years old). He also was tied for 7th most points in a single season (77 points), and sixth most assists (52) in a single season.

=== June ===
On June 1, 2026, the Lightning traded a third round pick in the 2027 NHL draft to the Chicago Blackhawks in exchange for the rights to forward prospect Jack Pridham. Pridham was originally drafted by the Blackhawks in the 2024 NHL draft. Pridham is committed to play college hockey for the upcoming season.

On June 3, 2026, Jon Cooper won the Jack Adams Award for the 2025–26 NHL season. Cooper became the second coach in franchise history to win the award, following John Tortorella (2004). This was also Cooper's third time being a finalist for the award in his career.

On June 6, 2026, Andrei Vasilevskiy won his second career Vezina Trophy after being named a finalist for the sixth time in his career. Vasilevskiy recorded 39 wins in 58 starts in the 2025–26 season, and also became just the sixth goalie in NHL history to record nine 30 win seasons. His nine consecutive 30 win seasons only trails Martin Brodeur (12).

On June 11, 2026, Nikita Kucherov won his second career Hart Memorial Trophy. Kucherov became the third player in NHL history to have gone at least seven years between winning the award, joining Jean Béliveau and Sidney Crosby. Kucherov was also the fifth winger in NHL history to win the award multiple times, joining Alexander Ovechkin, Bill Cowley, Bobby Hull and Guy Lafleur.

On June 19, 2026, Darren Raddysh was traded to the Toronto Maple Leafs. The Lightning acquired a fifth round pick in the 2026 NHL entry draft in exchange for the sign and trade for the unrestricted free agent defenseman. Raddysh originally joined team via free agency in 2021.

On June 22, 2026, the Lightning extended their minor league affiliation with the Orlando Solar Bears for two more years. The Lightning have been affiliated with the ECHL's Solar Bears since the 2018–19 season.

=== July ===
The Lightning were involved in the following player transactions (signings and trades) on the first day of free agency (July 1st).

The Lightning signed forward Ilya Mikheyev to a 4-year contract with an annual cap hit of $3.85 million. Last season Mikheyev averaged 17:25 minutes of ice time and recorded 18 goals and 36 points with the Chicago Blackhawks.

The Lightning signed forward Jeffrey Viel to a 5-year contract with a $2.5 million cap hit. Viel appeared in 10 games with the Boston Bruins last season prior to being traded to the Anaheim Ducks. Viel skated in 45 games and recorded 10 points and 49 penalty minutes last season. Viel also has appeared in 99 career NHL games, recording 15 points and 232 penalty minutes.

The Lightning announced the signing of goaltenders Mads Søgaard and Olivier Rodrigue, and defenseman Michael Callahan at the same time. All three players were signed to 1-year contracts that carried a cap hit of $850,000.

The Lightning signed defenseman John Carlson to a 2-year contract for $17 million. Carlson record 60 points (14 goals and 46 assists) last season between the Washington Capitals and Anaheim Ducks. Carlson is a former Stanley Cup champion (2018) and has over 700 points in his NHL career.

The Lightning traded forward Nick Paul to the Toronto Maple Leafs in exchange for goaltender Dennis Hildeby, a 3rd-round pick in the 2028 NHL entry draft and a 4th-round pick in the 2027 NHL entry draft. Paul spent four and half seasons with the Lightning, recording two 20-goal seasons and reaching 40-points two times. Hildeby recorded a .914 save percentage and 2.80 save percentage this past season with the Leafs.

On July 3, 2026, the Lightning signed forward Jansen Harkins to a one-year contract. Harkins appeared in 44 games with the ducks last season, recording 3 goals and 8 points. Harkins also has appeared in 305 NHL games, recording 18 goals and 45 points.

That same day the Lightning defensive prospect Tomas Kralovic to a 3-year entry level contract. Kralovic was selected by the Lightning in the 3rd-round of the 2026 NHL entry draft. Last season Kralovic recorded 6 goals and 25 assists in 52 games with HC Slovan Bratislava. He also recorded 4 goals and six points in 17 playoff games.

== Training camp ==
=== September ===
On September 11, 2026, the Lightning signed forward Kole Lind to a professional tryout agreement. Lind spent the past season playing for the Texas Stars of the American Hockey League. Lind has 454 career AHL games played, recording 319 points. Lind has also appeared in 31 NHL games, recording 2 goals and 8 points.

On September 16, 2026, the Lightning announced that forward Yanni Gourde underwent hip surgery in the offseason and that Gourde will be out of the lineup until December. The Lightning also announced that forward Dominic James broke his right hand while training in the offseason and that James would miss the first two weeks of the regular season.

That same day the Lightning announced that it had signed forward Luke Glendening to a professional tryout agreement. Glendenning played for the New Jersey Devils and Philadelphia Flyers the prior season. Glendening also previously played two seasons with the Lightning (2023-25), recording 14 goals and 18 points.

On September 21, 2026, the Lightning announced that it had reduced its training camp roster by 7-players. Ethan Czata, Aiden Foster, Oleg Kulebiakin, Stepan Shurygin, Cooper Soller, Grant Spada, and Max Vilen we reassigned to their respective junior hockey clubs.

On September 25, 2026, the Lightning reduced their training camp roster by 21 players. Tristan Allard, Cooper Flinton, Ethan Gauthier, Dyllan Gill, Jonas Johansson, Tomas Kralovic, Connor Kurth, Harrison Meneghin, Milo Roelens and Gabriel Szturc were assigned to the Syracuse Crunch of the American Hockey League.

The Lightning released Clark Bishop, Shawn Element, Brendan Furry, Luke Glendening, Kole Lind, Tommy Miller, and Zach Uens from their PTOs they signed prior to training camp starting.

The Lightning also placed Simon Lundmark, Olivier Rodrigue and Steven Santini on waivers for purposes of assignment to the Syracuse Crunch.

On September 25, 2026, the Lightning traded goaltender Jonas Johansson to the Ottawa Senators in exchange for future considerations. Last season Johansson recorded a 3.29 GAA and a .884 save percentage. Johansson also appeared in 70 games with the Lightning, recording a record of 32-23-10.

On September 27, 2026, the Lightning reduced their training camp roster by 11 players. Dylan Duke, Lucas Mercuri, Sam O'Reilly, Noah Steen were assigned to the Syracuse Crunch. Matteo Pietroniro and Jarred Tinordi were released from their professional tryout agreements. Also, Nick Abruzzese, Max Groshev, and Jakob Pelletier were placed on waivers for purposes of assignment to Syracuse.

On September 28, 2026, the Lightning announced its opening night roster for the 2026–27 season.

Forwards

Anthony Cirelli, Conor Geekie, Zemgus Girgensons, Gage Goncalves, Brandon Hagel, Jake Guentzel, Jansen Harkins, Pontus Holmberg, Nikita Kucherov, Ilya Mikheyev, Brayden Point, Scott Sabourin and Jeffrey Viel.

Defense

John Carlson, Erik Černák, Max Crozier, Charle-Edouard D'Astous, Victor Hedman, Emil Lilleberg, Ryan McDonagh and J.J. Moser

Goaltenders

Andrei Vasilevskiy and Dennis Hildeby

The Lightning also announced that Benjamin Rautiainen has been loaned to Tappara of the Liiga in Finland, and that forwards Yanni Gourde and Dominic James will begin the season on injured reserve.

== Standings ==
=== Divisional standings ===
Atlantic Division
Pos	Team	GP	W	L	OTL	RW	GF	GA	GD	Pts
1	Tampa Bay Lightning	22	15	5	2	13	82	62	+20	32
2	Montreal Canadiens	23	14	5	4	9	74	67	+7	32
3	Ottawa Senators	23	14	6	3	11	75	68	+7	31
4	Boston Bruins	22	14	7	1	11	76	56	+20	29
5	Florida Panthers	23	12	8	3	10	72	68	+4	27
6	Buffalo Sabres	22	9	9	4	7	64	77	−13	22
7	Detroit Red Wings	22	8	11	3	6	58	68	−10	19
8	Toronto Maple Leafs	24	8	13	3	7	75	86	−11	19

Updated to game(s) played on November 19, 2026. Source: National Hockey League
Rules for classification: 1) Fewer number of games played (GP, only during regular season); 2) Greater number of regulation wins (RW); 3) Greater number of wins in regulation and overtime, excluding shootout wins (ROW); 4) Greater number of total wins, including shootouts (W); 5) Greater number of points earned in head-to-head play; if teams played an uneven number of head-to-head games, the result of the first game on the home ice of the team with the extra home game is discarded; 6) Greater goal differential (GD); 7) Greater number of goals scored (GF)

=== Conference standings ===
Eastern Conference Wild Card
Pos	Div	Team	GP	W	L	OTL	RW	GF	GA	GD	Pts
1	AT	Boston Bruins	22	14	7	1	11	76	56	+20	29
2	AT	Florida Panthers	23	12	8	3	10	72	68	+4	27
3	ME	New York Islanders	21	10	6	5	8	68	61	+7	25
4	AT	Buffalo Sabres	22	9	9	4	7	64	77	−13	22
5	ME	Philadelphia Flyers	25	8	11	6	7	63	85	−22	22
6	ME	Washington Capitals	20	10	10	0	8	67	76	−9	20
7	AT	Detroit Red Wings	22	8	11	3	6	58	68	−10	19
8	AT	Toronto Maple Leafs	24	8	13	3	7	75	86	−11	19
9	ME	Columbus Blue Jackets	20	8	12	0	3	50	65	−15	16
10	ME	Pittsburgh Penguins	21	7	12	2	3	64	76	−12	16

Updated to game(s) played on November 19, 2026. Source: National Hockey League
Rules for classification: 1) Fewer number of games played (GP, only during regular season); 2) Greater number of regulation wins (RW); 3) Greater number of wins in regulation and overtime, excluding shootout wins (ROW); 4) Greater number of total wins, including shootouts (W); 5) Greater number of points earned in head-to-head play; if teams played an uneven number of head-to-head games, the result of the first game on the home ice of the team with the extra home game is discarded; 6) Greater goal differential (GD); 7) Greater number of goals scored (GF)

== Schedule and results ==
=== Preseason ===
2026 preseason game log: 2–1–1 (Home: 1–0–1; Road: 1–1–0)

Game	Date	Opponent	Score	OT	Location	Attendance	Record
1	September 20	Nashville	2–1		Benchmark International Arena	13,374	1–0–0
2	September 22	@ Nashville	2–3	OT	Bridgestone Arena	17,690	1–1–0
3	September 24	Florida	3–5		Benchmark International Arena	14,666	1–1–1
4	September 26	@ Florida	3–2	SO	Amerant Bank Arena	18,494	2–1–1

Lightning score listed first;

Win Loss Overtime/shootout loss

=== Regular season ===
2026–27 game log
October: 8–3–2, 18 points (Home: 6–0–0; Road: 2–3–2)

Game	Date	Opponent	Score	OT	Decision	Location	Attendance	Record	Points	Recap
1	October 1	@ New York Rangers	1–5		Vasilevskiy	Madison Square Garden	18,006	0–1–0	0	
2	October 3	Washington Capitals	3–1		Vasilevskiy	Benchmark International Arena	19,092	1–1–0	2	
3	October 5	Philadelphia Flyers	4–1		Vasilevskiy	Benchmark International Arena	19,092	2–1–0	4	
4	October 8	Minnesota Wild	3–2		Hildeby	Benchmark International Arena	19,092	3–1–0	6	
5	October 10	@ New York Islanders	5–3		Vasilevskiy	UBS Arena	17,345	4–1–0	8	
6	October 13	@ New York Rangers	1–4		Vasilevskiy	Madison Square Garden	17,076	4–2–0	8	
7	October 15	Seattle Kraken	4–3	OT	Vasilevskiy	Benchmark International Arena	19,092	5–2–0	10	
8	October 17	Vancouver Canucks	4–2		Hildeby	Benchmark International Arena	19,092	6–2–0	12	
9	October 20	@ Vegas Golden Knights	6–2		Vasilevskiy	T-Mobile Arena	17,017	7–2–0	14	
10	October 23	@ Colorado Avalanche	3–6		Vasilevskiy	Ball Arena	18,104	7–3–0	14	
11	October 24	@ Utah Mammoth	4–5	OT	Hildeby	Delta Center	14,111	7–3–1	15	
12	October 29	Winnipeg Jets	6–4		Vasilevskiy	Benchmark International Arena	19,092	8–3–1	17	
13	October 31	@ Nashville Predators	4–5	SO	Vasilevskiy	Bridgestone Arena	17,180	8–3–2	18	

November: 5–1–0, 10 points (Home: 2–0–0; Road: 3–1–0)

Game	Date	Opponent	Score	OT	Decision	Location	Attendance	Record	Points	Recap
14	November 3	Detroit Red Wings	4–2		Vasilevskiy	Benchmark International Arena	19,092	9–3–2	20	
15	November 5	Chicago Blackhawks	4–1		Vasilevskiy	Benchmark International Arena	19,092	10–3–2	22	
16	November 7	@ Minnesota Wild	4–3	OT	Hildeby	Grand Casino Arena	19,155	11–3–2	24	
17	November 8	@ Winnipeg Jets	3–4		Vasilevskiy	Canada Life Centre	14,307	11–4–2	24	
18	November 11	@ Buffalo Sabres	8–3		Vasilevskiy	KeyBank Center	19,070	12–4–2	26	
19	November 12	@ Columbus Blue Jackets	3–1		Hildeby	Nationwide Arena	15,101	13–4–2	28	
20	November 14	Detroit Red Wings	0–2		Vasilevskiy	Benchmark International Arena	19,092	13–5–2	28	
21	November 17	Washington Capitals	5–2		Vasilevskiy	Benchmark International Arena	19,092	14–5–2	30	
22	November 19	Edmonton Oilers	3–1		Vasilevskiy	Benchmark International Arena	19,092	15–5–2	32	
23	November 22	Buffalo Sabres	–			Benchmark International Arena		0–0–0		
24	November 25	Carolina Hurricanes	–			Benchmark International Arena		0–0–0		
25	November 27	Ottawa Senators	–			Benchmark International Arena		0–0–0		
26	November 28	@ Florida Panthers	–			Amerant Bank Arena		0–0–0		

December: 0–0–0, 0 points (Home: 0–0–0; Road: 0–0–0)

Game	Date	Opponent	Score	OT	Decision	Location	Attendance	Record	Points	Recap
27	December 2	@ Montreal Canadiens	–			Bell Centre		0–0–0		
28	December 5	@ Ottawa Senators	–			Canadian Tire Centre		0–0–0		
29	December 7	Columbus Blue Jackets	–			Benchmark International Arena		0–0–0		
30	December 10	Boston Bruins	–			Benchmark International Arena		0–0–0		
31	December 12	Pittsburgh Penguins	–			Benchmark International Arena		0–0–0		
32	December 13	@ St. Louis Blues	–			Enterprise Center		0–0–0		
33	December 15	@ Pittsburgh Penguins	–			PPG Paints Arena		0–0–0		
34	December 17	Calgary Flames	–			Benchmark International Arena		0–0–0		
35	December 19	@ Toronto Maple Leafs	–			Scotiabank Arena		0–0–0		
36	December 20	@ Detroit Red Wings	–			Little Caesars Arena		0–0–0		
37	December 22	St. Louis Blues	–			Benchmark International Arena		0–0–0		
38	December 26	@ Florida Panthers	–			Amerant Bank Arena		0–0–0		
39	December 28	@ Carolina Hurricanes	–			Lenovo Center		0–0–0		
40	December 29	Nashville Predators	–			Benchmark International Arena		0–0–0		
41	December 31	Montreal Canadiens	–			Benchmark International Arena		0–0–0		

January: 0–0–0, 0 points (Home: 0–0–0; Road: 0–0–0)

Game	Date	Opponent	Score	OT	Decision	Location	Attendance	Record	Points	Recap
42	January 2	Buffalo Sabres	–			Benchmark International Arena		0–0–0		
43	January 5	@ Seattle Kraken	–			Climate Pledge Arena		0–0–0		
44	January 7	@ Vancouver Canucks	–			Rogers Arena		0–0–0		
45	January 9	@ Calgary Flames	–			Scotiabank Saddledome		0–0–0		
46	January 11	@ Edmonton Oilers	–			Rogers Place		0–0–0		
47	January 14	Vegas Golden Knights	–			Benchmark International Arena		0–0–0		
48	January 16	Ottawa Senators	–			Benchmark International Arena		0–0–0		
49	January 18	@ Boston Bruins	–			TD Garden		0–0–0		
50	January 21	@ New Jersey Devils	–			Prudential Center		0–0–0		
51	January 23	@ Detroit Red Wings	–			Little Caesars Arena		0–0–0		
52	January 26	Los Angeles Kings	–			Benchmark International Arena		0–0–0		
53	January 30	New York Islanders	–			Benchmark International Arena		0–0–0		

February: 0–0–0, 0 points (Home: 0–0–0; Road: 0–0–0)

Game	Date	Opponent	Score	OT	Decision	Location	Attendance	Record	Points	Recap
54	February 2	@ Pittsburgh Penguins	–			PPG Paints Arena		0–0–0		
55	February 3	@ Philadelphia Flyers	–			Xfinity Mobile Arena		0–0–0		
56	February 12	Dallas Stars	–			Benchmark International Arena		0–0–0		
57	February 13	Colorado Avalanche	–			Benchmark International Arena		0–0–0		
58	February 16	Florida Panthers	–			Benchmark International Arena		0–0–0		
59	February 18	Anaheim Ducks	–			Benchmark International Arena		0–0–0		
60	February 20	Toronto Maple Leafs	–			Benchmark International Arena		0–0–0		
61	February 23	San Jose Sharks	–			Benchmark International Arena		0–0–0		
62	February 25	@ Dallas Stars	–			American Airlines Center		0–0–0		
63	February 27	@ Carolina Hurricanes	–			Lenovo Center		0–0–0		
64	February 28	Utah Mammoth	–			Benchmark International Arena		0–0–0		

March: 0–0–0, 0 points (Home: 0–0–0; Road: 0–0–0)

Game	Date	Opponent	Score	OT	Decision	Location	Attendance	Record	Points	Recap
65	March 3	@ Los Angeles Kings	–			Crypto.com Arena		0–0–0		
66	March 5	@ Anaheim Ducks	–			Honda Center		0–0–0		
67	March 6	@ San Jose Sharks	–			SAP Center		0–0–0		
68	March 8	@ Chicago Blackhawks	–			United Center		0–0–0		
69	March 11	New Jersey Devils	–			Benchmark International Arena		0–0–0		
70	March 13	New York Islanders	–			Benchmark International Arena		0–0–0		
71	March 15	@ Washington Capitals	–			Capital One Arena		0–0–0		
72	March 17	@ Toronto Maple Leafs	–			Scotiabank Arena		0–0–0		
73	March 18	@ Montreal Canadiens	–			Bell Centre		0–0–0		
74	March 20	@ Ottawa Senators	–			Canadian Tire Centre		0–0–0		
75	March 23	Florida Panthers	–			Benchmark International Arena		0–0–0		
76	March 25	Philadelphia Flyers	–			Benchmark International Arena		0–0–0		
77	March 27	New York Rangers	–			Benchmark International Arena		0–0–0		
78	March 30	Toronto Maple Leafs	–			Benchmark International Arena		0–0–0		

April: 0–0–0, 0 points (Home: 0–0–0; Road: 0–0–0)

Game	Date	Opponent	Score	OT	Decision	Location	Attendance	Record	Points	Recap
79	April 1	Columbus Blue Jackets	–			Benchmark International Arena		0–0–0		
80	April 3	@ Boston Bruins	–			TD Garden		0–0–0		
81	April 5	@ Buffalo Sabres	–			KeyBank Center		0–0–0		
82	April 6	@ New Jersey Devils	–			Prudential Center		0–0–0		
83	April 8	Montreal Canadiens	–			Benchmark International Arena		0–0–0		
84	April 10	Boston Bruins	–			Benchmark International Arena		0–0–0		

Lightning score listed first;

Win Loss Overtime/shootout loss

== Roster ==
Updated October 17, 2026

No.	Nat	Player	Pos	S/G	Age	Acquired	Birthplace
74	(United States)	John Carlson	D	R	36	2026	Natick, Massachusetts
81	(Slovakia)	Erik Černák	D	R	29	2017	Košice, Slovakia
71	(Canada)	Anthony Cirelli	C	L	29	2015	Woodbridge, Ontario
24	(Canada)	Max Crozier	D	R	26	2019	North Vancouver, British Columbia
51	(Canada)	Charle-Edouard D'Astous	D	L	28	2025	Rimouski, Quebec
94	(Canada)	Conor Geekie	C	L	22	2024	Minnedosa, Manitoba
28	(Latvia)	Zemgus Girgensons	LW	L	32	2024	Riga, Latvia
93	(Canada)	Gage Goncalves	C	R	25	2020	Mission, British Columbia
37	(Canada)	Yanni Gourde	C	L	34	2025	Saint-Narcisse, Quebec
59	(United States)	Jake Guentzel	LW	L	32	2024	Omaha, Nebraska
38	(Canada)	Brandon Hagel	LW	L	28	2022	Saskatoon, Saskatchewan
77	(Sweden)	Victor Hedman (C)	D	L	35	2009	Örnsköldsvik, Sweden
35	(Sweden)	Dennis Hildeby	G	L	25	2026	Järfälla, Sweden
29	(Sweden)	Pontus Holmberg	RW	L	27	2025	Västerås, Sweden
17	(United States)	Dominic James	C	L	24	2025	Plymouth, Michigan
86	(Russia)	Nikita Kucherov (A)	RW	L	33	2011	Maykop, Russia
78	(Norway)	Emil Lilleberg	D	L	25	2023	Sarpsborg, Norway
27	(United States)	Ryan McDonagh (A)	D	L	37	2024	Saint Paul, Minnesota
95	(Russia)	Ilya Mikheyev	RW	L	32	2026	Omsk, Russia
90	(Switzerland)	J. J. Moser	D	L	26	2024	Biel, Switzerland
21	(Canada)	Brayden Point	C	R	30	2014	Calgary, Alberta
49	(Canada)	Scott Sabourin	RW	R	34	2025	Orleans, Ontario
88	(Russia)	Andrei Vasilevskiy	G	L	32	2012	Tyumen, Russia
25	(Canada)	Jeffrey Viel	LW	L	29	2026	Rimouski, Quebec

== Player stats ==
November 20, 2026

=== Skaters ===
Regular season
Player	GP	G	A	Pts	+/−	PIM
Nikita Kucherov	22	9	22	31	14	6
Jake Guentzel	22	13	14	27	16	4
Brandon Hagel	20	13	11	24	3	6
John Carlson	22	7	13	20	8	2
Brayden Point	19	5	13	18	10	6
Anthony Cirelli	20	6	9	15	5	4
Charle-Edouard D'Astous	21	4	10	14	8	12
Pontus Holmberg	22	6	7	13	3	20
Ilya Mikheyev	22	5	3	8	2	6
Erik Černák	19	0	8	8	12	8
Victor Hedman	21	4	2	6	3	2
Conor Geekie	20	4	1	5	–1	2
Ryan McDonagh	22	2	3	5	12	4
Zemgus Girgensons	18	1	3	4	3	2
Jeffrey Viel	19	0	3	3	–2	30
Gage Goncalves	19	0	3	3	–1	0
Max Crozier	12	0	3	3	1	6
Scott Sabourin	8	1	1	2	3	17
Sam O'Reilly	5	1	1	2	2	0
Dominic James	6	0	2	2	1	4
Yanni Gourde	5	1	0	1	–1	2
J.J. Moser	22	0	1	1	3	14
Emil Lilleberg	8	0	0	0	–2	11
Jansen Harkins	2	0	0	0	–1	0

=== Goaltenders ===
Regular season
Player	GP	GS	TOI	W	L	OT	GA	GAA	SA	SV%	SO	G	A	PIM
Andrei Vasilevskiy	17	17	1108:02	11	5	1	44	2.59	419	.895	0	0	0	0
Dennis Hildeby	5	5	304:27	4	0	1	13	2.56	129	.899	0	0	0	0

^{†}Denotes player spent time with another team before joining Tampa Bay. Stats reflect time with Tampa Bay only.
^{‡}Traded from Tampa Bay mid-season.
Bold/italics denotes franchise record

== Suspensions/fines ==
Player	Explanation	Length	Salary	Date issued

== Awards and honours ==
=== Awards ===
Regular season
Player	Award	Awarded

=== Milestones ===
Regular season
Player	Milestone	Reached
Jeffrey Viel	100th career NHL game	October 1, 2026
Andrei Vasilevskiy	600th career NHL game	October 3, 2026
Brandon Hagel	4th career NHL hattrick	October 10, 2026
Ilya Mikheyev	100th career NHL goal	October 15, 2026
Anthony Cirelli	200th career NHL assist	October 29, 2026
Brayden Point	700th career NHL point	November 7, 2026
Erik Cernak	100th career NHL assist	November 9, 2026
Sam O'Reilly	1st career NHL game 1st career NHL point 1st career NHL assist	November 11, 2026
John Carlson	800th career NHL point	November 11, 2026
Nikita Kucherov	8th career NHL hattrick	November 11, 2026
Jake Guentzel	700th career NHL game	November 12, 2026
Nikita Kucherov	900th career NHL game	November 17, 2026
Sam O'Reilly	1st career NHL goal	November 17, 2026

=== Records ===
Regular season
Player	Record	Reached
Nikita Kucherov	Most times being involved in game opening scoring in Lightning history (170 games). Kucherov passed Vincent Lecavalier (169 games).	October 6, 2026
Nikita Kucherov	Most points in Tampa Bay Lightning history. Kucherov tied Steven Stamkos (1137).	October 20, 2026
Anthony Cirelli	Tenth most goals in Tampa Bay Lightning history. Cirelli tied Brad Richards (150).	October 20, 2026
Nikita Kucherov	Most points in Tampa Bay Lightning history. Kucherov passed Steven Stamkos (1137).	October 24, 2026
Brayden Point	Second most power-play goals in Tampa Bay Lightning history. Point tied Vincent Lecavalier (112).	October 24, 2026
Brayden Point	Sixth most power-play points in Tampa Bay Lightning history. Point passed Brad Richards (213).	October 24, 2026
Brayden Point	Second most power-play goals in Tampa Bay Lightning history. Point passed Vincent Lecavalier (112).	November 4, 2026
Brayden Point	Sixth player in Tampa Bay Lightning history to record 700 career points with the franchise. Point was also tied Martin St. Louis as the third fastest player in franchise history to reach 700 points (736 games).	November 11, 2026
Nikita Kucherov	Third most overtime goals in Tampa Bay Lightning history. Kucherov tied Martin St. Louis (10).	November 11, 2026
Nikita Kucherov	Second most hattricks in Tampa Bay Lightning history. Kucherov tied Martin St. Louis (8).	November 11, 2026
Nikita Kucherov	Most shot attempts in a single game in Tampa Bay Lightning history. Kucherov tied Steven Stamkos (April 10, 2010) and himself (April 9, 2025).	November 11, 2026
Nikita Kucherov	Fifth player in Tampa Bay Lightning history to play in 900 career games with the franchise.	November 17, 2026

== Transactions ==
The Lightning have been involved in the following transactions during the 2026–27 season.

=== Trades ===
Date	Details		Ref
June 19, 2026	To Toronto Maple Leafs Darren Raddysh	To Tampa Bay Lightning 5th-round pick in 2026	
June 27, 2026	To Edmonton Oilers 2nd-round pick in 2026; 5th-round pick in 2026	To Tampa Bay Lightning 2nd-round pick in 2026	
July 1, 2026	To Toronto Maple Leafs Nick Paul	To Tampa Bay Lightning Dennis Hildeby; 4th-round pick in 2027; 3rd-round pick in 2028	
September 26, 2026	To Ottawa Senators Jonas Johansson	To Tampa Bay Lightning Future Considerations	

=== Free agents ===
Date	Player	Team	Contract term	Ref
July 1, 2026	Ilya Mikheyev	from Chicago Blackhawks	4-year	
July 1, 2026	Jeffrey Viel	from Anaheim Ducks	5-year	
July 1, 2026	Michael Callahan	from Boston Bruins	1-year	
July 1, 2026	Mads Søgaard	from Ottawa Senators	1-year	
July 1, 2026	Olivier Rodrigue	from Chicago Blackhawks	1-year	
July 1, 2026	John Carlson	from Anaheim Ducks	2-year	
July 1, 2026	Oliver Bjorkstrand	to New York Rangers	1-year	
July 1, 2026	Mitchell Chaffee	to New York Islanders	1-year	
July 1, 2026	Declan Carlile	to Pittsburgh Penguins	2-year	
July 1, 2026	Brandon Halverson	to Dallas Stars	1-year	
July 1, 2026	Corey Perry	to Los Angeles Kings	1-year	
July 3, 2026	Jansen Harkins	from Anaheim Ducks	1-year	

=== Waivers ===
Date	Player	Team	Ref

=== Contract terminations ===
Date	Player	Via	Ref

=== Retirement ===
Date	Player	Ref

=== Signings ===
Key:

† Contract is entry-level.

Date	Player	Contract term	Ref
July 3, 2026	Tomas Kralovic	3-year†	

== Draft picks ==
Below are the Tampa Bay Lightning's selections at the 2026 NHL entry draft, which was held on June 26 and 27, 2026, at the KeyBank Center in Buffalo, New York.

Round	#	Player	Pos	Nationality	College/Junior/Club (League)
2	52^{1}	Oleg Kulebyakin	LW	Russia	Halifax Mooseheads (QMJHL)
3	90	Tomas Kralovic	D	Slovakia	HC Slovan Bratislava (SVK EL)
5	134^{2}	Morgan Anderberg	LW	Sweden	Växjö Lakers (SHL)
5	154	Cooper Soller	C	United States	Sioux Falls Stampede (USHL)
6	186	Stepan Shurygin	G	Russia	Saginaw Spirit (OHL)
7	218	Max Vilén	D	Sweden	Moncton Wildcats (QMJHL)

Notes

1. The Tampa Bay Lightning traded the 58th overall pick and 133rd overall pick to the Edmonton Oilers in exchange for the 52nd overall selection.
2. The Toronto Maple Leafs' fifth-round pick went to the Tampa Bay Lightning as the result of a trade on June 19, 2026, that sent Darren Raddysh to Toronto in exchange for this pick.
3. The Seattle Kraken's fifth-round pick went to the Tampa Bay Lightning as the result of a trade on March 5, 2025, that sent Mikey Eyssimont, conditional first-round picks in 2026 and 2027, and Toronto's second-round pick in 2025 to Seattle in exchange for Kyle Aucoin, Oliver Bjorkstrand, and this pick.
