= Jeff Finley =

Canadian ice hockey defenceman

- Born: April 14, 1967 (age 58) Edmonton, Alberta, Canada
- Height: 6 ft 2 in (188 cm)
- Weight: 205 lb (93 kg; 14 st 9 lb)
- Position: Defence
- Shot: Left
- Played for: New York Islanders; Philadelphia Flyers; Winnipeg Jets; Phoenix Coyotes; New York Rangers; St. Louis Blues
- NHL draft: 55th overall, 1985; New York Islanders
- Playing career: 1987–2006

John Jeffrey Finley (born April 14, 1967) is a Canadian former professional ice hockey player. In 708 career games in the National Hockey League, Finley scored 13 goals and 70 assists for 83 points.

== Career ==
Finley was drafted by the New York Islanders in the third round, 55th overall in the 1985 NHL Draft. He made his debut with the Islanders during 1987–1988 season, where he scored 5 assists in 10 games. Finley would bounce between the Islanders and the minors until the 1993–1994 season. In the next four years he would play with the Philadelphia Flyers, Winnipeg Jets, Phoenix Coyotes, and New York Rangers, along with a number of minor league affiliates.

Finley finally got the break he needed when he was traded to the St. Louis Blues during the 1998–1999 season. Under coach Joel Quenneville he earned a spot on the Blues roster as a defensive specialist and remained there until the 2003–2004 season. For the 2005–2006 season Finley played overseas in Germany for the Hannover Scorpions before retiring and moving to Kelowna, British Columbia. He then joined the Kelowna Rockets of the Western Hockey League (WHL) as their assistant coach, leading them to the 2009 Memorial Cup, before leaving in September 2009.

== Personal life ==
Finley’s son Jack plays for the St. Louis Blues in the NHL.

== Career statistics ==
=== Regular season and playoffs ===
			Regular season					Playoffs
Season	Team	League	GP	G	A	Pts	PIM	GP	G	A	Pts	PIM
1983–84	Portland Winterhawks	WHL	5	0	0	0	0	5	0	1	1	4
1983–84	Summerland Buckaroos	BCJHL	49	0	21	21	14	—	—	—	—	—
1984–85	Portland Winterhawks	WHL	69	6	44	50	57	6	1	2	3	2
1985–86	Portland Winterhawks	WHL	70	11	59	70	83	15	1	7	8	16
1986–87	Portland Winterhawks	WHL	72	13	53	66	113	20	1	21	22	27
1987–88	New York Islanders	NHL	10	0	5	5	15	1	0	0	0	2
1987–88	Springfield Indians	AHL	52	5	18	23	50	—	—	—	—	—
1988–89	New York Islanders	NHL	4	0	0	0	6	—	—	—	—	—
1988–89	Springfield Indians	AHL	65	3	16	19	55	—	—	—	—	—
1989–90	New York Islanders	NHL	11	0	1	1	0	5	0	2	2	2
1989–90	Springfield Indians	AHL	57	1	15	16	41	13	1	4	5	23
1990–91	New York Islanders	NHL	11	0	0	0	4	—	—	—	—	—
1990–91	Capital District Islanders	AHL	67	10	34	44	34	—	—	—	—	—
1991–92	New York Islanders	NHL	51	1	10	11	26	—	—	—	—	—
1991–92	Capital District Islanders	AHL	20	1	9	10	6	—	—	—	—	—
1992–93	Capital District Islanders	AHL	61	6	29	35	34	4	0	1	1	0
1993–94	Philadelphia Flyers	NHL	55	1	8	9	24	—	—	—	—	—
1994–95	Hershey Bears	AHL	36	2	9	11	33	6	0	1	1	8
1995–96	Winnipeg Jets	NHL	65	1	5	6	81	6	0	0	0	4
1995–96	Springfield Falcons	AHL	14	3	12	15	22	—	—	—	—	—
1996–97	Phoenix Coyotes	NHL	65	3	7	10	40	1	0	0	0	2
1997–98	New York Rangers	NHL	63	1	6	7	55	—	—	—	—	—
1998–99	New York Rangers	NHL	2	0	0	0	0	—	—	—	—	—
1998–99	Hartford Wolf Pack	AHL	42	2	10	12	28	—	—	—	—	—
1998–99	St. Louis Blues	NHL	30	1	2	3	20	13	1	2	3	8
1999–00	St. Louis Blues	NHL	74	2	8	10	38	7	0	2	2	4
2000–01	St. Louis Blues	NHL	72	2	8	10	38	2	0	0	0	0
2001–02	St. Louis Blues	NHL	78	0	6	6	30	10	0	0	0	0
2002–03	St. Louis Blues	NHL	64	1	3	4	46	6	0	0	0	6
2003–04	St. Louis Blues	NHL	53	0	1	1	34	1	0	0	0	2
2005–06	Hannover Scorpions	DEL	50	3	7	10	84	9	0	1	1	42
NHL totals			708	13	70	83	457	52	1	6	7	38
