= Curtis Douglas =

Canadian ice hockey player (born 2000)

- Born: March 6, 2000 (age 26) Oakville, Ontario, Canada
- Height: 6 ft 9 in (206 cm)
- Weight: 242 lb (110 kg; 17 st 4 lb)
- Position: Centre
- Shoots: Left
- NHL team Former teams: Seattle Kraken; Tampa Bay Lightning; Vancouver Canucks
- NHL draft: 104th overall, 2018; Dallas Stars
- Playing career: 2020–present

Curtis Douglas (born March 6, 2000) is a Canadian professional ice hockey player who is a centre for the Seattle Kraken of the National Hockey League (NHL). He was drafted by the 104th overall in the 2018 NHL entry draft by the Dallas Stars, and has previously played in the NHL for the Tampa Bay Lightning and Vancouver Canucks.

== Playing career ==
=== Junior ===
Douglas played for the Barrie Colts for one and a half seasons, before being traded midway in 2017–18 OHL season to the Windsor Spitfires. He would post his best numbers with the Spitfires, recording 30 goals and 30 assists for 60 points in the 2019–20 OHL season.

=== Professional ===
Douglas was drafted by the Dallas Stars 104th overall in the 4th round of the 2018 NHL Entry Draft. After a stint in the AlpsHL, he was assigned to the Belleville Senators in 2021. In the AHL, he spent his career with the Senators, Toronto Marlies, and Tucson Roadrunners.

After being claimed off waivers from the Utah Mammoth, Douglas made his NHL debut two days later on October 9, 2025, against the Ottawa Senators. He fought Kurtis MacDermid, recording his first penalty minutes in the game as the audience cheered on Douglas. He recorded his first point on November 12, 2025 against the New York Rangers, an assist on a Scott Sabourin goal. On March 5, 2026, Douglas was waived by Tampa Bay, and then claimed by the Vancouver Canucks the following day. Douglas scored his first goal on April 12, 2026 in a 4-3 win over the Anaheim Ducks.

On July 1 2026, having left the Canucks after a brief tenure, Douglas was signed as a free agent to a two-year, $2.5 million contract with the Seattle Kraken.

== Career statistics ==
			Regular season					Playoffs
Season	Team	League	GP	G	A	Pts	PIM	GP	G	A	Pts	PIM
2016–17	Barrie Colts	OHL	53	4	5	9	19	—	—	—	—	—
2017–18	Barrie Colts	OHL	28	7	11	18	37	—	—	—	—	—
2017–18	Windsor Spitfires	OHL	38	15	13	28	28	6	1	3	4	4
2018–19	Windsor Spitfires	OHL	66	27	26	53	74	4	0	0	0	0
2019–20	Windsor Spitfires	OHL	62	30	30	60	59	—	—	—	—	—
2020–21	Belleville Senators	AHL	11	1	3	4	8	—	—	—	—	—
2021–22	Toronto Marlies	AHL	67	13	21	34	86	—	—	—	—	—
2022–23	Toronto Marlies	AHL	13	0	1	1	30	—	—	—	—	—
2022–23	Tucson Roadrunners	AHL	50	8	6	14	119	2	0	1	1	0
2023–24	Tucson Roadrunners	AHL	57	5	16	21	148	2	0	1	1	0
2024–25	Tucson Roadrunners	AHL	63	10	13	23	117	3	0	0	0	2
2025–26	Tampa Bay Lightning	NHL	29	0	2	2	92	—	—	—	—	—
2025–26	Syracuse Crunch	AHL	6	0	1	1	0	—	—	—	—	—
2025–26	Vancouver Canucks	NHL	14	1	1	2	16	—	—	—	—	—
NHL totals			43	1	3	4	108	—	—	—	—	—
