= 2026–27 Montreal Canadiens season =

Season of play of professional ice hockey team

2026–27 Montreal Canadiens
- Division: Atlantic
- Conference: Eastern
- 2026–27 record: 14–5–4
- Home record: 5–3–3
- Road record: 9–2–1
- Goals for: 74
- Goals against: 67

Team information
- General manager: Kent Hughes
- Coach: Martin St. Louis
- Captain: Nick Suzuki
- Alternate captains: Josh Anderson; Mike Matheson
- Arena: Bell Centre
- Minor league affiliates: Laval Rocket (AHL); Trois-Rivières Lions (ECHL)

Team leaders
- Goals: Cole Caufield (12)
- Assists: Lane Hutson (19)
- Points: Lane Hutson (24)
- Penalty minutes: Arber Xhekaj (32)
- Plus/minus: Nick Suzuki (+10)
- Wins: Jacob Fowler (10)
- Goals against average: Jacob Fowler (2.19)

The 2026–27 Montreal Canadiens season is the 118th for the club that was established on December 4, 1909, and their 110th season as a franchise in the National Hockey League (NHL).

== Standings ==
=== Divisional standings ===
Atlantic Division
Pos	Team	GP	W	L	OTL	RW	GF	GA	GD	Pts
1	Tampa Bay Lightning	21	14	5	2	12	79	61	+18	30
2	Ottawa Senators	22	14	6	2	11	70	62	+8	30
3	Montreal Canadiens	22	13	5	4	9	72	66	+6	30
4	Boston Bruins	22	14	7	1	11	76	56	+20	29
5	Florida Panthers	23	12	8	3	10	72	68	+4	27
6	Buffalo Sabres	21	8	9	4	6	58	74	−16	20
7	Detroit Red Wings	22	8	11	3	6	58	68	−10	19
8	Toronto Maple Leafs	23	8	13	2	7	72	82	−10	18

Updated to game(s) played on November 18, 2026. Source: National Hockey League
Rules for classification: 1) Fewer number of games played (GP, only during regular season); 2) Greater number of regulation wins (RW); 3) Greater number of wins in regulation and overtime, excluding shootout wins (ROW); 4) Greater number of total wins, including shootouts (W); 5) Greater number of points earned in head-to-head play; if teams played an uneven number of head-to-head games, the result of the first game on the home ice of the team with the extra home game is discarded; 6) Greater goal differential (GD); 7) Greater number of goals scored (GF)

=== Conference standings ===
Eastern Conference Wild Card
Pos	Div	Team	GP	W	L	OTL	RW	GF	GA	GD	Pts
1	AT	Boston Bruins	22	14	7	1	11	76	56	+20	29
2	AT	Florida Panthers	23	12	8	3	10	72	68	+4	27
3	ME	New York Islanders	20	10	6	4	8	65	57	+8	24
4	ME	Washington Capitals	19	10	9	0	8	64	70	−6	20
5	AT	Buffalo Sabres	21	8	9	4	6	58	74	−16	20
6	ME	Philadelphia Flyers	24	7	11	6	7	57	80	−23	20
7	AT	Detroit Red Wings	22	8	11	3	6	58	68	−10	19
8	AT	Toronto Maple Leafs	23	8	13	2	7	72	82	−10	18
9	ME	Pittsburgh Penguins	20	7	11	2	3	62	71	−9	16
10	ME	Columbus Blue Jackets	19	7	12	0	2	46	63	−17	14

Updated to game(s) played on November 18, 2026. Source: National Hockey League
Rules for classification: 1) Fewer number of games played (GP, only during regular season); 2) Greater number of regulation wins (RW); 3) Greater number of wins in regulation and overtime, excluding shootout wins (ROW); 4) Greater number of total wins, including shootouts (W); 5) Greater number of points earned in head-to-head play; if teams played an uneven number of head-to-head games, the result of the first game on the home ice of the team with the extra home game is discarded; 6) Greater goal differential (GD); 7) Greater number of goals scored (GF)

== Schedule and results ==
=== Preseason ===
The preseason schedule was published on June 26, 2026.

2026 preseason game log: 4–1–0 (Home: 3–0–0; Road: 1–1–0)
#	Date	Visitor	Score	Home	OT	Decision	Attendance	Record	Recap
1	September 19^{A}	Toronto	3–4	Montreal	OT	Fowler	20,962	1–0–0
2	September 19^{A}	Montreal	4–1	Toronto		Kahkonen	16,267	2–0–0
3	September 21^{B}	Ottawa	2–3	Montreal	OT	Dobes	4,390	3–0–0
4	September 26^{A}	Ottawa	2–4	Montreal		Montembeault	20,962	4–0–0
5	September 26^{A}	Montreal	3–4	Ottawa		Dobes	14,032	4–1–0
Notes:^{A} Split-squad game.^{B} Game played at Colisée Vidéotron in Trois-Rivières, Quebec.

=== Regular season ===
The regular season schedule was released on July 16, 2026.

2026–27 game log

September: 1–0–0 (home: 0–0–0; road: 1–0–0)
#	Date	Visitor	Score	Home	OT	Decision	Attendance	Record	Pts	Recap
1	September 29	Montreal	3–2	Toronto		Dobeš	19,088	1–0–0	2

October: 8–3–2 (home: 4–2–1; road: 4–1–1)
#	Date	Visitor	Score	Home	OT	Decision	Attendance	Record	Pts	Recap
2	October 3	Montreal	5–6	Pittsburgh	OT	Dobeš	18,382	1–0–1	3
3	October 6	Carolina	6–4	Montreal		Dobeš	20,962	1–1–1	3
4	October 8	Nashville	5–2	Montreal		Fowler	20,962	1–2–1	3
5	October 10	Detroit	0–1	Montreal	SO	Fowler	20,962	2–2–1	5
6	October 13	Buffalo	3–4	Montreal	SO	Fowler	20,962	3–2–1	7
7	October 14	Montreal	4–5	Washington		Dobeš	16,719	3–3–1	7
8	October 17	Buffalo	3–4	Montreal	OT	Fowler	20,962	4–3–1	9
9	October 20	San Jose	4–3	Montreal	OT	Dobeš	20,962	4–3–2	10
10	October 23	Montreal	4–1	Chicago		Fowler	19,592	5–3–2	12
11	October 25	Montreal	2–1	Winnipeg		Fowler	32,342 (outdoors)	6–3–2	14
12	October 27	Montreal	2–0	St. Louis		Fowler	16,234	7–3–2	16
13	October 29	Montreal	5–2	Dallas		Dobeš	18,532	8–3–2	18
14	October 31	Pittsburgh	4–5	Montreal		Fowler	20,962	9–3–2	20

November: 5–2–2 (home: 1–1–2; road: 4–1–0)
#	Date	Visitor	Score	Home	OT	Decision	Attendance	Record	Pts	Recap
15	November 3	Winnipeg	5–4	Montreal	OT	Fowler	20,962	9–3–3	21
16	November 5	Utah	4–5	Montreal	OT	Dobeš	20,962	10–3–3	23
17	November 7	Montreal	4–2	Toronto		Fowler	19,253	11–3–3	25
18	November 10	Minnesota	2–1	Montreal	OT	Fowler	20,962	11–3–4	26
19	November 12	Montreal	5–2	Boston		Fowler	17,850	12–3–4	28
20	November 14	Colorado	4–1	Montreal		Dobeš	20,962	12–4–4	28
21	November 16	Montreal	1–3	NY Rangers		Fowler	18,006	12–5–4	28
22	November 18	Montreal	3–2	New Jersey		Fowler	16,514	13–5–4	30
23	November 19	Montreal	2–1	Carolina	OT	Dobeš	18,838	14–5–4	32
24	November 21	Philadelphia	–	Montreal
25	November 23	Los Angeles	–	Montreal
26	November 25	Montreal	–	Colorado
27	November 28	Montreal	–	Vegas
28	November 30	Montreal	–	Utah

December: 0–0–0 (home: 0–0–0; road: 0–0–0)
#	Date	Visitor	Score	Home	OT	Decision	Attendance	Record	Pts	Recap
29	December 2	Tampa Bay	–	Montreal
30	December 5	Florida	–	Montreal
31	December 6	Ottawa	–	Montreal
32	December 8	Vegas	–	Montreal
33	December 10	Anaheim	–	Montreal
34	December 12	Montreal	–	Columbus
35	December 14	Edmonton	–	Montreal
36	December 18	Montreal	–	Buffalo
37	December 19	Montreal	–	Minnesota
38	December 22	Montreal	–	Columbus
39	December 26	Toronto	–	Montreal
40	December 27	Dallas	–	Montreal
41	December 29	Columbus	–	Montreal
42	December 31	Montreal	–	Tampa Bay

January: 0–0–0 (home: 0–0–0; road: 0–0–0)
#	Date	Visitor	Score	Home	OT	Decision	Attendance	Record	Pts	Recap
43	January 2	Montreal	–	Florida
44	January 4	Chicago	–	Montreal
45	January 6	Boston	–	Montreal
46	January 9	Pittsburgh	–	Montreal
47	January 13	New Jersey	–	Montreal
48	January 14	Montreal	–	Nashville
49	January 16	Montreal	–	Philadelphia
50	January 18	Montreal	–	Buffalo
51	January 19	Montreal	–	Washington
52	January 21	St. Louis	–	Montreal
53	January 23	Calgary	–	Montreal
54	January 26	Carolina	–	Montreal
55	January 28	Montreal	–	Calgary
56	January 30	Montreal	–	Edmonton

February: 0–0–0 (home: 0–0–0; road: 0–0–0)
#	Date	Visitor	Score	Home	OT	Decision	Attendance	Record	Pts	Recap
57	February 1	Montreal	–	Vancouver
58	February 3	Montreal	–	Seattle
59	February 13	Washington	–	Montreal
60	February 14	NY Rangers	–	Montreal
61	February 18	Montreal	–	Detroit
62	February 20	NY Islanders	–	Montreal
63	February 22	Montreal	–	Philadelphia
64	February 24	Montreal	–	Los Angeles
65	February 27	Montreal	–	Anaheim

March: 0–0–0 (home: 0–0–0; road: 0–0–0)
#	Date	Visitor	Score	Home	OT	Decision	Attendance	Record	Pts	Recap
66	March 1	Montreal	–	San Jose
67	March 4	Seattle	–	Montreal
68	March 6	Vancouver	–	Montreal
69	March 9	Montreal	–	NY Islanders
70	March 10	Boston	–	Montreal
71	March 13	Montreal	–	Ottawa
72	March 16	Florida	–	Montreal
73	March 18	Tampa Bay	–	Montreal
74	March 20	Montreal	–	Detroit
75	March 22	Toronto	–	Montreal
76	March 24	Ottawa	–	Montreal
77	March 27	New Jersey	–	Montreal
78	March 28	Detroit	–	Montreal
79	March 30	Montreal	–	Boston

April: 0–0–0 (home: 0–0–0; road: 0–0–0)
#	Date	Visitor	Score	Home	OT	Decision	Attendance	Record	Pts	Recap
80	April 1	NY Rangers	–	Montreal
81	April 4	Montreal	–	NY Islanders
82	April 6	Montreal	–	Florida
83	April 8	Montreal	–	Tampa Bay
84	April 10	Montreal	–	Ottawa

Legend: Win (2 points) Loss (0 points) Overtime/shootout loss (1 point)

== Roster ==
Updated November 16, 2026

No.	Nat	Player	Pos	S/G	Age	Acquired	Birthplace
17	(Canada)	Josh Anderson (A)	RW	R	32	2020	Burlington, Ontario
62	(Canada)	Owen Beck	C	R	22	2022	Port Hope, Ontario
37	(United States)	Brett Berard	LW	L	24	2026	East Greenwich, Rhode Island
76	(Canada)	Zachary Bolduc	LW	L	23	2025	Trois-Rivières, Quebec
45	(Canada)	Alexandre Carrier	D	R	30	2024	Quebec City, Quebec
13	(United States)	Cole Caufield	RW	R	25	2019	Mosinee, Wisconsin
77	(Canada)	Kirby Dach	C	R	25	2022	Fort Saskatchewan, Alberta
24	(Canada)	Phillip Danault	C	L	33	2025	Victoriaville, Quebec
93	(Russia)	Ivan Demidov	RW	L	20	2024	Sergiyev Posad, Russia
75	(Czech Republic)	Jakub Dobeš	G	L	25	2020	Ostrava, Czech Republic
53	(Canada)	Noah Dobson	D	R	26	2025	Summerside, Prince Edward Island
42	(Sweden)	Adam Engström	D	L	23	2022	Jarna, Sweden
71	(Canada)	Jake Evans	C	R	30	2014	Toronto, Ontario
32	(United States)	Jacob Fowler	G	L	22	2023	Melbourne, Florida
21	(Canada)	Kaiden Guhle	D	L	24	2020	Sherwood Park, Alberta
48	(United States)	Lane Hutson	D	L	22	2022	Holland, Michigan
91	(Finland)	Oliver Kapanen	C	R	23	2021	Timrå, Sweden
22	(United States)	Chris Kreider	LW	L	35	2026	Boxford, Massachusetts
8	(Canada)	Mike Matheson (A)	D	L	32	2022	Pointe-Claire, Quebec
35	(Canada)	Sam Montembeault	G	L	30	2021	Bécancour, Quebec
15	(Canada)	Alex Newhook	C	L	25	2023	St. John's, Newfoundland
64	(Austria)	David Reinbacher	D	R	22	2023	Hohenems, Austria
20	(Slovakia)	Juraj Slafkovský	LW	L	22	2022	Košice, Slovakia
14	(Canada)	Nick Suzuki (C)	C	R	27	2018	London, Ontario
85	(France)	Alexandre Texier	LW	L	27	2025	Saint-Martin-d'Hères, France
72	(Canada)	Arber Xhekaj	D	L	25	2021	Hamilton, Ontario
63	(Canada)	Florian Xhekaj	LW	L	22	2023	Hamilton, Ontario

== Player statistics ==
=== Skaters ===
Regular season

=== Goaltenders ===
Regular season

== Awards and honours ==
=== Awards ===
Regular season

=== Milestones ===
Regular season
Florian Xhekaj	1st career NHL goal	October 27, 2026
Josh Anderson	700th career NHL game	October 27, 2026
Phillip Danault	800th career NHL game	October 31, 2026

== Transactions ==
The Canadiens have been involved in the following transactions during the 2026–27 season.

=== Key ===
† Contract is entry-level.
‡ Contract initially takes effect in the 2027–28 season.

=== Trades ===
Date	Details		Ref
June 25, 2026	To Columbus Blue Jackets Luke Tuch	To Montreal Canadiens Hunter McKown	
June 26, 2026	To New York Rangers William Trudeau	To Montreal Canadiens Brett Berard	
June 26, 2026	To Vegas Golden Knights 1st-round pick in 2026 (28th overall); 3rd-round pick in 2027	To Montreal Canadiens DAL 1st-round pick in 2026 (26th overall)	
June 27, 2026	To Carolina Hurricanes 2nd-round pick in 2026 (61st overall); 4th-round pick in 2026 (125th overall)	To Montreal Canadiens MIN 2nd-round pick in 2026 (57th overall)	
June 27, 2026	To Los Angeles Kings NJD 4th-round pick in 2026 (103rd overall)	To Montreal Canadiens 4th-round pick in 2026 (113th overall); COL 6th-round pick in 2026 (190th overall)	
June 27, 2026	To Vegas Golden Knights LAK 4th-round pick in 2026 (113th overall)	To Montreal Canadiens PHI 4th-round pick in 2026 (117th overall); 7th-round pick in 2026 (223rd overall)	
June 27, 2026	To Los Angeles Kings VGK 7th-round pick in 2026 (223rd overall)	To Montreal Canadiens 7th-round pick in 2027	
June 29, 2026	To Vancouver Canucks Brendan Gallagher^{1}	To Montreal Canadiens Future considerations	
June 29, 2026	To Utah Mammoth Joshua Roy	To Montreal Canadiens Maksymilian Szuber	
July 27, 2026	To Anaheim Ducks Sean Farrell	To Montreal Canadiens Sasha Pastujov	

==== Notes ====
1. The Canadiens will retain 50% of Gallagher's remaining salary until the end of the current season.

=== Players acquired ===
Date	Player	Former team (League)	Term	Via	Ref
July 1, 2026	Samuel Poulin	Edmonton Oilers	1-year	Free agency	
July 1, 2026	Ethan Samson	Tampa Bay Lightning	1-year	Free agency	
July 8, 2026	Reilly Walsh	Barys Astana (KHL)	1-year	Free agency	
September 12, 2026	Chris Kreider	Anaheim Ducks	1-year	Free agency	

=== Players lost ===
Date	Player	New team (League)	Term	Via	Ref
July 1, 2026	Sammy Blais	Ottawa Senators	2-year	Free agency	
July 1, 2026	Marc Del Gaizo	New York Rangers	2-year	Free agency	
July 1, 2026	Joe Veleno	New York Rangers	1-year	Free agency	
July 2, 2026	Gannon Laroque			Retirement	
July 23, 2026	Hunter Shepard	Barys Astana (KHL)	1-year	Free agency	
August 13, 2026	Jake Chiasson	New Mexico Goatheads (ECHL)	1-year	Free agency	

=== Signings ===
Date	Player	Term	Ref
July 1, 2026	Alex Belzile	1-year	
July 1, 2026	Ivan Demidov	8-year^{‡}	
July 1, 2026	Kaapo Kahkonen	1-year	
July 2, 2026	Jakub Dobes	3-year^{‡}	
July 9, 2026	Brett Berard	1-year	
July 10, 2026	Bogdan Konyushkov	2-year^{†}	
July 16, 2026	Kirby Dach	1-year	
July 20, 2026	Jared Davidson	1-year	
July 20, 2026	Hunter McKown	1-year	
August 3, 2026	Maksymilian Szuber	1-year	
August 13, 2026	Sasha Pastujov	1-year	
September 13, 2026	Zachary Bolduc	4-year	
September 15, 2026	Alex Newhook	4-year^{‡}	
September 15, 2026	Arber Xhekaj	1-year	

== Draft picks ==
Below are the Montreal Canadiens' selections at the 2026 NHL entry draft, which was held on June 26–27, 2026, at the KeyBank Center in Buffalo, New York.

Round	#	Player	Pos.	Nationality	Team (League)
1	26 (Note: The Dallas Stars' first-round pick went to Montreal as the result of a trade on June 26, 2026, that sent a first-round pick in 2026 (28th overall) and a third-round pick in 2027 to the Vegas Golden Knights in exchange for this pick. Vegas previously acquired this pick as the result of a trade on June 26, 2026, that sent Pavel Dorofeyev to the New York Rangers in exchange for Buffalo's third-round pick in 2026 (92nd overall), a conditional first-round pick in 2028, and this pick. New York previously acquired this pick as the result of a trade on July 1, 2025, that sent K'Andre Miller to the Carolina Hurricanes in exchange for Scott Morrow, a second-round pick in 2026 (64th overall), and this pick (being conditional at the time of the trade). The condition – the Rangers will receive Dallas' first-round pick in 2026 if it is outside of the top ten selections, and more favorable than Carolina's first round selection – was converted when Dallas qualified for the 2026 Stanley Cup playoffs on March 22, 2026 and on May 1, 2026, when they were eliminated from the 2026 Stanley Cup playoffs. Carolina previously acquired this pick as the result of a trade on March 7, 2025, that sent Mikko Rantanen to Dallas in exchange for Logan Stankoven, a conditional first-round pick in 2028, third-round picks in 2026 and 2027, and this pick (being conditional at the time of the trade). The condition – Carolina will receive Dallas' first-round pick in 2026 if it is outside of the top ten selections – was converted when Dallas qualified for the 2026 Stanley Cup playoffs on March 22, 2026.)	Gleb Pugachyov	RW	Russia	Torpedo Nizhny Novgorod (KHL)
2	57 (Note: The Minnesota Wild's second-round pick went to Montreal as the result of a trade on June 27, 2026, that sent a second-round pick in 2026 (61st overall) and a fourth-round pick in 2026 (125th overall) to the Carolina Hurricanes in exchange for this pick. Carolina previously acquired this pick as the result of a trade on June 26, 2026, that sent a 2026 first-round pick (31st overall) to the Nashville Predators in exchange for a 2026 second-round pick (42nd overall) and this pick. Nashville previously acquired this pick as the result of a trade on March 1, 2025, that sent Gustav Nyquist to Minnesota in exchange for this pick.)	Timofei Runtso	D	United States	Victoria Royals (WHL)
3	93	Cooper Cleaves	D	United States	Dartmouth Big Green (ECAC)
4	117 (Note: The Philadelphia Flyers' fourth-round pick went to Montreal as the result of a trade on June 27, 2026, that sent Los Angeles' fourth-round pick in 2026 (113th overall) to the Vegas Golden Knights in exchange for a seventh-round pick in 2026 (223rd overall), and this pick. Vegas previously acquired this pick as the result of a trade on June 26, 2026, that sent a 2026 first-round pick (28th overall) to the Anaheim Ducks in exchange for Colorado's 2026 first-round pick (29th overall) and this pick. Anaheim previously acquired this pick as the result of a trade on June 23, 2025, that sent Trevor Zegras to Philadelphia in exchange for Ryan Poehling, Columbus' second-round pick in 2025 (45th overall) and this pick.)	Brayden Klimpke	D	Canada	Saskatoon Blades (WHL)
6	189	Parker Trottier	LW	United States	U.S. NTDP (USHL)
6	190 (Note: The Colorado Avalanche's sixth-round pick went to Montreal as the result of a trade on June 27, 2026, that sent New Jersey's fourth-round pick in 2026 (103rd overall) to the Los Angeles Kings in exchange for a fourth-round pick in 2026 (113th overall), and this pick. Los Angeles previously acquired this pick as the result of a trade on June 28, 2025, that sent Jordan Spence to the Ottawa Senators in exchange for Nashville's third-round pick in 2025 (67th overall) and this pick. Ottawa previously acquired this pick as the result of a trade on July 15, 2024, that sent Kevin Mandolese and a seventh-round pick in 2026 (215th overall) to Colorado in exchange for this pick.)	Wesley Royston	RW	Canada	Owen Sound Attack (OHL)
7	221	Jean-Samuel Daigneault	D	Canada	Muskegon Lumberjacks (USHL)
7	224 (Note: The Carolina Hurricanes' seventh-round pick went to Montreal as the result of a trade on June 30, 2025, that sent Cayden Primeau to Carolina in exchange for this pick.)	Tyler Deakos	RW	Canada	Waterloo Black Hawks (USHL)
