= Dominic James =

Dominic James may refer to:

- Dominic James (basketball)
- Dominic James (ice hockey)
- Dominic James (producer)
- Dominic "Dom" James, a fictional character in the 2021 film Space Jam: A New Legacy.

== See also ==
- Dominic Janes, American child actor
