= Jack Finley =

Canadian-American ice hockey player (born 2002)

- Born: September 2, 2002 (age 24) St. Louis, Missouri, U.S.
- Height: 6 ft 6 in (198 cm)
- Weight: 227 lb (103 kg; 16 st 3 lb)
- Position: Forward
- Shoots: Right
- NHL team (P) Cur. team Former teams: St. Louis Blues; Springfield Thunderbirds (AHL); Tampa Bay Lightning
- NHL draft: 57th overall, 2020; Tampa Bay Lightning
- Playing career: 2021–present

Jack Finley (born September 2, 2002) is a Canadian–American professional ice hockey player who is a forward for the Springfield Thunderbirds of the American Hockey League (AHL) while under contract to the St. Louis Blues of the National Hockey League (NHL).

== Playing career ==
=== Juniors ===
Finley was selected by the Spokane Chiefs sixth-overall in the 2017 WHL Prospects draft. Finley would go onto be drafted 57th overall by the Tampa Bay Lightning at the 2020 NHL entry draft.

On December 12, 2020, the Tampa Bay Lightning signed Finley to a three-year entry-level contract.

While serving as captain for the Chiefs in the 2021–22 season, Finley was traded to the Winnipeg Ice. Before joining the ice, Finley skated in 152 games with the Chiefs, recording 36 goals and 57 assists.

=== Professional ===
During the 2024–25 season, on January 14, 2025, Finley made his NHL debut with the Lightning against the Boston Bruins at TD Garden. He signed a three-year contract with the Lightning on June 8, 2025.

On February 7, 2026, Finley was claimed off waivers by the St. Louis Blues, after being waived by the Lightning the previous day.

== Personal life ==
Jack is the son of former NHL defenseman Jeff Finley.

== Career statistics ==
=== Regular season and playoffs ===
			Regular season					Playoffs
Season	Team	League	GP	G	A	Pts	PIM	GP	G	A	Pts	PIM
2017–18	Penticton Vees	BCHL	2	1	0	1	0	—	—	—	—	—
2017–18	Spokane Chiefs	WHL	7	0	1	1	8	—	—	—	—	—
2018–19	Spokane Chiefs	WHL	63	9	10	19	44	15	1	7	8	8
2019–20	Spokane Chiefs	WHL	61	19	38	57	32	—	—	—	—	—
2020–21	Spokane Chiefs	WHL	1	0	0	0	0	—	—	—	—	—
2020–21	Syracuse Crunch	AHL	2	0	0	0	0	—	—	—	—	—
2021–22	Spokane Chiefs	WHL	21	8	8	16	40	—	—	—	—	—
2021–22	Winnipeg Ice	WHL	39	19	15	34	28	15	7	6	13	20
2022–23	Syracuse Crunch	AHL	67	12	9	21	49	—	—	—	—	—
2023–24	Syracuse Crunch	AHL	52	13	19	32	29	2	0	0	0	0
2024–25	Syracuse Crunch	AHL	40	14	14	28	24	3	0	0	0	5
2024–25	Tampa Bay Lightning	NHL	1	0	0	0	0	—	—	—	—	—
2025–26	Tampa Bay Lightning	NHL	22	2	1	3	21	—	—	—	—	—
2025–26	Syracuse Crunch	AHL	3	1	2	3	0	—	—	—	—	—
2025–26	St. Louis Blues	NHL	22	0	2	2	17	—	—	—	—	—
NHL totals			45	2	3	5	38	—	—	—	—	—

=== International ===
Year	Team	Event	Result	GP	G	A	Pts	PIM
2018	Canada Black	U17	5th	5	0	2	2	14
Junior totals				5	0	2	2	14
