= Maxim Groshev (ice hockey) =

Russian ice hockey player (born 2001)

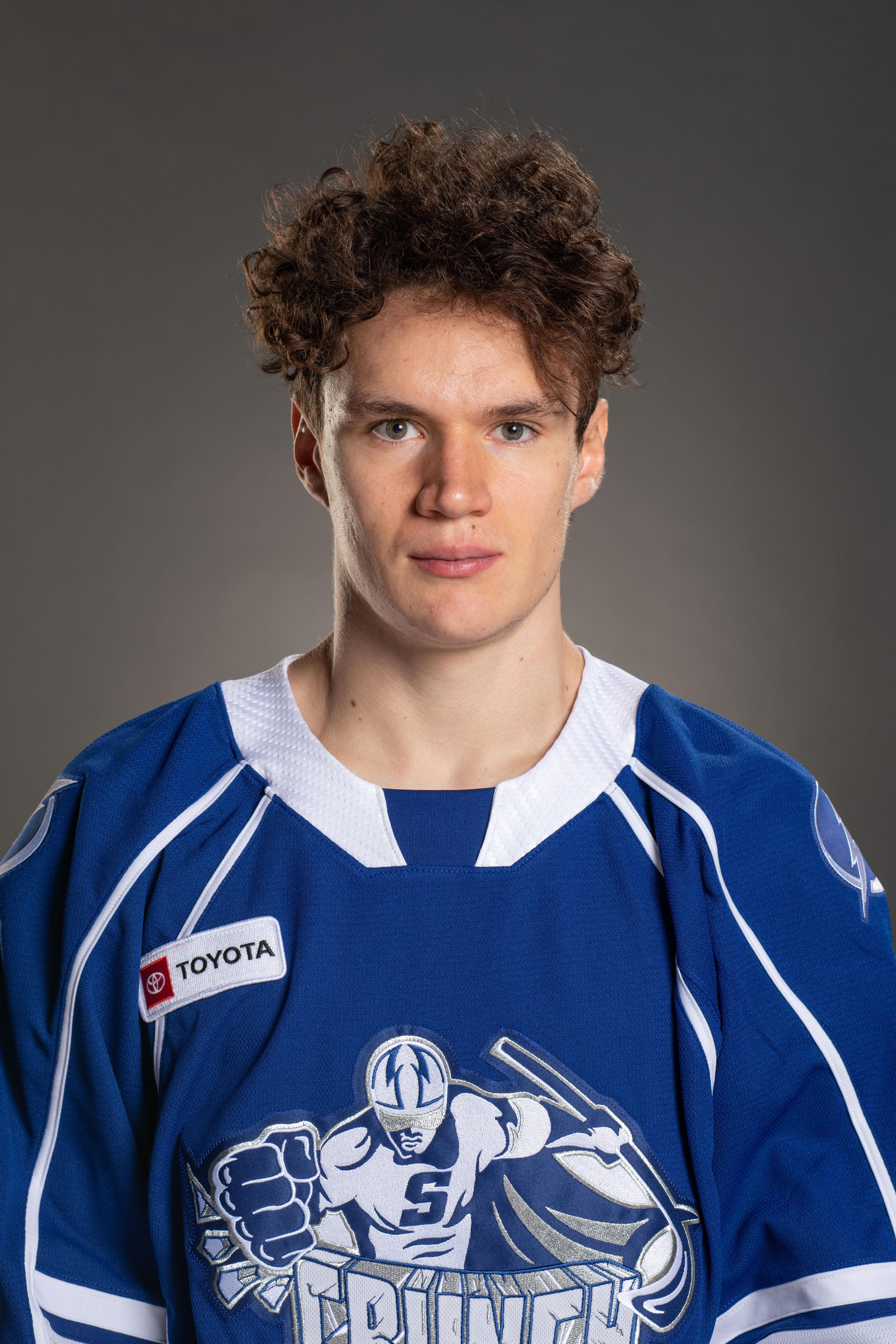
- Groshev with the Syracuse Crunch in 2023
- Born: December 14, 2001 (age 24) Agryz, Tatarstan, Russia
- Height: 6 ft 2 in (188 cm)
- Weight: 196 lb (89 kg; 14 st 0 lb)
- Position: Defence
- Shoots: Left
- NHL team (P) Cur. team Former teams: Tampa Bay Lightning; Syracuse Crunch (AHL); Neftekhimik Nizhnekamsk; SKA Saint Petersburg
- NHL draft: 85th overall, 2020; Tampa Bay Lightning
- Playing career: 2019–present

Maxim Groshev (born December 14, 2001) is a Russian professional ice hockey player who is a defenceman for the Syracuse Crunch in the American Hockey League (AHL) while under contract to the Tampa Bay Lightning of the National Hockey League (NHL).

== Playing career ==
=== Junior ===
Groshev played five seasons in the Kontinental Hockey League development system prior to being drafted 85th overall in the 2020 NHL entry draft by the Tampa Bay Lightning.

Groshev also played for Russia at the 2020 and 2021 World Junior Ice Hockey Championships. In the 2020 tournament he won a silver medal with team Russia.

On May 1, 2023, the Lightning signed Groshev to a three-year entry level contract. The prior season Groshev appeared in 34 games with SKA Saint Petersburg (KHL), recording 4 goals and six points. Groshev also recorded 9 goals and 18 points in 22 games with SKA's team that plays in the VHL.

=== Professional ===
During the 2023–24 AHL season the Lightning had Groshev change positions from wing to defenceman.

On December 28, 2025, Groshev was recalled by the Lightning to its NHL roster from the Syracuse Crunch of the American Hockey League. Groshev has appeared in 27 games with the Crunch this season, recording a goal and 12 points. Groshev also has appeared in 150 career games with the Crunch, recording 18 goals and 56 points.

The following day Groshev made his National Hockey League debut in a 5–4 shootout win over the visiting Montreal Canadiens at Benchmark International Arena. Groshev also recorded his first career NHL assist and point in the victory.

== Career statistics ==
=== Regular season and playoffs ===
			Regular season					Playoffs
Season	Team	League	GP	G	A	Pts	PIM	GP	G	A	Pts	PIM
2018–19	Nizhnekamsk Reaktor	MHL	47	7	13	20	18	–	–	–	–	–
2019–20	Nizhnekamsk Reaktor	MHL	8	3	2	5	0	–	–	–	–	–
2019–20	Nizhnekamsk Neftekhimik	KHL	36	1	6	7	4	3	0	0	0	0
2020–21	Neva SKA	VHL	1	0	0	0	0	–	–	–	–	–
2020–21	Nizhnekamsk Reaktor	MHL	1	0	0	0	0	—	—	—	—	—
2020–21	Nizhnekamsk Neftekhimik	KHL	17	0	2	2	2	—	—	—	—	—
2020–21	Saint Petersburg SKA	KHL	18	1	0	1	8	—	—	—	—	—
2021–22	Neva SKA	VHL	16	1	11	12	4	—	—	—	—	—
2021–22	Saint Petersburg SKA	KHL	3	0	1	1	0	—	—	—	—	—
2022–23	Neva SKA	VHL	22	9	9	18	10	—	—	—	—	—
2022–23	Saint Petersburg SKA	KHL	34	4	2	6	4	—	—	—	—	—
2023–24	Syracuse Crunch	AHL	67	10	20	30	24	7	0	1	1	4
2024–25	Syracuse Crunch	AHL	56	7	7	14	21	3	0	0	0	0
2025–26	Syracuse Crunch	AHL	58	3	18	21	22	4	0	1	1	4
2025–26	Tampa Bay Lightning	NHL	2	0	1	1	0	—	—	—	—	—
KHL totals			108	6	11	17	18	4	0	0	0	0
NHL totals			2	0	1	1	0	—	—	—	—	—

=== International ===
Year	Team	Event	Result	GP	G	A	Pts	PIM
2019	Russia	U18	2nd place, silver medalist(s)	7	3	1	4	0
2020	Russia	WJC	2nd place, silver medalist(s)	7	0	0	0	0
2021	Russia	WJC	4th	7	0	2	2	2
Junior totals				21	3	3	6	2
