= Simon Lundmark =

Swedish ice hockey player (born 2000)

- Born: 8 October 2000 (age 25) Stockholm, Sweden
- Height: 6 ft 2 in (188 cm)
- Weight: 190 lb (86 kg; 13 st 8 lb)
- Position: Defence
- Shoots: Right
- NHL team (P) Cur. team Former teams: Tampa Bay Lightning; Syracuse Crunch (AHL); Linköping HC
- NHL draft: 51st overall, 2019; Winnipeg Jets
- Playing career: 2017–present

Simon Lundmark (born 8 October 2000) is a Swedish professional ice hockey defenceman currently playing for the Syracuse Crunch of the American Hockey League (AHL) as a prospect to the Tampa Bay Lightning of the National Hockey League (NHL).

== Playing career ==
Lundmark was selected 51st overall by the Winnipeg Jets in the 2019 NHL entry draft. He was signed by the Jets to a three-year, entry-level contract on 9 April 2021. Lundmark played the entirety of his contract in the AHL with the Jets AHL affiliate, the Manitoba Moose.

Following his fourth season within the Jets organization, Lundmark left as a free agent and was signed to a two-year, two-way contract with the Tampa Bay Lightning on 1 July 2025.

== Career statistics ==
=== Regular season and playoffs ===
			Regular season					Playoffs
Season	Team	League	GP	G	A	Pts	PIM	GP	G	A	Pts	PIM
2016–17	Linköping HC	J20	3	0	1	1	0	2	0	0	0	0
2017–18	Linköping HC	J20	43	6	15	21	10	3	0	0	0	2
2017–18	Linköping HC	SHL	3	0	0	0	0	—	—	—	—	—
2018–19	Linköping HC	J20	25	2	15	17	10	6	1	3	4	2
2018–19	Linköping HC	SHL	28	0	3	3	6	—	—	—	—	—
2019–20	Linköping HC	J20	15	2	6	8	4	—	—	—	—	—
2019–20	Linköping HC	SHL	40	0	3	3	6	—	—	—	—	—
2020–21	Linköping HC	SHL	47	2	8	10	6	—	—	—	—	—
2020–21	Linköping HC	J20	3	0	1	1	6	—	—	—	—	—
2021–22	Manitoba Moose	AHL	57	4	10	14	14	—	—	—	—	—
2022–23	Manitoba Moose	AHL	64	3	14	17	18	3	0	0	0	0
2023–24	Manitoba Moose	AHL	67	5	12	17	22	2	0	0	0	0
2024–25	Manitoba Moose	AHL	66	4	10	14	28	—	—	—	—	—
2025–26	Syracuse Crunch	AHL	54	1	10	11	22	—	—	—	—	—
2025–26	Tampa Bay Lightning	NHL	1	0	0	0	0	—	—	—	—	—
SHL totals			118	2	14	16	18	—	—	—	—	—
NHL totals			1	0	0	0	0	—	—	—	—	—

=== International ===
Year	Team	Event	Result	GP	G	A	Pts	PIM
2016	Sweden	U17	1st place, gold medalist(s)	6	0	0	0	2
Junior totals				6	0	0	0	2
