= Charle-Edouard D'Astous =

Canadian ice hockey player (born 1998)

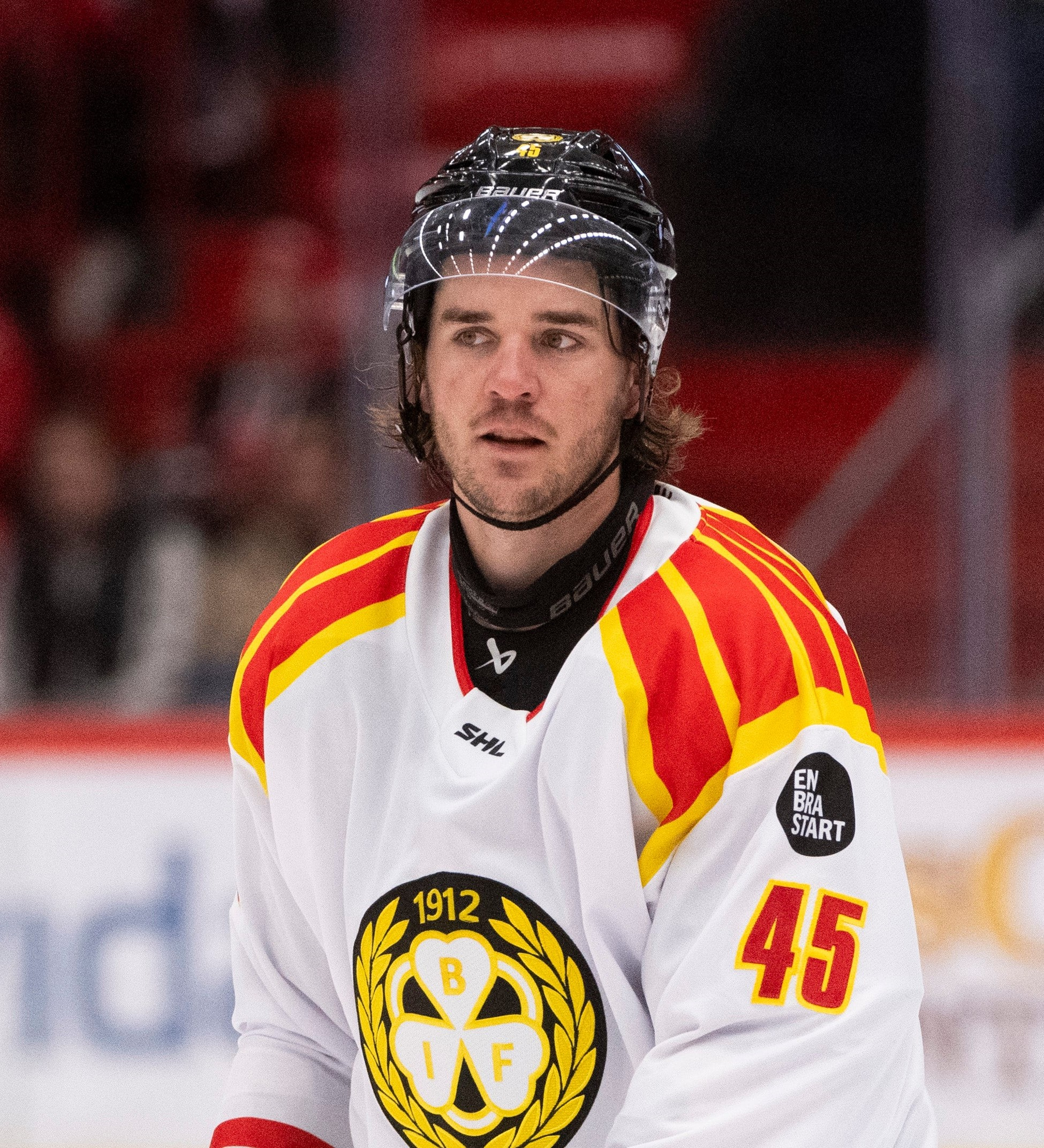
- D'Astous in 2025
- Born: April 21, 1998 (age 28) Rimouski, Quebec, Canada
- Height: 6 ft 2 in (188 cm)
- Weight: 211 lb (96 kg; 15 st 1 lb)
- Position: Defence
- Shoots: Left
- NHL team Former teams: Tampa Bay Lightning; KooKoo; Brynäs IF
- NHL draft: Undrafted
- Playing career: 2019–present

Charle-Edouard D'Astous (born April 21, 1998) is a Canadian professional ice hockey player who is a defenceman for the Tampa Bay Lightning of the National Hockey League (NHL).

== Playing career ==
=== Junior ===
D'Astous played four seasons with the Rimouski Océanic of the Quebec Major Junior Hockey League where he recorded 49 goals, 132 assists and 181 points over 244 games. His accomplishments with the Océanic included being named a second team all star (2017–18), winning the Emile Bouchard Trophy as the league's top defenseman and the QMJHL Humanitarian of the Year for his off the ice efforts in his community.

At the conclusion of his junior career D'Astous signed a two-year contract with the Grand Rapids Griffins of the American Hockey League.

=== Professional ===
D'Astous signed a one-year contract with the Colorado Eagles after spending two seasons between the Griffins and playing with Toledo Walleye of the ECHL. He spent most of that 2021-2022 season with the Utah Grizzlies of the ECHL. In 52 regular season games with Utah, D'Astous scored 26 goals, tying him for 3rd all-time for goals by a defenseman in a single season. In the ensuing playoffs, D'Astous set an ECHL record for goals in a playoff year with 19 goals in 18 games, a remarkable record to set as a defenseman and with Utah not making the finals. D'Astous opted to head to Europe after being unable to maintain a steady role in the AHL.

D'Astous joined the KooKoo of the Finnish Liiga on two-year contract. D'Astous would play 110 games with the Kookoo, recording 24 goals and 69 points. He would also win the Pekka Rautakallio trophy as the league's top defenseman and also win the Juha Rantasila Trophy as the league's top scorer among defensemen.

D'Astous left the KooKoo to sign with Brynäs IF of the Swedish Hockey League. D'Astous recorded 12 goals and 39 points that season in helpin Brynäs to a first-place finish and reaching the finals in the playoffs. At the end of the season D'Astous signed a one-year contract with the Tampa Bay Lightning of the National Hockey League.

D'Astous was called up to the Lightning's NHL roster on October 20, 2025. D'Astous made his NHL debut five days later in a 4–3 Lightning victory over the Anaheim Ducks at Benchmark International Arena.

On October 28th 2025, D'Astous scored his first NHL goal in a 5–2 win over the Nashville Predators

== Career statistics ==
			Regular season					Playoffs
Season	Team	League	GP	G	A	Pts	PIM	GP	G	A	Pts	PIM
2015–16	Rimouski Océanic	QMJHL	63	4	15	19	64	4	0	0	0	6
2016–17	Rimouski Océanic	QMJHL	67	13	27	40	40	4	0	0	0	2
2017–18	Rimouski Océanic	QMJHL	59	18	38	56	96	7	1	7	8	12
2018–19	Rimouski Océanic	QMJHL	55	14	52	66	68	13	1	14	15	12
2019–20	Toledo Walleye	ECHL	46	3	19	22	50	—	—	—	—	—
2019–20	Grand Rapids Griffins	AHL	3	1	0	1	2	—	—	—	—	—
2020–21	Grand Rapids Griffins	AHL	14	0	4	4	8	—	—	—	—	—
2021–22	Utah Grizzlies	ECHL	52	26	31	57	87	18	19	11	30	44
2021–22	Colorado Eagles	AHL	6	1	0	1	14	—	—	—	—	—
2022–23	KooKoo	Liiga	56	7	16	23	63	7	2	1	3	29
2023–24	KooKoo	Liiga	54	17	29	46	42	—	—	—	—	—
2024–25	Brynäs IF	SHL	49	12	27	39	67	17	4	4	8	38
2025–26	Syracuse Crunch	AHL	4	1	2	3	0	—	—	—	—	—
2025–26	Tampa Bay Lightning	NHL	70	6	23	29	112	3	0	1	1	2
SHL totals			49	12	27	39	67	17	4	4	8	38
Liiga totals			110	24	45	69	105	7	2	1	3	29
NHL totals			70	6	23	29	112	3	0	1	1	2
