= Scott Sabourin =

Canadian ice hockey player (born 1992)

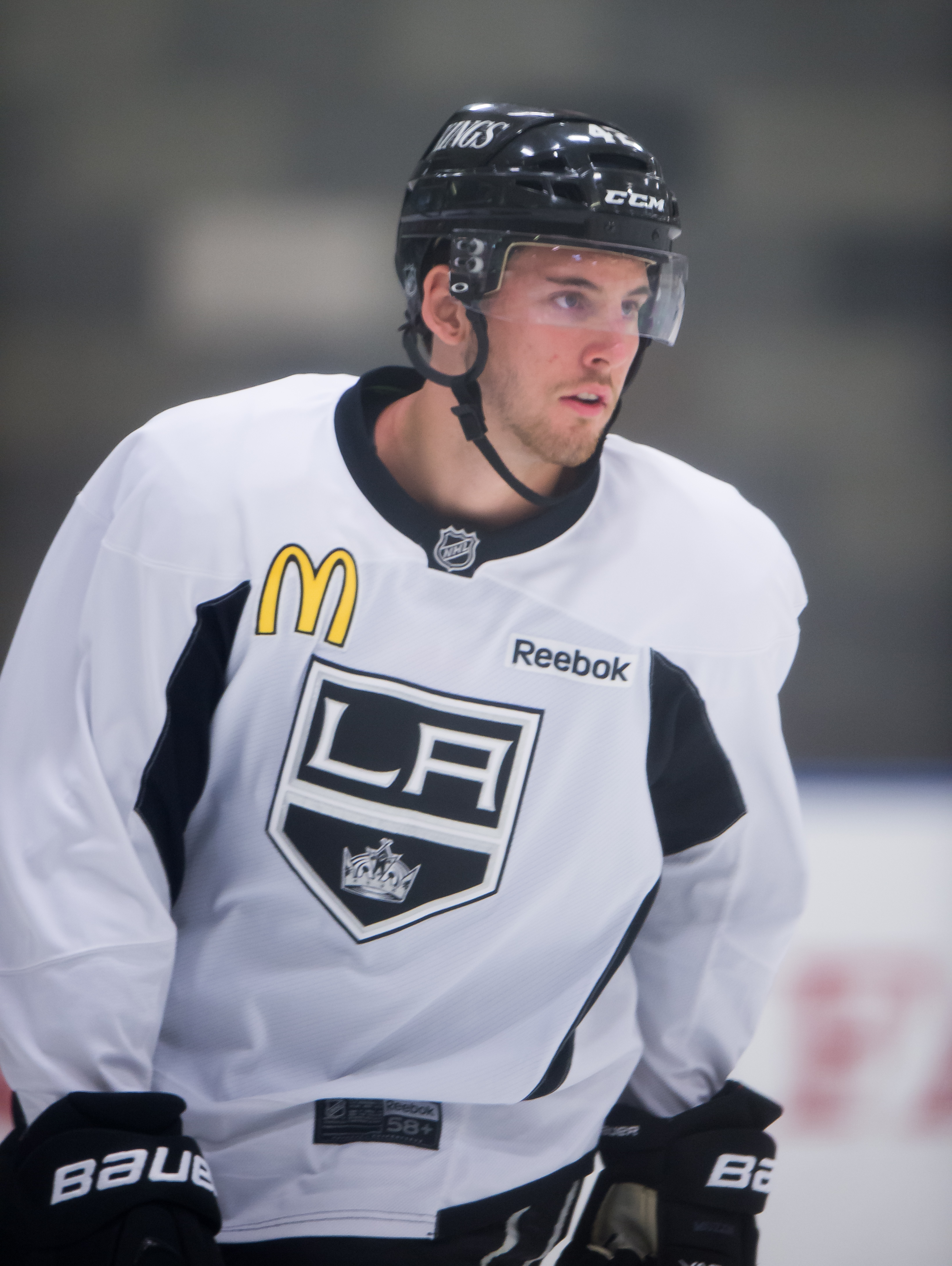
- Sabourin with the Los Angeles Kings in 2013
- Born: July 30, 1992 (age 34) Orleans, Ontario, Canada
- Height: 6 ft 2 in (188 cm)
- Weight: 213 lb (97 kg; 15 st 3 lb)
- Position: Forward
- Shoots: Right
- NHL team Former teams: Tampa Bay Lightning; Ottawa Senators; Toronto Maple Leafs; San Jose Sharks
- NHL draft: Undrafted
- Playing career: 2013–present

Scott Sabourin (born July 30, 1992) is a Canadian professional ice hockey player who is a forward for the Tampa Bay Lightning of the National Hockey League (NHL). He has also played in the NHL with the Ottawa Senators, Toronto Maple Leafs, and the San Jose Sharks.

== Playing career ==
Sabourin played four seasons (2009–2013) of major junior hockey with the Oshawa Generals in the Ontario Hockey League (OHL), scoring 46 goals and 34 assists for 80 points, while earning 330 penalty minutes, in 166 OHL games played.

Undrafted, on April 10, 2013, the Manchester Monarchs signed Sabourin to a two-year AHL contract, and he started his professional career at the tail-end of the 2012–13 AHL season by skating in five regular season and three playoff games with the Monarchs. On October 7, 2013, following an impressive pre-season training camp, Sabourin was signed by the Los Angeles Kings of the National Hockey League (NHL) to a three-year entry-level contract and he was assigned to play the 2013–14 season in the AHL with the Monarchs. During the 2015–16 season, on January 29, 2016, Sabourin was traded by the Kings to the Minnesota Wild in a trade deadline in exchange for center Brett Sutter.

As a free agent from the Wild in the following off-season, Sabourin signed to continue in the AHL, securing a one-year deal with the San Diego Gulls on September 8, 2016. On July 2, 2017, having impressed with the Gulls, Sabourin was retained by NHL affiliate, the Anaheim Ducks, on a one-year, two-way contract.

As a free agent from the Ducks, Sabourin was later invited to attend the Calgary Flames 2018 training camp. After his release from the Flames, he was later signed to begin the 2018–19 season on a professional try-out contract with AHL affiliate, the Stockton Heat, on October 5, 2018.

After attending the Ottawa Senators training camp on a professional tryout, Sabourin signed a one-year, two-way contract with the Senators on September 27, 2019. Sabourin, who grew up in the Ottawa suburb of Orléans, was coached by Senators coach D. J. Smith during his final year of junior hockey. In opening the 2019–20 season, Sabourin made his NHL debut against the Toronto Maple Leafs on October 2, 2019, scoring his first career NHL goal in a losing effort. Limited through injury, Sabourin played in 35 games with the Senators registering two goals and six points in a fourth-line role.

As a free agent at the conclusion of his contract with the Senators, Sabourin returned to the AHL in securing a one-year deal with the Toronto Marlies on October 16, 2020. Leading into the pandemic-delayed 2020–21 season, Sabourin was later signed to a one-year, two-way contract with the Marlies' NHL affiliate, the Toronto Maple Leafs, on February 6, 2021. He made one appearance with the Maple Leafs, appearing on the fourth line in a 3–2 overtime defeat to the Calgary Flames on April 13, 2021.

As a free agent from the Maple Leafs, Sabourin returned to former club the Ottawa Senators, in agreeing to a one-year, two-way contract on August 17, 2021. He spent the majority of the year with Ottawa's AHL affiliate, the Belleville Senators but managed to get into seven games with Ottawa registering two points. He re-signed with Ottawa to another one-year two-way deal on July 13, 2022. Sabourin played the entire 2022–23 season with Belleville, scoring a career high 16 goals and 33 points.

On July 1, 2023, Sabourin was signed as a free agent with the San Jose Sharks on a two-year, two-way contract. Sabourin attended the Sharks 2023 training camp, but did not make the team. He was placed on waivers and after going unclaimed, was assigned to the Sharks AHL affiliate, the San Jose Barracuda. He was recalled by the Sharks on January 8, 2024, and made his Sharks debut on January 9 versus the Toronto Maple Leafs. He was returned to the Barracuda on January 23 after appearing in three NHL games. After going unclaimed on waivers, he was assigned to the Barracuda for the 2024–25 season.

On July 13, 2025, Sabourin was signed by the Tampa Bay Lightning to a one-year, two-way contract for the 2025–26 season.

== Career statistics ==
			Regular season					Playoffs
Season	Team	League	GP	G	A	Pts	PIM	GP	G	A	Pts	PIM
2008–09	Brockville Braves	CJHL	57	9	8	17	64	9	1	2	3	4
2009–10	Kanata Stallions	CJHL	43	4	2	6	64	—	—	—	—	—
2009–10	Oshawa Generals	OHL	4	0	1	1	2	—	—	—	—	—
2010–11	Oshawa Generals	OHL	42	6	4	10	75	10	1	2	3	15
2011–12	Oshawa Generals	OHL	55	10	9	19	111	6	0	0	0	10
2012–13	Oshawa Generals	OHL	65	30	20	50	142	9	4	3	7	12
2012–13	Manchester Monarchs	AHL	5	0	1	1	4	3	0	0	0	7
2013–14	Manchester Monarchs	AHL	69	12	14	26	115	4	0	0	0	0
2014–15	Manchester Monarchs	AHL	51	5	6	11	138	—	—	—	—	—
2015–16	Ontario Reign	AHL	28	3	2	5	56	—	—	—	—	—
2015–16	Manchester Monarchs	ECHL	3	0	0	0	2	—	—	—	—	—
2015–16	Iowa Wild	AHL	14	1	1	2	34	—	—	—	—	—
2016–17	San Diego Gulls	AHL	54	8	9	17	147	8	0	0	0	10
2017–18	San Diego Gulls	AHL	44	4	3	7	80	—	—	—	—	—
2018–19	Stockton Heat	AHL	43	4	4	8	72	—	—	—	—	—
2019–20	Ottawa Senators	NHL	35	2	4	6	33	—	—	—	—	—
2020–21	Toronto Marlies	AHL	6	2	0	2	22	—	—	—	—	—
2020–21	Toronto Maple Leafs	NHL	1	0	0	0	5	—	—	—	—	—
2021–22	Ottawa Senators	NHL	7	0	2	2	11	—	—	—	—	—
2021–22	Belleville Senators	AHL	40	5	12	17	75	2	0	0	0	4
2022–23	Belleville Senators	AHL	51	16	17	33	177	—	—	—	—	—
2023–24	San Jose Barracuda	AHL	59	18	9	27	192	—	—	—	—	—
2023–24	San Jose Sharks	NHL	3	0	0	0	9	—	—	—	—	—
2024–25	San Jose Barracuda	AHL	68	10	15	25	111	6	0	0	0	10
2024–25	San Jose Sharks	NHL	1	0	0	0	0	—	—	—	—	—
2025–26	Syracuse Crunch	AHL	24	6	2	8	22	—	—	—	—	—
2025–26	Tampa Bay Lightning	NHL	26	1	4	5	89	2	0	0	0	2
NHL totals			73	3	10	13	147	2	0	0	0	2

== Awards and honours ==
Award	Year
AHL
Calder Cup champion	2015
