= Dominic James (ice hockey) =

American ice hockey player (born 2002)

- Born: July 3, 2002 (age 24) Plymouth, Michigan, U.S.
- Height: 6 ft 0 in (183 cm)
- Weight: 190 lb (86 kg; 13 st 8 lb)
- Position: Center
- Shoots: Left
- NHL team: Tampa Bay Lightning
- NHL draft: 173rd overall, 2022; Chicago Blackhawks
- Playing career: 2025–present

Dominic James (born July 3, 2002) is an American professional ice hockey player who is a center for the Tampa Bay Lightning of the National Hockey League (NHL). He was drafted 173rd overall by the Chicago Blackhawks in the 2022 NHL entry draft.

== Playing career ==
=== Junior ===
James played two full seasons in the United States Hockey League with the Lincoln Stars and recorded 14 goals and 34 assists during his tenure with the Stars.

He committed to play college ice hockey with the University of Minnesota Duluth and started his college career during the 2020–21 season. As a freshman he recorded six goals, 12 assists and 18 points.

That summer he was selected 173rd overall in the 2022 NHL entry draft by the Chicago Blackhawks. He was also named to the 2022 IIHF World Junior Championship that was ultimately canceled.

James was named an alternate captain for his junior season, but that season was prematurely ended for him due to a season-ending injury that required surgery. He was named captain entering his senior year with the Bulldogs. He finished his collegiate career with 30 goals and 77 points in 111 games.

=== Professional ===
On September 20, 2025, James signed a two-year entry-level contract with the Tampa Bay Lightning of the National Hockey League, after failing to reach an agreement with the Chicago Blackhawks. On October 23, 2025, he made his NHL debut with the Lightning at Benchmark International Arena. In his eighth career game on November 6, 2025, James tallied his first NHL goal and assists against the Vegas Golden Knights, finishing the night with three points.

== Career statistics ==
=== Regular season and playoffs ===
			Regular season					Playoffs
Season	Team	League	GP	G	A	Pts	PIM	GP	G	A	Pts	PIM
2018–19	Lincoln Stars	USHL	2	0	0	0	2	—	—	—	—	—
2019–20	Lincoln Stars	USHL	47	2	12	14	39	—	—	—	—	—
2020–21	Lincoln Stars	USHL	52	12	22	34	78	—	—	—	—	—
2021–22	University of Minnesota Duluth	NCHC	39	6	12	18	12	—	—	—	—	—
2022–23	University of Minnesota Duluth	NCHC	35	10	18	28	20	—	—	—	—	—
2023–24	University of Minnesota Duluth	NCHC	2	0	2	2	0	—	—	—	—	—
2024–25	University of Minnesota Duluth	NCHC	35	14	16	30	20	—	—	—	—	—
2025–26	Syracuse Crunch	AHL	4	3	2	5	0	—	—	—	—	—
2025–26	Tampa Bay Lightning	NHL	43	7	8	15	8	7	2	1	3	0
NHL totals			43	7	8	15	8	7	2	1	3	0

=== International ===
Year	Team	Event	Result	GP	G	A	Pts	PIM
2022	United States	WJC	5th	5	0	1	1	4
Junior totals				5	0	1	1	4
