= 2026–27 Vegas Golden Knights season =

National Hockey League season

2026–27 Vegas Golden Knights
- Division: Pacific
- Conference: Western
- 2026–27 record: 14–6–5
- Home record: 7–4–3
- Road record: 7–2–2
- Goals for: 85
- Goals against: 75

Team information
- General manager: Kelly McCrimmon
- Coach: Ryan Craig
- Captain: Mark Stone
- Alternate captains: Jack Eichel; William Karlsson; Alex Pietrangelo
- Arena: T-Mobile Arena
- Minor league affiliates: Henderson Silver Knights (AHL); Tahoe Knight Monsters (ECHL)

Team leaders
- Goals: Mark Stone (11)
- Assists: Mitch Marner (23)
- Points: Jack Eichel (31)
- Penalty minutes: Jérémy Lauzon (44)
- Plus/minus: Ivan Barbashev (+11)
- Wins: Carter Hart; Adin Hill (7)
- Goals against average: Adin Hill (2.61)

The 2026–27 Vegas Golden Knights season is the tenth season for the National Hockey League franchise that started playing in the 2017–18 season.

== Standings ==
=== Divisional standings ===
Pacific Division
Pos	Team	GP	W	L	OTL	RW	GF	GA	GD	Pts
1	Edmonton Oilers	25	17	5	3	14	97	72	+25	37
2	Vegas Golden Knights	25	14	6	5	11	85	75	+10	33
3	San Jose Sharks	25	11	12	2	4	69	89	−20	24
4	Anaheim Ducks	24	11	12	1	10	87	92	−5	23
5	Calgary Flames	24	10	12	2	9	60	84	−24	22
6	Seattle Kraken	20	10	9	1	7	67	71	−4	21
7	Los Angeles Kings	21	7	12	2	4	58	70	−12	16
8	Vancouver Canucks	25	6	18	1	3	71	108	−37	13

Updated to game(s) played on November 21, 2026. Source: National Hockey League
Rules for classification: 1) Fewer number of games played (GP, only during regular season); 2) Greater number of regulation wins (RW); 3) Greater number of wins in regulation and overtime, excluding shootout wins (ROW); 4) Greater number of total wins, including shootouts (W); 5) Greater number of points earned in head-to-head play; if teams played an uneven number of head-to-head games, the result of the first game on the home ice of the team with the extra home game is discarded; 6) Greater goal differential (GD); 7) Greater number of goals scored (GF)

=== Conference standings ===
Western Conference Wild Card
Pos	Div	Team	GP	W	L	OTL	RW	GF	GA	GD	Pts
1	CE	Nashville Predators	23	12	6	5	9	71	69	+2	29
2	CE	Utah Mammoth	24	12	9	3	10	80	81	−1	27
3	CE	St. Louis Blues	23	12	9	2	11	77	73	+4	26
4	CE	Winnipeg Jets	24	11	9	4	8	75	82	−7	26
5	PA	Anaheim Ducks	24	11	12	1	10	87	92	−5	23
6	PA	Calgary Flames	24	10	12	2	9	60	84	−24	22
7	PA	Seattle Kraken	20	10	9	1	7	67	71	−4	21
8	PA	Los Angeles Kings	21	7	12	2	4	58	70	−12	16
9	CE	Chicago Blackhawks	23	7	14	2	4	58	93	−35	16
10	PA	Vancouver Canucks	25	6	18	1	3	71	108	−37	13

Updated to game(s) played on November 21, 2026. Source: National Hockey League
Rules for classification: 1) Fewer number of games played (GP, only during regular season); 2) Greater number of regulation wins (RW); 3) Greater number of wins in regulation and overtime, excluding shootout wins (ROW); 4) Greater number of total wins, including shootouts (W); 5) Greater number of points earned in head-to-head play; if teams played an uneven number of head-to-head games, the result of the first game on the home ice of the team with the extra home game is discarded; 6) Greater goal differential (GD); 7) Greater number of goals scored (GF)

== Schedule and results ==
=== Preseason ===
The 2026 preseason schedule was published on June 22, 2026.

2026 preseason game log: 3–1–0 (home: 1–1–0; road: 2–0–0)
#	Date	Visitor	Score	Home	OT	Decision	Attendance	Record	Recap
1	September 19	Vegas	4–2	Los Angeles		Hill	8,233 (Note: Game played in Ontario, California at Toyota Arena, with the Kings as the designated home team.)	1–0–0
2	September 22	Vegas	2–1	San Jose	SO	Hart	11,573	2–0–0
3	September 24	Utah	4–5	Vegas	OT	Hill	14,809	3–0–0
4	September 26	San Jose	4–2	Vegas		Hart	17,264	3–1–0

=== Regular season ===
The regular season schedule was published on July 16, 2026.

2026–27 game log

September: 1–0–0 (home: 1–0–0; road: 0–0–0)
#	Date	Visitor	Score	Home	OT	Decision	Attendance	Record	Pts	Recap
1	September 29	Chicago	2–5	Vegas		Hart	17,838	1–0–0	2

October: 8–5–1 (home: 5–3–0; road: 3–2–1)
#	Date	Visitor	Score	Home	OT	Decision	Attendance	Record	Pts	Recap
2	October 2	Anaheim	4–3	Vegas		Hart	17,819	1–1–0	2
3	October 4	Vegas	3–2	Vancouver		Hill	17,227	2–1–0	4
4	October 6	Vegas	6–2	Seattle		Hart	17,151	3–1–0	6
5	October 8	Toronto	3–4	Vegas	SO	Hill	15,977	4–1–0	8
6	October 10	Los Angeles	1–2	Vegas	OT	Hart	16,768	5–1–0	10
7	October 12	Vegas	2–4	Minnesota		Hart	17,566	5–2–0	10
8	October 13	Vegas	5–2	Nashville		Hill	17,229	6–2–0	12
9	October 15	Calgary	2–6	Vegas		Hart	16,433	7–2–0	14
10	October 17	Pittsburgh	2–6	Vegas		Hill	17,437	8–2–0	16
11	October 20	Tampa Bay	6–2	Vegas		Hart	17,017	8–3–0	16
12	October 22	Vegas	2–6	St. Louis		Hill	18,096	8–4–0	16
13	October 24	Vegas	1–2	Columbus	OT	Hart	16,451	8–4–1	17
14	October 27	Ottawa	1–4	Vegas		Hill	16,663	9–4–1	19
15	October 30	New Jersey	5–2	Vegas		Hill	17,615	9–5–1	19

November: 5–1–4 (home: 1–1–3; road: 4–0–1)
#	Date	Visitor	Score	Home	OT	Decision	Attendance	Record	Pts	Recap
16	November 2	Vegas	2–3	Boston	SO	Hart	17,850	9–5–2	20
17	November 3	Vegas	3–2	Pittsburgh		Hill	15,740	10–5–2	22
18	November 5	Vegas	2–1	Detroit		Hart	19,515	11–5–2	24
19	November 8	Vegas	4–1	Buffalo		Hill	19,070	12–5–2	26
20	November 11	Utah	3–5	Vegas		Hart	17,186	13–5–2	28
21	November 13	Nashville	3–2	Vegas	SO	Hill	16,641	13–5–3	29
22	November 15	Vancouver	6–3	Vegas		Hart	16,336	13–6–3	29
23	November 17	Dallas	4–3	Vegas	OT	Hill	16,242	13–6–4	30
24	November 19	Dallas	4–3	Vegas	SO	Hill	16,238	13–6–5	31
25	November 21	Vegas	5–4	Winnipeg	SO	Hart	14,107	14–6–5	33
26	November 24	Vegas	–	Edmonton
27	November 27	Vegas	–	San Jose
28	November 28	Montreal	–	Vegas

December: 0–0–0 (home: 0–0–0; road: 0–0–0)
#	Date	Visitor	Score	Home	OT	Decision	Attendance	Record	Pts	Recap
29	December 1	Vegas	–	Los Angeles
30	December 3	Utah	–	Vegas
31	December 5	Winnipeg	–	Vegas
32	December 8	Vegas	–	Montreal
33	December 10	Vegas	–	Ottawa
34	December 12	Vegas	–	Toronto
35	December 16	San Jose	–	Vegas
36	December 18	NY Islanders	–	Vegas
37	December 21	Carolina	–	Vegas
38	December 22	Vegas	–	Anaheim
39	December 26	Vegas	–	San Jose
40	December 28	Vegas	–	Minnesota
41	December 29	Vegas	–	Chicago
42	December 31	St. Louis	–	Vegas

January: 0–0–0 (home: 0–0–0; road: 0–0–0)
#	Date	Visitor	Score	Home	OT	Decision	Attendance	Record	Pts	Recap
43	January 2	Colorado	–	Vegas
44	January 4	Vegas	–	Colorado
45	January 7	Minnesota	–	Vegas
46	January 9	Seattle	–	Vegas
47	January 12	Vegas	–	Washington
48	January 14	Vegas	–	Tampa Bay
49	January 16	Vegas	–	Florida
50	January 17	Vegas	–	Carolina
51	January 20	Edmonton	–	Vegas
52	January 22	Boston	–	Vegas
53	January 24	Vegas	–	Chicago
54	January 26	Vegas	–	Nashville
55	January 28	Buffalo	–	Vegas
56	January 30	Washington	–	Vegas

February: 0–0–0 (home: 0–0–0; road: 0–0–0)
#	Date	Visitor	Score	Home	OT	Decision	Attendance	Record	Pts	Recap
57	February 1	Vegas	–	Calgary
58	February 3	Vegas	–	Edmonton
59	February 13	Calgary	–	Vegas
60	February 15	Detroit	–	Vegas
61	February 18	Columbus	–	Vegas
62	February 20	Vegas	–	Dallas			(outdoors)
63	February 22	Vegas	–	Colorado
64	February 24	Florida	–	Vegas
65	February 26	Anaheim	–	Vegas

March: 0–0–0 (home: 0–0–0; road: 0–0–0)
#	Date	Visitor	Score	Home	OT	Decision	Attendance	Record	Pts	Recap
66	March 2	Vegas	–	Philadelphia
67	March 4	Vegas	–	NY Islanders
68	March 5	Vegas	–	New Jersey
69	March 7	Vegas	–	NY Rangers
70	March 9	San Jose	–	Vegas
71	March 11	Philadelphia	–	Vegas
72	March 13	NY Rangers	–	Vegas
73	March 15	Winnipeg	–	Vegas
74	March 17	Seattle	–	Vegas
75	March 20	Vegas	–	Anaheim
76	March 23	Vegas	–	Seattle
77	March 25	Vegas	–	Vancouver
78	March 27	Vegas	–	Calgary
79	March 31	Vancouver	–	Vegas

April: 0–0–0 (home: 0–0–0; road: 0–0–0)
#	Date	Visitor	Score	Home	OT	Decision	Attendance	Record	Pts	Recap
80	April 2	Edmonton	–	Vegas
81	April 3	Vegas	–	Utah
82	April 6	St. Louis	–	Vegas
83	April 8	Vegas	–	Los Angeles
84	April 10	Los Angeles	–	Vegas

Legend: Win (2 points) Loss (0 points) Overtime/shootout loss (1 point)

== Player statistics ==
Updated to games played November 21, 2026

=== Skaters ===
Regular season
Player	GP	G	A	Pts	+/−	PIM
Jack Eichel	25	9	22	31	–1	2
Mitch Marner	23	4	23	27	–3	8
Mark Stone	25	11	12	23	0	11
Tomáš Hertl	25	10	10	20	+5	6
Ivan Barbashev	25	5	12	17	+11	12
Trevor Connelly	25	7	9	16	+1	2
Victor Olofsson	12	8	4	12	+2	0
Brett Howden	25	8	4	12	–5	20
William Karlsson	25	6	5	11	–1	0
Braeden Bowman	25	5	4	9	–5	17
Brayden McNabb	25	0	9	9	+10	10
Rasmus Andersson	25	3	4	7	–10	20
Shea Theodore	25	2	5	7	+9	4
Noah Hanifin	19	2	4	6	+1	6
Raphaël Lavoie	13	1	2	3	+1	10
Jérémy Lauzon	25	1	2	3	0	44
Nic Dowd	25	0	3	3	–8	27
Marc Gatcomb	23	1	1	2	–6	11
Dylan Coghlan	17	0	2	2	+8	8
Ville Heinola	2	0	1	1	0	0
Alexander Holtz	2	0	1	1	–1	0
Parker Wotherspoon	12	0	1	1	–3	2
Jonas Røndbjerg	2	0	0	0	0	0

=== Goaltenders ===
Regular season
Player	GP	GS	TOI	W	L	OT	GA	GAA	SA	SV%	SO	G	A	PIM
Adin Hill	12	12	735:55	7	2	3	32	2.61	315	.898	0	0	0	0
Carter Hart	13	13	787:15	7	4	2	37	2.82	324	.886	0	0	0	2

^{†}Denotes player spent time with another team before joining the Golden Knights. Stats reflect time with the Golden Knights only.
^{‡}Denotes player was traded or waived mid-season. Stats reflect time with the Golden Knights only.
Bold denotes new franchise record.

== Roster ==
Updated November 12, 2026

No.	Nat	Player	Pos	S/G	Age	Acquired	Birthplace
4	(Sweden)	Rasmus Andersson	D	R	30	2026	Malmo, Sweden
49	(Russia)	Ivan Barbashev	C	L	30	2023	Moscow, Russia
42	(Canada)	Braeden Bowman	RW	R	23	2025	Kitchener, Ontario
52	(Canada)	Dylan Coghlan	D	R	28	2025	Duncan, British Columbia
24	(United States)	Trevor Connelly	LW	L	20	2024	Tustin, California
26	(United States)	Nic Dowd	C	R	36	2026	Huntsville, Alabama
9	(United States)	Jack Eichel (A)	C	R	30	2021	North Chelmsford, Massachusetts
17	(United States)	Marc Gatcomb	C	R	27	2026	Woburn, Massachusetts
15	(United States)	Noah Hanifin	D	L	29	2024	Boston, Massachusetts
79	(Canada)	Carter Hart	G	L	28	2025	Sherwood Park, Alberta
48	(Czech Republic)	Tomáš Hertl	C	L	33	2024	Prague, Czech Republic
33	(Canada)	Adin Hill	G	L	30	2022	Comox, British Columbia
21	(Canada)	Brett Howden	C	L	28	2021	Oakbank, Manitoba
71	(Sweden)	William Karlsson (A)	C	L	32	2017	Märsta, Sweden
5	(Canada)	Jérémy Lauzon	D	L	29	2025	Val-d'Or, Quebec
36	(Canada)	Raphaël Lavoie	C	R	26	2024	Chambly, Quebec
93	(Canada)	Mitch Marner	RW	R	29	2025	Markham, Ontario
3	(Canada)	Brayden McNabb	D	L	35	2017	Davidson, Saskatchewan
95	(Sweden)	Victor Olofsson	LW	L	31	2026	Örnsköldsvik, Sweden
61	(Canada)	Mark Stone (C)	RW	R	34	2019	Winnipeg, Manitoba
27	(Canada)	Shea Theodore	D	L	31	2017	Langley, British Columbia
29	(Canada)	Parker Wotherspoon	D	L	29	2026	Surrey, British Columbia

== Transactions ==
The Golden Knights have been involved in the following transactions during the 2026–27 season.

Key:

† Contract is entry-level.
‡ Contract initially takes effect in the 2027–28 season.

=== Trades ===
Date	Details		Ref
July 1, 2026	To Detroit Red Wings Keegan Kolesar	To Vegas Golden Knights 7th-round pick in 2027; 3rd-round pick in 2029	
November 16, 2026	To Minnesota Wild Jérémy Davies	To Vegas Golden Knights Future considerations (Note: Trade was completed when AHL forward Gerry Mayhew was traded from the Iowa Wild to the Henderson Silver Knights.)	

=== Players acquired ===
Date	Player	Former team	Term	Via	Ref
July 1, 2026	Marc Gatcomb	New York Islanders	2-year	Free agency	
July 1, 2026	Adam Ginning	Philadelphia Flyers	2-year	Free agency	
July 1, 2026	Ville Heinola	Winnipeg Jets	1-year	Free agency	
July 1, 2026	Victor Olofsson	Calgary Flames	1-year	Free agency	
July 1, 2026	Antti Tuomisto	Detroit Red Wings	2-year	Free agency	

=== Players lost ===
Date	Player	New team	Term	Via	Ref
July 1, 2026	Colton Sissons	Toronto Maple Leafs	2-year	Free agency	
July 1, 2026	Cole Smith	Chicago Blackhawks	3-year	Free agency	
November 5, 2026	Ben Hutton	New York Islanders	1-year	Free agency	

=== Signings ===
Date	Player	Term	Ref
July 1, 2026	Rasmus Andersson	7-year	
July 1, 2026	Dylan Coghlan	2-year	
July 1, 2026	Jakub Demek	1-year	
July 1, 2026	Joe Fleming	1-year	
July 1, 2026	Tanner Laczynski	3-year	
July 1, 2026	Jérémy Lauzon	6-year	
July 1, 2026	Raphaël Lavoie	1-year	
July 1, 2026	Jonas Røndbjerg	1-year	
July 6, 2026	Lukas Cormier	1-year	
July 15, 2026	Juho Piiparinen	3-year†	
September 10, 2026	Braeden Bowman	6-year‡	
September 12, 2026	Mark Stone	2-year‡	
September 30, 2026	William Karlsson	2-year‡	
Legend: † Contract is entry-level. ‡ Contract begins in 2027–28 season.

== Draft picks ==
Below are the Vegas Golden Knights' selections at the 2026 NHL Entry Draft, which was held on June 26 to 27, 2026, at the KeyBank Center in Buffalo.

Round	#	Player	Pos.	Nationality	Team (League)
1	29 (Note: The Colorado Avalanche's first-round pick went to the Golden Knights as the result of a trade on June 26, 2026 that sent a first-round pick in 2026 (28th overall) to Anaheim in exchange for a fourth-round pick in 2026 (117th overall) and this pick.)	Juho Piiparinen	D	Finland	Tappara (Liiga)
3	92 (Note: The Buffalo Sabres' third-round pick went to the Golden Knights as the result of a trade on June 26, 2026 that sent Pavel Dorofeyev to the New York Rangers in exchange for Dallas' first-round pick in 2026, a conditional first-round pick in 2028, and this pick.)	Ben Wilmott	C	United States	Barrie Colts (OHL)
3	95	Sean Burick	D	United States	Penticton Vees (WHL)
4	113 (Note: The Los Angeles Kings' fourth-round pick went to the Golden Knights as the result of a trade on June 27, 2026 that sent Philadelphia's fourth-round pick in 2026 and a seventh-round pick in 2026 to Montreal in exchange for this pick.)	Jonah Sivertson	RW	Canada	Prince Albert Raiders (WHL)
5	159	Will McLaughlin	D	Canada	Portland Winterhawks (WHL)
6	191	Matthew Minchak	G	United States	Kingston Frontenacs (OHL)
7	207 (Note: The Detroit Red Wings' seventh-round pick went to the Golden Knights as the result of a trade on June 27, 2026 that sent a seventh-round pick in 2027 to Detroit in exchange for this pick.)	Noel Pakarinen	LW	Finland	Kiekko-Espoo (U20 SM-sarja)
