= 2026–27 New York Islanders season =

National Hockey League season

2026–27 New York Islanders
- Division: Metropolitan
- Conference: Eastern
- 2026–27 record: 11–6–5
- Home record: 5–3–2
- Road record: 6–3–3
- Goals for: 71
- Goals against: 63

Team information
- General manager: Mathieu Darche
- Coach: Peter DeBoer
- Captain: Bo Horvat
- Alternate captains: Kyle Palmieri; Ryan Pulock; Matthew Schaefer; Brayden Schenn
- Arena: UBS Arena
- Minor league affiliates: Hamilton Hammers (AHL); Trenton Ironhawks (ECHL)

Team leaders
- Goals: Simon Holmström (10)
- Assists: Matthew Schaefer (17)
- Points: Matthew Schaefer (26)
- Penalty minutes: Logan Stanley; Brayden Schenn (34)
- Plus/minus: Ryan Pulock; Casey Cizikas (+7)
- Wins: Ilya Sorokin (9)
- Goals against average: Ilya Sorokin (2.39)

The 2026–27 New York Islanders season is the 55th season in the franchise's history. It is their sixth season in UBS Arena. On September 14, 2026, Bo Horvat was named the 16th captain in franchise history after Anders Lee opted to sign with the Utah Mammoth in the off-season.

== Standings ==
=== Divisional standings ===
Metropolitan Division
Pos	Team	GP	W	L	OTL	RW	GF	GA	GD	Pts
1	Carolina Hurricanes	22	16	3	3	15	88	49	+39	35
2	New Jersey Devils	22	15	7	0	10	82	64	+18	30
3	New York Rangers	22	13	8	1	13	67	58	+9	27
4	New York Islanders	21	10	6	5	8	68	61	+7	25
5	Philadelphia Flyers	25	8	11	6	7	63	85	−22	22
6	Washington Capitals	20	10	10	0	8	67	76	−9	20
7	Columbus Blue Jackets	20	8	12	0	3	50	65	−15	16
8	Pittsburgh Penguins	21	7	12	2	3	64	76	−12	16

Updated to game(s) played on November 19, 2026. Source: National Hockey League
Rules for classification: 1) Fewer number of games played (GP, only during regular season); 2) Greater number of regulation wins (RW); 3) Greater number of wins in regulation and overtime, excluding shootout wins (ROW); 4) Greater number of total wins, including shootouts (W); 5) Greater number of points earned in head-to-head play; if teams played an uneven number of head-to-head games, the result of the first game on the home ice of the team with the extra home game is discarded; 6) Greater goal differential (GD); 7) Greater number of goals scored (GF)

=== Conference standings ===
Eastern Conference Wild Card
Pos	Div	Team	GP	W	L	OTL	RW	GF	GA	GD	Pts
1	AT	Boston Bruins	22	14	7	1	11	76	56	+20	29
2	AT	Florida Panthers	23	12	8	3	10	72	68	+4	27
3	ME	New York Islanders	21	10	6	5	8	68	61	+7	25
4	AT	Buffalo Sabres	22	9	9	4	7	64	77	−13	22
5	ME	Philadelphia Flyers	25	8	11	6	7	63	85	−22	22
6	ME	Washington Capitals	20	10	10	0	8	67	76	−9	20
7	AT	Detroit Red Wings	22	8	11	3	6	58	68	−10	19
8	AT	Toronto Maple Leafs	24	8	13	3	7	75	86	−11	19
9	ME	Columbus Blue Jackets	20	8	12	0	3	50	65	−15	16
10	ME	Pittsburgh Penguins	21	7	12	2	3	64	76	−12	16

Updated to game(s) played on November 19, 2026. Source: National Hockey League
Rules for classification: 1) Fewer number of games played (GP, only during regular season); 2) Greater number of regulation wins (RW); 3) Greater number of wins in regulation and overtime, excluding shootout wins (ROW); 4) Greater number of total wins, including shootouts (W); 5) Greater number of points earned in head-to-head play; if teams played an uneven number of head-to-head games, the result of the first game on the home ice of the team with the extra home game is discarded; 6) Greater goal differential (GD); 7) Greater number of goals scored (GF)

== Schedule and results ==
=== Preseason ===
The New York Islanders preseason schedule was released on June 24, 2026.

2026 preseason game log: 1–3–0 (home: 0–2–0; road: 1–1–0)

#	Date	Visitor	Score	Home	OT	Decision	Location	Attendance	Record
1	September 20	NY Islanders	1–2	New Jersey		Vaněček	Prudential Center	10,226	0–1–0
2	September 22	NY Islanders	4–3	NY Rangers		Varlamov	Madison Square Garden	16,603	1–1–0
3	September 25	NY Rangers	6–1	NY Islanders		Varlamov	UBS Arena	14,034	1–2–0
4	September 26	New Jersey	4–1	NY Islanders		Sorokin	UBS Arena	9,777	1–3–0

Legend:

= Win = Loss = OT/SO Loss

=== Regular season ===
The regular season schedule was published on July 16, 2026.

2026–27 game log
September: 0–1–0 (home: 0–0–0; road: 0–1–0)

#	Date	Visitor	Score	Home	OT	Decision	Location	Attendance	Record	Points	Recap
1	September 30	NY Islanders	1–2	Toronto		Sorokin	Scotiabank Arena	18,801	0–1–0	0	

October: 7–4–2 (home: 4–2–1; road: 3–2–1)

#	Date	Visitor	Score	Home	OT	Decision	Location	Attendance	Record	Points	Recap
2	October 3	New Jersey	0–6	NY Islanders		Sorokin	UBS Arena	17,345	1–1–0	2	
3	October 6	NY Islanders	2–5	NY Rangers		Varlamov	Madison Square Garden	18,006	1–2–0	2	
4	October 8	Chicago	1–4	NY Islanders		Sorokin	UBS Arena	13,946	2–2–0	4	
5	October 10	Tampa Bay	5–3	NY Islanders		Sorokin	UBS Arena	17,345	2–3–0	4	
6	October 13	Vancouver	2–3	NY Islanders		Sorokin	UBS Arena	13,647	3–3–0	6	
7	October 15	NY Islanders	1–2	Ottawa	SO	Varlamov	Canadian Tire Centre	14,534	3–3–1	7	
8	October 17	NY Islanders	4–1	Toronto		Sorokin	Scotiabank Arena	18,915	4–3–1	9	
9	October 20	Anaheim	2–3	NY Islanders		Sorokin	UBS Arena	13,273	5–3–1	11	
10	October 22	Los Angeles	3–2	NY Islanders	OT	Varlamov	UBS Arena	14,397	5–3–2	12	
11	October 25	NY Islanders	3–6	Dallas		Sorokin	American Airlines Center	18,532	5–4–2	12	
12	October 27	NY Islanders	4–3	Nashville	SO	Varlamov	Bridgestone Arena	17,159	6–4–2	14	
13	October 29	NY Islanders	4–3	Minnesota	OT	Sorokin	Grand Casino Arena	18,155	7–4–2	16	
14	October 31	Edmonton	4–0	NY Islanders		Sorokin	UBS Arena	16,587	7–5–2	16	

November: 4–1–3 (home: 1–1–1; road: 3–0–2)

#	Date	Visitor	Score	Home	OT	Decision	Location	Attendance	Record	Points	Recap
15	November 5	Carolina	5–3	NY Islanders		Varlamov	UBS Arena	14,234	7–6–2	16	
16	November 7	New Jersey	5–4	NY Islanders	OT	Sorokin	UBS Arena	17,345	7–6–3	17	
17	November 9	NY Islanders	2–3	San Jose	SO	Sorokin	SAP Center	13,769	7–6–4	18	
18	November 12	NY Islanders	5–2	Los Angeles		Sorokin	Crypto.com Arena	15,622	8–6–4	20	
19	November 14	NY Islanders	6–2	Anaheim		Varlamov	Honda Center	16,184	9–6–4	22	
20	November 17	Columbus	1–5	NY Islanders		Sorokin	UBS Arena	14,295	10–6–4	24	
21	November 19	NY Islanders	3–4	Winnipeg	OT	Varlamov	Canada Life Centre	13,161	10–6–5	25	
22	November 21	NY Islanders	3–2	Detroit		Sorokin	Little Caesars Arena	19,515	11–6–5	27	
23	November 23	Toronto	–	NY Islanders			UBS Arena				
24	November 25	St. Louis	–	NY Islanders			UBS Arena				
25	November 27	Winnipeg	–	NY Islanders			UBS Arena				
26	November 28	NY Islanders	–	Philadelphia			Xfinity Mobile Arena				

December: 0–0–0 (home: 0–0–0; road: 0–0–0)

#	Date	Visitor	Score	Home	OT	Decision	Location	Attendance	Record	Points	Recap
27	December 1	Florida	–	NY Islanders			UBS Arena				
28	December 3	NY Islanders	–	Philadelphia			Xfinity Mobile Arena				
29	December 4	San Jose	–	NY Islanders			UBS Arena				
30	December 7	Colorado	–	NY Islanders			UBS Arena				
31	December 10	Calgary	–	NY Islanders			UBS Arena				
32	December 11	NY Islanders	–	Carolina			Lenovo Center				
33	December 15	NY Islanders	–	Utah			Delta Center				
34	December 16	NY Islanders	–	Colorado			Ball Arena				
35	December 18	NY Islanders	–	Vegas			T-Mobile Arena				
36	December 20	NY Rangers	–	NY Islanders			UBS Arena				
37	December 22	Boston	–	NY Islanders			UBS Arena				
38	December 26	NY Islanders	–	Boston			TD Garden				
39	December 27	Ottawa	–	NY Islanders			UBS Arena				
40	December 30	Washington	–	NY Islanders			UBS Arena				

January: 0–0–0 (home: 0–0–0; road: 0–0–0)

#	Date	Visitor	Score	Home	OT	Decision	Location	Attendance	Record	Points	Recap
41	January 2	NY Islanders	–	Seattle			Climate Pledge Arena				
42	January 5	NY Islanders	–	Vancouver			Rogers Arena				
43	January 7	NY Islanders	–	Calgary			Scotiabank Saddledome				
44	January 9	NY Islanders	–	Edmonton			Rogers Place				
45	January 13	Pittsburgh	–	NY Islanders			UBS Arena				
46	January 15	Dallas	–	NY Islanders			UBS Arena				
47	January 16	NY Islanders	–	New Jersey			Prudential Center				
48	January 18	Nashville	–	NY Islanders			UBS Arena				
49	January 20	Buffalo	–	NY Islanders			UBS Arena				
50	January 22	NY Islanders	–	Washington			Capital One Arena				
51	January 23	Seattle	–	NY Islanders			UBS Arena				
52	January 26	NY Islanders	–	Pittsburgh			PPG Paints Arena				
53	January 28	NY Islanders	–	Carolina			Lenovo Center				
54	January 30	NY Islanders	–	Tampa Bay			Benchmark International Arena				

February: 0–0–0 (home: 0–0–0; road: 0–0–0)

#	Date	Visitor	Score	Home	OT	Decision	Location	Attendance	Record	Points	Recap
55	February 1	NY Islanders	–	Florida			Amerant Bank Arena				
56	February 3	NY Islanders	–	Buffalo			KeyBank Center				
57	February 12	NY Islanders	–	NY Rangers			Madison Square Garden				
58	February 13	Minnesota	–	NY Islanders			UBS Arena				
59	February 15	Utah	–	NY Islanders			UBS Arena				
60	February 18	NY Rangers	–	NY Islanders			UBS Arena				
61	February 20	NY Islanders	–	Montreal			Bell Centre				
62	February 22	NY Islanders	–	Columbus			Nationwide Arena				
63	February 23	NY Islanders	–	Chicago			United Center				
64	February 26	Philadelphia	–	NY Islanders			UBS Arena				
65	February 27	NY Islanders	–	Columbus			Nationwide Arena				

March: 0–0–0 (home: 0–0–0; road: 0–0–0)

#	Date	Visitor	Score	Home	OT	Decision	Location	Attendance	Record	Points	Recap
66	March 1	Washington	–	NY Islanders			UBS Arena				
67	March 4	Vegas	–	NY Islanders			UBS Arena				
68	March 7	Pittsburgh	–	NY Islanders			UBS Arena				
69	March 9	Montreal	–	NY Islanders			UBS Arena				
70	March 12	NY Islanders	–	Florida			Amerant Bank Arena				
71	March 13	NY Islanders	–	Tampa Bay			Benchmark International Arena				
72	March 15	NY Islanders	–	Boston			TD Garden				
73	March 17	NY Islanders	–	Washington			Capital One Arena				
74	March 20	Philadelphia	–	NY Islanders			UBS Arena				
75	March 21	Buffalo	–	NY Islanders			UBS Arena				
76	March 25	NY Islanders	–	St. Louis			Enterprise Center				
77	March 27	Detroit	–	NY Islanders			UBS Arena				
78	March 30	Carolina	–	NY Islanders			UBS Arena				

April: 0–0–0 (home: 0–0–0; road: 0–0–0)

#	Date	Visitor	Score	Home	OT	Decision	Location	Attendance	Record	Points	Recap
79	April 1	NY Islanders	–	Pittsburgh			PPG Paints Arena				
80	April 2	Ottawa	–	NY Islanders			UBS Arena				
81	April 4	Montreal	–	NY Islanders			UBS Arena				
82	April 6	Detroit	–	NY Islanders			UBS Arena				
83	April 8	NY Islanders	–	New Jersey			Prudential Center				
84	April 10	Columbus	–	NY Islanders			UBS Arena				

Legend: Win (2 points) Loss (0 points) OT/SO loss (1 point)

== Roster ==
Updated November 18, 2026

No.	Nat	Player	Pos	S/G	Age	Acquired	Birthplace
13	(Canada)	Mathew Barzal	C	R	29	2015	Coquitlam, British Columbia
26	(United States)	Mitchell Chaffee	RW	R	28	2026	Grand Rapids, Michigan
53	(Canada)	Casey Cizikas	C	L	35	2009	Toronto, Ontario
77	(United States)	Tony DeAngelo	D	R	31	2025	Sewell, New Jersey
11	(Canada)	Anthony Duclair	LW	L	31	2024	Pointe-Claire, Quebec
38	(Sweden)	Victor Eklund	RW	R	20	2025	Stockholm, Sweden
51	(Sweden)	Emil Heineman	LW	L	25	2025	Leksand, Sweden
92	(Sweden)	Simon Holmström	RW	L	25	2019	Tranås, Sweden
14	(Canada)	Bo Horvat (C)	C	L	31	2023	Rodney, Ontario
71	(Canada)	Ben Hutton	D	L	33	2026	Brockville, Ontario
4	(United States)	Matthew Kessel	D	R	26	2026	Bloomfield Hills, Michigan
63	(Finland)	Matias Maccelli	LW	L	26	2026	Turku, Finland
24	(United States)	Scott Mayfield	D	R	34	2011	St. Louis, Missouri
44	(Canada)	Jean-Gabriel Pageau	C	R	34	2020	Ottawa, Ontario
81	(Czech Republic)	Ondřej Palát	LW	L	35	2026	Frýdek-Místek, Czechoslovakia
21	(United States)	Kyle Palmieri (A)	RW	R	35	2021	Smithtown, New York
3	(Canada)	Adam Pelech	D	L	32	2012	Toronto, Ontario
6	(Canada)	Ryan Pulock (A)	D	R	32	2013	Grandview, Manitoba
28	(Russia)	Alexander Romanov	D	L	26	2022	Moscow, Russia
48	(Canada)	Matthew Schaefer (A)	D	L	19	2025	Hamilton, Ontario
10	(Canada)	Brayden Schenn (A)	C	L	35	2026	Saskatoon, Saskatchewan
30	(Russia)	Ilya Sorokin	G	L	31	2014	Mezhdurechensk, Russia
8	(Canada)	Logan Stanley	D	L	28	2026	Kitchener, Ontario
40	(Russia)	Semyon Varlamov	G	L	38	2019	Kuybyshev, Soviet Union

== Player statistics ==
=== Skaters ===
Regular season
Player	GP	G	A	Pts	+/−	PIM
Matthew Schaefer	22	9	17	26	0	14
Bo Horvat	22	9	12	21	3	6
Simon Holmström	22	10	8	18	5	2
Brayden Schenn	22	6	10	16	-1	34
Victor Eklund	22	7	4	11	5	10
Matias Maccelli	13	2	9	11	4	2
Anthony Duclair	22	6	3	9	-9	22
Kyle Palmieri	22	4	5	9	2	8
Emil Heineman	22	3	6	9	5	19
Tony DeAngelo	22	2	6	8	-7	9
Jean-Gabriel Pageau	19	1	7	8	-2	2
Ondřej Palát	22	4	3	7	-2	8
Casey Cizikas	22	1	4	5	7	4
Logan Stanley	20	0	5	5	4	34
Ryan Pulock	17	0	4	4	7	2
Ben Hutton	7	2	1	3	5	0
Mitchell Chaffee	12	2	1	3	-1	14
Adam Pelech	22	1	2	3	2	25
Mathew Barzal	4	0	3	3	1	0
Calum Ritchie	8	1	1	2	0	2
Matthew Kessel	15	0	2	2	4	6
Alexander Romanov	3	0	0	0	2	0
Scott Mayfield	6	0	0	0	2	12
Kyle MacLean	8	0	0	0	-1	17

=== Goaltenders ===
Regular season
Player	GP	GS	TOI	W	L	OT	GA	GAA	SA	SV%	SO	G	A	PIM
Ilya Sorokin	15	15	903:20	9	4	2	36	2.39	439	.918	1	0	0	0
Semyon Varlamov	7	7	429:48	2	2	3	20	2.79	180	.889	0	0	0	0

- ^{†} Denotes player spent time with another team before joining the Islanders. Stats reflect time with the Islanders only.
- ^{‡} Denotes player was traded mid-season. Stats reflect time with the Islanders only.
- Bold/italics denotes franchise record.

== Awards and honors ==
=== Awards ===
Regular season
Player	Award	Date

=== Milestones ===
Regular season
Player	Milestone	Date
Victor Eklund	1st NHL Goal	October 3, 2026
Matias Maccelli	300th NHL Game	October 11, 2026
Matthew Kessel	100th NHL Game	October 13, 2026
Brayden Schenn	300th NHL Goal	October 27, 2026
Matthew Schaefer	100th NHL Game	November 12, 2026
Tony DeAngelo	500th NHL Game	November 12, 2026
Bo Horvat	900th NHL Game	November 14, 2026
Simon Holmström	300th NHL Game	November 19, 2026
Casey Cizikas	1000th NHL Game	November 21, 2026

=== Records ===
Regular season
Player	Milestone	Date

== Transactions ==
The Islanders have been involved in the following transactions during the 2026–27 season.

'Key:

† Contract is entry-level.
‡ Contract initially takes effect in the 2027–28 season.

=== Trade ===
Date	Details	Ref

=== Free agents ===
Date	Player	Team	Contract term	Ref
July 1, 2026	Vítek Vaněček	from Utah Mammoth	1-year	
July 1, 2026	Matias Maccelli	from Toronto Maple Leafs	1-year	
July 1, 2026	Matthew Kessel	from St. Louis Blues	1-year	
July 1, 2026	Adam Beckman	to Colorado Avalanche	2-year	
July 1, 2026	Mitchell Chaffee	from Tampa Bay Lightning	1-year	
July 1, 2026	Anders Lee	to Utah Mammoth	3-year	
July 1, 2026	Travis Mitchell	to Anaheim Ducks	1-year	
July 1, 2026	Marc Gatcomb	to Vegas Golden Knights	2-year	
July 2, 2026	Cole McWard	to Toronto Maple Leafs	2-year	
July 2, 2026	Maxim Shabanov	to Minnesota Wild	1-year	
July 2, 2026	David Rittich	to New Jersey Devils	1-year	
September 27, 2026	Logan Stanley	from Buffalo Sabres	1-year	
September 29, 2026	Carson Soucy	to Columbus Blue Jackets	1-year	
October 11, 2026	Adam Boqvist	to Geneve-Servette	1-year	
November 5, 2026	Ben Hutton	from Vegas Golden Knights	1-year	

=== Waivers ===
Date	Player	Team	Ref

=== Contract terminations ===
Date	Player	Via	Ref

=== Retirement ===
Date	Player	Ref

=== Signings ===
Date	Player	Contract term	Ref
July 1, 2026	Matt Luff	1-year	
July 14, 2026	Malte Gustafsson	3-year†	
July 17, 2026	Henrik Tikkanen	1-year	
July 22, 2026	Joey Larson	2-year	
July 29, 2026	Alex Jefferies	1-year	

==== Key ====
† Contract is entry-level.

‡ Contract takes effect in the 2027–28 season.

== Draft picks ==
Below are the New York Islanders' selections at the 2026 NHL entry draft, which was held on June 26 and 27, 2026, at KeyBank Center in Buffalo, New York.

Round	#	Player	Pos	Nationality	College/junior/club team
1	13	Malte Gustafsson	D	Sweden	HV71 (SHL)
4	109	Lincoln Kuehne	D	United States	Arizona State (NCHC)
5	141	Vladimír Dravecký	D	Czech Republic	Brantford Bulldogs (OHL)
6	173	Artyon Matyuk	C	Russia	Chaika Nizhny Novgorod (MHL)
7	205	Bobby Cowan	RW	United States	Western Michigan Broncos (NCHC)
