= Tyrel Bauer =

Canadian ice hockey player (born 2002)

- Born: 23 March 2002 (age 24) Cochrane, Alberta, Canada
- Height: 6 ft 3 in (191 cm)
- Weight: 207 lb (94 kg; 14 st 11 lb)
- Position: Defence
- Shoots: Right
- NHL team: Winnipeg Jets
- NHL draft: 164th overall, 2020; Winnipeg Jets
- Playing career: 2022–present

Tyrel Bauer (born 23 March 2002) is a Canadian professional ice hockey defenceman who currently plays for the Winnipeg Jets in the National Hockey League (NHL). He was selected by the Jets in the sixth round, 164th overall, in the 2020 NHL entry draft. Bauer is known for his ability as a fighter, logging 45 fights in his four year AHL career.

== Playing career ==
Bauer grew up playing hockey in Cochrane, Alberta before playing junior hockey in the Western Hockey League for the Seattle Thunderbirds. In Seattle, he was a captain for three of his four years with the team.

After being drafted in the sixth round by the Winnipeg Jets, Bauer played in 214 AHL games for the Manitoba Moose, posting 21 points (5G, 16A) and 401 penalty minutes. During this time he was recognized by the Moose with the Richard Bue Ultimate Teammate Award in both 2025 and 2026, the Julian Klymkiw Community Service Award in both 2025 and 2026, and Fan Favourite Award in 2026.

Bauer made the Jets lineup to begin the 2026–27 NHL season. In his first two games in the NHL, Bauer got into two fights, winning them both. Later, on November 3rd, 2026- Bauer- while playing as a forward- scored his first NHL goal, as well as his first NHL assist, and got into another fight- giving him his first NHL Gordie Howe hat trick. Arber Xhekaj did however drop him.

== Career statistics ==
			Regular season					Playoffs
Season	Team	League	GP	G	A	Pts	PIM	GP	G	A	Pts	PIM
2015–16	Airdrie Xtreme	AMBHL	36	0	4	4	42	—	—	—	—	—
2016–17	Airdrie Xtreme	AMBHL	36	3	14	17	40	2	1	1	2	0
2017–18	Airdrie CFR Bisons	AMHL	32	3	8	11	101	—	—	—	—	—
2017–18	Seattle Thunderbirds	WHL	2	0	0	0	0	—	—	—	—	—
2018–19	Seattle Thunderbirds	WHL	64	2	12	14	91	6	0	1	1	2
2019–20	Seattle Thunderbirds	WHL	60	3	14	17	85	—	—	—	—	—
2020–21	Seattle Thunderbirds	WHL	23	2	5	7	21	—	—	—	—	—
2021–22	Seattle Thunderbirds	WHL	32	5	5	10	59	23	0	5	5	23
2022–23	Manitoba Moose	AHL	47	2	5	7	103	—	—	—	—	—
2023–24	Manitoba Moose	AHL	56	2	5	7	83	1	0	0	0	0
2024–25	Manitoba Moose	AHL	59	0	2	2	105	—	—	—	—	—
2025–26	Manitoba Moose	AHL	52	1	4	5	110	7	0	0	0	6
AHL totals			214	5	16	21	401	8	0	0	0	6
