= 2026–27 Toronto Maple Leafs season =

National Hockey League team season

2026–27 Toronto Maple Leafs
- Division: Atlantic
- Conference: Eastern
- 2026–27 record: 8–13–3
- Home record: 4–9–2
- Road record: 4–4–1
- Goals for: 75
- Goals against: 86

Team information
- General manager: John Chayka
- Coach: Jim Hiller
- Captain: Auston Matthews
- Alternate captains: Morgan Rielly; John Tavares
- Arena: Scotiabank Arena
- Minor league affiliates: Toronto Marlies (AHL); Cincinnati Cyclones (ECHL)

Team leaders
- Goals: Auston Matthews (12)
- Assists: Auston Matthews (17)
- Points: Auston Matthews (29)
- Penalty minutes: Zack MacEwen (26)
- Plus/minus: Auston Matthews (+8)
- Wins: Anthony Stolarz (5)
- Goals against average: Anthony Stolarz (2.69)

The 2026–27 Toronto Maple Leafs season is the franchise's 110th season (109th season of play) in the National Hockey League (NHL).

== Standings ==
=== Divisional standings ===
Atlantic Division
Pos	Team	GP	W	L	OTL	RW	GF	GA	GD	Pts
1	Tampa Bay Lightning	21	14	5	2	12	79	61	+18	30
2	Ottawa Senators	22	14	6	2	11	70	62	+8	30
3	Montreal Canadiens	22	13	5	4	9	72	66	+6	30
4	Boston Bruins	22	14	7	1	11	76	56	+20	29
5	Florida Panthers	23	12	8	3	10	72	68	+4	27
6	Buffalo Sabres	21	8	9	4	6	58	74	−16	20
7	Detroit Red Wings	22	8	11	3	6	58	68	−10	19
8	Toronto Maple Leafs	23	8	13	2	7	72	82	−10	18

Updated to game(s) played on November 18, 2026. Source: National Hockey League
Rules for classification: 1) Fewer number of games played (GP, only during regular season); 2) Greater number of regulation wins (RW); 3) Greater number of wins in regulation and overtime, excluding shootout wins (ROW); 4) Greater number of total wins, including shootouts (W); 5) Greater number of points earned in head-to-head play; if teams played an uneven number of head-to-head games, the result of the first game on the home ice of the team with the extra home game is discarded; 6) Greater goal differential (GD); 7) Greater number of goals scored (GF)

=== Conference standings ===
Eastern Conference Wild Card
Pos	Div	Team	GP	W	L	OTL	RW	GF	GA	GD	Pts
1	AT	Boston Bruins	22	14	7	1	11	76	56	+20	29
2	AT	Florida Panthers	23	12	8	3	10	72	68	+4	27
3	ME	New York Islanders	20	10	6	4	8	65	57	+8	24
4	ME	Washington Capitals	19	10	9	0	8	64	70	−6	20
5	AT	Buffalo Sabres	21	8	9	4	6	58	74	−16	20
6	ME	Philadelphia Flyers	24	7	11	6	7	57	80	−23	20
7	AT	Detroit Red Wings	22	8	11	3	6	58	68	−10	19
8	AT	Toronto Maple Leafs	23	8	13	2	7	72	82	−10	18
9	ME	Pittsburgh Penguins	20	7	11	2	3	62	71	−9	16
10	ME	Columbus Blue Jackets	19	7	12	0	2	46	63	−17	14

Updated to game(s) played on November 18, 2026. Source: National Hockey League
Rules for classification: 1) Fewer number of games played (GP, only during regular season); 2) Greater number of regulation wins (RW); 3) Greater number of wins in regulation and overtime, excluding shootout wins (ROW); 4) Greater number of total wins, including shootouts (W); 5) Greater number of points earned in head-to-head play; if teams played an uneven number of head-to-head games, the result of the first game on the home ice of the team with the extra home game is discarded; 6) Greater goal differential (GD); 7) Greater number of goals scored (GF)

== Schedule and results ==
=== Preseason ===
2026 preseason game log: 2–1–1 (Home: 1–1–0; Road: 1–0–1)
#	Date	Visitor	Score	Home	OT	Decision	Location	Attendance	Record	Recap
1	September 19^{A}	Montreal	4–1	Toronto		Stolarz (0–1–0)	Scotiabank Arena	16,267	0–1–0
2	September 19^{A}	Toronto	3–4	Montreal	OT	Hlavaj (0–0–1)	Bell Centre	20,962	0–1–1
3	September 23^{A}	Ottawa	1–6	Toronto		Bobrovsky (1–0–0)	Scotiabank Arena	17,996	1–1–1
4	September 23^{A}	Toronto	4–2	Ottawa		Stolarz (1–1–0)	Canadian Tire Centre	11,785	2–1–1
Notes:^{A} Split-squad games.

=== Regular season ===
2026–27 Game Log: 8–13–3, 19 points (home: 4–9–2; road: 4–4–1)

September: 1–1–0, 2 points (Home: 1–1–0; Road: 0–0–0)
#	Date	Visitor	Score	Home	OT	Decision	Attendance	Record	Pts	Recap
1	September 29	Montreal	3–2	Toronto		Bobrovsky (0–1–0)	19,088	0–1–0	0
2	September 30	NY Islanders	1–2	Toronto		Stolarz (1–0–0)	18,801	1–1–0	2

October: 7–5–2, 16 points (Home: 3–2–1; Road: 4–3–1)
#	Date	Visitor	Score	Home	OT	Decision	Attendance	Record	Pts	Recap
3	October 3	Ottawa	3–2	Toronto		Bobrovsky (0–2–0)	18,434	1–2–0	2
4	October 6	Nashville	4–5	Toronto	OT	Stolarz (2–0–0)	18,792	2–2–0	4
5	October 8	Toronto	3–4	Vegas	SO	Bobrovsky (0–2–1)	15,977	2–2–1	5
6	October 10	Toronto	6–3	Colorado		Bobrovsky (1–2–1)	18,091	3–2–1	7
7	October 13	Toronto	4–5	Utah		Stolarz (2–1–0)	14,111	3–3–1	7
8	October 15	Buffalo	5–4	Toronto	OT	Bobrovsky (1–2–2)	18,886	3–3–2	8
9	October 17	NY Islanders	4–1	Toronto		Bobrovsky (1–3–2)	18,915	3–4–2	8
10	October 19	San Jose	1–3	Toronto		Bobrovsky (2–3–2)	19,011	4–4–2	10
11	October 20	Toronto	6–2	Columbus		Stolarz (3–1–0)	15,073	5–4–2	12
12	October 22	NY Rangers	4–5	Toronto		Bobrovsky (3–3–2)	18,872	6–4–2	14
13	October 24	Toronto	7–2	Edmonton		Stolarz (4–1–0)	18,347	7–4–2	16
14	October 26	Toronto	2–5	Calgary		Bobrovsky (3–4–2)	18,476	7–5–2	16
15	October 28	Toronto	4–5	Seattle		Bobrovsky (3–5–2)	17,151	7–6–2	16
16	October 31	Toronto	4–2	Vancouver		Stolarz (5–1–0)	17,867	8–6–2	18

November: 0–7–1, 1 points (Home: 0–6–1; Road: 0–1–0)
#	Date	Visitor	Score	Home	OT	Decision	Attendance	Record	Pts	Recap
17	November 3	Utah	3–2	Toronto		Bobrovsky (3–6–2)	18,889	8–7–2	18
18	November 7	Montreal	4–2	Toronto		Bobrovsky (3–7–2)	19,253	8–8–2	18
19	November 8	New Jersey	4–0	Toronto		Stolarz (5–2–0)	18,811	8–9–2	18
20	November 10	Colorado	6–3	Toronto		Bobrovsky (3–8–2)	18,853	8–10–2	18
21	November 12	Minnesota	5–2	Toronto		Stolarz (5–3–0)	18,397	8–11–2	18
22	November 14	Edmonton	1–0	Toronto		Stolarz (5–4–0)	19,002	8–12–2	18
23	November 17	Toronto	3–6	Chicago		Bobrovsky (3–9–2)	19,998	8–13–2	18
24	November 19	Los Angeles	4–3	Toronto	OT	Stolarz (5–4–1)	18,641	8–13–3	19
25	November 21	Columbus	–	Toronto				0–0–0
26	November 23	Toronto	–	NY Islanders				0–0–0
27	November 27	Toronto	–	Boston				0–0–0
28	November 28	Toronto	–	Pittsburgh				0–0–0
29	November 30	Philadelphia	–	Toronto				0–0–0

December: 0–0–0, 0 points (Home: 0–0–0; Road: 0–0–0)
#	Date	Visitor	Score	Home	OT	Decision	Attendance	Record	Pts	Recap
30	December 3	Florida	–	Toronto				0–0–0
31	December 5	Toronto	–	Carolina				0–0–0
32	December 9	Toronto	–	Dallas				0–0–0
33	December 12	Vegas	–	Toronto				0–0–0
34	December 13	Anaheim	–	Toronto				0–0–0
35	December 15	Toronto	–	Minnesota				0–0–0
36	December 17	Toronto	–	New Jersey				0–0–0
37	December 19	Tampa Bay	–	Toronto				0–0–0
38	December 21	Washington	–	Toronto				0–0–0
39	December 22	Toronto	–	Detroit				0–0–0
40	December 26	Toronto	–	Montreal				0–0–0
41	December 29	Toronto	–	Anaheim				0–0–0
42	December 30	Toronto	–	Los Angeles				0–0–0

January: 0–0–0, 0 points (Home: 0–0–0; Road: 0–0–0)
#	Date	Visitor	Score	Home	OT	Decision	Attendance	Record	Pts	Recap
43	January 2	Toronto	–	San Jose				0–0–0
44	January 4	Toronto	–	Washington				0–0–0
45	January 7	Toronto	–	Philadelphia				0–0–0
46	January 9	Philadelphia	–	Toronto				0–0–0
47	January 11	Winnipeg	–	Toronto				0–0–0
48	January 14	Chicago	–	Toronto				0–0–0
49	January 16	Pittsburgh	–	Toronto				0–0–0
50	January 18	St. Louis	–	Toronto				0–0–0
51	January 20	Toronto	–	Ottawa				0–0–0
52	January 23	Toronto	–	St. Louis				0–0–0
53	January 26	Calgary	–	Toronto				0–0–0
54	January 27	Toronto	–	Detroit				0–0–0
55	January 30	Toronto	–	Boston				0–0–0

February: 0–0–0, 0 points (Home: 0–0–0; Road: 0–0–0)
#	Date	Visitor	Score	Home	OT	Decision	Attendance	Record	Pts	Recap
56	February 8	Columbus	–	Toronto				0–0–0
57	February 10	Boston	–	Toronto				0–0–0
58	February 13	Toronto	–	Ottawa				0–0–0
59	February 16	Carolina	–	Toronto				0–0–0
60	February 18	Toronto	–	Nashville				0–0–0
61	February 20	Toronto	–	Tampa Bay				0–0–0
62	February 23	Detroit	–	Toronto				0–0–0
63	February 25	Toronto	–	Pittsburgh				0–0–0
64	February 27	Toronto	–	Buffalo				0–0–0

March: 0–0–0, 0 points (Home: 0–0–0; Road: 0–0–0)
#	Date	Visitor	Score	Home	OT	Decision	Attendance	Record	Pts	Recap
65	March 1	Detroit	–	Toronto				0–0–0
66	March 3	Seattle	–	Toronto				0–0–0
67	March 5	Toronto	–	Carolina				0–0–0
68	March 6	Toronto	–	Florida				0–0–0
69	March 8	Dallas	–	Toronto				0–0–0
70	March 11	Toronto	–	Winnipeg				0–0–0
71	March 13	Vancouver	–	Toronto				0–0–0
72	March 15	Florida	–	Toronto				0–0–0
73	March 17	Tampa Bay	–	Toronto				0–0–0
74	March 18	Toronto	–	NY Rangers				0–0–0
75	March 20	Toronto	–	New Jersey				0–0–0
76	March 22	Toronto	–	Montreal				0–0–0
77	March 25	Toronto	–	Buffalo				0–0–0
78	March 27	Ottawa	–	Toronto				0–0–0
79	March 28	Washington	–	Toronto				0–0–0
80	March 30	Toronto	–	Tampa Bay				0–0–0

April: 0–0–0, 0 points (Home: 0–0–0; Road: 0–0–0)
#	Date	Visitor	Score	Home	OT	Decision	Attendance	Record	Pts	Recap
81	April 1	Toronto	–	Florida				0–0–0
82	April 3	Buffalo	–	Toronto				0–0–0
83	April 5	Boston	–	Toronto				0–0–0
84	April 10	Toronto	–	NY Rangers				0–0–0

== Roster ==
Updated November 15, 2026

No.	Nat	Player	Pos	S/G	Age	Acquired	Birthplace
3	(United States)	Nick Blankenburg	D	R	28	2026	Washington Township, Michigan
73	(Latvia)	Teddy Blueger	C	L	32	2026	Riga, Latvia
72	(Russia)	Sergei Bobrovsky	G	L	38	2026	Novokuznetsk, Soviet Union
53	(Canada)	Easton Cowan	RW	L	21	2023	Mount Brydges, Ontario
11	(Canada)	Max Domi	LW	L	31	2023	Winnipeg, Manitoba
24	(United States)	Brandon Duhaime	LW	L	29	2026	Coral Springs, Florida
95	(Sweden)	Oliver Ekman-Larsson	D	L	35	2024	Karlskrona, Sweden
29	(Canada)	Benoit-Olivier Groulx	C	L	26	2025	Rouen, France
81	(United States)	Dakota Joshua	C	L	30	2025	Dearborn, Michigan
71	(United States)	Vinni Lettieri	C	R	31	2025	Excelsior, Minnesota
19	(Canada)	Zack MacEwen	C	R	30	2026	Charlottetown, Prince Edward Island
86	(Russia)	Kirill Marchenko	RW	R	26	2026	Barnaul, Russia
34	(United States)	Auston Matthews (C)	C	L	29	2016	San Ramon, California
22	(United States)	Jake McCabe	D	L	33	2023	Eau Claire, Wisconsin
92	(Canada)	Gavin McKenna	LW	L	18	2026	Whitehorse, Yukon
82	(Canada)	Cole McWard	D	R	25	2026	Fenton, Missouri
36	(United States)	Dakota Mermis	D	L	32	2025	Alton, Illinois
90	(Latvia)	Elvis Merzļikins	G	L	32	2026	Riga, Latvia
88	(Sweden)	William Nylander	RW	R	30	2014	Calgary, Alberta
20	(Canada)	Nick Paul	LW	L	31	2026	Mississauga, Ontario
43	(Canada)	Darren Raddysh	D	R	30	2026	Caledon, Ontario
44	(Canada)	Morgan Rielly (A)	D	L	32	2012	West Vancouver, British Columbia
83	(Canada)	Marshall Rifai	D	L	28	2023	Beaconsfield, Quebec
96	(United States)	Jack Roslovic	C	R	29	2026	Columbus, Ohio
15	(Canada)	Colton Sissons	C	R	33	2026	North Vancouver, British Columbia
28	(Canada)	Troy Stecher	D	R	32	2025	Richmond, British Columbia
41	(United States)	Anthony Stolarz	G	L	32	2024	Edison, New Jersey
8	(Canada)	Christopher Tanev	D	R	36	2024	East York, Ontario
91	(Canada)	John Tavares (A)	C	L	36	2018	Mississauga, Ontario
76	(Canada)	William Villeneuve	D	R	24	2020	Sherbrooke, Quebec
18	(United States)	Miles Wood	LW	L	31	2026	Buffalo, New York

== Transactions ==
The Maple Leafs have been involved in the following transactions during the 2026–27 season.

=== Key ===
† Contract is entry-level.
‡ Contract initially takes effect in the 2027–28 season.

=== Trades ===
Date	Details		Ref
June 26, 2026	To Ottawa Senators Samuel Ersson	To Toronto Maple Leafs 5th-round pick in 2027	
June 27, 2026	To St. Louis Blues Brandon Carlo	To Toronto Maple Leafs SJ 3rd-round pick in 2026; NJ 3rd-round pick in 2026	
June 27, 2026	To Vancouver Canucks OTT 5th-round pick in 2027	To Toronto Maple Leafs 6th-round pick in 2026	
July 1, 2026	To Tampa Bay Lightning Dennis Hildeby; 3rd-round pick in 2028; 4th-round pick in 2027	To Toronto Maple Leafs Nick Paul	
July 1, 2026	To Pittsburgh Penguins Nicholas Robertson	To Toronto Maple Leafs 4th-round pick in 2028	
September 28, 2026	To Columbus Blue Jackets Emil Andrae; Matthew Knies; Steven Lorentz; SEA 2nd-round pick in 2027	To Toronto Maple Leafs Kirill Marchenko; Miles Wood; Elvis Merzļikins	
October 15, 2026	To Vancouver Canucks Brandon Buhr; Jacob Quillan	To Toronto Maple Leafs Aatu Räty	

=== Players acquired ===
Date	Player	Former team	Term	Via	Ref
July 1, 2026	Teddy Blueger	Vancouver Canucks	2-year	Free agency	
July 1, 2026	Sergei Bobrovsky	Florida Panthers	3-year	Free agency	
July 1, 2026	Zack MacEwen	New Jersey Devils	2-year	Free agency	
July 1, 2026	Jack Roslovic	Edmonton Oilers	2-year	Free agency	
July 1, 2026	Colton Sissons	Vegas Golden Knights	2-year	Free agency	
July 2, 2026	Brandon Duhaime	Washington Capitals	3-year	Free agency	
July 3, 2026	Samuel Hlavaj	Minnesota Wild	1-year	Free agency	
July 3, 2026	Cole McWard	New York Islanders	2-year	Free agency	
July 3, 2026	Henrik Rybinski	Washington Capitals	2-year	Free agency	
September 4, 2026	Brendan Brisson	New York Rangers	1-year	Free agency	
September 27, 2026	Nick Blankenburg	Colorado Avalanche	1-year	Free agency	

=== Players lost ===
Date	Player	New team	Term	Via	Ref
July 1, 2026	Matias Maccelli	New York Islanders	1-year	Free agency	
July 2, 2026	Henry Thrun	Winnipeg Jets	1-year	Free agency	

=== Signings ===
Date	Player	Term	Ref
June 29, 2026	Troy Stecher	2-year	
July 3, 2026	Vinni Lettieri	1-year	
July 3, 2026	Gavin McKenna	3-year†	
July 4, 2026	Emil Andrae	2-year	
July 8, 2026	Jacob Quillan	1-year	
July 8, 2026	Ryan Tverberg	1-year	
July 8, 2026	William Villeneuve	2-year	

== Draft picks ==
Below are the Toronto Maple Leafs' selections at the 2026 NHL entry draft, which was held on June 26 and 27, 2026, at the KeyBank Center in Buffalo, New York.

Round	#	Player	Pos	Nationality	Team (league)
1	1	Gavin McKenna	LW	Canada	Penn State (Big Ten)
2	60	Alexander Bilecki	D	Canada	Kitchener Rangers (OHL)
3	69	Ethan MacKenzie	D	Canada	Edmonton Oil Kings (WHL)
3	73	Zach Olsen	RW	Canada	Saskatoon Blades (WHL)
3	76	Mans Gudmundsson	D	Sweden	Färjestad BK (J20 Nationell)
3	85	Juuso Ainasto	G	Finland	Jokerit (U20 SM-sarja)
4	114	Patriks Plumins	G	Latvia	HK Zemgale/LBTU (LHHL)
5	158	Cooper Williams	C	Canada	Saskatoon Blades (WHL)
6	161	Yaroslav Fedoseyev	D	Russia	Belye Medvedi (JHL)
6	169	Brody Pepoy	RW	United States	Saginaw Spirit (OHL)
