= 2026–27 Anaheim Ducks season =

National Hockey League season

2026–27 Anaheim Ducks
- Division: Pacific
- Conference: Western
- 2026–27 record: 11–12–1
- Home record: 4–6–1
- Road record: 7–6–0
- Goals for: 87
- Goals against: 92

Team information
- General manager: Pat Verbeek
- Coach: Joel Quenneville
- Captain: Mikael Granlund
- Alternate captains: Leo Carlsson; Alex Killorn; Jackson LaCombe; Troy Terry
- Arena: Honda Center
- Minor league affiliates: San Diego Gulls (AHL); Tulsa Oilers (ECHL)

Team leaders
- Goals: Cutter Gauthier (21)
- Assists: Jackson LaCombe (24)
- Points: Cutter Gauthier (30)
- Penalty minutes: Jeff Malott (36)
- Plus/minus: Jeff Malott (+4)
- Wins: Laurent Brossoit; Lukáš Dostál (4)
- Goals against average: Laurent Brossoit (3.42)

The 2026–27 Anaheim Ducks season is the 34th season of operation, and the 33rd season of play, for the National Hockey League (NHL) franchise that was established on June 15, 1993.

This will be the second season under head coach Joel Quenneville.

== Standings ==
=== Divisional standings ===
Pacific Division
Pos	Team	GP	W	L	OTL	RW	GF	GA	GD	Pts
1	Edmonton Oilers	25	17	5	3	14	97	72	+25	37
2	Vegas Golden Knights	25	14	6	5	11	85	75	+10	33
3	San Jose Sharks	25	11	12	2	4	69	89	−20	24
4	Anaheim Ducks	24	11	12	1	10	87	92	−5	23
5	Calgary Flames	24	10	12	2	9	60	84	−24	22
6	Seattle Kraken	20	10	9	1	7	67	71	−4	21
7	Los Angeles Kings	21	7	12	2	4	58	70	−12	16
8	Vancouver Canucks	25	6	18	1	3	71	108	−37	13

Updated to game(s) played on November 21, 2026. Source: National Hockey League
Rules for classification: 1) Fewer number of games played (GP, only during regular season); 2) Greater number of regulation wins (RW); 3) Greater number of wins in regulation and overtime, excluding shootout wins (ROW); 4) Greater number of total wins, including shootouts (W); 5) Greater number of points earned in head-to-head play; if teams played an uneven number of head-to-head games, the result of the first game on the home ice of the team with the extra home game is discarded; 6) Greater goal differential (GD); 7) Greater number of goals scored (GF)

=== Conference standings ===
Western Conference Wild Card
Pos	Div	Team	GP	W	L	OTL	RW	GF	GA	GD	Pts
1	CE	Nashville Predators	23	12	6	5	9	71	69	+2	29
2	CE	Utah Mammoth	24	12	9	3	10	80	81	−1	27
3	CE	St. Louis Blues	23	12	9	2	11	77	73	+4	26
4	CE	Winnipeg Jets	24	11	9	4	8	75	82	−7	26
5	PA	Anaheim Ducks	24	11	12	1	10	87	92	−5	23
6	PA	Calgary Flames	24	10	12	2	9	60	84	−24	22
7	PA	Seattle Kraken	20	10	9	1	7	67	71	−4	21
8	PA	Los Angeles Kings	21	7	12	2	4	58	70	−12	16
9	CE	Chicago Blackhawks	23	7	14	2	4	58	93	−35	16
10	PA	Vancouver Canucks	25	6	18	1	3	71	108	−37	13

Updated to game(s) played on November 21, 2026. Source: National Hockey League
Rules for classification: 1) Fewer number of games played (GP, only during regular season); 2) Greater number of regulation wins (RW); 3) Greater number of wins in regulation and overtime, excluding shootout wins (ROW); 4) Greater number of total wins, including shootouts (W); 5) Greater number of points earned in head-to-head play; if teams played an uneven number of head-to-head games, the result of the first game on the home ice of the team with the extra home game is discarded; 6) Greater goal differential (GD); 7) Greater number of goals scored (GF)

== Schedule and results ==
=== Preseason ===
The Anaheim Ducks preseason schedule was released on June 22, 2026.

2026 preseason game log: 1–3–0 (home: 1–1–0; road: 0–2–0)

#	Date	Visitor	Score	Home	OT	Decision	Location	Attendance	Record
1	September 20	San Jose	2–6	Anaheim		Brossoit (1–0–0)	Honda Center	10,000	1–0–0
2	September 23	Los Angeles	2–1	Anaheim		Dostál (0–1–0)	Honda Center	14,696	1–1–0
3	September 24	Anaheim	0–10	San Jose		Husso (0–1–0)	SAP Center	11,678	1–2–0
4	September 26	Anaheim	2–6	Los Angeles		Dostál(0–2–0)	Crypto.com Arena	12,995	1–3–0

Legend:

Win Loss OT/SO Loss

=== Regular season ===
The Anaheim Ducks regular season schedule was released on July 16, 2026.

2026–27 game log: 11–12–1 (home: 4–6–1; road: 7–6–0), 23 points
October: 5–7–1 (home: 1–4–1; road: 4–3–0), 11 points

#	Date	Visitor	Score	Home	OT	Decision	Location	Attendance	Record	Points	Recap
1	October 2	Anaheim	4–3	Vegas		Dostál (1–0–0)	T-Mobile Arena	17,819	1–0–0	2	
2	October 4	Florida	2–3	Anaheim	OT	Dostál (2–0–0)	Honda Center	17,174	2–0–0	4	
3	October 7	Edmonton	5–2	Anaheim		Dostál (2–1–0)	Honda Center	17,174	2–1–0	4	
4	October 9	Anaheim	5–1	Winnipeg		Dostál (3–1–0)	Canada Life Centre	13,693	3–1–0	6	
5	October 10	Anaheim	4–2	Calgary		Husso (1–0–0)	Scotiabank Saddledome	16,894	4–1–0	8	
6	October 13	Calgary	4–2	Anaheim		Dostál (3–2–0)	Honda Center	17,174	4–2–0	8	
7	October 16	Boston	4–2	Anaheim		Dostál (3–3–0)	Honda Center	17,174	4–3–0	8	
8	October 19	Anaheim	2–5	NY Rangers		Husso (1–1–0)	Madison Square Garden	18,006	4–4–0	8	
9	October 20	Anaheim	2–3	NY Islanders		Dostál (3–4–0)	UBS Arena	13,273	4–5–0	8	
10	October 22	Anaheim	1–4	New Jersey		Husso (1–2–0)	Prudential Center	16,049	4–6–0	8	
11	October 24	Anaheim	5–4	Philadelphia		Dostál (4–4–0)	Xfinity Mobile Arena	18,338	5–6–0	10	
12	October 27	Vancouver	6–5	Anaheim	OT	Dostál (4–4–1)	Honda Center	14,000	5–6–1	11	
13	October 29	Buffalo	7–6	Anaheim		Husso (1–3–0)	Honda Center	15,575	5–7–1	11	

November: 6–5–0 (home: 3–2–0; road: 3–3–0), 12 points

#	Date	Visitor	Score	Home	OT	Decision	Location	Attendance	Record	Points	Recap
14	November 1	Ottawa	3–6	Anaheim		Brossoit (1–0–0)	Honda Center	17,174	6–7–1	13	
15	November 3	Anaheim	5–4	Vancouver		Brossoit (2–0–0)	Rogers Arena	17,100	7–7–1	15	
16	November 5	Anaheim	5–4	Edmonton		Brossoit (3–0–0)	Rogers Place	16,587	8–7–1	17	
17	November 6	Anaheim	5–3	Calgary		Husso (2–3–0)	Scotiabank Saddledome	17,455	9–7–1	19	
18	November 8	Pittsburgh	2–5	Anaheim		Brossoit (4–0–0)	Honda Center	17,174	10–7–1	21	
19	November 11	Nashville	4–2	Anaheim		Brossoit (4–1–0)	Honda Center	17,174	10–8–1	21	
20	November 14	NY Islanders	6–2	Anaheim		Dostál (4–5–1)	Honda Center	16,184	10–9–1	21	
21	November 15	Calgary	1–6	Anaheim		Husso (3–3–0)	Honda Center	15,686	11–9–1	23	
22	November 17	Anaheim	6–8	St. Louis		Dostál (4–6–1)	Enterprise Center	17,007	11–10–1	23	
23	November 19	Anaheim	0–4	Colorado		Dostál (4–7–1)	Ball Arena	18,116	11-11-1	23	
24	November 21	Anaheim	2-3	Utah		Husso (3–4–0)	Delta Center	14,111	11-12-1	23	
25	November 23	Anaheim	–	Seattle			Climate Pledge Arena				
26	November 25	San Jose	–	Anaheim			Honda Center				
27	November 27	Los Angeles	–	Anaheim			Honda Center				
28	November 28	Anaheim	–	Los Angeles			Crypto.com Arena				

December: 0–0–0 (home: 0–0–0; road: 0–0–0), 0 points

#	Date	Visitor	Score	Home	OT	Decision	Location	Attendance	Record	Points	Recap
29	December 1	Minnesota	–	Anaheim			Honda Center				
30	December 4	Seattle	–	Anaheim			Honda Center				
31	December 6	Winnipeg	–	Anaheim			Honda Center				
32	December 8	Anaheim	–	Ottawa			Canadian Tire Centre				
33	December 10	Anaheim	–	Montreal			Bell Centre				
34	December 12	Anaheim	–	Buffalo			KeyBank Center				
35	December 13	Anaheim	–	Toronto			Scotiabank Arena				
36	December 16	Vancouver	–	Anaheim			Honda Center				
37	December 18	Anaheim	–	Minnesota			Grand Casino Arena				
38	December 20	Anaheim	–	Edmonton			Rogers Place				
39	December 22	Vegas	–	Anaheim			Honda Center				
40	December 27	Colorado	–	Anaheim			Honda Center				
41	December 29	Toronto	–	Anaheim			Honda Center				

January: 0–0–0 (home: 0–0–0; road: 0–0–0), 0 points

#	Date	Visitor	Score	Home	OT	Decision	Location	Attendance	Record	Points	Recap
42	January 1	New Jersey	–	Anaheim			Honda Center				
43	January 3	Philadelphia	–	Anaheim			Honda Center				
44	January 5	Minnesota	–	Anaheim			Honda Center				
45	January 8	Dallas	–	Anaheim			Honda Center				
46	January 10	Washington	–	Anaheim			Honda Center				
47	January 12	NY Rangers	–	Anaheim			Honda Center				
48	January 14	St. Louis	–	Anaheim			Honda Center				
49	January 16	Anaheim	–	Winnipeg			Canada Life Centre				
50	January 19	Anaheim	–	Detroit			Little Caesars Arena				
51	January 21	Anaheim	–	Pittsburgh			PPG Paints Arena				
52	January 23	Anaheim	–	Carolina			Lenovo Center				
53	January 24	Anaheim	–	Columbus			Nationwide Arena				
54	January 26	Anaheim	–	Dallas			American Airlines Center				
55	January 28	Chicago	–	Anaheim			Honda Center				
56	January 30	Nashville	–	Anaheim			Honda Center				

February: 0–0–0 (home: 0–0–0; road: 0–0–0), 0 points

#	Date	Visitor	Score	Home	OT	Decision	Location	Attendance	Record	Points	Recap
57	February 9	Detroit	–	Anaheim			Honda Center				
58	February 11	Chicago	–	Anaheim			Honda Center				
59	February 13	Anaheim	–	Nashville			Bridgestone Arena				
60	February 15	Anaheim	–	Boston			TD Garden				
61	February 16	Anaheim	–	Washington			Capital One Arena				
62	February 18	Anaheim	–	Tampa Bay			Benchmark International Arena				
63	February 20	Anaheim	–	Florida			Amerant Bank Arena				
64	February 24	Seattle	–	Anaheim			Honda Center				
65	February 26	Anaheim	–	Vegas			T-Mobile Arena				
66	February 27	Montreal	–	Anaheim			Honda Center				

March: 0–0–0 (home: 0–0–0; road: 0–0–0), 0 points

#	Date	Visitor	Score	Home	OT	Decision	Location	Attendance	Record	Points	Recap
67	March 1	Anaheim	–	Los Angeles			Crypto.com Arena				
68	March 5	Tampa Bay	–	Anaheim			Honda Center				
69	March 7	Columbus	–	Anaheim			Honda Center				
70	March 10	Anaheim	–	Dallas			American Airlines Center				
71	March 13	Anaheim	–	St. Louis			Enterprise Center				
72	March 14	Anaheim	–	Chicago			United Center				
73	March 16	Carolina	–	Anaheim			Honda Center				
74	March 18	Utah	–	Anaheim			Honda Center				
75	March 20	Vegas	–	Anaheim			Honda Center				
76	March 22	San Jose	–	Anaheim			Honda Center				
77	March 24	Anaheim	–	San Jose			SAP Center				
78	March 25	Anaheim	–	Seattle			Climate Pledge Arena				
79	March 27	Anaheim	–	Vancouver			Rogers Arena				
80	March 30	Colorado	–	Anaheim			Honda Center				

April: 0–0–0 (home: 0–0–0; road: 0–0–0), 0 points

#	Date	Visitor	Score	Home	OT	Decision	Location	Attendance	Record	Points	Recap
81	April 1	Anaheim	–	Utah			Delta Center				
82	April 3	Edmonton	–	Anaheim			Honda Center				
83	April 6	Los Angeles	–	Anaheim			Honda Center				
84	April 10	Anaheim	–	San Jose			SAP Center				

Legend: Win Loss OT/SO Loss

== Roster ==
Updated November 21, 2026

No.	Nat	Player	Pos	S/G	Age	Acquired	Birthplace
91	(Sweden)	Leo Carlsson (A)	C	L	21	2023	Karlstad, Sweden
28	(United States)	Judd Caulfield	RW	R	25	2023	Grand Forks, North Dakota
12	(United States)	Sam Colangelo	RW	R	24	2020	Stoneham, Massachusetts
1	(Czech Republic)	Lukáš Dostál	G	L	26	2018	Brno, Czech Republic
61	(United States)	Cutter Gauthier	LW	L	22	2024	Skellefteå, Sweden
64	(Finland)	Mikael Granlund (C)	C	L	34	2025	Oulu, Finland
18	(Canada)	A. J. Greer	LW	L	29	2026	Notre-Dame-des-Prairies, Quebec
14	(United States)	Drew Helleson	D	R	25	2022	Farmington, Minnesota
55	(Canada)	Tyson Hinds	D	L	23	2021	Gatineau, Quebec
33	(Finland)	Ville Husso	G	L	31	2025	Helsinki, Finland
17	(Canada)	Alex Killorn (A)	LW	L	37	2023	Halifax, Nova Scotia
2	(United States)	Jackson LaCombe (A)	D	L	25	2019	Eden Prairie, Minnesota
67	(Canada)	Tristan Luneau	D	R	22	2022	Victoriaville, Quebec
39	(Canada)	Jeff Malott	LW	L	30	2026	Burlington, Ontario
95	(Canada)	Roger McQueen	C	R	20	2025	Saskatoon, Saskatchewan
98	(Russia)	Pavel Mintyukov	D	L	22	2022	Moscow, Russia
3	(United States)	Ian Moore	D	R	24	2020	Concord, Massachusetts
48	(Canada)	Nico Myatovic	LW	L	21	2023	Prince George, British Columbia
13	(United States)	Nikita Nesterenko	C	L	25	2023	Brooklyn, New York
25	(United States)	Ryan Poehling	C	L	27	2025	Lakeville, Minnesota
45	(Canada)	Beckett Sennecke	RW	R	20	2024	Toronto, Ontario
50	(Norway)	Stian Solberg	D	L	20	2024	Oslo, Norway
19	(United States)	Troy Terry (A)	RW	R	29	2015	Denver, Colorado
77	(United States)	Frank Vatrano	RW	L	32	2022	East Longmeadow, Massachusetts
47	(Canada)	Noah Warren	D	R	22	2022	Montreal, Quebec
42	(United States)	Tim Washe	C	L	25	2025	Clarkston, Michigan

== Player statistics ==
As of June 29, 2026

=== Goaltenders ===
^{†}Denotes player spent time with another team before joining the Ducks. Stats reflect time with the Ducks only.
^{‡}Denotes player was traded mid-season. Stats reflect time with the Ducks only.
Bold/italics denotes franchise record.

== Transactions ==
The Ducks have been involved in the following transactions during the 2026–27 season.

=== Key ===
† Entry-Level Contract
‡ Contract initially takes effect in the 2027–28 season

=== Trades ===
Date	Details		Ref
July 27, 2026	To Montreal Canadiens Rights to Sasha Pastujov	To Anaheim Ducks Rights to Sean Farrell	
August 19, 2026	To Pittsburgh Penguins Future considerations	To Anaheim Ducks Rights to Cruz Lucius	

=== Players acquired ===
Date	Player	Former team	Term	Via	Ref
July 1, 2026	Nick Jensen	Ottawa Senators	2-year	Free Agency	
July 1, 2026	Jeff Malott	Los Angeles Kings	3-year	Free Agency	
July 1, 2026	Laurent Brossoit	San Jose Sharks	1-year	Free Agency	
July 1, 2026	Jett Woo	San Jose Sharks	2-year	Free Agency	
July 1, 2026	James Hamblin	Edmonton Oilers	2-year	Free Agency	
July 1, 2026	Corey Schueneman	Washington Capitals	2-year	Free Agency	
July 1, 2026	Travis Mitchell	New York Islanders	1-year	Free Agency	

=== Players lost ===
Date	Player	New team	Term	Via	Ref
July 1, 2026	Ross Johnston	St. Louis Blues	3-year	Free Agency	
July 1, 2026	Jeffrey Viel	Tampa Bay Lightning	5-year	Free Agency	
July 1, 2026	Jacob Trouba	San Jose Sharks	4-year	Free Agency	
July 3, 2026	Jansen Harkins	Tampa Bay Lightning	1-year	Free Agency	
July 20, 2026	Jeremie Biakabutuka	Hershey Bears (AHL)	1-year	Free agency	
July 24, 2026	Vyacheslav Buteyets	Shanghai Dragons (KHL)	2-year	Free agency	
September 13, 2026	Chris Kreider	Montreal Canadiens	1-year	Free Agency	

=== Offer sheets ===
Date offered	Player	Offering team	Original team	Contract offered (Note: Number displayed is the annual average value of the contract.)	Date resolved	Result	Compensation	Ref
July 3, 2026	Leo Carlsson	Philadelphia Flyers	Anaheim Ducks	5 years $18,000,000	July 9, 2026	Matched	first-round picks in 2027, 2028, 2029, 2030, or 2031	

=== Retirement ===
Date	Player	Ref

=== Signings ===
Date	Player	Term	Ref
July 1, 2026	Judd Caulfield	2-year	
July 6, 2026	Pavel Mintyukov	5-year	
July 7, 2026	Tyson Hinds	2-year	
July 15, 2026	Marcus Nordmark	3-year†	
July 25, 2026	Nikita Klepov	3-year†	
July 28, 2026	Sean Farrell	1-year	
August 20, 2026	Cruz Lucius	2-year†	
September 15, 2026	Cutter Gauthier	6-year	
September 19, 2026	Tim Washe	4-year‡	
October 1, 2026	Tristan Luneau	6-year‡	

== Draft picks ==
Below are the Anaheim Ducks selections at the 2026 NHL entry draft, which was held on June 26 and 27, 2026, at the KeyBank Center in Buffalo, New York.

Round	#	Player	Pos	Nationality	College/Junior/Club team	League
1	15	Nikita Klepov	RW	United States	Saginaw Spirit	OHL
1	28	Marcus Nordmark	LW	Sweden	Djurgårdens IF	SHL
2	45	Jayden Kurtz	D	United States	Rogers Royals	(USHS-MN)
2	50	Mathis Preston	RW	Canada	Vancouver Giants	WHL
3	82	Rian Chudzinski	RW	United States	Moncton Wildcats	QMJHL
5	146	Eric Frossard	D	Canada	Guelph Storm	OHL
6	178	Gleb Peshkov	G	Russia	Taifun Primorsky Krai	JHL
6	192	Noah Kosick	C	Germany	Seattle Thunderbirds	WHL
7	210	Jimmy Rieber	D	United States	Waterloo Black Hawks	USHL
