= 2026–27 Winnipeg Jets season =

National Hockey League season

2026–27 Winnipeg Jets
- Division: Central
- Conference: Western
- 2026–27 record: 11–9–4
- Home record: 6–5–2
- Road record: 5–4–2
- Goals for: 75
- Goals against: 82

Team information
- General manager: Kevin Cheveldayoff
- Coach: Scott Arniel
- Captain: Adam Lowry
- Alternate captains: Josh Morrissey; Mark Scheifele
- Arena: Canada Life Centre
- Minor league affiliate: Manitoba Moose (AHL)

Team leaders
- Goals: Kyle Connor (17)
- Assists: Mark Scheifele (19)
- Points: Kyle Connor; Mark Scheifele (26)
- Penalty minutes: Tyrel Bauer (30)
- Plus/minus: Josh Morrissey (+6)
- Wins: Stuart Skinner (7)
- Goals against average: Nico Daws (2.32)

The 2026–27 Winnipeg Jets season is the 44th season of play for the National Hockey League (NHL) franchise that was established on June 22, 1979, 52nd season for the organization overall, and the 16th in Winnipeg, since the franchise relocated from Atlanta prior to the start of the 2011–12 NHL season.

On September 24, 2026, the NHL announced that the franchise records and statistics of the original Winnipeg Jets from 1972 to 1996 would be moved from the inactive Arizona Coyotes franchise to the current Jets franchise. As a result, the Jets' franchise records include both its original and current incarnations as well as the Atlanta Thrashers.

This is the first season since 2016–17 without star goaltender Connor Hellebuyck on the opening night roster, as he was suspended prior to the beginning of the season and was subsequently traded to the New Jersey Devils.

== Standings ==
=== Divisional standings ===
Central Division
Pos	Team	GP	W	L	OTL	RW	GF	GA	GD	Pts
1	Minnesota Wild	24	17	3	4	16	87	52	+35	38
2	Dallas Stars	22	14	6	2	8	64	56	+8	30
3	Colorado Avalanche	23	13	7	3	13	90	68	+22	29
4	Nashville Predators	22	11	6	5	8	67	66	+1	27
5	Utah Mammoth	23	11	9	3	9	77	79	−2	25
6	Winnipeg Jets	23	11	9	3	8	71	77	−6	25
7	St. Louis Blues	22	11	9	2	10	68	67	+1	24
8	Chicago Blackhawks	22	6	14	2	4	54	90	−36	14

Updated to game(s) played on November 19, 2026. Source: National Hockey League
Rules for classification: 1) Fewer number of games played (GP, only during regular season); 2) Greater number of regulation wins (RW); 3) Greater number of wins in regulation and overtime, excluding shootout wins (ROW); 4) Greater number of total wins, including shootouts (W); 5) Greater number of points earned in head-to-head play; if teams played an uneven number of head-to-head games, the result of the first game on the home ice of the team with the extra home game is discarded; 6) Greater goal differential (GD); 7) Greater number of goals scored (GF)

=== Conference standings ===
Western Conference Wild Card
Pos	Div	Team	GP	W	L	OTL	RW	GF	GA	GD	Pts
1	CE	Nashville Predators	22	11	6	5	8	67	66	+1	27
2	CE	Utah Mammoth	23	11	9	3	9	77	79	−2	25
3	CE	Winnipeg Jets	23	11	9	3	8	71	77	−6	25
4	CE	St. Louis Blues	22	11	9	2	10	68	67	+1	24
5	PA	San Jose Sharks	24	10	12	2	3	65	86	−21	22
6	PA	Seattle Kraken	19	10	8	1	7	64	67	−3	21
7	PA	Calgary Flames	23	10	12	1	9	57	80	−23	21
8	PA	Los Angeles Kings	20	7	11	2	4	56	66	−10	16
9	CE	Chicago Blackhawks	22	6	14	2	4	54	90	−36	14
10	PA	Vancouver Canucks	24	5	18	1	3	67	105	−38	11

Updated to game(s) played on November 19, 2026. Source: National Hockey League
Rules for classification: 1) Fewer number of games played (GP, only during regular season); 2) Greater number of regulation wins (RW); 3) Greater number of wins in regulation and overtime, excluding shootout wins (ROW); 4) Greater number of total wins, including shootouts (W); 5) Greater number of points earned in head-to-head play; if teams played an uneven number of head-to-head games, the result of the first game on the home ice of the team with the extra home game is discarded; 6) Greater goal differential (GD); 7) Greater number of goals scored (GF)

== Schedule and results ==
=== Preseason ===
The Winnipeg Jets 2026 pre-season schedule was released on June 17, 2026.

2026 preseason: 1–2–1 (home: 1–0–1; road: 0–2–0)

Game	Date	Visitor	Score	Home	OT	Decision	Location	Attendance	Record	Recap
1	September 19	Winnipeg	2–5	Edmonton		Milic	Rogers Place	15,730	0–1–0	
2	September 21	Colorado	1–3	Winnipeg		Skinner	Canada Life Centre	13,363	1–1–0	
3	September 22	Edmonton	2–1	Winnipeg	OT	DiVincentiis	Canada Life Centre	14,144	1–1–1	
4	September 25	Winnipeg	2–5	Colorado		Skinner	Ball Arena	14,990	1–2–1	

=== Regular season ===
The Winnipeg Jets regular season schedule was released on July 16, 2026.

2026–27 game log
October: 4–7–3 (home: 2–4–1; road: 2–3–2)

Game	Date	Visitor	Score	Home	OT	Decision	Location	Attendance	Record	Points	Recap
1	October 2	Boston	4–3	Winnipeg	OT	Skinner	Canada Life Centre	15,209	0–0–1	1	
2	October 4	Winnipeg	3–2	Detroit		Skinner	Little Caesars Arena	17,426	1–0–1	3	
3	October 5	Winnipeg	3–2	Pittsburgh		Stevenson	PPG Paints Arena	17,767	2–0–1	5	
4	October 7	Colorado	2–3	Winnipeg		Skinner	Canada Life Centre	14,006	3–0–1	7	
5	October 9	Anaheim	5–1	Winnipeg		Stevenson	Canada Life Centre	13,693	3–1–1	7	
6	October 13	Minnesota	2–5	Winnipeg		Skinner	Canada Life Centre	14,108	4–1–1	9	
7	October 15	Winnipeg	3–4	Chicago	OT	Skinner	United Center	15,028	4–1–2	10	
8	October 17	Carolina	3–2	Winnipeg		Stevenson	Canada Life Centre	14,415	4–2–2	10	
9	October 20	Winnipeg	1–2	St. Louis		Skinner	Enterprise Center	18,096	4–3–2	10	
10	October 22	Winnipeg	2–3	Dallas	OT	Skinner	American Airlines Center	18,532	4–3–3	11	
11	October 25	Montreal	2–1	Winnipeg		Skinner	Princess Auto Stadium	32,342 (outdoors)	4–4–3	11	
12	October 27	Florida	5–1	Winnipeg		Stevenson	Canada Life Centre	14,336	4–5–3	11	
13	October 29	Winnipeg	4–6	Tampa Bay		Skinner	Benchmark International Arena	19,092	4–6–3	11	
14	October 30	Winnipeg	2–5	Florida		Daws	Amerant Bank Arena	19,656	4–7–3	11	

November: 7–2–1 (home: 4–1–1; road: 3–1–0)

Game	Date	Visitor	Score	Home	OT	Decision	Location	Attendance	Record	Points	Recap
15	November 1	Winnipeg	0–7	Carolina		Skinner	Lenovo Center	18,818	4–8–3	11	
16	November 3	Winnipeg	5–4	Montreal	OT	Skinner	Bell Centre	20,962	5–8–3	13	
17	November 5	Vancouver	2–6	Winnipeg		Skinner	Canada Life Centre	13,312	6–8–3	15	
18	November 8	Tampa Bay	3–4	Winnipeg		Skinner	Canada Life Centre	14,307	7–8–3	17	
19	November 10	New Jersey	2–4	Winnipeg		Daws	Canada Life Centre	15,209	8–8–3	19	
20	November 12	Winnipeg	8–3	Dallas		Skinner	American Airlines Center	18,532	9–8–3	21	
21	November 14	Winnipeg	5–4	Chicago	SO	Daws	United Center	18,451	10–8–3	23	
22	November 17	Ottawa	2–1	Winnipeg		Skinner	Canada Life Centre	13,516	10–9–3	23	
23	November 19	NY Islanders	3–4	Winnipeg	OT	Daws	Canada Life Centre	13,161	11–9–3	25	
24	November 21	Vegas	5–4	Winnipeg	SO	Skinner	Canada Life Centre	14,107	11–9–4	26	
25	November 23	Utah		Winnipeg			Canada Life Centre				
26	November 25	Winnipeg		Boston			TD Garden				
27	November 27	Winnipeg		NY Islanders			UBS Arena				
28	November 28	Winnipeg		New Jersey			Prudential Center				
29	November 30	Chicago		Winnipeg			Canada Life Centre				

December: 0–0–0 (home: 0–0–0; road: 0–0–0)

Game	Date	Visitor	Score	Home	OT	Decision	Location	Attendance	Record	Points	Recap
30	December 2	Winnipeg		Utah			Delta Center				
31	December 5	Winnipeg		Vegas			T-Mobile Arena				
32	December 6	Winnipeg		Anaheim			Honda Center				
33	December 8	Philadelphia		Winnipeg			Canada Life Centre				
34	December 10	Chicago		Winnipeg			Canada Life Centre				
35	December 12	Winnipeg		Minnesota			Grand Casino Arena				
36	December 15	Winnipeg		St. Louis			Enterprise Center				
37	December 19	Dallas		Winnipeg			Canada Life Centre				
38	December 20	Dallas		Winnipeg			Canada Life Centre				
39	December 22	Winnipeg		Nashville			Bridgestone Arena				
40	December 26	Winnipeg		Minnesota			Grand Casino Arena				
41	December 28	San Jose		Winnipeg			Canada Life Centre				
42	December 31	Winnipeg		Calgary			Scotiabank Saddledome				

January: 0–0–0 (home: 0–0–0; road: 0–0–0)

Game	Date	Visitor	Score	Home	OT	Decision	Location	Attendance	Record	Points	Recap
43	January 2	Calgary		Winnipeg			Canada Life Centre				
44	January 4	Winnipeg		Buffalo			KeyBank Center				
45	January 7	Nashville		Winnipeg			Canada Life Centre				
46	January 9	Utah		Winnipeg			Canada Life Centre				
47	January 11	Winnipeg		Toronto			Scotiabank Arena				
48	January 14	Winnipeg		Ottawa			Canadian Tire Centre				
49	January 16	Anaheim		Winnipeg			Canada Life Centre				
50	January 17	Winnipeg		Edmonton			Rogers Place				
51	January 19	Minnesota		Winnipeg			Canada Life Centre				
52	January 21	NY Rangers		Winnipeg			Canada Life Centre				
53	January 24	Buffalo		Winnipeg			Canada Life Centre				
54	January 28	Winnipeg		Columbus			Nationwide Arena				
55	January 30	Winnipeg		Philadelphia			Xfinity Mobile Arena				

February: 0–0–0 (home: 0–0–0; road: 0–0–0)

Game	Date	Visitor	Score	Home	OT	Decision	Location	Attendance	Record	Points	Recap
56	February 2	Winnipeg		Washington			Capital One Arena				
57	February 3	Winnipeg		NY Rangers			Madison Square Garden				
58	February 13	Winnipeg		Vancouver			Rogers Arena				
59	February 15	Winnipeg		San Jose			SAP Center				
60	February 17	Los Angeles		Winnipeg			Canada Life Centre				
61	February 19	St. Louis		Winnipeg			Canada Life Centre				
62	February 21	Pittsburgh		Winnipeg			Canada Life Centre				
63	February 23	Winnipeg		Nashville			Bridgestone Arena				
64	February 25	Winnipeg		Colorado			Ball Arena				
65	February 27	Winnipeg		Seattle			Climate Pledge Arena				

March: 0–0–0 (home: 0–0–0; road: 0–0–0)

Game	Date	Visitor	Score	Home	OT	Decision	Location	Attendance	Record	Points	Recap
66	March 1	Seattle		Winnipeg			Canada Life Centre				
67	March 5	Washington		Winnipeg			Canada Life Centre				
68	March 7	Calgary		Winnipeg			Canada Life Centre				
69	March 9	Detroit		Winnipeg			Canada Life Centre				
70	March 11	Toronto		Winnipeg			Canada Life Centre				
71	March 13	Nashville		Winnipeg			Canada Life Centre				
72	March 15	Winnipeg		Vegas			T-Mobile Arena				
73	March 16	Winnipeg		Los Angeles			Crypto.com Arena				
74	March 18	San Jose		Winnipeg			Canada Life Centre				
75	March 20	Columbus		Winnipeg			Canada Life Centre				
76	March 23	St. Louis		Winnipeg			Canada Life Centre				
77	March 25	Colorado		Winnipeg			Canada Life Centre				
78	March 27	Winnipeg		Colorado			Ball Arena				
79	March 31	Winnipeg		Los Angeles			Crypto.com Arena				

April: 0–0–0 (home: 0–0–0; road: 0–0–0)

Game	Date	Visitor	Score	Home	OT	Decision	Location	Attendance	Record	Points	Recap
80	April 3	Winnipeg		Seattle			Climate Pledge Arena				
81	April 5	Winnipeg		Utah			Delta Center				
82	April 7	Edmonton		Winnipeg			Canada Life Centre				
83	April 9	Vancouver		Winnipeg			Canada Life Centre				
84	April 10	Winnipeg		Edmonton			Rogers Place				

Win (2 Points) Loss (0 points) Overtime/shootout loss (1 point)

== Roster ==
Updated November 18, 2026

No.	Nat	Player	Pos	S/G	Age	Acquired	Birthplace
36	(Canada)	Morgan Barron	C	L	27	2022	Halifax, Nova Scotia
77	(Canada)	Tyrel Bauer	D	R	24	2020	Cochrane, Alberta
61	(Sweden)	Viggo Björck	C	R	18	2026	Stockholm, Sweden
72	(United States)	Nick Bjugstad	C	R	34	2026	Blaine, Minnesota
81	(United States)	Kyle Connor	LW	L	29	2015	Clinton Township, Michigan
35	(Canada)	Nico Daws	G	L	24	2026	Munich, Germany
2	(Canada)	Dylan DeMelo	D	R	33	2020	London, Ontario
38	(Canada)	Mario Ferraro	D	L	28	2026	King City, Ontario
24	(Canada)	Haydn Fleury	D	L	30	2024	Carlyle, Saskatchewan
9	(United States)	Alex Iafallo	LW	L	32	2023	Eden, New York
45	(United States)	Cole Koepke	LW	L	28	2025	Two Harbors, Minnesota
17	(Canada)	Adam Lowry (C)	C	L	33	2011	St. Louis, Missouri
19	(Canada)	Dawson Mercer	C	R	25	2026	Bay Roberts, Newfoundland
44	(Canada)	Josh Morrissey (A)	D	L	31	2013	Calgary, Alberta
7	(Russia)	Vladislav Namestnikov	C	L	34	2023	Voskresensk, Russia
62	(Switzerland)	Nino Niederreiter	RW	L	34	2023	Chur, Switzerland
91	(Canada)	Cole Perfetti	C	L	24	2020	Whitby, Ontario
4	(United States)	Neal Pionk	D	R	31	2019	Omaha, Nebraska
27	(Sweden)	Isak Rosén	RW	L	23	2026	Stockholm, Sweden
57	(Sweden)	Elias Salomonsson	D	R	22	2022	Skellefteå, Sweden
54	(United States)	Dylan Samberg	D	L	27	2017	Hermantown, Minnesota
55	(Canada)	Mark Scheifele (A)	C	R	33	2011	Kitchener, Ontario
74	(Canada)	Stuart Skinner	G	L	28	2026	Edmonton, Alberta
33	(Canada)	Clay Stevenson	G	L	27	2026	Drayton Valley, Alberta
8	(United States)	Henry Thrun	D	L	25	2026	Southborough, Massachusetts
13	(Canada)	Gabriel Vilardi	C	R	27	2023	Kingston, Ontario
29	(Canada)	Brayden Yager	C	R	21	2024	Saskatoon, Saskatchewan
53	(Canada)	Danny Zhilkin	C	L	22	2022	Moscow, Russia

== Player statistics ==
Key:

† Denotes player spent time with another team before joining the Jets. Stats reflect time with the Jets only.
‡ Denotes player was traded mid-season. Stats reflect time with the Jets only.

=== Skaters ===
Regular season
Player	GP	G	A	Pts	+/−	PIM
Kyle Connor	19	15	6	21	–3	2
Mark Scheifele	19	4	15	19	1	4
Cole Perfetti	19	7	9	16	2	4
Neal Pionk	19	4	8	12	–4	8
Gabriel Vilardi	19	1	8	9	–6	4
Alex Iafallo	19	4	4	8	–2	6
Dylan DeMelo	19	1	7	8	3	22
Morgan Barron	19	3	4	7	0	6
Dawson Mercer^{†}	9	3	3	6	–2	0
Adam Lowry	19	2	4	6	1	12
Dylan Samberg	19	2	4	6	0	8
Viggo Bjorck	19	0	4	4	–8	10
Cole Koepke	15	2	1	3	–3	4
Josh Morrissey	5	0	3	3	0	2
Haydn Fleury	13	0	3	3	–7	8
Mario Ferraro	19	2	0	2	–5	6
Tyrel Bauer	13	1	1	2	–1	30
Isak Rosen	13	1	1	2	–3	0
Brayden Yager	4	1	0	1	0	0
Vladislav Namestnikov	6	0	1	1	–2	4
Brad Lambert	11	0	1	1	–5	4
Nino Niederreiter	10	0	0	0	–3	4
Jack St. Ivany^{‡}	4	0	0	0	–1	2
Elias Salomonsson	6	0	0	0	–5	4

=== Goaltenders ===
Regular season
Player	GP	GS	TOI	W	L	OT	GA	GAA	SA	SV%	SO	G	A	PIM
Stuart Skinner	8	8	485:02	3	2	3	21	2.60	236	.911	0	0	0	0
Nico Daws^{†}	3	2	137:04	1	1	0	6	2.63	67	.910	0	0	0	0
Clay Stevenson	5	4	265:59	1	3	0	16	3.61	108	.870	0	0	0	0

== Transactions ==
The Jets have been involved in the following transactions during the 2026–27 season.

Key:

† Contract is entry-level.
‡ Contract initially takes effect in the 2027–28 season.

=== Trades ===
Date	Details		Ref
October 23, 2026	To New Jersey Devils Connor Hellebuyck	To Winnipeg Jets Dawson Mercer; Nico Daws; Nick Bjugstad; Alexander Command; 7th-round pick in 2027; 2nd-round pick in 2029	

=== Players acquired ===
Date	Player	Former team	Term	Via	Ref
July 1, 2026	Mario Ferraro	San Jose Sharks	3-year	Free agency	
July 1, 2026	Noah Gregor	Florida Panthers	1-year	Free agency	
July 1, 2026	Stuart Skinner	Pittsburgh Penguins	2-year	Free agency	
July 2, 2026	Henry Thrun	Toronto Maple Leafs	1-year	Free agency	

=== Players lost ===
Date	Player	New team	Term	Via	Ref
July 1, 2026	Jacob Bryson	Detroit Red Wings	1-year	Free agency	
July 1, 2026	Eric Comrie	San Jose Sharks	2-year	Free agency	
July 1, 2026	Ville Heinola	Vegas Golden Knights	1-year	Free agency	
July 1, 2026	Mason Shaw	Minnesota Wild	1-year	Free agency	

=== Signings ===
Date	Player	Term	Ref
July 13, 2026	Viggo Björck	3-year†	
July 15, 2026	Cole Perfetti	5-year	

== Draft picks ==
Below are the Winnipeg Jets' selections at the 2026 NHL entry draft, which was held on June 26 to 27, 2026, at KeyBank Center in Buffalo, New York.

Round	#	Player	Pos.	Nationality	Team (League)
1	8	Viggo Björck	C	Sweden	Djurgårdens IF (SHL)
3	71	Samuel Hrenak	G	Slovakia	Fargo Force (USHL)
4	116 (Note: The Edmonton Oilers' fourth-round pick will go to the Winnipeg Jets as the result of a trade on March 6, 2026, that sent Logan Stanley and Luke Schenn to Buffalo in exchange for Isak Rosén, Jacob Bryson, a second-round pick in 2027 and this pick (being conditional at the time of the trade). The condition – Winnipeg will receive the earlier of Edmonton or Buffalo's fourth-round picks in 2026 – was converted on April 30, 2026 when Edmonton was eliminated from the 2026 Stanley Cup playoffs ensuring they would have an earlier pick than Buffalo.)	Zach Wooten	LW	United States	Green Bay Gamblers (USHL)
5	135	Alexandre Talliefer	D	Canada	Quebec Remparts (QMJHL)
6	167	Landon Hafele	C	United States	Green Bay Gamblers (USHL)
7	199	Noa Ta'amu	D	United States	Edmonton Oil Kings (WHL)
7	220 (Note: The Buffalo Sabres' seventh-round pick will go to the Jets as the result of a trade on March 6, 2026, that sent Tanner Pearson to Buffalo in exchange for this pick.)	John Parsons	G	United States	Providence Friars (Hockey East)
