= 2026–27 Los Angeles Kings season =

National Hockey League season

2026–27 Los Angeles Kings
- Division: Pacific
- Conference: Western
- 2026–27 record: 6–11–2
- Home record: 2–8–0
- Road record: 4–3–2
- Goals for: 52
- Goals against: 63

Team information
- General manager: Ken Holland
- Coach: Peter Laviolette
- Captain: Drew Doughty
- Alternate captains: Mikey Anderson; Adrian Kempe; Artemi Panarin
- Arena: Crypto.com Arena
- Minor league affiliates: Ontario Reign (AHL); Greenville Swamp Rabbits (ECHL)

Team leaders
- Goals: Artemi Panarin (8)
- Assists: Brandt Clarke; Artemi Panarin (11)
- Points: Artemi Panarin (19)
- Penalty minutes: Brandt Clarke (23)
- Plus/minus: Drew Doughty (+7)
- Wins: Darcy Kuemper (6)
- Goals against average: Anton Forsberg (2.39)

The 2026–27 Los Angeles Kings season is the 60th season (59th season of play) for the National Hockey League (NHL) franchise that was established on June 5, 1967.

This is the first time since the 2005–06 season that Anže Kopitar will not be on the roster as he announced his retirement at the end the 2025–26 season.

== Standings ==
=== Divisional standings ===
Pacific Division
Pos	Team	GP	W	L	OTL	RW	GF	GA	GD	Pts
1	Edmonton Oilers	23	17	3	3	14	92	62	+30	37
2	Vegas Golden Knights	23	13	6	4	11	77	67	+10	30
3	Anaheim Ducks	22	11	10	1	10	85	85	0	23
4	San Jose Sharks	24	10	12	2	3	65	86	−21	22
5	Calgary Flames	22	10	11	1	9	56	76	−20	21
6	Seattle Kraken	18	9	8	1	6	59	66	−7	19
7	Los Angeles Kings	19	6	11	2	4	52	63	−11	14
8	Vancouver Canucks	23	5	17	1	3	66	100	−34	11

Updated to game(s) played on November 18, 2026. Source: National Hockey League
Rules for classification: 1) Fewer number of games played (GP, only during regular season); 2) Greater number of regulation wins (RW); 3) Greater number of wins in regulation and overtime, excluding shootout wins (ROW); 4) Greater number of total wins, including shootouts (W); 5) Greater number of points earned in head-to-head play; if teams played an uneven number of head-to-head games, the result of the first game on the home ice of the team with the extra home game is discarded; 6) Greater goal differential (GD); 7) Greater number of goals scored (GF)

=== Conference standings ===
Western Conference Wild Card
Pos	Div	Team	GP	W	L	OTL	RW	GF	GA	GD	Pts
1	CE	Nashville Predators	22	11	6	5	8	67	66	+1	27
2	CE	Utah Mammoth	23	11	9	3	9	77	79	−2	25
3	CE	Winnipeg Jets	22	10	9	3	8	67	74	−7	23
4	CE	St. Louis Blues	21	10	9	2	9	63	65	−2	22
5	PA	San Jose Sharks	24	10	12	2	3	65	86	−21	22
6	PA	Calgary Flames	22	10	11	1	9	56	76	−20	21
7	PA	Seattle Kraken	18	9	8	1	6	59	66	−7	19
8	PA	Los Angeles Kings	19	6	11	2	4	52	63	−11	14
9	CE	Chicago Blackhawks	21	6	13	2	4	52	86	−34	14
10	PA	Vancouver Canucks	23	5	17	1	3	66	100	−34	11

Updated to game(s) played on November 18, 2026. Source: National Hockey League
Rules for classification: 1) Fewer number of games played (GP, only during regular season); 2) Greater number of regulation wins (RW); 3) Greater number of wins in regulation and overtime, excluding shootout wins (ROW); 4) Greater number of total wins, including shootouts (W); 5) Greater number of points earned in head-to-head play; if teams played an uneven number of head-to-head games, the result of the first game on the home ice of the team with the extra home game is discarded; 6) Greater goal differential (GD); 7) Greater number of goals scored (GF)

== Schedule and results ==
=== Preseason ===
The preseason schedule was published on June 22, 2026.

2026 preseason game log: 2–2–0 (Home: 1–2–0; Road: 1–0–0)

#	Date	Visitor	Score	Home	OT	Decision	Location	Attendance	Record
1^{A}	September 19	Vegas	4–2	Los Angeles		Forsberg	Toyota Arena	8,233	0–1–0
2	September 22	Utah	6–3	Los Angeles		Kuemper	Crypto.com Arena	10,191	0–2–0
3	September 23	Los Angeles	2–1	Anaheim		Forsberg	Honda Center	14,696	1–2–0
4	September 26	Anaheim	2–6	Los Angeles		Kuemper	Crypto.com Arena	12,995	2–2–0

Legend: Win Loss Overtime/shootout loss ^{A} – Game played in Ontario, California

=== Regular season ===
The Los Angeles Kings regular season schedule was released on July 16, 2026.

2026–27 game log: 5–10–2 (Home: 2–7–0; Road: 3–3–2)
September: 0–1–0 (Home: 0–0–0; Road: 0–1–0)

#	Date	Visitor	Score	Home	OT	Decision	Location	Attendance	Record	Points	Recap
1	September 30	Los Angeles	4–8	Colorado		Kuemper	Ball Arena	18,092	0–1–0	0	

October: 4–6–2 (Home: 1–4–0; Road: 3–2–2)

#	Date	Visitor	Score	Home	OT	Decision	Location	Attendance	Record	Points	Recap
2	October 3	Los Angeles	4–5	San Jose	OT	Forsberg	SAP Center	17,435	0–1–1	1	
3	October 6	Florida	2–1	Los Angeles		Kuemper	Crypto.com Arena	18,145	0–2–1	1	
4	October 10	Los Angeles	1–2	Vegas	OT	Kuemper	T-Mobile Arena	16,768	0–2–2	2	
5	October 13	Edmonton	4–1	Los Angeles		Kuemper	Crypto.com Arena	16,192	0–3–2	2	
6	October 17	Boston	4–1	Los Angeles		Forsberg	Crypto.com Arena	18,145	0–4–2	2	
7	October 20	Los Angeles	5–2	Washington		Kuemper	Capital One Arena	16,182	1–4–2	4	
8	October 22	Los Angeles	3–2	NY Islanders	OT	Kuemper	UBS Arena	14,397	2–4–2	6	
9	October 24	Los Angeles	1–3	New Jersey		Forsberg	Prudential Center	16,019	2–5–2	6	
10	October 26	Los Angeles	6–3	NY Rangers		Kuemper	Madison Square Garden	18,006	3–5–2	8	
11	October 27	Los Angeles	1–2	Chicago		Forsberg	United Center	16,437	3–6–2	8	
12	October 29	Ottawa	5–6	Los Angeles	OT	Kuemper	Crypto.com Arena	15,856	4–6–2	10	
13	October 31	Buffalo	3–2	Los Angeles		Forsberg	Crypto.com Arena	16,161	4–7–2	10	

November: 2–4–0 (Home: 1–4–0; Road: 1–0–0)

#	Date	Visitor	Score	Home	OT	Decision	Location	Attendance	Record	Points	Recap
14	November 4	San Jose	2–7	Los Angeles		Kuemper	Crypto.com Arena	17,010	5–7–2	12	
15	November 7	Pittsburgh	5–2	Los Angeles		Kuemper	Crypto.com Arena	18,145	5–8–2	12	
16	November 10	Nashville	3–0	Los Angeles		Forsberg	Crypto.com Arena	15,008	5–9–2	12	
17	November 12	NY Islanders	5–2	Los Angeles		Kuemper	Crypto.com Arena	15,622	5–10–2	12	
18	November 14	Calgary	3–2	Los Angeles		Forsberg	Crypto.com Arena	16,880	5–11–2	12	
19	November 17	Los Angeles	3–0	Boston		Kuemper	TD Garden	17,850	6–11–2	14	
20	November 19	Los Angeles	4–3	Toronto	OT	Kuemper	Scotiabank Arena	18,641	7–11–2	16	
21	November 21	Los Angeles	–	Ottawa			Canadian Tire Centre				
22	November 23	Los Angeles	–	Montreal			Bell Centre				
23	November 27	Los Angeles	–	Anaheim			Honda Center				
24	November 28	Anaheim	–	Los Angeles			Crypto.com Arena				

December: 0–0–0 (Home: 0–0–0; Road: 0–0–0)

#	Date	Visitor	Score	Home	OT	Decision	Location	Attendance	Record	Points	Recap
25	December 1	Vegas	–	Los Angeles			Crypto.com Arena				
26	December 3	Minnesota	–	Los Angeles			Crypto.com Arena				
27	December 5	Utah	–	Los Angeles			Crypto.com Arena				
28	December 9	San Jose	–	Los Angeles			Crypto.com Arena				
29	December 11	Los Angeles	–	San Jose			SAP Center				
30	December 12	Vancouver	–	Los Angeles			Crypto.com Arena				
31	December 15	Los Angeles	–	Detroit			Little Caesars Arena				
32	December 17	Los Angeles	–	Pittsburgh			PPG Paints Arena				
33	December 19	Los Angeles	–	Columbus			Nationwide Arena				
34	December 20	Los Angeles	–	Buffalo			KeyBank Center				
35	December 22	Los Angeles	–	Minnesota			Grand Casino Arena				
36	December 26	Utah	–	Los Angeles			Crypto.com Arena				
37	December 28	Los Angeles	–	Vancouver			Rogers Arena				
38	December 30	Toronto	–	Los Angeles			Crypto.com Arena				

January: 0–0–0 (Home: 0–0–0; Road: 0–0–0)

#	Date	Visitor	Score	Home	OT	Decision	Location	Attendance	Record	Points	Recap
39	January 2	New Jersey	–	Los Angeles			Crypto.com Arena				
40	January 4	Philadelphia	–	Los Angeles			Crypto.com Arena				
41	January 6	Washington	–	Los Angeles			Crypto.com Arena				
42	January 9	Dallas	–	Los Angeles			Crypto.com Arena				
43	January 11	NY Rangers	–	Los Angeles			Crypto.com Arena				
44	January 13	St. Louis	–	Los Angeles			Crypto.com Arena				
45	January 15	Los Angeles	–	Utah			Delta Center				
46	January 16	Los Angeles	–	Calgary			Scotiabank Saddledome				
47	January 19	Seattle	–	Los Angeles			Crypto.com Arena				
48	January 21	Edmonton	–	Los Angeles			Crypto.com Arena				
49	January 23	Los Angeles	–	Nashville			Bridgestone Arena				
50	January 24	Los Angeles	–	Florida			Amerant Bank Arena				
51	January 26	Los Angeles	–	Tampa Bay			Benchmark International Arena				
52	January 28	Los Angeles	–	Philadelphia			Xfinity Mobile Arena				
53	January 30	Los Angeles	–	Carolina			Lenovo Center				

February: 0–0–0 (Home: 0–0–0; Road: 0–0–0)

#	Date	Visitor	Score	Home	OT	Decision	Location	Attendance	Record	Points	Recap
54	February 8	Los Angeles	–	Dallas			American Airlines Center				
55	February 9	Los Angeles	–	St. Louis			Enterprise Center				
56	February 11	Detroit	–	Los Angeles			Crypto.com Arena				
57	February 13	Chicago	–	Los Angeles			Crypto.com Arena				
58	February 15	Calgary	–	Los Angeles			Crypto.com Arena				
59	February 17	Los Angeles	–	Winnipeg			Canada Life Centre				
60	February 18	Los Angeles	–	Minnesota			Grand Casino Arena				
61	February 20	Seattle	–	Los Angeles			Crypto.com Arena				
62	February 24	Montreal	–	Los Angeles			Crypto.com Arena				
63	February 26	Los Angeles	–	Chicago			United Center				
64	February 27	Los Angeles	–	Nashville			Bridgestone Arena				

March: 0–0–0 (Home: 0–0–0; Road: 0–0–0)

#	Date	Visitor	Score	Home	OT	Decision	Location	Attendance	Record	Points	Recap
65	March 1	Anaheim	–	Los Angeles			Crypto.com Arena				
66	March 3	Tampa Bay	–	Los Angeles			Crypto.com Arena				
67	March 5	Columbus	–	Los Angeles			Crypto.com Arena				
68	March 7	Colorado	–	Los Angeles			Crypto.com Arena				
69	March 9	Los Angeles	–	Edmonton			Rogers Place				
70	March 11	Los Angeles	–	Seattle			Climate Pledge Arena				
71	March 13	Dallas	–	Los Angeles			Crypto.com Arena				
72	March 16	Winnipeg	–	Los Angeles			Crypto.com Arena				
73	March 18	Carolina	–	Los Angeles			Crypto.com Arena				
74	March 21	Los Angeles	–	Seattle			Climate Pledge Arena				
75	March 23	Los Angeles	–	Vancouver			Rogers Arena				
76	March 25	Los Angeles	–	Calgary			Scotiabank Saddledome				
77	March 27	Los Angeles	–	Edmonton			Rogers Place				
78	March 29	Vancouver	–	Los Angeles			Crypto.com Arena				
79	March 31	Winnipeg	–	Los Angeles			Crypto.com Arena				

April: 0–0–0 (Home: 0–0–0; Road: 0–0–0)

#	Date	Visitor	Score	Home	OT	Decision	Location	Attendance	Record	Points	Recap
80	April 2	Los Angeles	–	Colorado			Ball Arena				
81	April 3	St. Louis	–	Los Angeles			Crypto.com Arena				
82	April 6	Los Angeles	–	Anaheim			Honda Center				
83	April 8	Vegas	–	Los Angeles			Crypto.com Arena				
84	April 10	Los Angeles	–	Vegas			T-Mobile Arena				

Legend: Win Loss Overtime/shootout loss

== Roster ==
Updated November 2, 2026

No.	Nat	Player	Pos	S/G	Age	Acquired	Birthplace
44	(United States)	Mikey Anderson (A)	D	L	27	2017	Fridley, Minnesota
40	(Finland)	Joel Armia	RW	R	33	2025	Pori, Finland
55	(Canada)	Quinton Byfield	C	L	24	2020	Newmarket, Ontario
5	(Canada)	Cody Ceci	D	R	32	2025	Ottawa, Ontario
42	(Slovakia)	Martin Chromiak	RW	R	24	2020	Ilava, Slovakia
92	(Canada)	Brandt Clarke	D	R	23	2021	Nepean, Ontario
8	(Canada)	Drew Doughty (C)	D	R	36	2008	London, Ontario
2	(United States)	Brian Dumoulin	D	L	35	2025	Biddeford, Maine
6	(Canada)	Joel Edmundson	D	L	33	2023	Brandon, Manitoba
22	(Switzerland)	Kevin Fiala	RW	L	30	2022	St. Gallen, Switzerland
31	(Sweden)	Anton Forsberg	G	L	33	2025	Härnösand, Sweden
64	(Sweden)	Erik Gustafsson	D	L	34	2026	Nynäshamn, Sweden
56	(Finland)	Erik Haula	LW	L	35	2026	Pori, Finland
79	(Finland)	Samuel Helenius	C	L	23	2021	Dallas, Texas
9	(Sweden)	Adrian Kempe (A)	LW	L	30	2014	Kramfors, Sweden
35	(Canada)	Darcy Kuemper	G	L	36	2024	Saskatoon, Saskatchewan
14	(United States)	Alex Laferriere	RW	R	25	2020	Chatham, New Jersey
21	(Canada)	Scott Laughton	C	L	32	2026	Oakville, Ontario
47	(Sweden)	Andre Lee	LW	L	26	2019	Karlstad, Sweden
12	(United States)	Trevor Moore	LW	L	31	2020	Thousand Oaks, California
10	(Russia)	Artemi Panarin (A)	LW	R	35	2026	Korkino, Soviet Union
90	(Canada)	Corey Perry	RW	R	41	2026	Peterborough, Ontario
15	(United States)	Alex Turcotte	C	L	25	2019	Elk Grove, Illinois
36	(Norway)	Mats Zuccarello	RW	L	39	2026	Oslo, Norway

== Player statistics ==
=== Goaltenders ===
^{†}Denotes player spent time with another team before joining the Kings.
^{‡}Denotes player was traded mid-season. Stats reflect time with the Kings only.
Bold/italics denotes franchise record.

== Awards and honours ==
=== Trades ===
Date	Details	Ref

=== Players acquired ===
Date	Player	Former team	Term	Via	Ref
July 1, 2026	Erik Haula	Nashville Predators	2 years	Free agency	
July 1, 2026	Mats Zuccarello	Minnesota Wild	1 year	Free agency	
July 1, 2026	Corey Perry	Tampa Bay Lightning	1 year	Free agency	
July 1, 2026	Scott Perunovich	Utah Mammoth	1 year	Free agency	
July 1, 2026	Lane Pederson	Philadelphia Flyers	1 year	Free agency	
July 1, 2026	Erik Gustafsson	Detroit Red Wings	1 year	Free agency	

=== Players lost ===
Date	Player	New team	Term	Via	Ref
July 1, 2026	Pheonix Copley	Columbus Blue Jackets	1 year	Free agency	
July 1, 2026	Andrei Kuzmenko	Pittsburgh Penguins	1 year	Free agency	
July 1, 2026	Jeff Malott	Anaheim Ducks	3 years	Free agency	
July 1, 2026	Glenn Gawdin	New York Rangers	2 years	Free agency	
July 1, 2026	Mathieu Joseph	Edmonton Oilers	1 year	Free agency	
July 6, 2026	Kyle Burroughs	Dallas Stars	1 year	Free agency	

=== Signings ===
Date	Player	Term	Ref
July 1, 2026	Erik Haula	2 years	
July 1, 2026	Mats Zuccarello	1 year	
July 1, 2026	Corey Perry	1 year	
July 1, 2026	Scott Perunovich	1 year	
July 1, 2026	Lane Pederson	1 year	
July 1, 2026	Erik Gustafsson	1 year	

== Draft picks ==
Below are the Los Angeles Kings selections at the 2026 NHL entry draft, which was held on June 26 and 27, 2026, at the KeyBank Center in Buffalo, New York.

Round	#	Player	Pos	Nationality	College/Junior/Club team	League
1	19 (Note: The Utah Mammoth's first-round pick went to the Kings as the result of a trade on June 26, 2026, that sent the Kings' first-round pick in 2026, 17th overall, to Utah in exchange for Utah's first-round pick in 2026, 19th overall, and a third-round pick in 2026, 83rd overall.)	Elton Hermansson	RW	Sweden	Modo Hockey	HockeyAllsvenskan
2	46 (Note: The Columbus Blue Jackets' second-round pick went to the Kings as the result of a trade on December 19, 2025, that sent Phillip Danault to Montreal in exchange for this pick. Montreal previously acquired this pick as the result of a trade on August 19, 2024, that sent Jordan Harris to Columbus in exchange for Patrik Laine and this pick.)	Liam Lefebvre	C	Canada	Chicoutimi Saguenéens	QMJHL
2	49	Adam Goljer	D	Slovakia	HK Dukla Trencin	Slovak Extraliga
3	80 (Note: The Washington Capitals' third-round pick went to the Kings as the result of a trade on March 5, 2026, that sent Warren Foegele and a conditional third-round pick in 2026 to the Ottawa Senators in exchange for a second-round pick in 2026 and this pick, which was conditional at the time of the trade. The condition, that Los Angeles would receive the better of Ottawa or Washington's third-round picks in 2026, was converted on April 13, 2026, when Washington was eliminated from playoff contention after Ottawa had already qualified for the 2026 Stanley Cup playoffs. Ottawa previously acquired this pick as the result of a trade on July 1, 2024, that sent Jakob Chychrun to Washington in exchange for Nick Jensen and this pick.)	Blake Zielinski	C	United States	Des Moines Buccaneers	USHL
3	89 (Note: The Minnesota Wild's third-round pick went to the Kings as the result of a trade on June 27, 2026, that sent Utah's 2026 third-round pick, 83rd overall, and a 2026 fifth-round pick, 153rd overall, to Minnesota in exchange for this pick.)	Yegor Rybkin	G	Russia	Chaika Nizhny Novgorod	MHL
4	103 (Note: The Winnipeg Jets' fourth-round pick went to the Kings as the result of a trade on June 27, 2026, that sent a 2026 fourth-round pick, 113th overall, and a 2026 sixth-round pick, 190th overall, to Montreal in exchange for this pick. Montreal previously acquired this pick as the result of a trade on June 30, 2024, that sent Johnathan Kovacevic to the New Jersey Devils in exchange for this pick, which was conditional at the time of the trade. The condition, that Montreal would receive the best of Dallas', Winnipeg's, or New Jersey's fourth-round picks in 2026, was converted when Winnipeg completed the season with the fewest standings points of the three teams. New Jersey previously acquired this pick as the result of a trade on March 8, 2024, that sent Colin Miller to Winnipeg in exchange for this pick.)	Thomas Vandenberg	C	Canada	Ottawa 67's	OHL
5	145	Vertti Svensk	D	Finland	SaiPa	Liiga
5	153 (Note: The Minnesota Wild's fifth-round pick went to the Kings as the result of a trade on June 27, 2026, that sent a 2026 third-round pick, 83rd overall, to Minnesota in exchange for a 2026 third-round pick, 89th overall, and this pick.)	Giorgois Pantelas	D	Canada	Brandon Wheat Kings	WHL
6	177	Alex Kostov	RW	Canada	Flint Firebirds	OHL
7	209	Tobias Krestan	RW	Germany	HV71	J20 Nationell
7	223 (Note: The Vegas Golden Knights' seventh-round pick went to the Kings as the result of a trade on June 27, 2026, that sent a 2027 seventh-round pick to Montreal in exchange for this pick. Montreal previously acquired this pick as the result of a trade on June 27, 2026, that sent a 2026 fourth-round pick, 113th overall, to Vegas in exchange for a 2026 fourth-round pick, 117th overall, and this pick.)	Lucas Ambrosio	D	Canada	Erie Otters	OHL
