= 2026–27 New Jersey Devils season =

National Hockey League season

2026–27 New Jersey Devils
- Division: Metropolitan
- Conference: Eastern
- 2026–27 record: 15–7–0
- Home record: 9–3–0
- Road record: 6–4–0
- Goals for: 82
- Goals against: 64

Team information
- General manager: Sunny Mehta
- Coach: Sheldon Keefe
- Captain: Nico Hischier
- Alternate captains: Jesper Bratt; Jack Hughes
- Arena: Prudential Center
- Minor league affiliates: Utica Comets (AHL); Adirondack Thunder (ECHL)

Team leaders
- Goals: Jack Hughes (10)
- Assists: Jesper Bratt (18)
- Points: Jack Hughes (27)
- Penalty minutes: Timo Meier (29)
- Plus/minus: Brett Pesce (+16)
- Wins: Connor Hellebuyck (7)
- Goals against average: Connor Hellebuyck (2.36)

The 2026–27 New Jersey Devils season is the 53rd season for the National Hockey League (NHL) franchise that was established on June 11, 1974, and 45th season since the franchise relocated from Colorado prior to the 1982–83 NHL season.

== Standings ==
=== Divisional standings ===
Metropolitan Division
Pos	Team	GP	W	L	OTL	RW	GF	GA	GD	Pts
1	Carolina Hurricanes	21	16	3	2	15	87	47	+40	34
2	New Jersey Devils	22	15	7	0	10	82	64	+18	30
3	New York Rangers	22	13	8	1	13	67	58	+9	27
4	New York Islanders	20	10	6	4	8	65	57	+8	24
5	Washington Capitals	19	10	9	0	8	64	70	−6	20
6	Philadelphia Flyers	24	7	11	6	7	57	80	−23	20
7	Pittsburgh Penguins	20	7	11	2	3	62	71	−9	16
8	Columbus Blue Jackets	19	7	12	0	2	46	63	−17	14

Updated to game(s) played on November 18, 2026. Source: National Hockey League
Rules for classification: 1) Fewer number of games played (GP, only during regular season); 2) Greater number of regulation wins (RW); 3) Greater number of wins in regulation and overtime, excluding shootout wins (ROW); 4) Greater number of total wins, including shootouts (W); 5) Greater number of points earned in head-to-head play; if teams played an uneven number of head-to-head games, the result of the first game on the home ice of the team with the extra home game is discarded; 6) Greater goal differential (GD); 7) Greater number of goals scored (GF)

=== Conference standings ===
Eastern Conference Wild Card
Pos	Div	Team	GP	W	L	OTL	RW	GF	GA	GD	Pts
1	AT	Boston Bruins	22	14	7	1	11	76	56	+20	29
2	AT	Florida Panthers	23	12	8	3	10	72	68	+4	27
3	ME	New York Islanders	20	10	6	4	8	65	57	+8	24
4	ME	Washington Capitals	19	10	9	0	8	64	70	−6	20
5	AT	Buffalo Sabres	21	8	9	4	6	58	74	−16	20
6	ME	Philadelphia Flyers	24	7	11	6	7	57	80	−23	20
7	AT	Detroit Red Wings	22	8	11	3	6	58	68	−10	19
8	AT	Toronto Maple Leafs	23	8	13	2	7	72	82	−10	18
9	ME	Pittsburgh Penguins	20	7	11	2	3	62	71	−9	16
10	ME	Columbus Blue Jackets	19	7	12	0	2	46	63	−17	14

Updated to game(s) played on November 18, 2026. Source: National Hockey League
Rules for classification: 1) Fewer number of games played (GP, only during regular season); 2) Greater number of regulation wins (RW); 3) Greater number of wins in regulation and overtime, excluding shootout wins (ROW); 4) Greater number of total wins, including shootouts (W); 5) Greater number of points earned in head-to-head play; if teams played an uneven number of head-to-head games, the result of the first game on the home ice of the team with the extra home game is discarded; 6) Greater goal differential (GD); 7) Greater number of goals scored (GF)

== Schedule and results ==
=== Preseason ===
The preseason schedule was published on June 24, 2026.

2026 preseason game log: 3–0–1 (home: 2–0–0; road: 1–0–1)
#	Date	Visitor	Score	Home	OT	Decision	Attendance	Record	Recap
1	September 20	NY Islanders	1–2	New Jersey		Rittich	10,226	1–0–0
2	September 21	NY Rangers	2–3	New Jersey		Daws	11,156	2–0–0
3	September 24	New Jersey	2–3	NY Rangers	SO	Daws	16,078	2–0–1
4	September 26	New Jersey	4–1	NY Islanders		Allen	9,777	3–0–1

=== Regular season ===
The regular season schedule was released on July 16, 2026.

2026–27 game log

October: 9–5–0 (home: 6–2–0; road: 3–3–0)
#	Date	Visitor	Score	Home	OT	Decision	Attendance	Record	Pts	Recap
1	October 1	Philadelphia	2–3	New Jersey	OT	Allen	16,539	1–0–0	2
2	October 3	New Jersey	0–6	NY Islanders		Daws	17,345	1–1–0	2
3	October 6	Utah	5–3	New Jersey		Allen	15,146	1–2–0	2
4	October 10	Vancouver	1–4	New Jersey		Allen	15,929	2–2–0	4
5	October 12	Ottawa	4–1	New Jersey		Daws	15,085	2–3–0	4
6	October 13	New Jersey	5–4	Detroit	OT	Allen	18,306	3–3–0	6
7	October 15	NY Rangers	1–7	New Jersey		Daws	16,527	4–3–0	8
8	October 17	New Jersey	2–4	Washington		Allen	16,834	4–4–0	8
9	October 20	Colorado	3–4	New Jersey		Allen	15,360	5–4–0	10
10	October 22	Anaheim	1–4	New Jersey		Daws	16,049	6–4–0	12
11	October 24	Los Angeles	1–3	New Jersey		Allen	16,019	7–4–0	14
12	October 27	New Jersey	5–1	Dallas		Hellebuyck	18,532	8–4–0	16
13	October 28	New Jersey	2–5	Colorado		Allen	18,101	8–5–0	16
14	October 30	New Jersey	5–2	Vegas		Hellebuyck	17,615	9–5–0	18

November: 6–2–0 (home: 3–1–0; road: 3–1–0)
#	Date	Visitor	Score	Home	OT	Decision	Attendance	Record	Pts	Recap
15	November 3	Edmonton	3–4	New Jersey	SO	Hellebuyck	16,514	10–5–0	20
16	November 5	St. Louis	4–5	New Jersey	OT	Hellebuyck	16,514	11–5–0	22
17	November 7	New Jersey	5–4	NY Islanders	OT	Allen	17,345	12–5–0	24
18	November 8	New Jersey	4–0	Toronto		Hellebuyck	18,811	13–5–0	26
19	November 10	New Jersey	2–4	Winnipeg		Allen	15,209	13–6–0	26
20	November 12	Washington	2–5	New Jersey		Hellebuyck	15,035	14–6–0	28
21	November 14	New Jersey	7–4	Washington		Hellebuyck	18,347	15–6–0	30
22	November 18	Montreal	3–2	New Jersey		Hellebuyck	16,514	15–7–0	30
23	November 21	New Jersey		St. Louis
24	November 23	Columbus		New Jersey
25	November 25	New Jersey		Columbus
26	November 27	Calgary		New Jersey
27	November 28	Winnipeg		New Jersey

December: 0–0–0 (home: 0–0–0; road: 0–0–0)
#	Date	Visitor	Score	Home	OT	Decision	Attendance	Record	Pts	Recap
28	December 1	San Jose		New Jersey
29	December 3	New Jersey		Ottawa
30	December 5	New Jersey		Pittsburgh
31	December 7	New Jersey		NY Rangers
32	December 9	Detroit		New Jersey
33	December 12	New Jersey		Boston
34	December 15	NY Rangers		New Jersey
35	December 17	Toronto		New Jersey
36	December 19	Boston		New Jersey
37	December 20	Nashville		New Jersey
38	December 22	New Jersey		NY Rangers
39	December 26	New Jersey		Buffalo
40	December 27	Boston		New Jersey
41	December 29	New Jersey		Utah

January: 0–0–0 (home: 0–0–0; road: 0–0–0)
#	Date	Visitor	Score	Home	OT	Decision	Attendance	Record	Pts	Recap
42	January 1	New Jersey		Anaheim
43	January 2	New Jersey		Los Angeles
44	January 4	New Jersey		San Jose
45	January 7	Columbus		New Jersey
46	January 9	Chicago		New Jersey
47	January 12	New Jersey		Buffalo
48	January 13	New Jersey		Montreal
49	January 16	NY Islanders		New Jersey
50	January 19	Dallas		New Jersey
51	January 21	Tampa Bay		New Jersey
52	January 23	New Jersey		Philadelphia
53	January 24	Washington		New Jersey
54	January 26	Seattle		New Jersey
55	January 28	New Jersey		Edmonton
56	January 30	New Jersey		Calgary
57	January 31	New Jersey		Seattle

February: 0–0–0 (home: 0–0–0; road: 0–0–0)
#	Date	Visitor	Score	Home	OT	Decision	Attendance	Record	Pts	Recap
58	February 3	New Jersey		Vancouver
59	February 13	New Jersey		Philadelphia
60	February 16	New Jersey		Nashville
61	February 18	New Jersey		Florida
62	February 20	Buffalo		New Jersey
63	February 21	New Jersey		Chicago
64	February 23	Carolina		New Jersey
65	February 26	New Jersey		Columbus
66	February 28	New Jersey		Minnesota

March: 0–0–0 (home: 0–0–0; road: 0–0–0)
#	Date	Visitor	Score	Home	OT	Decision	Attendance	Record	Pts	Recap
67	March 2	Ottawa		New Jersey
68	March 4	New Jersey		Detroit
69	March 5	Vegas		New Jersey
70	March 9	New Jersey		Florida
71	March 11	New Jersey		Tampa Bay
72	March 13	New Jersey		Carolina
73	March 18	Pittsburgh		New Jersey
74	March 20	Toronto		New Jersey
75	March 23	Philadelphia		New Jersey
76	March 25	New Jersey		Pittsburgh
77	March 27	New Jersey		Montreal
78	March 29	Carolina		New Jersey
79	March 31	Minnesota		New Jersey

April: 0–0–0 (home: 0–0–0; road: 0–0–0)
#	Date	Visitor	Score	Home	OT	Decision	Attendance	Record	Pts	Recap
80	April 3	New Jersey		Carolina
81	April 4	Florida		New Jersey
82	April 6	Tampa Bay		New Jersey
83	April 8	NY Islanders		New Jersey
84	April 10	Pittsburgh		New Jersey

Legend: Win (2 points) Loss (0 points) Overtime/shootout loss (1 point)

== Roster ==
Updated November 13, 2026

No.	Nat	Player	Pos	S/G	Age	Acquired	Birthplace
34	(Canada)	Jake Allen	G	L	36	2024	Fredericton, New Brunswick
70	(Sweden)	Jesper Boqvist	C	L	28	2026	Falun, Sweden
63	(Sweden)	Jesper Bratt (A)	LW	L	28	2017	Stockholm, Sweden
16	(Canada)	Connor Brown	RW	R	32	2025	Etobicoke, Ontario
24	(United States)	Seamus Casey	D	R	22	2022	Miami, Florida
47	(Canada)	Declan Chisholm	D	L	26	2026	Bowmanville, Ontario
5	(Canada)	Brenden Dillon	D	L	36	2024	Surrey, British Columbia
77	(Canada)	Luke Evangelista	RW	R	24	2026	Oakville, Ontario
12	(Canada)	Cody Glass	C	R	27	2025	Winnipeg, Manitoba
81	(Russia)	Arseni Gritsyuk	RW	L	25	2019	Krasnoyarsk, Russia
29	(Finland)	Lenni Hämeenaho	RW	R	22	2023	Kajaani, Finland
7	(Canada)	Dougie Hamilton	D	R	33	2021	Toronto, Ontario
37	(United States)	Connor Hellebuyck	G	L	33	2026	Commerce, Michigan
13	(Switzerland)	Nico Hischier (C)	C	L	27	2017	Brig, Switzerland
86	(United States)	Jack Hughes (A)	C	L	25	2019	Orlando, Florida
43	(United States)	Luke Hughes	D	L	23	2021	Manchester, New Hampshire
8	(Canada)	Johnathan Kovacevic	D	R	29	2024	Hamilton, Ontario
18	(Belarus)	Vladislav Kolyachonok	D	L	25	2026	Minsk, Belarus
93	(Canada)	Amadeus Lombardi	C	L	23	2026	Newmarket, Ontario
39	(Canada)	Anthony Mantha	RW	L	32	2026	Longueuil, Quebec
28	(Switzerland)	Timo Meier	RW	L	30	2023	Herisau, Switzerland
11	(United States)	Stefan Noesen	RW	R	33	2024	Plano, Texas
22	(United States)	Brett Pesce	D	R	32	2024	Tarrytown, New York
17	(Canada)	Evan Rodrigues	C	R	33	2026	Toronto, Ontario
71	(Switzerland)	Jonas Siegenthaler	D	L	29	2021	Zürich, Switzerland
52	(Russia)	Anton Silayev	D	L	20	2024	Sarov, Russia

== Player statistics ==
=== Skaters ===
Regular season
Player	GP	G	A	Pts	+/−	PIM

=== Goaltenders ===
Regular season
Player	GP	GS	TOI	W	L	OT	GA	GAA	SA	SV%	SO	G	A	PIM

^{†} Denotes player spent time with another team before joining the Devils. Stats reflect time with the Devils only.

- ^{‡} Denotes player was traded mid-season. Stats reflect time with the Devils only.
- Bold/italics denotes franchise record.

== Transactions ==
The Devils have been involved in the following transactions during the 2026–27 season.

=== Trades ===
Date	Details		Ref
September 1, 2026	To Nashville Predators conditional (Note: Nashville will receive Colorado's first-round pick in 2028 if the pick is outside of the top ten selections and Colorado owns the pick at the time of the draft. Otherwise, Nashville will receive Colorado's first-round pick in 2029.) COL 1st-round pick in 2028 or COL 1st-round pick in 2029; 2nd-round pick in 2028	To New Jersey Devils Luke Evangelista	
October 23, 2026	To Winnipeg Jets Dawson Mercer; Nico Daws; Nick Bjugstad; Alexander Command; 7th-round pick in 2027; 2nd-round pick in 2029	To New Jersey Devils Connor Hellebuyck	
November 1, 2026	To New Jersey Devils 7th-round pick in 2027	To Washington Capitals Rémi Poirier	

=== Free agents ===
Date	Player	Team	Contract term	Ref
July 1, 2026	Vladislav Kolyachonok	from Dallas Stars	1-year	
July 1, 2026	Riley Tufte	from Boston Bruins	1-year	
July 1, 2026	Paul Cotter	to Vancouver Canucks	1-year	
July 1, 2026	Zack MacEwen	to Toronto Maple Leafs	2-year	
July 1, 2026	Brian Halonen	to Boston Bruins	2-year	
July 2, 2026	Dennis Cholowski	to New York Rangers	2-year	
July 2, 2026	David Rittich	from New York Islanders	1-year	
July 6, 2026	Colton White	to Columbus Blue Jackets	2-year	
July 15, 2026	Anthony Mantha	from Pittsburgh Penguins	2-year	
July 30, 2026	Colin White	from San Jose Sharks	1-year	

=== Offer sheets ===
Date offered	Player	Original team	Contract offered	Date resolved	Result	Ref
July 1, 2026	Barrett Hayton	Utah Mammoth	1-year, $4,775,000	July 8, 2026	Matched	

=== Waivers ===
Date	Player	Team	Ref

=== Signings ===
Date	Player	Contract term	Ref
June 30, 2026	Arseny Gritsyuk	3-year	
July 1, 2026	Nico Hischier	5-year extension	
July 1, 2026	Nico Daws	2-year	
July 1, 2026	Xavier Parent	1-year	
July 1, 2026	Marc McLaughlin	1-year	
July 3, 2026	Amadeus Lombardi	2-year	
July 6, 2026	Jakub Málek	2-year	
July 6, 2026	Ben Steeves	1-year	
July 29, 2026	Topias Vilén	1-year	

== Draft picks ==
Below are the New Jersey Devils selections at the 2026 NHL entry draft, which was held on June 26 and 27, 2026, at the KeyBank Center in Buffalo, New York.

Round	#	Player	Pos	Nationality	College/Junior/Club team (League)
1	12	Alexander Command	C	Sweden	Orebro HK (SHL)
2	37	Matias Vanhanen	LW	Finland	Everett Silvertips (WHL)
2	44	Nikita Shcherbakov	D	Russia	Salavat Yulaev Ufa (KHL)
4	119	Lavr Gashilov	C	Russia	JHC Atvo (MHL)
5	149	Daniil Rusakovich	G	Belarus	Dinamo-Shinnik Bobruysk (MHL)
6	172	Luke Wilfley	C	United States	Portland Winterhawks (WHL)
7	222	Quinn McKenzie	C	United States	Sault Ste. Marie Greyhounds (OHL)
