= Braeden Bowman =

Canadian ice hockey player (born 2003)

- Bowman with the Golden Knights in 2026
- Born: June 26, 2003 (age 23) Kitchener, Ontario, Canada
- Height: 6 ft 2 in (188 cm)
- Weight: 194 lb (88 kg; 13 st 12 lb)
- Position: Right wing
- Shoots: Right
- NHL team: Vegas Golden Knights
- NHL draft: Undrafted
- Playing career: 2024–present

Braeden Bowman (born June 26, 2003) is a Canadian professional ice hockey player who is a right winger for the Vegas Golden Knights of the National Hockey League (NHL).

== Playing career ==
After beginning in youth hockey in his hometown of Kitchener with the Jr. Rangers and Dutchmen, Bowman played major junior hockey with the Guelph Storm of the Ontario Hockey League (OHL), serving as captain in his final year with the team.

After attending development camp with the Vegas Golden Knights of the National Hockey League (NHL) in the summer of 2024, Bowman began his professional career in signing a one-year contract with Vegas' American Hockey League (AHL) affiliate, the Henderson Silver Knights, on July 9, 2024. In the midst of what would ultimately be a 14-goal, 36-point rookie campaign across 68 games played in the 2024–25 season, Bowman later signed a two-year entry-level contract with the Golden Knights on March 2, 2025.

The following season, after posting 12 points in his first 12 games with Henderson, Bowman was recalled to Vegas' roster on November 12, 2025, due to an injury to William Karlsson. He subsequently made his NHL debut on November 13, registering 4 shots in a 4–3 overtime loss to the New York Islanders. Two nights later, on November 15, Bowman scored his first NHL goal against Joel Hofer of the St. Louis Blues, which would ultimately be the game-winning goal in a 4–1 Golden Knights victory. This goal marked the beginning of a scoring streak for Bowman, as he proceeded to score three more goals and his first NHL assist in his next four games, for a total of five points through his first six NHL games; he also posted a five-game point streak from his third through eighth games, becoming the first undrafted rookie to post such a streak since Taro Hirose in the 2018–19 season. After 54 games with Vegas during the season, Bowman was sent back down to the AHL on April 1, 2026. Following an injury to Mark Stone, Bowman was recalled to Vegas' main roster on May 12, during the Stanley Cup playoffs. Bowman subsequently made his playoff debut a month later on June 14, playing on the fourth line for Vegas' 3–0 Game 6 loss in the 2026 Stanley Cup Final.

On September 10, 2026, Bowman signed a six-year extension with the Golden Knights, keeping him with the franchise through the 2032–33 season.

== Career statistics ==
			Regular season					Playoffs
Season	Team	League	GP	G	A	Pts	PIM	GP	G	A	Pts	PIM
2019–20	Kitchener Dutchmen	GOJHL	50	24	20	44	44	6	4	3	7	6
2019–20	Guelph Storm	OHL	2	0	0	0	0	—	—	—	—	—
2021–22	Guelph Storm	OHL	60	27	10	37	18	5	0	2	2	0
2022–23	Guelph Storm	OHL	54	33	39	72	28	6	0	3	3	7
2023–24	Guelph Storm	OHL	68	37	34	71	51	2	0	1	1	0
2024–25	Henderson Silver Knights	AHL	68	14	22	36	12	—	—	—	—	—
2025–26	Henderson Silver Knights	AHL	20	12	14	26	6	6	2	2	4	2
2025–26	Vegas Golden Knights	NHL	54	8	18	26	12	1	0	0	0	0
NHL totals			54	8	18	24	12	1	0	0	0	0
