= Marc Gatcomb =

American ice hockey player (born 1999)

- Born: July 22, 1999 (age 27) Woburn, Massachusetts, U.S.
- Height: 6 ft 2 in (188 cm)
- Weight: 195 lb (88 kg; 13 st 13 lb)
- Position: Forward
- Shoots: Right
- NHL team Former teams: Vegas Golden Knights; New York Islanders
- NHL draft: Undrafted
- Playing career: 2022–present

Marc Gatcomb (born July 22, 1999) is an American professional ice hockey player who is a forward for the Vegas Golden Knights of the National Hockey League. An undrafted player, Gatcomb has also played in the NHL for the New York Islanders.

== Playing career ==
Gatcomb played collegiate hockey with the University of Connecticut in the Hockey East. Following the completion of his senior season with the Huskies in 2021–22, Gatcomb immediately turned professional after signing a contract to join the Abbotsford Canucks of the AHL on April 3, 2022.

Following his second full season with Abbotsford, Gatcomb was signed as an undrafted free agent to a one-year, two-way NHL contract with the New York Islanders on July 4, 2024. In the 2024–25 season, Gatcomb was initially re-assigned by New York to its AHL affiliate, the Bridgeport Islanders. At the mid-point of the season, Gatcomb was recalled by the Islanders and made his NHL debut in a regular season game against the Ottawa Senators on January 14, 2025.

As a pending restricted free agent, Gatcomb was not tendered a qualifying offer by the Islanders, ending his tenure with the club. As a free agent, Gatcomb was signed to a two-year, $1.75 million contract with the Vegas Golden Knights on July 1, 2026.

== Career statistics ==
			Regular season					Playoffs
Season	Team	League	GP	G	A	Pts	PIM	GP	G	A	Pts	PIM
2016–17	The Gunnery	USHS	32	13	13	26	6	—	—	—	—	—
2017–18	The Gunnery	USHS	31	14	13	27	8	—	—	—	—	—
2018–19	UConn	HE	31	1	0	1	4	—	—	—	—	—
2019–20	UConn	HE	34	7	5	12	18	—	—	—	—	—
2020–21	UConn	HE	23	6	6	12	14	—	—	—	—	—
2021–22	UConn	HE	36	8	13	21	14	—	—	—	—	—
2021–22	Abbotsford Canucks	AHL	6	0	0	0	2	—	—	—	—	—
2022–23	Abbotsford Canucks	AHL	45	3	5	8	24	6	1	0	1	2
2022–23	Kalamazoo Wings	ECHL	6	1	3	4	6	—	—	—	—	—
2023–24	Abbotsford Canucks	AHL	61	9	11	20	32	6	1	0	1	2
2024–25	Bridgeport Islanders	AHL	35	9	8	17	18	—	—	—	—	—
2024–25	New York Islanders	NHL	39	8	1	9	11	—	—	—	—	—
2025–26	New York Islanders	NHL	49	3	4	7	10	—	—	—	—	—
2025–26	Bridgeport Islanders	AHL	15	4	4	8	6	—	—	—	—	—
NHL totals			88	11	5	16	21	—	—	—	—	—
