= Major League Baseball on regional sports networks =

Some Major League Baseball games not broadcast exclusively by the league's national media partners are televised by regional sports networks (RSNs), which present sports programming of interest to their respective region. Some teams own partial or majority stakes in their RSN. As of the 2026 season, local telecasts for 14 of MLB's 30 clubs are produced and distributed by MLB Local Media, a department of the league, after their previous RSNs stopped carrying their games or shut down entirely; several other teams' games are available for local fans to stream on MLB.tv. Some RSNs also offer over-the-top media services to customers who would prefer to stream live game coverage.

Regionally broadcast MLB games are subject to blackouts; games from outside of a viewer's designated market are blacked out to protect the local team. In addition, certain national regular season telecasts on ESPN, FS1, and TBS are non-exclusive, and may also air in tandem with telecasts of the game by local broadcasters. National telecasts of these games may be blacked out in the participating teams' markets, to protect the local broadcaster.

== List ==
Regional network or group As of the 2026 MLB season	Team(s)
NBC Sports Regional Networks	Philadelphia, Sacramento, San Francisco
Fenway Sports Group (NESN, SportsNet Pittsburgh)	Boston, Pittsburgh
Angels Broadcast Television	Los Angeles Angels
BravesVision	Atlanta
Chicago Sports Network	Chicago White Sox
Detroit SportsNet	Detroit
Marquee Sports Network	Chicago Cubs
Mid-Atlantic Sports Network	Baltimore
Rangers Sports Network	Texas
Space City Home Network	Houston
Spectrum SportsNet LA	Los Angeles Dodgers
Sportsnet	Toronto
SportsNet New York	New York Mets
YES Network	New York Yankees
MLB Local Media Networks (Games distributed by MLB.tv or local stations)	Arizona, Cincinnati, Cleveland, Colorado, Kansas City, Miami, Milwaukee, Minnesota, St. Louis, San Diego, Seattle, Tampa Bay, Washington

== Online streaming of local games ==
Until 2020, all in-market streaming rights for each team were controlled by Major League Baseball.

For a period, the Yankees and Padres streamed their regional games online through subscription services, but as of the 2015 season, only the Toronto Blue Jays offered in-market streaming of their games to authenticated subscribers of the team's broadcaster within its designated market (Sportsnet also sells access to its networks, and these games, as an over-the-top subscription service). Regional games were not available on TV Everywhere services such as Fox Sports Go or the NBC Sports app, and in-market streaming is not available via MLB.tv because games are always blacked out for in-market teams.

Commissioner Rob Manfred stated in an April 2015 interview with the Wall Street Journal that MLB planned to finalize a plan to allow in-market streaming of regional games "some time this year". Major League Baseball and representatives of its regional broadcasters have attempted to negotiate how in-market streaming for U.S. teams would operate, including whether digital rights to regional games would be centralized and held by an exclusive partner, and whether local rightsholders would be able to distribute the telecasts through their own services and apps, or whether all in-market games would have to be offered through existing MLB apps. Providers objected to having in-market streaming be MLB-controlled, as they would gain access to users' credentials.

As of the 2016 Major League Baseball season, Fox reached a three-year deal to offer in-market streaming of its 15 teams to authenticated subscribers of the corresponding Fox Sports Networks. Fox pays a digital rights fee for each team, and the streams are managed by MLB Advanced Media but delivered through the existing Fox Sports Go applications. Wider adoption began to spread in the 2017 season, with NBC Sports Regional Networks and SportsNet New York (via the NBC Sports app), Root Sports (now AT&T SportsNet in most markets), and NESN launching in-market streaming of their local teams.

As of the 2020 season, MLB's owners voted unanimously to revert ownership of "certain in-market digital rights" to the teams themselves. Commissioner Manfred stated that digital streaming had become "substitutional with broadcast rights", and that these changes would allow teams more flexibility in selling their digital rights in the future. However, such arrangements may still be subject to negotiations with existing regional rightsholders.

== Games distributed by MLB ==
Since 2023, as a result of corporate decisions by companies that distribute MLB games, the league has begun to distribute games for some of its clubs directly to viewers.

Before the 2023 season, Diamond Sports Group, which operates the Bally Sports networks and which held the television rights to 14 of MLB's 30 clubs, filed for Chapter 11 bankruptcy protection, and Warner Bros. Discovery (WBD), which operated three AT&T SportsNet channels, announced that it would exit the RSN business. In response to the potential loss of broadcasters for 17 of its teams, the league created MLB Local Media, a new division, and hired Doug Johnson as senior vice president and executive producer of local media, Greg Pennell as senior VP of local media, and Kendall Burgess as VP of local media technical operations. Johnson had worked for AT&T SportsNet Pittsburgh. Pennell and Burgess were previously employees of Bally Sports.

On May 30, 2023, MLB announced that it would take over Padres broadcasts starting the following day, after Bally Sports San Diego failed to make payments to the team during a grace period. The Padres are the first team for which MLB produces all regional telecasts. On July 18, following Bally Sports Arizona's failure to make payments to the Arizona Diamondbacks on a similar grace period, MLB decided to take over production of regional telecasts of Diamondbacks games for the rest of the 2023 regular season.

In 2024, MLB took over broadcasts for the Colorado Rockies; including the Padres and Diamondbacks, the league distributed telecasts for three of its clubs. In 2025, MLB distributed broadcasts for five clubs, having adding the Cleveland Guardians and Minnesota Twins broadcasts to its local media department. In 2025, the Seattle Mariners' broadcasts were produced by MLB Local Media, but Root Sports Northwest continued to distribute the team's games via its own television channel and direct-to-consumer streaming service. After the season, the Mariners shut down Root Sports Northwest and moved to MLB Local Media starting in 2026. On January 14, 2026, the Washington Nationals became the seventh team to have its games produced by MLB after its broadcast agreement with MASN expired.

On February 2, 2026, Main Street Sports Group announced that FanDuel Sports Network would no longer show MLB games. The Cincinnati Reds, Kansas City Royals, Miami Marlins, Milwaukee Brewers, St. Louis Cardinals, and Tampa Bay Rays moved their broadcasts to MLB Local Media. The Reds and Brewers were initially slated to join MLB's local production in 2025, but re-signed with the rebranded FanDuel Sports Network for that season. The Detroit Tigers later announced a move to MLB Local Media as well. The Los Angeles Angels announced an arrangement to have MLB.tv stream in-market games under the name "Angels.tv", and later announced that they would buy all remaining shares in FanDuel Sports Network West, which they would continue to operate. The Atlanta Braves announced that they would broadcast their own games on BravesVision, a new broadcaster available on cable, satellite, streaming, and direct-to-consumer services, including via MLB.tv.

ESPN holds the in-market distribution rights for all clubs whose games are produced by MLB Local Media. During the 2026 season, these games are expected to be available on MLB's own streaming service, MLB.TV, before moving to ESPN's streaming service in the 2027 season.

== See also ==
- List of current Major League Baseball broadcasters
- Major League Baseball on television
