= BSS =

BSS may stand for:

== Computing and telecommunications ==
- .bss ("Block Started by Symbol"), in compilers and linkers
- Base station subsystem, in mobile telephone networks
- Basic Service Set, the basic building block of a wireless local area network (WLAN)
- Boeing Satellite Systems, see Boeing Satellite Development Center
- Blum–Shub–Smale machine, a model of computation
- Broadcasting Satellite Service, in television
- Business support system, components used by Telecom Service Providers

== Entertainment ==
- Best Selling Secrets, a sitcom
- BSS 01, a dedicated first-generation home video game console
- Brain Salad Surgery, a 1973 Emerson, Lake & Palmer album
- Brave Saint Saturn, an American Christian rock band
- Broken Social Scene, a Canadian indie rock band
- Buraka Som Sistema, an electronic dance music project from Portugal
- Beyond Scared Straight, an A&E television series based on the 1978 film Scared Straight!
- British Strong Style, a professional wrestling group
- BSS (band), also known as BooSeokSoon, a sub-unit of the K-pop group Seventeen
- BSS Jane Seymour, a video game

== Media ==
- Broadcasting System of San-in, Japan
- Bangladesh Sangbad Sangstha, the official news agency of Bangladesh
- Budavári Schönherz Stúdió, an online television and radio station of BUTE

== Medicine ==
- Bismuth subsalicylate, the active ingredient in several medications
- Bernard–Soulier syndrome, a bleeding disorder
- Bristol stool scale, a medical aid designed to classify the form of human faeces
- Balanced salt solution
- British Sleep Society, a charity that represents sleep health and sleep medicine

== Organizations ==
- Bevara Sverige Svenskt, a Swedish racist movement
- Biciklisticki Savez Srbije, the cycling federation of Serbia
- Botanical Society of Scotland, the national learning society for botanists of Scotland
- Bangladesh Sangbad Sangstha, the news agency of Bangladesh

== Schools ==
- Bayridge Secondary School, Canada
- Bayview Secondary School, Canada
- Beaconhouse School System, Pakistan
- Bishop Strachan School, Canada
- Blessed Sacrament School (disambiguation)
- Bramalea Secondary School, Canada
- Brighton Secondary School, Australia
- Bombay Scottish School, Mahim, India

== Other uses ==
- Bally Sports South, American regional sports network owned and operated by Bally Sports
- British Supersport Championship
- Bachelor of Social Science, an academic degree in social science awarded by a university
- Bang senseless, a gene of Drosophila melanogaster
- Basic Surgical Skills, a mandatory 3-day practical course provided by the Royal College of Surgeons for all trainee surgeons in the UK and Ireland
- Baudhayana Shrauta Sutra, a Hindu text
- Blind signal separation, a method for the separation of a set of signals in math and statistics
- Blue Shirts Society, a Chinese ultranationalist clique and secret police or para-military force in the Republic of China between 1931 and 1938
- Broad Street railway station (England)
- Broad Street Subway, alternative name for the Broad Street Line, a rapid transit line in Philadelphia
- BSS Industrial, a British group of companies in the engineering sector
