= Bishop McGuinness Catholic High School =

Bishop McGuinness Catholic High School may refer to:

- Bishop McGuinness Catholic High School (North Carolina), in Kernersville
- Bishop McGuinness Catholic High School (Oklahoma), in Oklahoma City
