= Brandon Gaudin =

American sports announcer (born 1983)

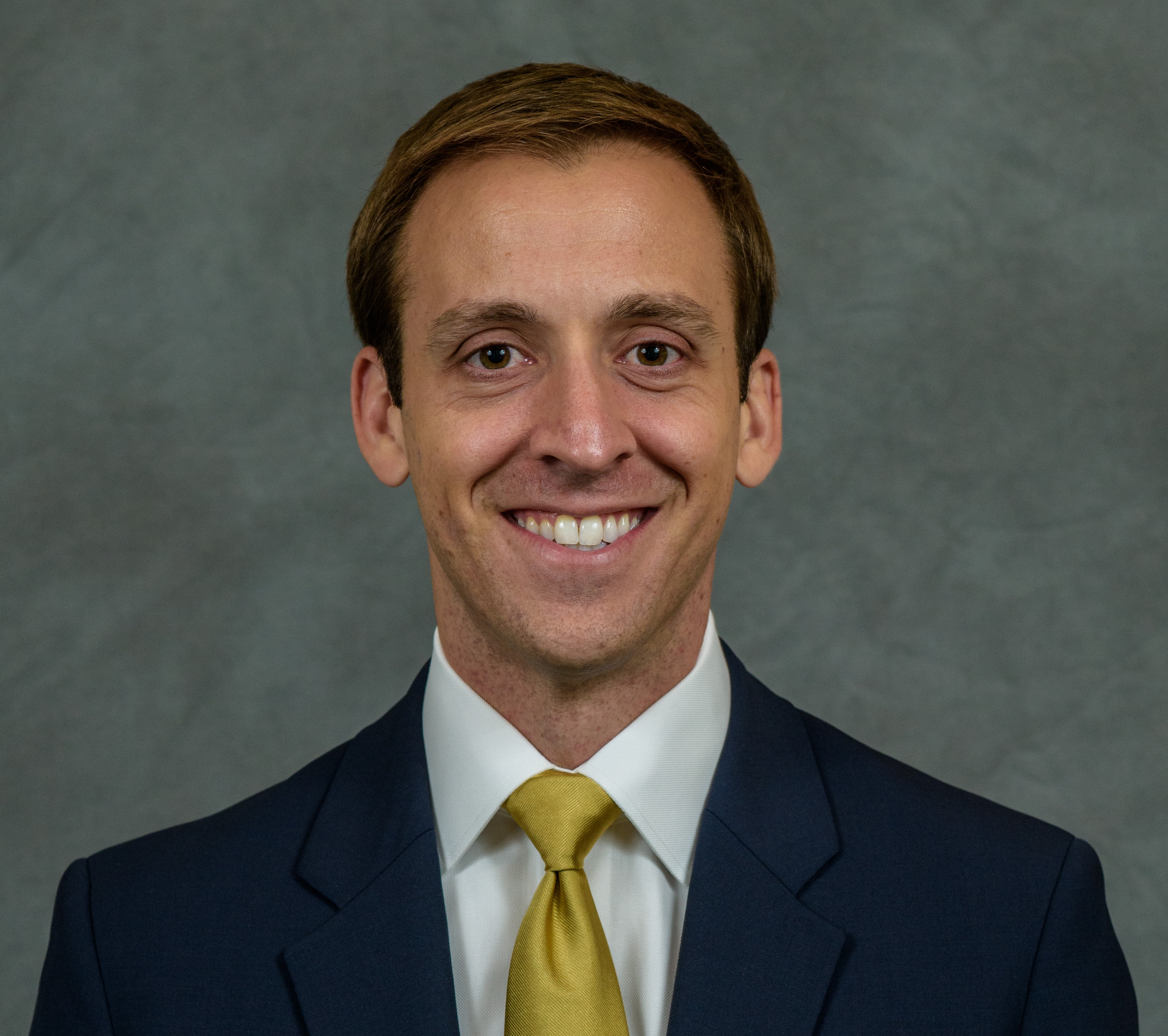
- Gaudin in 2015
- Born: December 18, 1983 (age 42); Evansville, Indiana, U.S.
- Education: Butler University
- Sports commentary career
- Genre: Play-by-play
- Sport(s): College Baseball, College Basketball, College Football, MLB, NFL, NBA
- Employer: Big Ten Network; Fox Sports; Westwood One; Atlanta Braves

Brandon Michael Gaudin (born December 18, 1983) is an American television broadcaster who currently serves as the lead play-by-play announcer for the Atlanta Braves. He has also served as the play-by-play announcer for the Madden NFL series since 2017.

Born in Evansville, Indiana, he previously served as the voice of Georgia Tech football and men's basketball, as well as Butler men's basketball. and has worked various national assignments for ESPN, Fox Sports, TNT Sports, and Westwood One.

== Early life ==
Gaudin was born and raised in Evansville, Indiana. He was an Atlanta Braves fan and wrote a letter to Skip Caray asking how to get into sports broadcasting. Caray responded and encouraged him to practice, critique, and practice some more. Gaudin kept those words in his heart, and in high school convinced a local radio station to allow him to broadcast some of his school's baseball games.

After graduation from Harrison High School, Gaudin enrolled at Butler University where he would graduate with a communications degree with an emphasis in broadcasting. He also majored in Political Science and received a minor in Business. He was named a "Top 10 Male Student" at Butler and given the distinction of the "Most Outstanding Communications Student" in his class.

One of the springboards to Gaudin's career came during his junior year in college, when he won a nationwide play-by-play competition sponsored by CBS during the 2005 NCAA basketball tournament. For winning the award, Gaudin was flown to the Final Four and interviewed at halftime on CBS by Greg Gumbel.

== Career ==
Gaudin's first post-college job was broadcasting Minor League baseball games for the Orem Owlz, an affiliate of the Los Angeles Angels. After one season with Orem, Gaudin took an on-air hiatus to assist in the formation of a New York City start-up with two former bosses at ESPN, where he interned during college. Gaudin, along with Erik Sorenson, the former president of MSNBC, and former Larry King Live Producer Robert Grossman founded MediaOne Management in 2007. The boutique firm specializes in the representation of cable news talking heads.

Gaudin left New York in the fall of 2008 for the opportunity to get back on air in his hometown of Evansville, Indiana as the Voice of the Evansville Purple Aces. He also served as a freelance on-air talent for the local ABC affiliate.

From there, Gaudin returned to Butler, serving three years as the Voice of the Butler Bulldogs. He was hired on the heels of Butler's 2010 run to the National Championship game where they fell to Duke; however, he was on the mic the following season when Butler returned to the Final Four in 2011. During his time at Butler, the Indianapolis Star called Gaudin "a rising star in the industry". While in Indianapolis, he also began freelance play-by-play work for Turner Sports via their partnership with the NCAA, broadcasting various collegiate championships.

In 2013, Gaudin was hired to be the voice of the Georgia Tech Yellow Jackets. His predecessor, Wes Durham, had moved on to call SEC and ACC games for FSN. Gaudin won the job from a long list of over 150 nationwide candidates. Gaudin's hiring was featured in The New York Times where a vice president for rightsholder IMG noted "Gaudin's vocal stylings jumped off the page." Gaudin would call his first game for the Yellow Jackets on August 31, 2013. During his time at Tech, Gaudin was hired by Westwood One as a play-by-play broadcaster for college football and the NCAA basketball tournament.

In June 2016, it was announced Gaudin would serve as the play-by-play announcer for Madden NFL 17. The same month, Gaudin was signed by Fox Sports, primarily taking on a role at Big Ten Network to broadcast football, basketball and baseball.

On February 16, 2023, Bally Sports announced Gaudin as the new play-by-play broadcaster for the Atlanta Braves, replacing Chip Caray (who moved to the St. Louis Cardinals). Gaudin said "I get to be behind the mic for the team I grew up idolizing. And the team who fostered my love for both sports and broadcasting." He was retained with the team's migration to BravesVision in 2026. In March 2026, Gaudin called two early-round games for television coverage of the 2026 NCAA basketball tournament on TruTV,
