= Bishop McGuinness Catholic High School (North Carolina) =

American private school in North Carolina

Location
- 1725 North Carolina Highway 66 South; Kernersville, North Carolina 27284; United States; 36°4′41″N 80°3′42″W

Information
- Type: Private, Catholic school
- Motto: Praesis ut Prosis "Excel that you might better serve"
- Religious affiliation: Catholic Church
- Founded: 1959 (67 years ago)
- Oversight: Diocese of Charlotte
- Superintendent: Dr. Gregory Monroe
- CEEB code: 344463
- President: Dr. Jared Rashford
- Head of school: Mrs. Claire Willis
- Grades: 9–12
- Gender: Co-educational
- Age range: 14–18
- Average class size: 22
- Campus size: 60 acres (240,000 m^{2})
- Colors: Navy and Gold
- Athletics: NCHSAA 2A
- Athletics conference: Greater Triad 1A/2A
- Nickname: Bishop
- Team name: Villains
- Accreditation: Southern Association of Colleges and Schools
- School fees: Student fee: $650; Capital fee: $750 (per family); Senior fee: $220
- Tuition: Catholic: $12,596; Non-Catholic: $17,170; International Students: $19,170 $6,500
- Communities served: Winston-Salem, NC; Greensboro, NC; High Point, NC
- Graduates: 7056
- Website: www.bmhs.us

Bishop McGuinness Catholic High School is a four-year private, college preparatory, catholic school in Kernersville, North Carolina, minutes from downtown Greensboro and Winston-Salem. It operates under the direction of the Diocese of Charlotte.

== Background ==
It is the only Catholic high school in the Piedmont Triad area. The school was named in honor of Eugene Joseph McGuinness (1889–1957), the second Bishop of the Diocese of Raleigh. In 2007, Bishop McGuinness was named one of the nation's top Catholic high schools by the National Catholic High School Honor Roll.

== Partner schools ==
- Our Lady of Grace Catholic School, Greensboro
- Blessed Sacrament School, Burlington
- Our Lady of Mercy Catholic School, Winston-Salem
- Saint Leo Parish School, Winston-Salem
- Immaculate Heart of Mary Catholic School, High Point
- Saint Pius X Catholic School, Greensboro
- Sacred Heart School, Salisbury

== Sports ==
The mascot for Bishop McGuinness is the Villain. The mascot comes from the school's predecessor, the Villa Marie Anna Academy. The school is members of the North Carolina High School Athletic Association (NCHSAA) and are classified as a 2A school. The school is a part of the Greater Triad 1A/2A Conference.

=== Basketball ===
The boys basketball team have won two NCHSAA State Championships, winning in 2009 and again in 2019. The 2009 team holds the school record for most wins in a season (31) and the best overall record (31–2). Boys Basketball have won six state championships in total across the NCISAA and NCHSAA: 1963, 1982, 1983, 1987, 2009, and 2019.

In 2014, the girls basketball team (the Lady Villains) won its ninth consecutive state championship, a NCHSAA record, and tied for the 2nd longest consecutive state championship win streak nationally.

=== Cross-country ===
The Boys' Cross Country team has qualified for the NCHSAA 1A Regional and State meets seven consecutive times since 2005, finishing as low as eight, with their highest finish of third place in the 2011 NCHSAA 1A State Championship at Beeson Park. They have won the NCHSAA Northwest 1A Conference title in 2009 and 2011, as well as having won the NCHSAA 1A Midwest Regional Meet in both 2007 and 2011. They have won the state title twice, in 2012 and 2013.

The Girls' Cross Country team has won the Midwest 1A Regional and Northwest 1A Conference meets five of the past six years, and holds the NCHSAA 1A State Title for 2008, 2012, and 2013.

=== Boys' tennis ===
The Boys' Tennis team won the 2011 NCHSAA 1A State Championship defeating the North Carolina School of Math and Science in the final. In addition to the team championship, Senior Joseph Riazzi won the NCHSAA 1A individual doubles state championship.

=== Volleyball ===
The Girls' Volleyball team won NCHSAA Northwest 1A Conference title in the 2020 season with a 12-1 overall (8-1 conference) record, advancing to the Final Four of the 1A State Championship. In 2021 they repeated as conference champions with a 26-6-1 overall (12-0 conference) record, winning the conference tournament, and advancing to Elite Eight of the 1A State Championship.

== See also ==
- List of high schools in North Carolina
- National Catholic Educational Association
