= Marquee Sports Network =

American regional sports network

- Country: United States
- Broadcast area: Central and Northern Illinois, Central, Northern and Western Indiana, Iowa, Southwestern Michigan, Central and Eastern Nebraska, Southeastern Wisconsin; Nationwide (via satellite)
- Headquarters: Chicago, Illinois

Programming
- Language: English
- Picture format: HDTV 1080i

Ownership
- Owner: Chicago Cubs (50%); Sinclair Broadcast Group (50%)

History
- Launched: February 22, 2020; 6 years ago
- Replaced: NBC Sports Chicago; WGN Sports; WLS-TV

Links
- Webcast: watchmarquee.com/watchnow
- Website: www.marqueesportsnetwork.com

Availability

Streaming media
- DirecTV Stream: Internet Protocol television
- FuboTV: Internet Protocol television

Marquee Sports Network is a regional sports network operated by the Chicago Cubs and the Sinclair Broadcast Group, launched on February 22, 2020. It replaced a trio of channels (cable channel NBC Sports Chicago and broadcast partners WGN-TV and WLS-TV) as the exclusive broadcaster of Cubs games not shown on national TV.

== History ==
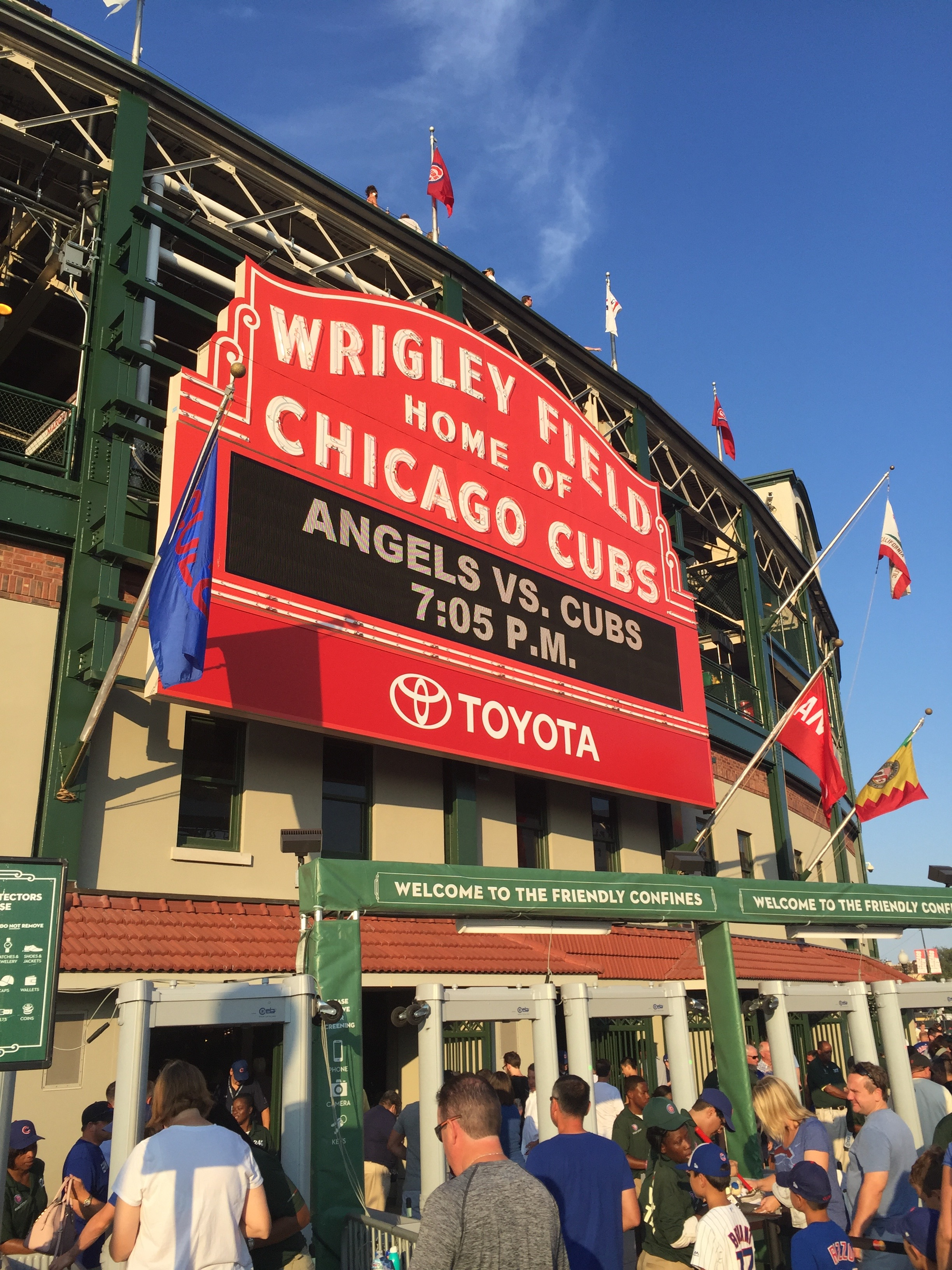
The main entrance marquee outside Wrigley Field, from which the channel derives its name

On November 16, 2015, in an interview with WSCR radio, the Cubs' president of business operations Crane Kenney stated that the team was seeking to launch its own in-house regional sports network after its current broadcast contracts with NBC Sports Chicago, WGN Sports, and WLS-TV expire after the 2019 season.

On December 18, 2018, it was reported by the Chicago Sun-Times that the team was preparing to launch its RSN, "Marquee", in 2020, and that Sinclair Broadcast Group was a frontrunner to serve as managing partner. Sinclair had previously attempted to purchase WGN's parent company Tribune Media, and ran the national sports network Stadium with the White Sox's investment arm Silver Chalice, prior to selling its stake to Silver Chalice in 2023. The venture was officially announced in February 2019 to be launched in 2020 with Sinclair.

On May 22, 2019, Michael McCarthy was named general manager of the Marquee Sports Network after being the Cubs' consultant on the channel. He is the former president of the MSG Network and a former top official with the Milwaukee Bucks (COO) and the St. Louis Blues (vice chairman).

On August 22, 2019, a consortium of Sinclair and Entertainment Studios acquired Fox Sports Networks for $10.6 billion, thus making Marquee a sister to them (FSN previously operated a Chicago network, but it became defunct when Chicago's professional teams abandoned it in favor of a joint venture with Comcast—currently known as NBC Sports Chicago). The divestiture was mandated as part of Disney's acquisition of 21st Century Fox, who chose not to retain the networks under its successor Fox Corporation.

Early reception of Marquee was mixed by fans, culminating in fans booing Cubs chairman Tom Ricketts during the annual Cubs Convention in 2020 after mention of the new network.

Marquee Sports Network officially launched on February 22, 2020, at 1 p.m. CT, with its first program being a launch special hosted by actor and Cubs fan Bill Murray, followed by a documentary on Ernie Banks. The channel aired its first live spring training game against the Oakland Athletics at Sloan Park later in the day; the game had been postponed from the afternoon due to the threat of rain. However, because the start of the season was postponed due to the COVID-19 pandemic, its first regular-season game was not until July 24, 2020.

In October 2020, the Chicago Bears began a partnership with the channel. As part of the agreement, the channel would air a weekly show named "Bear Essentials" as well as a replay of that week's Bears game throughout the season.

Marquee's Cubs broadcasts underwent tweaks for the 2021 season. Alongside its new play-by-play voice Jon Sciambi, the network would no longer require commentators to wear a suit and tie on-air (a mandate made during the inaugural season by executives insisting that Marquee's broadcasts have a "national network quality"), and replaced an unorthodox bottom-centered score bar it had used during the first season with a more traditional scoreboard in the top-left of the screen (a move which also differentiated Marquee from its newly relaunched sister networks in the Bally Sports group, whose on-air branding was derived from that of Marquee, but with an equally-unorthodox integration of a scoreboard and ticker).

The network would use the slogan "We get it" in a marketing campaign to promote the new Cubs season and these tweaks.

In May 2022, the Chicago Sky announced a multi-year broadcast agreement with the network. Prior to the 2025 season, the Sky announced that The U would be its exclusive broadcast partner, ending the team's relationship with Marquee.

In July 2023, Marquee launched a standalone in-market streaming service priced at $19.99 a month. With the service's launch, Marquee also upgraded its streaming video quality to 1080p. Later that year, in September, the Chicago Bears expanded their partnership with the channel and announced that Marquee would be the team's Official Postgame Show Partner, with the new program being named "The Official Bears Postgame Live". The network would also launch an additional weekly Bears program named "Bears Den".

In 2024, Marquee became the exclusive local broadcast partner of Chicago Stars FC. The following year, the team moved its live local games to WFLD-TV, with Marquee airing reruns and other related coverage.

In December 2025, Marquee announced staff cuts and greatly pared back its non-game coverage.

== Talent ==
The Cubs' previous television commentators Len Kasper (play-by-play) and Jim "J.D." Deshaies (color) retained their roles on Marquee at the channel's launch. On May 1, 2019, it was rumored that David Kaplan—NBC Sports Chicago studio host for Cubs Pregame and Postgame shows—had renewed his contract with the channel, dispelling rumors that he planned to join Marquee. Cole Wright (formerly of NFL Network) was to serve as studio host, and Taylor McGregor (formerly field reporter for the Colorado Rockies on AT&T SportsNet Rocky Mountain) was to serve as field reporter. The channel also brought on Bob Vorwald, former executive producer of WGN Sports.

After the 2020 season, Kasper left the Cubs and Marquee to become the radio voice of the Chicago White Sox on WMVP. Jon Sciambi, then a television and radio play-by-play voice on ESPN's MLB national broadcasts, was hired to replace Kasper. Beth Mowins and longtime Cubs radio broadcaster Pat Hughes served as fill-in announcers when Sciambi was not available due to his national televised conflicts, until 2025, when it was announced that Iowa Cubs broadcaster Alex Cohen would be Sciambi's full-time back-up.

Chris Myers worked as a backup play-by play man for Cubs TV games from 2021 to 2023.

== Programming ==
Besides game broadcasts, Marquee carries documentaries, game replays, and player profiles, as well as coverage of some minor league games.

=== Cubs Programming ===
==== Individual programs ====
- Cubs Live!, pre-game
- Cubs Postgame Live!

==== Baseball team rights ====
- Chicago Cubs
- Iowa Cubs (Triple-A) International League
- Knoxville Smokies (Double-A) Southern League
- South Bend Cubs (High-A) Midwest League
- Myrtle Beach Pelicans (Low-A) Carolina League

=== Non-Cubs programming ===
==== Individual Programs ====
- Follow The Money, a weekday morning sports betting show by Vegas Stats & Information Network hosted by Mitch Moss and Pauly Howard
- Live on The Line, a weekday afternoon betting program
- The Reporters, a weekly round table discussion amongst Chicago sports news people regarding local and national sporting news

==== Chicago Bears ====
Due to NFL rules, these programs only run within the Chicago Bears' broadcast area, with alternate programming airing on the network outside of this area.

- The Official Bears Postgame Live (after every Bears game)
- Bear Essentials (weekly on Tuesdays)
- Bears Den (weekly on Thursdays)

==== Chicago Stars ====
- Exclusive game coverage for Chicago Stars in 2024, transitioned to a limited package 2025

==== Collegiate & High School Programming ====
- UIC Flames select men's and women's basketball, baseball, softball and women's volleyball
- DePaul Blue Demons select women's basketball, men's and women's soccer, softball, women's volleyball
- Illinois State Redbirds select men's and women's basketball, football games
- Loyola Chicago Ramblers select home men's and women's basketball, all home men's volleyball
- Northern Iowa Panthers select men's basketball, football games
- Purdue Fort Wayne Mastodons select men's basketball games
- Chicago area high school football, including the annual Chicago Prep Bowl game

=== Former programming ===
- ACC on Regional Sports Networks package - Until the rights were picked up by The CW in 2023
- A package of Conference USA football and men's basketball produced by Stadium until the conference ended its relationship with the network following the 2022–2023 season
- Chicago Sky (2022–2024)
- Chicago Hounds (2023–2024)
- Mountain West Conference football via sister network Stadium

== Broadcasting areas ==
Marquee is broadcast in five states, particularly Illinois (with the exception of Southern Illinois), most of Iowa, eastern Nebraska, all of Indiana except areas near the Ohio River, and Kenosha County, Wisconsin. The broadcasting areas for each state are listed below.

=== Illinois ===
- Chicago metropolitan area (Cook County, DeKalb County, DuPage County, Grundy County, Kankakee County, Kane County, Kendall County, Lake County, McHenry County, Will County)
- Rockford metropolitan area (Boone County, Ogle County, Stephenson County, Winnebago County)
- Dixon, IL micropolitan area (Lee County)
- Quad Cities metropolitan area (Rock Island County, Fulton County, Henry County, Carroll County, Mercer County)
- Galesburg, Illinois micropolitan area (Knox County, Warren County)
- Macomb, IL micropolitan area (McDonough County)
- Peoria metropolitan area (Marshall County, Peoria County, Stark County, Tazewell County, Woodford County)
- Bloomington, Illinois Metropolitan (McLean County)
- Champaign Metropolitan area (Champaign County, Ford County, Piatt County)
- Decatur, IL Metropolitan Statistical Area (Macon County)
- Springfield metropolitan area (Menard County, Sangamon County)

=== Indiana ===
- Chicago metropolitan area (Jasper County, Lake County, Newton County, Porter County)
- South Bend–Mishawaka metropolitan area (St. Joseph County)
- Elkhart-Goshen Metropolitan Statistical Area (Elkhart County, Indiana)
- Warsaw Micropolitan area (Kosciusko County)
- Fort Wayne metropolitan area (Adams County, Allen County, DeKalb County, Huntington County, Noble County, Wells County, Whitley County)
- Logansport micropolitan area (Cass County)
- Lafayette metropolitan area (Benton County, Carroll County, Tippecanoe County, Warren County)
- Frankfort micropolitan area (Clinton County)
- Indianapolis metropolitan area (Boone County, Brown County, Hamilton County, Hancock County, Johnson County, Madison County, Marion County, Morgan County, Putnam County, Shelby County)
- Bloomington metropolitan area (Greene County, Monroe County, Owen County)
- Terre Haute metropolitan area (Clay County, Sullivan County, Vermillion County, Vigo County)

=== Iowa ===
- Iowa City metropolitan area (Johnson County)
- Quad Cities metropolitan area (Scott County, Muscatine County, Cedar County, Clinton County, Jackson County)
- Dubuque, Iowa metropolitan area (Dubuque County)
- Waterloo metropolitan area (Black Hawk County, Bremer County, Buchanan County, Butler County, Chickasaw County, Grundy County)
- Cedar Rapids metropolitan area (Benton County, Jones County, Linn County)
- Fort Dodge, IA micropolitan area (Webster County)
- Burlington, Iowa micropolitan area (Des Moines)
- Fairfield, Iowa micropolitan area (Jefferson County
- Ottumwa, Iowa micropolitan area (Wapello County, Davis County)
- Ames, Iowa metropolitan area (Story County)
- Des Moines metropolitan area (Dallas County, Guthrie County, Jasper County, Madison County, Polk, Warren County)
- Omaha–Council Bluffs metropolitan area (Harrison County, Mills County, Pottawattamie County)
- Sioux City metropolitan area (Plymouth County, Woodbury County)

=== Michigan ===
- South Bend–Mishawaka metropolitan area (Cass County)

=== Nebraska ===
- Sioux City metropolitan area (Burt County, Cuming County, Dakota County, Dixon County, Stanton County, Wayne County)
- Omaha–Council Bluffs metropolitan area (Cass County, Douglas County, Sarpy County, Saunders County, Washington County)
- Lincoln, Nebraska metropolitan area (Lancaster County, Seward County)
- Grand Island metropolitan area (Hall County, Hamilton County, Howard County, Merrick County)
- Kearney Micropolitan area (Buffalo County, Kearney County)

=== Wisconsin ===
- Chicago metropolitan area (Kenosha County)

== Carriage ==
As of February 2020, Sinclair had secured distribution deals with Charter Communications, RCN, DirecTV, Mediacom, and Frontier Communications to carry Marquee Sports Network at launch.

Upon the announcement of the channel, the network's ability to gain carriage was compared to the troubled negotiations of the Los Angeles Dodgers' SportsNet LA. Industry observer Phillip Swan thought Marquee would have a "50-50 chance of working" while commenting "How can you not look at the disaster of the SportsNet (LA) scene and not be a little skeptical?" Charter has since come to terms with DirecTV to carry SportsNet LA.

Industry experts predicted that Marquee would seek around $5 per subscriber placing it behind YES Network and ESPN. Sinclair secured Marquee's first major carriage agreement with Charter Communications on July 11, 2019. As part of the multi-year carriage agreement, Marquee was bundled alongside Sinclair's owned-and-operated television stations, Tennis Channel and the regional Fox Sports Networks that Sinclair was in the process of buying from Disney at the time.

On October 17, 2019, AT&T agreed to carry Marquee on its television services (including DirecTV, the second largest provider serving the region behind Comcast) as part of a larger, multi-year carriage agreement with Sinclair. Sinclair later reached a deal with Mediacom on November 6, 2019, to carry Marquee Sports Network. On February 17, 2020, the network announced an agreement to carry the network on Hulu's live streaming service. On February 27, the network announced an agreement with WOW cable.

Comcast, the largest television provider in the region (with an estimated 1.5 million subscribers), reached an agreement to carry Marquee on July 24 (in time for the Cubs' opening game) as part of a larger renewal for Sinclair-owned television stations and cable networks.

Until May 2022, Marquee's deal with DirecTV was for in-market coverage only. Unlike many other regional sports networks, Marquee was not included in DirecTV's Sports Pack, which carries RSNs nationwide with appropriate blackouts of professional events. That changed May 9, 2022, with the announcement that Marquee would be available nationwide with the Sports Pack, albeit with the appropriate blackouts.

Dish Network and YouTube TV (which has indicated they have no deal for Marquee's sister RSNs after February 29 and would remove them from the platform on that date) have not reached an agreement with Sinclair to carry Marquee Sports Network.

In October 2024, it was reported that the channel had not yet reached a new deal with Comcast after its four-year agreement had expired, and had continued to be carried through short-term extensions. Ultimately a deal was struck on July 27, 2025, with Xfinity announcing that the channel would be moving from its Popular Tier package to the Ultimate Tier following the end of the 2025 regular season.

On March 18, 2026, Hulu and Amazon simultaneously started carried Marquee Sports Network on the Hulu + Live TV service and Prime Video in addition to Marquee’s direct-to-consumer offering as a bonus subscription on Prime.

Additionally, Marquee also has the rights to the games for the Cubs' Minor League Baseball clubs, including the Iowa Cubs and the South Bend Cubs, ending deals with local broadcast subchannels to leverage Iowa and northern Indiana cable systems into carrying the network. Despite airing some minor league games from the Tennessee Smokies and Myrtle Beach Pelicans, Marquee is not available in Tennessee nor South Carolina.
