= Regional sports network =

Type of cable television channel

A regional sports network (RSN) in the United States and Canada is a television channel that presents sports programming to a local media market or geographical region. Such channels often focus on one or a few teams in Major League Baseball, the National Basketball Association, or the National Hockey League. Minor league sports, college sports, and high school sports may also be shown on such networks.

Some RSNs originated as premium channels. Since the 1990s, they have commonly been distributed through the expanded basic tiers of cable television and IPTV services. Direct broadcast satellite providers may require subscribers to purchase a higher programming tier or a specialized sports tier to receive local and out-of-market regional sports networks.

Due to the rise in cord cutting, a number of RSNs closed in the 2020s (including, most prominently, the FanDuel Sports Network chain, the descendent of the Fox Sports Networks); this has led to a shift in business models by many teams, choosing to move their games to free-to-air (FTA) broadcast television, "direct-to-distributor" (DTD) models (where teams negotiate directly with television providers to carry their games on part-time channels rather than operating a full-time RSN, with the broadcasts produced either by the league's media department, a third-party partner, or in-house), and direct-to-consumer (DTC) streaming television (either in combination with FTA or DTD, or in lieu of).

== Overview ==
Viewership and advertising revenue on RSNs are highest during live broadcasts of professional and collegiate sporting events. These broadcasts are often the source content for out-of-market sports packages. During the rest of the day, these channels show news programs covering local and national sports, magazine and discussion programs relating to a team or collegiate conference, fishing and hunting programs, and in-studio video simulcasts of sports radio programs. RSNs also rerun sports events from the recent and distant past. Some RSNs air infomercials. In the United States, DirecTV offers all regional sports networks to all subscribers across the country, but live games and other selected programs are blacked out outside their home markets.

Regional sports networks are generally among the most expensive channels carried by cable television providers. A typical RSN, as of 2024, carries a monthly retransmission fee of $3.50 to $8 per subscriber, double to triple what they charged in 2012 and second only to the $9.42 rate ESPN charges. RSNs justify these high prices by citing demand for the local sports teams they carry, particularly those in Major League Baseball, the National Basketball Association and the National Hockey League, as well as college teams that have large and loyal fanbases. Carriage disputes between distributors and RSNs are often controversial and protracted. Since 2013, television providers such as Charter Spectrum and Verizon FiOS have charged customers a "regional sports network fee" as a separate item on their bills. In response to high and increasing surcharges for RSNs and local broadcast channels, on March 22, 2023, FCC chairwoman Jessica Rosenworcel announced a proposal to require television providers to advertise only "all-in" pricing, including all programming fees.

In Canada, Sportsnet operates four regional sports networks, and the otherwise nationally distributed TSN also maintains some regional operations. This differs from the operational structure of RSNs in the United States, which are independently operated from national sports networks.

Some sports teams own some or all of their respective RSNs. For example, the New York Rangers and New York Knicks have long co-owned their RSNs, MSG and MSG Sportsnet; they also have purchased the rights to the Rangers' local rivals, the New York Islanders and New Jersey Devils. MSG also owns the rights to the Buffalo Sabres, but the Sabres produce their own games for MSG Western New York, a sub-feed that is a joint venture with the Sabres' parent company Pegula Sports and Entertainment.

== History ==
The first regional sports network is considered to be the Madison Square Garden Network. An early unnamed version of that network started broadcasting Knicks and Rangers to a small number of subscribers in Manhattan in May 1969. By the late 1970s another version of this network would launch and be made available to other cable systems in the metropolitan area and it would finally receive the name Madison Square Garden Television in 1980. Another early network considered by many to be an RSN is Philadelphia's PRISM which launched in 1976 offering coverage of three of the city's major sports teams and movies.

In 1976, Cablevision launched a new service providing coverage of Long Island sports (originally called Cablevision Sports 3). This channel would be renamed SportsChannel New York in 1979 and became the first channel to resemble a modern regional sports network. Other SportsChannels were launched in different cities and in 1988, they were formally organized into a group that shared programming and national TV rights.

During the 1990s, some teams experimented with pay-per-view or premium television broadcasts of games, which were generally unpopular. The Portland Trail Blazers ran BlazerVision, which charged a fee for every game, and which blacked out NBA on TNT coverage of Trail Blazer playoff games for fans within 40 miles (64 km) of Portland. The Chicago Blackhawks broadcast games exclusively on Hawkvision between 1992 and 1995.

As sports fans began to prefer watching their favorite teams on television rather than in person, RSNs became a very important source of revenue for professional teams and collegiate conferences. By 2011, regional sports networks were integral to the financial health of many U.S. sports ventures. Teams in smaller media markets were often disadvantaged by their reliance on RSNs, whereas teams in larger markets could negotiate more lucrative media rights deals.

=== Impact of cord-cutting, shifts to free-to-air and OTT ===
In the 21st century, the rise of cord-cutting has led to decreasing cable and satellite television subscriber numbers in the U.S., which in turn has reduced the revenue that RSNs receive from television provider subscriber fees and advertising. These have resulted in an increasing erosion to the RSN market, and attempts to launch over-the-top (OTT) services at RSNs. These services require broadcasters to obtain in-market streaming rights to teams, and have a high cost due to RSNs usually being subsidized by subscribers that are not interested in sports. Major League Soccer, which previously broadcast most of its matches regionally on RSNs, switched to a centralized media rights model in the 2023 season; all match telecasts are now produced in-house and carried internationally on the MLS Season Pass subscription service under a ten-year digital rights agreement with Apple Inc.. In March 2023, Bally Sports parent company Diamond Sports Group filed for chapter 11 bankruptcy protection, while Warner Bros. Discovery Sports (WBD) announced its intent to exit the regional sports market by divesting its AT&T SportsNet channels.

Major League Baseball established a local media department prior to the 2023 season, using resources from MLB Network, to produce telecasts for teams whose RSNs would become unable to broadcast their teams' games. In May 2023, when the rights to the San Diego Padres reverted to the team after Diamond missed a payment, MLB Local Media took over the production of Padres regional games, distributing them via an in-market add-on to MLB.tv, and making agreements to carry the games on local access channels, such as Cox Cable's YurView California. The broadcasts maintain team-contracted staff, such as commentators. In July 2023, MLB Local Media took over the rights to the Arizona Diamondbacks, after Diamond was granted a motion to decline its contract with the team. The Colorado Rockies also joined MLB Local Media for the 2024 season amid the closure of AT&T SportsNet Rocky Mountain. In October 2024, MLB Local Media announced that it would begin producing and distributing broadcasts for the Cleveland Guardians, Milwaukee Brewers, and Minnesota Twins beginning in the 2025 season, although the Brewers would later announce a return to Diamond Sports (since renamed Main Street Sports Group). Also in 2025, the Diamondbacks, Guardians, Padres, and Rockies would announce that they would simulcast a package of games on Tegna stations in each team's home market; while the Twins would agree to deals with Fox and Gray Media. The Texas Rangers' contract with Diamond expired after the 2024 season; the team would ultimately create the Rangers Sports Network, which operates similarly to MLB Local Media, but with a direct-to-consumer package hosted by Victory+ and a package of games syndicated on over the air stations within the Rangers' regional market.

The Atlanta Braves, Cincinnati Reds, Detroit Tigers, Kansas City Royals, Los Angeles Angels, Miami Marlins, Milwaukee Brewers, St. Louis Cardinals, and Tampa Bay Rays, while remaining with the Bally Sports RSNs (since renamed FanDuel Sports Network), would also agree to syndicate packages of games on regional over the air stations as well. Towards the end of the 2025 season, the Seattle Mariners announced that they would shut down Root Sports Northwest; MLB Local Media would take over the team's distribution rights in 2026 after handling broadcast production in 2025. The Washington Nationals would also announce that MLB Local Media would take over the production and distribution of their games in 2026, having recently settled a long-running dispute with the Baltimore Orioles and MASN, who had been the previous carrier of Nationals games. During the same year, Main Street Sports Group's nine remaining MLB team contracts were terminated in the face of continuing financial difficulties; MLB Local Media later assumed the rights to air seven of these teams and the NHL's Detroit Red Wings, who have the same owners as the Tigers. The Atlanta Braves launched a dedicated network called BravesVision, while the Los Angeles Angels instead bought out Main Street Sports Group's share of FanDuel Sports Network West, later rebranding the channel as Angels Broadcast Television.

Some NHL and NBA teams handled the AT&T SportsNet closure by abandoning the RSN model entirely, in favor of a mixture of regional syndication via free-to-air television (such as E. W. Scripps Company's new sports division Scripps Sports), and paid streaming services. The Arizona Coyotes, whose games were formerly on Bally Sports Arizona, signed a contract with Scripps, then deactivated as a franchise the following year and sold its hockey operations to the Utah Mammoth expansion team. The Mammoth, first known as the Utah Hockey Club, produce and distribute games using an in-house media operation that was originally established for the Utah Jazz. After also losing the Phoenix Suns' rights to Gray Television, Bally Sports Arizona shut down entirely in October 2023.

Ahead of the 2024–25 NBA and NHL seasons, more teams ended their contracts with Diamond Sports Group in favor of an FTA/OTT model, including the Dallas Mavericks (with Tegna Inc. and KFAA-TV), Florida Panthers (who signed with Scripps Sports), and the New Orleans Pelicans (who signed with Gray to launch its Gulf Coast Sports & Entertainment Network). After the Seattle Mariners acquired WBD's stake in Root Sports Northwest, the Portland Trail Blazers and Seattle Kraken similarly exited the network, partnering on FTA/OTT models with Sinclair Broadcast Group and Tegna/Amazon Prime Video (the Kraken Hockey Network), respectively. In June 2024, the Blackhawks, Bulls, and White Sox would announce the creation of the Chicago Sports Network with backing from Standard General. While the channel was effectively a new RSN (replacing the teams' previous contracts with NBC Sports Chicago), the channel would be available over the air in addition to offering its OTT service and carriage via various cable and satellite providers in the market (although the network would later scale back its FTA availability as a condition of a carriage agreement with Comcast). Meanwhile, the Dallas Stars would announce that they would stream their games on Victory+, a newly-created free ad-supported streaming television platform; the Anaheim Ducks would also join the Victory+ platform, and sublicensed FTA rights to Fox Television Stations' KCOP and KTTV. Victory+ would later launch linear FAST channels targeting Anaheim and Dallas-related content respectively, effectively creating streaming RSNs.

Before the 2025–26 NHL season, the Tampa Bay Lightning would leave FanDuel Sports Network and announce a deal with Scripps Sports. Several NBA and NHL teams that had remained on the FanDuel Sports Networks have sold packages of game simulcasts to OTA stations within their regional markets. In April 2026, Main Street Sports Group would announce that they would wind down the FanDuel Sports Networks after the end of the then-ongoing NHL and NBA seasons. Following the announcement, the NBA's Detroit Pistons and the NHL's Nashville Predators would sign deals with Scripps Sports; while the Miami Heat signed with local independent station WPLG, the Atlanta Hawks with Gray, and the Charlotte Hornets and Orlando Magic with Cox Media Group stations in both their home markets. The National Hockey League was reportedly in the process of establishing a production hub to provide broadcast services for the remaining former FDSN teams; it would later announce a deal with Amazon Prime Video for local streaming rights to those teams. The Memphis Grizzlies and Minnesota Timberwolves would announce that their regional broadcasts would exclusively stream on DAZN, becoming the first NBA teams to forgo traditional linear television completely; the Cleveland Cavaliers, Indiana Pacers, and San Antonio Spurs would announce their own deals with DAZN including limited packages of over-the-air games. The Los Angeles Clippers would re-launch ClipperVision, which had been their streaming platform from 2022 to 2025, as the streaming home for their regional broadcasts, with games available on local cable and satellite providers and select games simulcast on KTLA.

While the FTA/OTT approach can improve viewership by making a team's telecasts more accessible to viewers, the team can lose out on the guaranteed revenue generated by a rights fee from an RSN: both the Jazz and Suns experienced a drop in revenue from their shift to OTA broadcasts. Jazz owner Ryan Smith stated that he wasn't as concerned about the loss of RSN revenue, since he believed that the team's other revenue streams (such as sponsorships and ticket sales) benefited from the wider accessibility of the team's broadcasts. In the NBA, a reduction in RSN revenue can also be offset by contributions from the league's revenue sharing agreement. MLB reported in 2026 that among teams that had lost RSN deals, contracts with new broadcasters have paid about 50% of their former RSN rights fees on average, contributing to a disparity among teams' payroll totals. That same year, the Atlanta Braves reported a 12% decline in media revenue for the first half of 2026, compared to the first half of 2025.

In May 2026, following Gray's renewal with the Phoenix Suns, it was reported that the team had nearly recuperated the $36 million value of its previous contract with Bally Sports Arizona, and that the team had the fourth-highest local television viewership in the NBA behind only the Boston Celtics, Golden State Warriors, and New York Knicks (which air on RSNs). Team CEO Josh Bartelstein stated that the OTA model had been "validated" by the Suns' success, and that the team has regularly received phone calls from other NBA executives asking about it.

In July 2026, the Anaheim Ducks and Texas Rangers would elect to leave the Victory+ platform (with the latter moving to the social sports platform Bzzr over the All-Star break), with the Sports Business Journal citing reports that Victory+ had failed to pay rights fees for several of its partners. It would later report that uncertainty surrounding a proposed centralized streaming platform for regional NBA broadcasts, reportedly set to launch in 2027, dissuaded additional funding for Victory+, while the Ducks' and Rangers' non-exclusive broadcasts hurt Victory+'s revenue. The Dallas Stars would later leave Victory+ in August; both the Ducks and Stars would later sign deals with Amazon Prime Video and join NHL Productions' hub model, while Victory+ would dissolve shortly afterward.

== United States ==
=== FanDuel Sports Network ===
For more than 20 years, the primary RSN in many markets was owned by Fox Sports. Fox Sports Networks, which launched on November 1, 1996, as Fox Sports Net, was created through former parent News Corporation's October 1995 purchase of a 50% equity stake in Liberty Media-owned Prime Sports Networks, co-founded in 1988 by Bill Daniels and Liberty's then-sister company Tele-Communications Inc. The group expanded further in June 1997, Fox/Liberty Networks, the joint venture company operated by News Corporation and Liberty Media, purchased a 40% interest in the Cablevision-owned SportsChannel group.

As part of a rebranding effort, the collective branding of the networks – which eventually became "FSN (Region/City)" in 2004 – was extended to Fox Sports (Region/City) (also used from 1996 to 2000) with the start of the 2008 college football season. The FSN networks were acquired by Diamond Sports Group from The Walt Disney Company in 2019, as Disney was required to divest them by U.S. Department of Justice as a condition of their own acquisition of 21st Century Fox. The channel group was renamed Bally Sports on March 31, 2021, as part of a naming rights agreement with casino operator Bally's Corporation.

On February 15, 2023, Diamond Sports Group (later Main Street Sports Group), the parent company of Bally Sports, failed to make a $140M interest payment, instead opting for a 30-day grace period to make the payment. During this grace period, Diamond Sports also missed a rights payment to the Arizona Diamondbacks. On March 14, 2023, Diamond Sports filed for Chapter 11 bankruptcy. In October 2023, following the loss of airing Phoenix Suns and Arizona Diamondbacks games during the year, Bally Sports Arizona dropped coverage of the Arizona Coyotes during the preseason, which subsequently led to Bally Sports Arizona being the first Bally Sports-related regional sports network to shut down. In October 2024, the networks were renamed again to FanDuel Sports Network, as part of an agreement with online gambling company FanDuel.

In February 2026, FanDuel Sports Network lost the rights to all nine of the MLB clubs it had broadcast, after failing to make payments on time. Seven of these teams (the Cincinnati Reds, Kansas City Royals, Miami Marlins, Milwaukee Brewers, St. Louis Cardinals, Tampa Bay Rays, and Detroit Tigers) moved to distribute their games via MLB Local Media; a distribution deal was also reached for the Detroit Tigers' sister NHL team, the Detroit Red Wings. The Atlanta Braves announced an in-house direct-to-distributor broadcasting operation known as BravesVision in partnership with Gray's Raycom Sports division (which had long been associated with local college sports), while the Los Angeles Angels reportedly reached an agreement to buy out FanDuel Sports Network West from Main Street. Later that month, Main Street Sports Group issued WARN Act notifications indicating that it would begin laying off employees and permanently closing offices starting in the middle of April. The final RSNs under Main Street Sports Group stopped broadcasting major league sports on April 30, 2026, after the first round of that year's NHL playoffs. Main Street Sports Group would end up suing Comcast and Charter in August 2026, alleging that the two providers had underpaid for the channels by terminating their broadcast agreements after the end of the previous season's NBA and NHL playoffs. The FanDuel Sports Networks would wind up ceasing operations by October 2026.

=== NBC Sports Regional Networks ===
Cable conglomerate Comcast began creating Comcast SportsNet (CSN) after their March 1996 purchase of a 66% stake in Philadelphia-based event organizer Spectacor, which owned the Flyers and 76ers. Comcast SportsNet Philadelphia, the first CSN channel, launched on October 1, 1997. CSN purchased a small number of RSNs previously owned by Fox Sports Networks, and acquired the local rights to professional teams that FSN regional networks carried. In two markets, the latter situation resulted in Fox Sports shutting down their networks.

Comcast's 2011 acquisition of NBC Universal allowed the networks to be merged into its NBC Sports division. In April 2017, Comcast SportsNet's California and Bay Area networks were rebranded under the NBC Sports brand; NBC Sports Regional Networks adopted the "NBC Sports" moniker on its other regional channels on October 2, 2017.

=== AT&T Sports Networks ===
In May 2009, DirecTV Group Inc. announced that it would become a part of Liberty Media's entertainment unit, with some of the group's assets subsequently being spun off as a separate company under the DirecTV banner; the Fox Sports Networks outlets that became part of the Liberty Sports unit (which was renamed DirecTV Sports Networks on November 19, 2009) were rebranded under the new name "Root Sports" on April 1, 2011.

DirecTV Sports Networks would be acquired by AT&T Inc. in 2015, as a byproduct of its acquisition of DirecTV. The renamed RSN unit, AT&T Sports Networks, rebranded its regional sports networks – excluding Root Sports Northwest, which is mostly owned by the Seattle Mariners – under the AT&T SportsNet banner on July 14, 2017. In September 2018, AT&TSN was transferred to the WarnerMedia News & Sports division.

In February 2020, the New York Post reported that AT&T had abandoned a plan to divest the channels, after only receiving bids in excess of $500 million (rather than the $1 billion valuation it had expected). In May 2021, it was announced that AT&T would instead divest the entirety of WarnerMedia, and contribute it into a joint venture with Discovery Inc., forming a new company later announced as Warner Bros. Discovery. Discovery announced on April 7, 2022, that Patrick Crumb, president of AT&T Sports Networks, would report to the yet-to-be-named Chairperson for Warner Bros. Discovery Sports; Jeff Zucker departed the company upon the completion of the merger, but his successor Chris Licht would only oversee CNN. The merger was completed the following day.

On February 24, 2023, Warner Bros. Discovery announced that it would leave the RSN business, and informed its RSNs' teams that they had until March 31 to take their rights back or acquire the networks. Root Sports Northwest was not affected, because that channel was majority-owned by the Seattle Mariners. This deadline passed with no changes in operations; it was later reported that WBD had been negotiating an agreement with MLB to ensure that the networks would continue operating as normal through the end of the 2023 regular season.

In October 2023, AT&T SportsNet Pittsburgh was acquired by the Pittsburgh Penguins (with NESN—a sister via the team's parent Fenway Sports Group—assuming day-to-day operations) and renamed to SportsNet Pittsburgh. The Pirates later bought a stake in the network as well. The Houston Astros and Rockets acquired WBD's shares in AT&T SportsNet Southwest and rebranded it as Space City Home Network. AT&T SportsNet Rocky Mountain closed in October 2023, with the Utah Jazz moving to Sinclair Broadcast Group's KJZZ-TV, and the Colorado Rockies foregoing a new television deal and moving under MLB Local Media.

In 2024, the Mariners acquired WBD's stake in Root Sports Northwest. Mariners telecasts began to be produced by MLB Local Media in 2025; at the end of the regular season, it was announced that the channel would close, and MLB Local Media would assume distribution of Mariners games beginning in 2026.

=== Spectrum Sports ===
Spectrum Sports is the collective name for a group of regional sports networks that are primarily owned and operated by Charter Communications through its acquisition of Time Warner Cable in May 2016.

=== Broadcast television RSNs ===
In 2018, Sinclair relaunched its Reno MyNetworkTV station KAME-TV as Nevada Sports Net, with a focus on Nevada Wolf Pack college sports and Reno Aces baseball. It later acquired the rights to the Golden Knights' syndication package with Scripps Sports.

Some regional sports networks have been formed as digital multicast television networks. BEK Communications Cooperative operates BEK Sports, an RSN focusing on North Dakota high school sports, across several stations in the state.

In 2023, Gray Television (the current owner of sports syndicator Raycom Sports) began a strategy of launching RSNs across groups of stations; this strategy began with Arizona's Family Sports, which features Phoenix Suns and Mercury basketball, and ancillary programming for the Arizona Cardinals of the NFL. Gray has since established similar networks in markets where its stations have regional coverage, such as the Peachtree Sports Network (which is carried on the digital subchannels of multiple Gray stations in Georgia, led by WPCH-TV), Matrix Midwest in St. Louis, Missouri (a rebranding of KMOV's MyNetworkTV subchannel), Rock Entertainment Sports Network in Ohio (in partnership with Dan Gilbert's Rock Entertainment, owner of the Cleveland Cavaliers), and Gulf Coast Sports & Entertainment Network (which carries New Orleans Pelicans basketball beginning in the 2024–25 season, with WVUE-DT as flagship).

In 2024, the Chicago Blackhawks, Bulls, and White Sox launched the Chicago Sports Network (CHSN) with Standard General to replace NBC Sports Chicago, which is distributed via over-the-air affiliates in addition to cable and OTT. In 2025, CHSN discontinued OTA availability in certain markets such as Chicago in order to achieve carriage on Comcast.

== Canada ==
=== Sportsnet ===
Sportsnet (formerly known as CTV Sportsnet and Rogers Sportsnet) is owned by the Rogers Media division of Toronto-based Rogers Communications. Although it is considered a national channel with multiple feeds for regulatory purposes, in practice its four main channels act as a set of RSNs, albeit with a significant portion of common national programming; the main regional programming carried by the channels are NHL games, with Sportsnet holding exclusive rights to regional Calgary Flames, Edmonton Oilers, and Vancouver Canucks games, and splitting regional Toronto Maple Leafs games with TSN (due to their previous joint ownership stake in the team's parent company Maple Leaf Sports & Entertainment). As Sportsnet holds the national media rights to the NHL, the channels regularly carry national broadcasts of these teams that are not subject to blackout, as well as those of the NHL's other Canadian teams.

Through the separate Sportsnet One licence, Rogers also operates three regional overflow channels—Sportsnet Flames, Sportsnet Oilers, and Sportsnet Canucks—for games.

Rogers is the majority shareholder in Maple Leaf Sports & Entertainment (MLSE), which owned Leafs Nation Network, a channel devoted entirely to the Toronto Maple Leafs and its American Hockey League affiliate, the Toronto Marlies. MLSE also operates NBA TV Canada, which is distributed nationally but has featured programming focused on the MLSE-owned Toronto Raptors and its NBA G League affiliate Raptors 905, and the separately-owned Toronto Tempo of the WNBA.

=== TSN/RDS ===
On August 25, 2014, The Sports Network (TSN), another Canadian sports channel, split its singular national feed into four regional feeds in a manner similar to Sportsnet. These feeds are primarily used to broadcast regional NHL games, but may also be used to provide alternative and common national programming.

While each region has a primary TSN channel, due to overlaps in NHL territories it is possible in some parts of Ontario to access additional regional games from one non-primary channel.

Prior to the launch of these channels, regional NHL games whose rights were held by TSN (which, at that point, consisted solely of the Jets and Canadiens) were broadcast on special part-time channels exclusive to the team's television region.

Bell Media also owns Réseau des sports (RDS) and RDS2, French-language sports networks that are licensed to serve all of Canada, but in practice focus on the predominantly French-speaking province of Quebec. Prior to the 2014–15 season, RDS could air Canadiens games on a national basis, as it was also the national French-language rightsholder of the National Hockey League in Canada. With Rogers' acquisition of the exclusive national media rights to the NHL, and its decision to sub-license French rights to Quebecor Media's TVA Sports, RDS and RDS2's coverage of the Canadiens and Senators are now restricted to parts of Eastern Ontario, Quebec and Atlantic Canada.

== Regional syndicators ==
Some telecasts (especially in American college sports) are broadcast by ad-hoc syndicated packages, which can be picked up on a network of broadcasters that may consist of either individual over-the-air stations, regional sports networks, or a mixture of both.

Jefferson-Pilot Communications and Raycom Sports were well known as syndicators of college sports on broadcast television, having previously held agreements with the Atlantic Coast Conference (ACC) and Southeastern Conference (SEC). By the late-2000's. both packages began to wind down after ESPN acquired the media rights to both conferences; ESPN initially maintained a syndicated package known as "SEC Network", while Raycom was given a sub-license to continue its syndication package (subsequently renamed "ACC Network"). Both packages ended when ESPN launched dedicated cable channels for both conferences.

ESPN was originally intended to focus on sports in Connecticut, but chose to broadcast nationally when it debuted in 1979 when it was discovered by the network's founders that it would be less expensive to broadcast nationwide on satellite as opposed to regionally through microwave transmission. ESPN formerly served as a college sports syndicator via ESPN Regional Television—formerly branded on-air as ESPN Plus, but later using conference-oriented brands such as SEC Network (not to be confused with the SEC Network cable channel which succeeded it), and Big East Network. The SEC Network package was a successor to the previous Raycom Sports-produced SEC package.

In 2014, television station owner Sinclair Broadcast Group established its own sports syndicator known as the American Sports Network (ASN), primarily syndicating broadcasts of college football and basketball from mid-major conferences (some of which were previously associated with ESPN Plus) to stations that it owns and operates. In 2015, Sinclair also acquired regional rights to Major League Soccer's Real Salt Lake, with ASN handling production and distribution of team telecasts within its designated market. ASN later began to operate a dedicated channel; in contrast to other sports channels, it was distributed free-to-air as a digital multicast television network, and eventually subsumed its syndication of individual telecasts. In 2017, the channel was relaunched as Stadium as part of a joint venture with Silver Chalice, which expanded its programming and added a focus on distribution via free ad-supported streaming television (FAST).

== See also ==
- Broadcasting of sports events
- Terrestrial loophole
- List of sports television channels
- Major League Baseball on regional sports networks
