= BravesVision =

Regional sports network operated by the Atlanta Braves

- Type: Regional sports network
- Country: United States
- Broadcast area: Alabama; Georgia; Mississippi; South Carolina; Tennessee western North Carolina

Programming
- Language: English

Ownership
- Owner: Atlanta Braves

History
- Launched: March 27, 2026

Availability

Terrestrial
- List of over-the-air affiliates
- DirecTV: 645
- U-Verse: 1730
- Xfinity: 1254

Streaming media
- DirecTV Stream: Internet Protocol television
- FuboTV: Internet Protocol television

BravesVision is a part-time regional sports network operated by the Atlanta Braves in partnership with Raycom Sports. Launched during the 2026 season, the channel serves as the broadcaster for Atlanta Braves games not televised exclusively by Major League Baseball's national media partners, succeeding FanDuel Sports Network South amid its financial issues and closedown.

The unit expands upon a working relationship between the Braves and Gray Media which began in the 2025 season; Raycom Sports serves as a production partner for BravesVision alongside team-employed personnel carried over from FDSN, with Gray handling advertising sales, and providing use of a studio at WANF in Atlanta.

Similarly to MLB Local Media, it is distributed via ad-hoc arrangements with television providers within the Braves' regional footprint, while MLB.tv hosts a direct to consumer (DTC) streaming package under the Braves.tv banner. BravesVision will also syndicate a package of games throughout the season to Gray Media stations in the team's market.

== History ==
=== Braves on Gray ===
Prior to the 2025 season, the Braves announced a broadcast television deal with Gray Media—the current owner of Atlanta's WPCH-TV (the former WTBS, a station which the team has had a longstanding association with)—under which WPCH, sister station WANF, and a regional network of Gray Media stations across the team's broadcast territory (branded as Braves on Gray), would air 10 regular season Braves games in simulcast with FanDuel Sports Network South. The stations would also air a package of 15 spring training games; unlike the regular season package, these games were exclusive to broadcast television and produced in-house via Gray's subsidiary Raycom Sports.

=== FanDuel Sports Network closure, BravesVision formation ===
In January 2026, Main Street Sports Group's nine remaining regional contracts with MLB teams were terminated due to missed payments, amid financial issues, and declined offers by sports streaming service DAZN to acquire the company. This impacted the Atlanta Braves, whose regional broadcasts were carried by FanDuel Sports Network South. Pending further developments, FanDuel Sports Network announced that it will likely cease operations entirely following the conclusion of the current NBA and NHL seasons. While seven of the impacted teams were expected to move their regional rights to MLB Local Media, the Atlanta Braves were reported to be considering in-house options, including the possibility of establishing their own team-owned regional sports network to replace FanDuel Sports Network.

In the meantime, the Braves renewed their contract with Gray Media, which would produce a package of 15 spring training games. Taking advantage of the existing working relationship, the Braves partnered with Gray and Raycom Sports to serve as the main production partner for a new broadcasting operation, which would be known on-air as BravesVision. Gray had recently begun a larger push into professional sports, including establishing a chain of broadcast television RSNs (such as the Peachtree Sports Network), and acquiring rights to the Phoenix Suns and New Orleans Pelicans of the NBA. Raycom Sports executive producer Rob Reichley noted that the company had long-been associated with televised sports in the South (including its past relationships with the Atlantic Coast Conference and Southeastern Conference in college sports), but believed that the Braves were the "gold medal" of professional sports properties in the region.

The productions leverage ongoing expansions of Raycom Sports' operations to accommodate professional sports; in comparison to the previous FDSN broadcasts, the BravesVision broadcasts are produced in 1080p and have a larger array of cameras, including additional slow-motion cameras, a shallow depth-of-field camera, and some games incorporating multiple FPV drones and helicopters. For away games, the unit will send its own dedicated camera crew rather than pool with the home team's broadcaster, which the Braves' executive producer Gretchen Kaney noted would allow the team to "tell as many of our own stories as we want", and have "a lot more freedom to be creative and push the envelope". Studio programming is broadcast from an outdoor studio in The Battery outside Truist Park, with the facilities of Gray's WANF in Atlanta used as a secondary studio when necessary (such as road games). As part of the production agreement, Gray also handles advertising sales for BravesVision's broadcasts.

== Carriage ==
Similarly to MLB Local Media, BravesVision is distributed as a part-time channel via partnerships with television providers serving the Braves' home market; MLB Advanced Media distributes the in-market subscription streaming service Braves.tv on MLB.tv.

In 2026, the Atlanta Braves signed multi-year agreements with DirecTV, FuboTV, and Xfinity that cover across the Braves’ broadcast territory. Localized agreements were also signed with Spectrum, Absolute Cable TV, Comporium, Pine Belt Communications, and several others.

=== Over-the-air affiliates ===
As part of BravesVision, a package of games will also air in simulcast on broadcast television via the Braves on Gray network, with 25 games planned for the 2026 season.

City of license / Market	Station	Channel	Affiliation
Albany, Georgia	WALB	10.2	ABC
Albany, Georgia	WGCW-LD	36.4	PSN
Atlanta, Georgia	WANF	46.1	Independent
Atlanta, Georgia	WPCH-TV	17.2	PSN
Augusta, Georgia	WAGT-CD	26.2	PSN
Augusta, Georgia	WRDW-TV	12.1	CBS
Birmingham, Alabama	WBRC	6.1	FOX
Birmingham, Alabama	WBRC	6.3	GCSEN
Biloxi–Gulfport–Pascagoula, Mississippi	WLOX	13.1	ABC
Biloxi–Gulfport–Pascagoula, Mississippi	WLOX	13.2	CBS
Biloxi–Gulfport–Pascagoula, Mississippi	WLOX	13.3	Bounce TV
Biloxi–Gulfport–Pascagoula, Mississippi	WTBL-LD	51.3	GCSEN
Charleston, South Carolina	WCSC-TV	5.1	CBS
Charleston, South Carolina	WCSC-TV	5.3	PS&E
Charlotte, North Carolina	WBTV	3.1	CBS
Charlotte, North Carolina	WBTV	3.2	Bounce TV
Columbia, South Carolina	WIS	10.4	PS&E
Columbus, Georgia	WTVM	9.3	PSN
Dothan, Alabama	WTVY	4.1	CBS
Dothan, Alabama	WTVY	4.5	PSN
Greenville–Spartanburg–Anderson, South Carolina and Asheville, North Carolina	WHNS	21.2	PS&E
Hattiesburg–Laurel, Mississippi	WDAM-TV	7.2	ABC
Hattiesburg–Laurel, Mississippi	WLHA-LD	18.2	GCSEN
Huntsville–Decatur, Alabama	WAFF	48.3	TVSEN
Jackson, Mississippi	WLBT	3.3	GCSEN
Knoxville, Tennessee	WVLT-TV	8.1	CBS
Knoxville, Tennessee	WVLT-TV	8.2	MyNetworkTV
Macon, Georgia	WPGA-LD	50.1	PSN
Macon, Georgia	WPGA-TV	58.1	MeTV
Memphis, Tennessee	WMC-TV	5.3	MSEN
Meridian, Mississippi	WTOK-TV	11.5	GCSEN
Mobile, Alabama and Pensacola, Florida	WALA-TV	10.1	FOX
Mobile, Alabama and Pensacola, Florida	WALA-TV	10.5	GCSEN
Montgomery, Alabama	WSFA	12.2	Bounce TV
Montgomery, Alabama	WSFA	12.3	GCSEN
Myrtle Beach–Florence, South Carolina	WMBF-TV	32.3	PS&E
Nashville, Tennessee	WSMV-TV	4.2	TVSEN
Savannah, Georgia	WPHJ-LD	19.3	PSN
Savannah, Georgia	WTOC-TV	11.1	CBS

== Personnel ==
The Braves' existing broadcast team carried over to BravesVision, including commentators Brandon Gaudin and C.J. Nitkowski. Studio coverage is hosted by Peter Moylan, Nick Green, and Charlie Culberson.

== See also ==
- Rangers Sports Network, a similar operation established by the Texas Rangers
