= Blessed Sacrament School =

Blessed Sacrament School or Blessed Sacrament Catholic School may refer to:

== Schools in Canada ==
- Blessed Sacrament School (Wainwright, Alberta)
- Blessed Sacrament School (Vancouver), Vancouver, British Columbia
- Blessed Sacrament Catholic School (Kitchener, Ontario), see Waterloo Catholic District School Board

== Schools in the United States ==
- Blessed Sacrament School (Burlington, North Carolina)
- Blessed Sacrament School (Denver, Colorado), Denver, Colorado
- Blessed Sacrament School (Laredo, Texas)
- Blessed Sacrament Catholic School (San Antonio, Texas), see List of education facilities in San Antonio
- Blessed Sacrament School (Sandy, Utah)
- Blessed Sacrament School (Washington, D.C.)
- Blessed Sacrament School (Westminster, California)
- Blessed Sacrament School (Savannah, Georgia)
- Blessed Sacrament School (Sandy, Utah)
- Blessed Sacrament School (Waterbury, Connecticut)

== See also ==
- Most Blessed Sacrament Elementary School (Kentucky)
