= Victory+ =

Over-the-top sports streaming service

- Company type: Over-the-top media service
- Founded: July 9, 2024; 2 years ago
- Dissolved: September 1, 2026; 60 days ago
- Headquarters: Dallas, Texas, U.S.
- Area served: Canada; United States; (Each team's regional availability varies)
- Owners: Victory Plus, Inc.
- Founder: Neil Gruninger
- CEO: Jon Spencer
- Key people: Jon Spencer; Neil Gruninger; Brad Alberts; Jason Walsh
- Industry: Sports broadcasting
- Parent: Dallas Stars; A Parent Media Company
- Website: victoryplus.com
- Registration: Required
- Launched: September 11, 2024; 2 years ago
- Current status: Dissolved

Victory+ was an American free ad-supported streaming television (FAST) service owned by Calgary-based A Parent Media Co. It officially launched in September 2024, ahead of the 2024–25 NHL season.

The service was first established in partnership with the Dallas Stars of the National Hockey League (NHL), offering in-market streaming of regional Stars games not broadcast by one of the NHL's national media partners, as well as other team-produced video content. The contract succeeded an agreement with Bally Sports Southwest, which was terminated as part of a restructuring by its parent company Diamond Sports Group.

Prior to its launch, Victory+ would expand beyond Dallas Stars content; prior to the 2026-27 NHL season, it would also partner with the NHL's Anaheim Ducks to succeed a contract with Bally Sports West, and sub-licensed selected preseason—and later, regular season—games from the St. Louis Blues. In 2025, Victory+ became the paid streaming partner for the Texas Rangers' new Rangers Sports Network, and the service began to add non-regional content, including streaming agreements with the National Women's Soccer League, Overtime, the Major Arena Soccer League, and the Western Hockey League. Beginning in July 2026, Victory+ would progressively lose its major sports rights and would wind up announcing its dissolution by September of that year.

== History ==
=== Formation ===
On March 14, 2023, Diamond Sports Group, the parent company of the Dallas Stars' then-broadcaster Bally Sports Southwest (now FanDuel Sports Network Southwest), filed for chapter 11 bankruptcy. In July 2024, as part of the company's restructuring process, Diamond filed a motion with the U.S. bankruptcy court to terminate the company's contract with the Dallas Stars. Prior to 2021, it was part of the Fox Sports Regional Networks, which were then sold off by The Walt Disney Company after acquiring the entertainment unit of 21st Century Fox in 2019.

On July 7, 2024, the Stars subsequently announced a seven-year contract with Calgary-based A Parent Media Co. (APMC, who also owns children's video platform Kidoodle.TV, and is the streaming provider for the sports comedy troupe Dude Perfect) to launch a free ad-supported streaming platform for the team's ancillary video content and regional games, known as Victory+, beginning in the 2024–25 season. The name of the service comes from the Stars' team color of "Victory Green" (which is also the namesake of the team's mascot, Victor E. Green).

In August 2024, Victory+ would add regional rights to a second NHL team—the Anaheim Ducks—under a two-year agreement; the team declined to renew its contract with Bally Sports West & SoCal. The team also reached a sublicensing agreement with Fox Television Stations to simulcast the games on KCOP-TV, with selected games airing on parent Fox station KTTV.

The service officially launched on September 11, 2024. At launch, it was available to download on Android, Google TV, iOS, Roku, and Amazon Fire TV devices. The same day, the Stars announced an agreement with Cumulus Media to stream the team's radio broadcaster KTCK The Ticket on Victory+.

In May 2025, Victory+ announced linear "Victory+ Anaheim" and "Victory+ Dallas" FAST channels for Samsung TV Plus, which primarily focus on content oriented towards those markets.

In September 2025, Victory+ announced an agreement with the National Women's Soccer League (NWSL) to broadcast 57 matches on the platform, with 25 matches to air on Sunday nights. The agreements were to last through the 2026 and 2027 seasons.

=== Collapse ===
On July 15, 2026, it was reported that the Texas Rangers informed Victory+ that they will be terminating their streaming rights agreements effective immediately, while the Anaheim Ducks were reported to have similarly declined a renewal of its contract with the service. The Sports Business Journal reported that the streaming service has missed rights fees in recent months and had been unable to obtain additional financing. The Rangers announced they would move to the new startup Bzzr effective immediately.

The NWSL followed suit and terminated its agreement on July 30, moving all games to its in-house streaming platform NWSL+. The same day, Neil Gruninger was removed as Victory+ CEO, and was replaced with Jon Spencer. Reporting on the change, the Sports Business Journal noted that uncertainty surrounding a proposed centralized streaming platform for regional NBA broadcasts, reportedly set to launch in 2027, dissuaded additional funding for Victory+ while the Ducks' and Rangers' non-exclusive broadcasts hurt Victory+'s revenue.

On September 1, 2026, the Dallas Morning News reported that Victory+ would end operations, citing an email sent to various high school districts whose games the service had been scheduled to broadcast. The next day, the Ducks and Stars announced that they would join NHL Productions' new local media unit beginning in the 2026–27 NHL season, with both teams streaming on Amazon Prime Video for Amazon Prime subscribers, and the Ducks continuing to simulcast all regional games on KCOP/KTTV. The Western Hockey League (WHL) similarly announced an interim move from Victory+ to YouTube for the start of the upcoming season.

== Programming ==
=== Former national/international broadcast rights ===
In November 2024, Victory+ announced an agreement to become the exclusive streaming home of the Women's National Football Conference.

In February 2025, Victory+ announced an agreement with Overtime, adding non-exclusive rights to events from its Overtime Elite, OT Select, and OT7 leagues, and OTX boxing. It also reached a streaming agreement with the Major Arena Soccer League.

In March 2025, Victory+ announced a streaming agreement with the Western Hockey League (WHL), a major junior hockey league operating in Western Canada and the U.S. Pacific Northwest; beginning with the 2025 playoffs, Victory+ streamed all WHL games worldwide (aside from the WHL finals), along with ancillary content such as classic games. The platform also acquired rights to the three Canadian Hockey League finals and 2025 Memorial Cup outside of Canada.

In September 2025, Victory+ announced an agreement with the National Women's Soccer League to broadcast 57 matches on the platform, with 25 matches to air on Sunday nights. The agreements extended through the 2026 and 2027 seasons; the NWSL would ultimately end its agreement with Victory+ in July 2026 over missed payments.

In December 2025, Victory+ announced an agreement with League One Volleyball (LOVB) to broadcast 20 regular season matches and two postseason events. Victory+ also had an agreement to stream all matches featuring the Dallas Pulse of Major League Volleyball.

Victory+ began airing college baseball for the first time in 2026 when it picked up the rights to air the Puerto Rico Challenge.

=== Former regional programming rights ===
==== Rangers Sports Network (2025–2026) ====
On January 15, 2025, the Texas Rangers of Major League Baseball announced a multi-year agreement to stream its games on Victory+ beginning in the 2025 season via the team-owned Rangers Sports Network. Unlike Stars games, these games will require either the purchase of a paid subscription priced at $100 per-season, or TV Everywhere authentication with a television provider that had reached an agreement to carry the games.

On July 15, 2026, the Texas Rangers announced that Rangers Sports Network will no longer be carried on Victory+, and will move their games to the brand new streaming platform BZZR, effective starting on July 17, 2026.

==== National Hockey League (2024-2026) ====
Prior to the 2026-27 NHL Season, Victory+ held the streaming rights to Dallas Stars and the Anaheim Ducks of the National Hockey League from 2024 to 2026, airing all games that weren't nationally televised by the NHL's media partners; the games would stream for free on the teams' respective markets. Both teams previously had broadcast agreements with FanDuel Sports Network. The Ducks also have a sublicensing agreement with Fox Television Stations to simulcast its regional broadcasts on KCOP-TV and KTTV in Los Angeles. In March 2025, Victory+ reached a sublicensing agreement with Fox Television Stations to simulcast four Stars games on KDFI and KDFW through the remainder of the 2024–25 regular season. For the 2025–26 season, this agreement was later enlarged into a 17 game simulcast agreement.

In September 2024, the St. Louis Blues announced that four of its five preseason games would stream on Victory+, with all but one of the broadcasts featuring the Blues' radio announcers. Regular season games would remain on FanDuel Sports Network Midwest. Later, the Blues announced that three regular season games that season would exclusively stream on Victory+ and air on local Gray Media television stations.

On July 15, 2026, the Ducks announced they were ending their agreement with Victory+. Later on August 31, 2026, the Stars announced they would move their broadcasts from Victory+ to Amazon Prime Video.

==== High school football (2025) ====
In June 2025, Victory+ acquired the rights to the University Interscholastic League (UIL) high school football championships, also replacing FanDuel Sports Network. The service streamed the 12 divisional championship games, as well as up to 20 playoff games per-season. The possibility of a regular season "game of the week" package was also explored, planned broadcasts in 2026 were cancelled as a result of Victory+'s dissolution.

==== National Women's Soccer League (2026) ====
In 2026, Victory+ announced local agreements with Bay FC, Washington Spirit, Orlando Pride, Gotham FC and Angel City FC of the National Women's Soccer League. Victory+ will exclusively air a limited number of matches for each team in local markets.

On July 30, 2026, the NWSL terminated their rights agreement with Victory+ over missed rights payments and will now air future games on the NWSL's streaming service, NWSL+.

==== Women's National Basketball Association (2026) ====
In 2026, Victory+ announced local agreements with the Minnesota Lynx and the Atlanta Dream. The Lynx deal was an exclusive agreement, while Dream games aired on television through Gray Media. With the dissolution of Victory+ in September 2026, the Lynx would announce that their last regional broadcast would air on WFTC within the Minneapolis-St. Paul market.

== Notable staff ==
=== Current ===
- Josh Bogorad - Stars play-by-play commentator
- Daryl "Razor" Reaugh - Stars color commentator
- Brien Rea - Stars studio analyst
- Brent Severyn - Stars studio analyst

=== Former ===
- John Ahlers - Ducks play-by-play commentator
- Brian Hayward - Ducks color commentator
- Aly Lozoff - Ducks rink-side reporter
- Guy Hebert - Ducks studio analyst
- Dave Raymond - Rangers play by play
- David Murphy - Rangers color commentator
- Laura Stickells - Rangers field reporter
- Jared Sandler - Rangers studio host
- Mark McLemore - Rangers studio analyst
