= FanDuel Sports Network Southwest =

Texan regional sports network

- Type: Regional sports network
- Country: United States
- Broadcast area: Texas; Arkansas; Northern Louisiana; Eastern New Mexico; Nationwide (via satellite)
- Network: FanDuel Sports Network
- Headquarters: Irving, Texas

Programming
- Language: English
- Picture format: 720p (HDTV); 480i (SDTV)

Ownership
- Owner: Main Street Sports Group; Spurs Sports & Entertainment
- Sister channels: FanDuel Sports Network Oklahoma

History
- Launched: January 4, 1983
- Closed: September 30, 2026 (5 days ago)
- Former names: Home Sports Entertainment (1983–1995); Prime Sports Southwest (1995–1996); Fox Sports Southwest (1996–2000, 2008-2021); Fox Sports Net Southwest (2000–2004); FSN Southwest (2004–2008); Bally Sports Southwest (2021–2024)

Links
- Website: www.fanduelsportsnetwork.com

FanDuel Sports Network Southwest was a Texas-based regional sports network owned by Main Street Sports Group (formerly Diamond Sports Group) and operates as an affiliate of FanDuel Sports Network, in conjunction with the San Antonio Spurs. The channel broadcast regional coverage of professional, collegiate and high school sports events throughout the South Central United States. The network was headquartered in the Dallas-Fort Worth suburb of Irving, Texas, with master control hubbed at FanDuel Sports Network's operations center in Atlanta, which houses master control operations for its regional networks in the Southeastern United States.

FanDuel Sports Network Southwest was available on cable providers throughout much of Texas, Arkansas, Louisiana, and New Mexico; it is also available nationwide on satellite via DirecTV.

== History ==
Fox Sports Southwest logo, used from 2008 to 2012.

FanDuel Sports Network Southwest originally launched on January 4, 1983, as Home Sports Entertainment (HSE), a unit of Warner-Amex Cable. As one of the first regional sports networks in North America, it served as the cable television home of professional and collegiate sports teams throughout Texas and surrounding states. In 1988, HSE became an affiliate of Prime Sports Networks.

Like many Prime Sports-affiliated networks, it shared channel space with other networks on several cable providers in its service area (most often resulting in its programming being restricted to nighttime periods) until the early 1990s, when cable systems began upgrading their headend infrastructures to increase channel capacity, reassigning most of the cable channels that shared time with HSE to other channel slots once these upgrades were complete. In 1994, Liberty Media acquired HSE, converting it into an owned-and-operated affiliate of Prime Sports and changing its name to Prime Sports Southwest.

In 1996, News Corporation, which formed its own sports division for the Fox network two years earlier, acquired a 50% interest in the Prime Network from Liberty Media; the network was officially rebranded as Fox Sports Southwest on November 1 of that year, as part of a relaunch of the Prime Network affiliates as the cornerstones of the new Fox Sports Net. The channel was then rebranded as Fox Sports Net Southwest in 2000, as part of a collective brand modification of the FSN networks under the "Fox Sports Net" banner.

In 2004, the channel shortened its name to FSN Southwest, through the networks' de-emphasis of the brand, before reverting to the Fox Sports Southwest moniker in 2008. In 2007, a high definition simulcast feed of Fox Sports Southwest, which broadcasts in the 720p format was launched. Initially, the channel did not provide a 24-hour simulcast but it broadcast various Mavericks (prior to the 2024–25 NBA season), Rangers (prior to 2025), Spurs and Stars games (prior to July 6, 2024), as well as several NCAA football and basketball games shown nationally on FSN and other programming distributed nationally by Fox Sports Networks in high definition. Today, nearly all programming is shown in HD. In July 2013, News Corporation spun off the Fox Sports Networks and most of its other U.S. entertainment properties into 21st Century Fox.

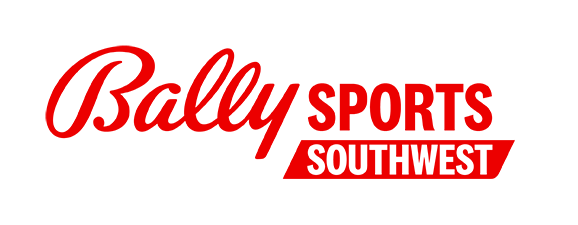
Former logo as Bally Sports Southwest, used from 2021 to 2024

On December 14, 2017, The Walt Disney Company announced plans to acquire all 22 regional Fox Sports networks from 21st Century Fox as part of their acquisition of Fox, including Fox Sports Southwest. However, on June 27, 2018, the Justice Department ordered their divestment under antitrust grounds, citing Disney's ownership of ESPN (ESPN also owned a stake in the Longhorn Network until its shutdown on June 30, 2024). On May 3, 2019, Sinclair Broadcast Group and Entertainment Studios (through their joint venture, Diamond Holdings) bought Fox Sports Networks from The Walt Disney Company for $10.6 billion. The deal closed on August 22, 2019, thus placing Fox Sports Southwest in common ownership with 17 Sinclair stations in Texas. On November 17, 2020, Sinclair announced an agreement with casino operator Bally's Corporation to serve as a new naming rights partner for the FSN channels. Sinclair announced the new Bally Sports branding for the channels on January 27, 2021. On March 31, 2021, coinciding with the 2021 Major League Baseball season, Fox Sports Southwest was rebranded as Bally Sports Southwest.

=== Bankruptcy ===
On February 15, 2023, Diamond Sports Group, the owner of Bally Sports Southwest, failed to make a $140 million interest payment, instead opting for a 30-day grace period to make the payment. On March 14, 2023, Diamond Sports Group filed for Chapter 11 bankruptcy protection.

During its bankruptcy, Diamond missed a payment to the Texas Rangers. On April 5, 2023, the Rangers filed an emergency motion asking the bankruptcy judge to order Diamond to pay the Rangers fully or give its media rights back to Major League Baseball. Diamond argued that because of cord-cutting the contract rate for the media rights of the teams was too high. A hearing on the matter was set for May 31, 2023. As an interim, on April 19, the bankruptcy judge ordered Diamond Sports to pay 50% of what the Rangers were owed. On June 1, 2023, after a two day long hearing, the bankruptcy judge ordered Diamond to pay the Rangers fully within five days.

On July 3, 2024, Diamond Sports Group filed a motion requesting that its contract with the Dallas Stars be terminated. On July 8, the Stars subsequently announced that it would partner with A Parent Media Co. to stream all of its games for free via the team-run streaming service Victory+ beginning in the 2024–25 season.

On August 23, 2024, Diamond Sports Group terminated its contract with the Dallas Mavericks prior to the 2024–25 NBA season. On September 6, 2024, the Mavericks had reached a multi-year deal with Tegna to broadcast their regionally televised games over-the-air on either WFAA (Channel 8) or KFAA-TV (Channel 29, previously KMPX). In addition to the deal, 15 games will be simulcast on both WFAA and KFAA-TV.

On October 6, 2024, The Texas Rangers ended their agreement with Diamond Sports Group, with the team searching for options to broadcast its games, including the possible creation of their own regional sports network, for the 2025 MLB season. Prior to their departure, the Rangers owned a 10% equity stake in the network. On January 15, 2025, the Rangers and A Parent Media Co. reached a multiyear deal to stream its games on Victory+, with a subscription of $100 per season. Later on January 27, the Rangers announced the creation of their own regional sports network dubbed Rangers Sports Network, which will produce and distribute game broadcasts. Two days later, the Rangers reached an agreement with Nexstar Media Group and Gray Media to broadcast 15 games over-the-air, the first time the club has included OTA games since 2014. In the DFW area, the 15 games will be broadcast on KDAF (CW33).

On October 16, 2024, it was revealed in a court filing that Diamond had reached a new sponsorship agreement with FanDuel Group, under which it intended to rebrand Bally Sports as the FanDuel Sports Network; on October 18, 2024, Diamond officially announced the rebranding, which took effect October 21. Under the agreement, FanDuel has the option to take a minority equity stake of up to 5% once Diamond Sports exits bankruptcy. The branding is downplayed during programming related to high school sports.

== Programming ==
FanDuel Sports Network Southwest holds the exclusive regional cable television rights to the San Antonio Spurs of the NBA. In addition, the channel once held the cable rights to the University Interscholastic League, carrying its Class 6A high school state championship games for football, boys' and girls' basketball, baseball and softball, and the 2A-5A high school football championships. Prior to their move to Las Vegas, FanDuel Sports Network Southwest had the rights to the San Antonio Stars of the WNBA. Prior to their move to Henderson, FanDuel Sports Network Southwest also carried select games from the San Antonio Rampage of the AHL.

A mix of programs originally supplied by FanDuel Sports Network and some original programming exclusive to FanDuel Sports Network Southwest (such as High School Spotlight, ″High School Scoreboard Live″ and the Dallas Morning News-co-produced SportsdayOnAir) are also broadcast. As part of the naming rights deal with FanDuel, select programs from FanDuel TV would be shown on the network.

=== Coverage areas ===
FanDuel Sports Network Southwest has the second-largest market area and total viewer reach of any network in the FanDuel regional networks group (behind FanDuel Sports Network South). Its expansive footprint extends from eastern New Mexico to Panama City, Florida. The network is divided into four broadcasting zones, each representing the five largest television markets in its designated broadcast region:

- Dallas-Fort Worth (including northern and north-central Texas, parts of West Texas, parts of East Texas, and northern Louisiana)
- Houston (southeast Texas, within the former coverage area of the defunct sub-feed Fox Sports Houston)
- San Antonio (including Austin, El Paso, southern Texas, and parts of West Texas and eastern New Mexico)
- Arkansas

The separation of broadcast zones for the channel is mostly due to the defined broadcast territories set by the National Basketball Association for four of the region's five NBA franchises – the Dallas Mavericks (prior to the 2024–25 season), Oklahoma City Thunder, San Antonio Spurs and New Orleans Pelicans (the Houston Rockets are carried on Space City Home Network). In the event of a scheduling conflict between either of the teams (such as Mavericks/Thunder, Mavericks/Spurs, Thunder/Spurs, and sometimes Mavericks/Spurs/Thunder), the games will be shown on their own subfeeds (Thunder on FanDuel Sports Network Oklahoma, Spurs or Mavericks on FanDuel Sports Network Southwest).

Zone #	Region served	MLB		NBA				NHL
Zone #	Region served	Texas Rangers (before 2025 season)	St. Louis Cardinals (FanDuel Sports Network Midwest)	Dallas Mavericks (before 2024 season)	San Antonio Spurs	Memphis Grizzlies (FanDuel Sports Network Southeast)	Oklahoma City Thunder (FanDuel Sports Network Oklahoma)	Dallas Stars (before 2024 season)
1	Dallas–Fort Worth	Yes	No	Yes	No	No	No	Yes
2	Houston	Yes	No	No	No	No	No	Yes
3	San Antonio	Yes	No	No	Yes	No	No	Yes
4	Arkansas	Yes	Yes	Yes	No	Yes	Yes	Yes

== Other services ==
=== FanDuel Sports Network Southwest Extra ===
FanDuel Sports Network Southwest Extra (previously branded as "Bally Sports Southwest Plus") is an alternate channel feed of FanDuel Sports Network Southwest used to broadcast select events from teams to which FanDuel Sports Network Southwest holds the broadcast rights within the designated market in the event that two or more games scheduled to be broadcast on the channel are held simultaneously, requiring the overflow feed to carry games that cannot air on the main feed.

=== FanDuel Sports Network Southwest streaming options ===
FanDuel Sports Network Southwest is not available on streaming services such as Sling, YouTubeTV, or Hulu + live TV, though it is still available on FuboTV and DirecTV Stream only on the Choice package and above.
