= Kidoodle.TV =

Canadian and American streaming platform

- Logo
- Website type: Streaming platform
- Available in: English
- Headquarters: Calgary, Alberta, Canada
- Country of origin: Canada
- Area served: 160 countries
- Parent: A Parent Media Co. Inc
- Website: https://kidoodle.tv/
- Launched: January 2014; 12 years ago
- Current status: Active

Kidoodle.TV is a Canadian subscription and ad-based video-on-demand streaming service for children. It is owned and operated by A Parent Media Co. Inc., a company based in Calgary, Alberta. It provides entertainment and educational programs for children, and it is available in English. Notable shows on the platform include PAW Patrol, Peppa Pig, SpongeBob SquarePants (Nickelodeon), Baby Shark, My Little Pony, The Donkey Kong Show, and Doggyland.

Kidoodle.TV was created in 2012 and launched in January 2014. As of 2023, it can be accessed in more than 160 countries (such as the US) through more than 1000 devices.

On August 31, 2026, Kidoodle.TV began the process of liquidation along with the rest of A Parent Media Co. The liquidation was triggered by financial problems tied to its sister platform Victory+, a sports streaming platform.

== History ==
Kidoodle.TV is owned and operated by A Parent Media Co. Inc., a company based in Calgary, Alberta, Canada. Kidoodle.TV was first started by Mike Lowe and Neil Gruninger. Lowe identified a gap for online, user-generated videos providing age-appropriate content for children up to 12, and co-founded the platform in 2012 with Gruninger. They commercially launched the service in North America circa January 2014. The service also allows parental control and setting-up of watch time limit.

In 2020, the company partnered with PubMatic to use their ad-tech software OpenWrap OTT for header bidding. In 2021, Kidoodle.TV launched an analytics portal for content creators to inform them about the presentation of their shows. It also partnered with YouTube Channel (Argentina), The Children’s Kingdom, in June 2023.

The company has approved Amazon's cloud computing for technical advancements in their services and operations.

=== Funding ===
In 2014, Kidoodle.TV raised CAD 10 million from angel investors. In June 2022, the company received capital investment from TriWest Capital Partners, a Calgary-based private equity firm making the total funds raised by the company to $62 million.

== Awards ==
Notable awards won by Kidoodle.TV includes:

- Webby Awards – 2022, 2025
- Stevie Awards – Gold - 2020
- Cynopsis Media's annual Media Impact Awards - 2025
