= Rangers Sports Network =

Regional sports network operated by the Texas Rangers

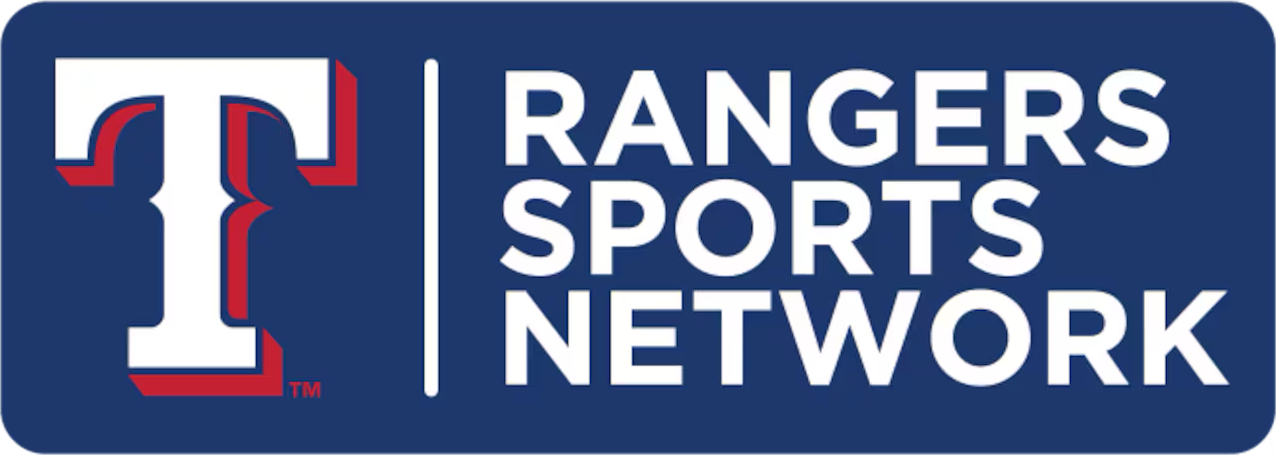
- Type: Regional sports network

Ownership
- Owner: Rangers Sports Media & Entertainment Company (Texas Rangers)
- Key people: Chairman: Neil Leibman

The Rangers Sports Network (RSN) is a part-time regional sports network owned by Rangers Sports Media & Entertainment, the media division of the Texas Rangers of Major League Baseball.

Since the 2025 Rangers season, RSN has produced and broadcast the team's regional games, succeeding Bally Sports Southwest. Similarly to MLB Local Media, its game broadcasts are distributed via ad-hoc arrangements with television providers within the Rangers' regional footprint, while the social sports platform Bzzr hosts direct to consumer (DTC) and TV Everywhere streaming options. RSN also syndicates a package of games throughout the season to a network of Gray Media and Nexstar broadcast television stations.

== History ==
The Texas Rangers were one of several Dallas teams impacted by the bankruptcy of Diamond Sports Group (now Main Street Sports Group), the owner of the Bally Sports (now FanDuel Sports Network) regional sports networks. The team's contract with Diamond's Bally Sports Southwest expired following the 2024 season, and was not renewed. Diamond also opted out of its contracts with the NBA's Dallas Mavericks and NHL's Dallas Stars, leading to both teams adopting new distribution models for their regional broadcasts; the Mavs partnered with Tegna Inc. and Endeavor Streaming to air its games on KFAA-TV and a direct-to-consumer (DTC) streaming service known as MavsTV, while the Stars partnered with A Parent Media Co. to launch Victory+, a free service that would stream the team's games.

The Rangers were reported to be pursuing the distribution of games via multiple platforms, including a streaming platform and ad-hoc agreements with local television providers; this "direct-to-distributor" model would be similar to MLB Local Media, except that the telecasts would be produced in-house by the team rather than by Major League Baseball. Ahead of official announcements, the Rangers announced on January 15 that it had reached an agreement with Victory+ to host a DTC subscription service.

On January 27, 2025, the team officially announced that the new service would be known as the Rangers Sports Network (RSN). The team also announced the formation of a new division known as Rangers Sports Media & Entertainment. The subsidiary will house both RSN and Rev Entertainment, a sister event production and marketing firm.

On July 15, 2026, the Rangers announced that the streaming component of RSN would be dropped from Victory+ effective immediately, and move to BZZR, a startup backed by one of the Rangers' minority owners. This decision was reportedly motivated by concerns surrounding the financial stability of Victory+. RSN stated that customers would be able to migrate their subscriptions to Bzzr.

== Carriage ==
The Rangers pursued a multi-platform approach, including direct-to-consumer options, and partnerships with television providers in the team's home market. The team has reached agreements with Astound, AT&T, Charter Spectrum, DirecTV (including DirecTV Stream), GEUS Fusion TV, and Vyve Broadband, to distribute RSN to their subscribers via part-time channels.

In March 2025, Fubo announced an agreement with the Rangers Sports Network, allowing Fubo to stream all available Texas Rangers games over its service, including both pre- and post-game broadcasts.

Games stream on Bzzr, with RSN available through a paid package priced at $100 per-season, or at no additional charge to authenticated subscribers of television providers who carry RSN. The team also announced that a package of at least 15 games–mostly home games on Fridays—would be syndicated to broadcast television stations via partnerships with Gray Media and Nexstar Media Group. KDAF in Dallas will serve as the flagship station.

=== Over-the-air affiliates ===
City of license / Market	Station	Virtual channel	Primary affiliation
Alexandria, Louisiana	KLGC-LD	25.2	Gulf Coast Sports & Entertainment Network
Alexandria, Louisiana	KALB-TV	5.4	Gulf Coast Sports & Entertainment Network
Amarillo, Texas	KCPN-LD	33.1	MyNetworkTV
Austin, Texas/Llano, Texas	KBVO	14.1	MyNetworkTV
Baton Rouge, Louisiana	WBRL-CD	21.1	The CW
Dallas, Texas/Fort Worth, Texas	KDAF	33.1	The CW
El Paso, Texas	KTSM-TV	9.2	Estrella TV
Eureka Springs, Arkansas/Fort Smith, Arkansas/Fayetteville, Arkansas	KXNW	34.1	MyNetworkTV
Harlingen, Texas	KGBT-TV	4.1	MyNetworkTV
Houston, Texas	KIAH	39.1	The CW
Jonesboro, Arkansas	KAIT	8.3	The CW
Lafayette, Louisiana	KLFY-TV	10.1	CBS
Lake Charles, Louisiana	KPLC	29.2	The CW
Laredo, Texas	KXNU-LD	10.2	CBS
Lubbock, Texas	KMYL-LD	14.1	MyNetworkTV
Little Rock, Arkansas/Pine Bluff, Arkansas	KASN	38.1	The CW
Monroe, Louisiana/El Dorado, Arkansas	KARD	14.2	The CW
New Orleans, Louisiana	WNOL-TV	38.1	The CW
Odessa, Texas	KWWT	30.1	MyNetworkTV
Oklahoma City, Oklahoma	KAUT-TV	43.1	The CW
San Antonio, Texas/Fredericksburg, Texas	KCWX	2.1	MyNetworkTV
Sherman, Texas	KXII	12.2	MyNetworkTV
Shreveport, Louisiana	KSHV-TV	45.1	MyNetworkTV
Tulsa, Oklahoma/Muskogee, Oklahoma	KQCW-DT	19.1	The CW
Tyler, Texas/Longview, Texas	KTPN-LD	36.1	MyNetworkTV
Waco, Texas/Bryan, Texas	KYLE-TV	28.1	MyNetworkTV
Wichita Falls, Texas	KJBO-LD	35.1	MyNetworkTV

== Commentators ==
=== Play-by-play ===
- Dave Raymond
- Jared Sandler (Fill-in)

=== Color ===
- Mike Bacsik
- David Murphy

=== Field reporters ===
- Emily Jones
- Laura Stickells

=== Studio ===
- Jared Sandler (Host)
- Ted Emrich (Fill-in host)
- Elvis Andrus (Analyst, 40 games)
- Brad Miller (Fill-in analyst)
