= Our Lady of Mercy Catholic School =

Our Lady of Mercy Catholic School is a private, Roman Catholic elementary school (Pre-K to 8th) in Winston-Salem, North Carolina, minutes from downtown Winston-Salem. It operates under the direction of the Roman Catholic Diocese of Charlotte.

The original school was housed in Our Lady of Mercy Parish Church, in an adjacent wing on Sunnyside Avenue. The school and church moved to the former Bishop McGuinness High School site on Link Road in 2005. The current principal is Sister Geri Rogers, SSJ, a 30-year member of the OLM faculty.

== Background ==
Founded in 1953 in the Washington Park neighborhood of Winston-Salem, it was staffed by the Sisters of St. Joseph from Chestnut Hill, Philadelphia, Pennsylvania.

It is one of six Catholic elementary schools in the Piedmont Triad area.

Our Lady of Mercy was named one of the nation's top schools and given the National Blue Ribbon School designation for 2010, Page 143.

== Notable graduates ==
Former University of Virginia, All-ACC Conference Safety, football player Tony Covington, graduated from Our Lady of Mercy and later went on to play for five years for the Tampa Bay Buccaneers of the National Football League. Covington also played for the Seattle Seahawks and Tampa Bay Storm.

Current Commissioner of Athletics for the South Atlantic Conference, Patrick Britz, graduated from Our Lady of Mercy in 1983. He attended Bishop McGuiness High School, then in Winston-Salem. Britz went on to UNC-Asheville to play soccer for four years. While at UNC-A he was named an all-conference academic selection four years and finished his career as the second leading scorer in Bobcats history. Previously he worked for the NCAA Div-I for three years, and at Texas Tech for five years, both in high level compliance administration. Britz was named into the UNC-Asheville Athletics Hall of Fame in February, 2007. He is co-author of the book Athletic Scholarships for Dummies, published in 2005. Britz was inducted into the Bishop McGuinness Catholic High School Athletic Hall of Fame on October 7, 2011.

Geneticist and researcher Stephen N. White, Ph.D, current adjunct professor at Washington State University, is a 1990 graduate of Our Lady of Mercy. Dr. White earned a Bachelor of Science from Duke University, and a Masters and Ph.D. from Texas A&M. He has done post-doctoral work with the United States Agricultural Department. The two principal focuses of his work are ovine progressive pneumonia virus and transmissible spongiform encephalopathies.

== Notes and references ==
- http://www.nfl.com/player/tonycovington/2500216/profile
- http://thesac.com/about/directory/bios/britz?view=bio
- http://vmp.vetmed.wsu.edu/people/faculty/white
- https://www.researchgate.net/profile/Stephen_White4
