= Dave Raymond =

American sportscaster (born 1972)

- Born: August 12, 1972 (age 54); Gering, Nebraska, U.S.
- Education: Stanford University (Scholar Athlete)
- Occupation: Sportscaster
- Years active: 1995–present
- Employer: Rangers Sports Network
- Spouse: Tish Raymond
- Children: 3

Dave Raymond (born August 12, 1972) is an American sportscaster. He is the primary television play-by-play announcer for the Texas Rangers of Major League Baseball. He has also worked for the San Francisco Giants (2003), Baltimore Orioles (2005), and Houston Astros (2006 to 2012).

== Career ==
=== Business reporter ===
A former business reporter for Forbes magazine, Raymond was nominated for the prestigious 2001 Loeb Award for Outstanding Business Reporting. His article about accounting irregularities at Microstrategy in early 2000 initiated the eventual stock market correction. An article in The Washington Post cited his story as the impetus for the Internet bubble bursting. "This one popped the bubble," wrote James Cramer, columnist for TheStreet.com. "MicroStrategy forever changed the Internet mania."

=== Baseball announcer ===
Raymond's experience includes minor league stops with the independent Brockton Rox (2005), Triple-A Iowa Cubs (2000–2004), Single-A Charleston RiverDogs (1999), and the independent Sonoma County Crushers (1995–1998). According to a story in the April 20, 2000, issue of Sports Illustrated, Raymond was traded from the minor league Charleston RiverDogs to the independent league St. Paul Saints for a "case of crab cakes and a pound of shrimp." A 2019 bio in The Athletic has a different version: "Raymond became the second baseball broadcaster in history to be traded. [Mike] Veeck’s young daughter Rebecca was going blind, so he traded Raymond and a case of crab cakes to the Saints for a wind machine and the announcing tandem of Jim Lucas and Don Wardlow, who was completely blind." Either way, Raymond took a job with the Iowa Cubs before he could report to his new club.

Raymond worked as a fill-in announcer for the Giants in 2003 and the Orioles in 2005. He and Brett Dolan were hired by the Astros beginning in the 2006 season to work with Milo Hamilton. Raymond was recommended for the Astros job by Jon Miller. Miller, who broadcasts for the Giants and, formerly ESPN Sunday Night Baseball, said Raymond "is a radio guy. He understands the medium. He understands how to paint a picture of the game, and that's his first priority." Raymond additionally co-hosted the J.D. and Dave's Excellent Offseason Adventure each week during the 2008/2009 off-season with former pitcher and broadcaster Jim Deshaies on 790 AM KBME in Houston.

Raymond left the Astros after the 2012 season. He called games on MLB.com from 2013 to 2016. He began calling Texas Rangers games on television and radio during the 2016 season as fill-in announcer. In 2017, he became the primary television play-by-play announcer.

=== College sports announcer ===
Raymond called four seasons of Stanford University women's basketball (1998–2001) as well as two seasons (1995–96) with Stanford women’s volleyball. He also spent parts of four years providing television and radio play-by-play for several Drake University football and men's basketball games as well as radio for women's basketball games (2002–2005).

After the 2011 baseball season, Raymond broadcast several sports on ESPN's newly launched Longhorn Network in Austin, Texas. He handled play-by-play for University of Texas men's and women's basketball games, as well as UT baseball (fall) and softball (fall/spring). Raymond teamed with Bruce Bowen on men's basketball broadcasts, and worked with Debbie Antonelli and Fran Harris during women's basketball games. For softball games, he partnered with Cat Osterman, Amanda Scarborough, or Megan Willis. His baseball partner was Greg Swindell in the fall.

Beginning in 2012, Raymond worked college basketball and football games for ESPN3, primarily covering SMU men's basketball with analyst Stephen Howard.

In 2022, Raymond called Stanford football games on KTCT.

== Personal life ==
A native of Gering, Nebraska, Raymond served as Senior Class President at Stanford University while competing for the varsity track and field team. He earned distinction as a Scholar Athlete.

Raymond met his wife, Tish, after college. They have three children.
