= Bzzr =

Bzzr is a sports-oriented website and new media platform launched in April 2026.

== History ==
Bzzr quietly launched in April 2026. The company was founded by Jeff Bookout, while Neil Leibman—a minority stakeholder in the Texas Rangers of Major League Baseball, and chairman of the team's broadcasting arm Rangers Sports Media and Entertainment—serves as a director.

In June 2026, Bzzr hired former Turner Broadcasting general manager and X head of content, talent, and brand sales Brett Weitz as CEO.

In July 2026 during the All-Star break, the Texas Rangers announced that they would relocate the Rangers Sports Network's (RSN) regional in-market streaming service from Victory+ to Bzzr effective immediately, with subscriptions transferring to the new service. The team cited concerns over Victory+'s financial stability as an impetus for the abrupt move.

The transition to Bzzr faced criticism from viewers due to the platform's relative lack of platform support (particularly on smart TVs) in comparison to Victory+ at launch, to the point that RSN had to disable the live chat on its streams due to viewers using it to criticize the transition, and Bzzr recommended that users cast the stream from another device using Apple AirPlay and Google Cast absent native apps for their particular smart TV platform. After primarily launching with Amazon Fire TV support, Bzzr later announced forthcoming plans for Roku and webOS apps.

== Features and content ==
Bzzr primarily operates as a social networking service, aiming to serve as an "always-on" platform for sports fandom without off-topic distractions. It carries a news feed of syndicated sports news, video (including long-form content, and short-form videos known as "Hypes"), and podcasts, with content partners at launch including Sports Illustrated, The Players' Tribune, and Locked On Podcast Network among others, as well as posts from sports figures and teams. Bzzr uses a proprietary "Sports Graph" to personalize users' feeds, and to parse content for natural language queries in its search engine.

=== Event coverage ===
Bzzr offers live streaming of selected sporting events, through either free ad-supported or subscription-based services. The broadcasts offer social media features, such as a live chat.

In July 2026, Bzzr became the streaming provider of the Texas Rangers' Rangers Sports Network, hosting a direct-to-consumer subscription carrying the team's non-national games.

On August 22, 2026, the Los Angeles Rams of the National Football League announced an agreement with Bzzr to stream its remaining two preseason games in-market for free on the service. The agreement also includes content partnerships with The Players' Tribune, which produced streaming post-game shows for the two games, and will produce a weekly Rams podcast for Bzzr throughout the season.
