= Blessed Sacrament School (Burlington, North Carolina) =

Location
- 515 Hillcrest Avenue; Burlington, North Carolina 27215; United States
- 36°05′43″N 79°26′28″W

Information
- Established: 1935 (91 years ago)
- Principal: Maria I. Gomez (2012–present)
- Colors: Blue and gold
- Mascot: The Knight
- Website: bssknights.org

Blessed Sacrament School is a privately funded Roman Catholic school located in Burlington, North Carolina.

== History ==
Blessed Sacrament School was founded in 1935 when Colonel James H. Holt Jr. used his own house to open a school that could accommodate 25 students. Then in 1951 the school was moved to a building at 400 West Davis Street. Less than 44 years later the school moved again to its current home at 515 Hillcrest Avenue. The building was previously occupied by Hillcrest Elementary School. The school is member of National Catholic Educational Association and is currently accredited by Southern Association of Colleges and Schools.

== Awards and achievements ==
Blessed Sacrament School received the Blue Ribbon Award for the year of 2003.
