= FanDuel Sports Network =

Defunct American regional sports network group

- Type: Regional sports network group
- Country: United States
- Broadcast area: Available in most markets (through regional affiliates)

Programming
- Language: English
- Picture format: 720p (HDTV)

Ownership
- Owner: Diamond Sports Group/Main Street Sports Group
- Key people: Alvin Kwan (SVP, Strategy and Business Operations)
- Sister channels: FanDuel TV; FanDuel Racing; ABTV; Marquee Sports Network; YES Network

History
- Launched: March 31, 2021 (5 years ago)
- Replaced: Fox Sports Networks
- Closed: September 30, 2026 (52 days ago)
- Former names: Bally Sports (2021–2024)

FanDuel Sports Network, formerly Bally Sports, was a group of regional sports networks in the United States that carried regional broadcasts of sporting events from various professional, collegiate, and high school sports teams. Through its owned-and-operated networks and several other affiliates, its programming was available to all or part of at least 33 states.

They were successors to the Fox Sports Networks, which were created, owned and operated by News Corporation for most of their existence until its rebranding on June 28, 2013 to 21st Century Fox and the spin-off of its news publishing assets into a new News Corp. The Walt Disney Company acquired 21st Century Fox on March 20, 2019, but divested the Fox Sports regional networks to Sinclair Broadcast Group-Allen Media Group subsidiary Diamond Sports Group on August 22, 2019 by order of the Justice Department owing to Disney's majority-ownership of ESPN and antitrust concerns about potential consolidation. Diamond sold naming rights to the channels to casino operator Bally's Corporation, relaunching as Bally Sports on March 31, 2021 and ending the Fox Sports Networks branding after almost 25 years. Diamond Sports Group filed for Chapter 11 bankruptcy protection in mid-2023, during which it began to lose some of its sports rights to competing broadcast television, streaming and part-time "direct-to-distributor" operators.

Diamond rebranded the channels as the FanDuel Sports Network following a fresh deal, exited bankruptcy and rebranded as the Main Street Sports Group on January 2, 2025. By the beginning of the following year, Main Street suffered from more financial difficulties, with unsuccessful attempts to sell the company to DAZN, and the nine Major League Baseball teams under contract with Main Street terminating their agreements due to missed rights payments.

In February 2026, the company began to issue notices of dismissals and closures under the WARN Act. The following month, the Los Angeles Angels announced an agreement to buy out Main Street's ownership in FDSN West and continue it as a team-owned RSN, rebranding it to ABTV from May 1. Main Street confirmed that it would begin to close FDSN following the conclusions of the 2025–26 NBA and NHL seasons; with the final live FDSN-produced sporting event being an NHL playoff game on April 30. Since then, some television providers had removed the channels from their lineups.

FDSN ceased all operations on September 30, 2026 and its website went offline on October 5 the same year.

== History ==
=== Beginnings ===
The networks of the FanDuel Sports Network originate from several of the networks dating to the 1980s and 1990s, as affiliates of the Prime Network (and to a lesser degree SportsChannel). In 1996, News Corporation and Liberty Media (the owner of Prime Network) announced that the Prime Sports networks would be rebranded under the new "Fox Sports Net" brand; the Prime Sports-branded affiliates were relaunched as Fox Sports Net on November 1, 1996. In 1997, News Corp and Liberty Media also purchased a 40% stake in Cablevision/NBC's SportsChannel networks which led those networks being rebranded as part of Fox Sports Net in early 1998 and bringing the total number of owned or affiliate networks to 18. In the years that followed, a series of other acquisitions and launches of new networks (along with a few closures) resulted in 22 owned and operated networks. News Corporation changed name to 21st Century Fox and spun-off its publishing and Australian media assets into a new News Corporation, or simply News Corp, on June 28, 2013.

=== Acquisition by Diamond Sports Group from Disney ===
On December 14, 2017, the Walt Disney Company announced their intent to acquire 21st Century Fox for $52.4 billion after the spin-off of certain businesses into a new entity (Fox Corporation). While the acquisition was originally slated to include Fox Sports' regional operations (which presumably would have been realigned with Disney's ESPN division), the Justice Department ordered that they be divested within 90 days of the completion of the acquisition due to the concentration of the market that ESPN would hold.

Sinclair Broadcast Group was mentioned as the most likely buyer for the other FSN networks, but would need the assistance of a private equity firm to help raise the cash needed for the purchase. The group's other sports properties included Stadium, a national sports network distributed via over-the-air digital television and internet streaming (in partnership with the Chicago White Sox's investment arm Silver Chalice), Tennis Channel, as well as Marquee, a then-upcoming RSN devoted to the Chicago Cubs.

On May 3, Sinclair announced that, via its subsidiary Diamond Sports Group, it had agreed to purchase the networks for $10.6 billion, pending regulatory approval. At the same time, it was also revealed that Allen Media Group would hold an equity stake in the company and serve as a "content partner". At the time the acquisition, FSN held exclusive broadcasting rights to 42 professional teams (including 16 from the NBA, 14 from MLB and 12 from the NHL), and the channels collectively generated $3.8 billion in 2018, across nearly 75 million subscribers.

The sale was completed on August 22, 2019, and included 21 of the 22 networks. The networks continued to temporarily use the Fox Sports branding under a transitional license agreement with Fox Corporation; Sinclair CEO Chris Ripley stated that there were plans to eventually rebrand them under either a new name or to "partner with a brand that wants more exposure". There were also plans to increase non-event programming and emphasize sports betting in its programming.

Due to a clause in the original sale, Yankee Global Enterprises had a right of first refusal to purchase Fox's share in YES Network should Fox be sold to Disney. On August 29, 2019, an investor group including the Yankees, Sinclair, Amazon, and Blackstone purchased Disney's 80% stake in the network for $3.47 billion. Sinclair continued to hold a 20% share of the network.

FuboTV removed the channels in January 2020, and YouTube TV and Hulu + Live TV followed in October 2020. On November 4, 2020, Sinclair took a $4.23 billion write-down on the FSN purchase, citing "goodwill and definite-lived intangible assets, and $13 million of non-recurring costs for transaction, COVID, legal, litigation and regulatory costs."

=== Rebranding as Bally Sports ===
On November 17, 2020, Sportico reported that Sinclair was considering rebranding the networks via a naming rights agreement, and was reportedly in talks with multiple companies involved in sports betting. The next day, Sinclair announced that it had entered into an agreement with casino operator Bally's Corporation to acquire the naming rights under a ten-year deal. This agreement included integration of Bally's content on the channels and other Sinclair properties (including its television stations, Stadium, and Tennis Channel), and a warrant giving Sinclair the option to acquire a 14.9% stake in Bally's Corporation, and up to 24.9% if performance criteria were met.

On January 27, 2021, Sinclair announced that the networks would be rebranded as Bally Sports on March 31. Fox Sports Carolinas and Fox Sports Tennessee were discontinued, with any unique sports programming moved to the Bally Sports South and Southeast channels. To better reflect their target markets, Prime Ticket and SportsTime Ohio were also rebranded as Bally Sports SoCal and Bally Sports Great Lakes, respectively.

In preparation for the rebrand, new studio sets were constructed at all of FSN's outlets, while Drive Studio produced a new on-air graphics package built upon its existing work for Marquee. On-air graphics feature a new consistent score bug in the bottom-left of the screen, which is combined into the ticker; the ticker area can also be used to display in-game statistics. Executive vice president Michael Connelly explained that the configuration was designed to eventually allow for the integration of sports betting-related information such as lines and props.

Former logo as Bally Sports used from 2021 to 2024

On Opening Day, the newly rebranded channels aired a joint special, Bally Sports Big Opening Day. It was produced by Stadium, hosted by Michael Kim, Bally Sports SoCal's Kristina Pink and Bally Sports Southeast's Eric Collins, and featured coverage of teams and events across Bally Sports and Sinclair's sports networks.

On May 2, 2022, Diamond Sports Group assembled a board of five directors, consisting of Bob Whitsitt, Sinclair CEO Chris Ripley, Randy Freer, a former Fox Sports/Hulu executive, Mary Ann Turcke, a former COO of the NFL, and David Preschlack (previously president of the NBC Sports Regional Networks); Preschlack would be elected CEO of Diamond on December 5.

On June 23, 2022, Bally Sports soft-launched a direct-to-consumer service known as Bally Sports+ in selected markets. It launched nationally in the remainder of the networks on September 26.

On December 4, 2022, Diamond Sports Group's board voted to block the Sinclair Broadcast Group from operating Diamond and its regional sports networks.

=== Bankruptcy and spin-off ===
On February 15, 2023, Diamond Sports Group, the owner of Bally Sports, failed to make a $140 million interest payment, instead opting for a 30-day grace period to make the payment. On March 14, 2023, Diamond Sports Group filed for Chapter 11 bankruptcy protection; its restructuring plan included a proposal for the company to be separated from the Sinclair Broadcast Group into a standalone company. Diamond's first-lien lenders would not be affected as part of the restructuring support agreement, but other creditors planned to convert their debt into equity.

On March 20, 2023, Steve Rosenberg resigned as president of Diamond Sports Group, and chief financial officer David DeVoe was appointed to the role of COO.

On April 28, 2023, the Phoenix Suns of the NBA and Phoenix Mercury of the Women's National Basketball Association (WNBA) announced they had signed a five-year agreement with Gray Media to replace Bally Sports Arizona as its local television partners. After the announcement, Diamond Sports Group accused the team of breaching its contract and bankruptcy law, stating that the team was making an "improper effort" to "change their broadcasting partner without permitting Diamond to exercise our contractual rights." In response, Suns CEO Josh Bartlestein stated that plans with their deal would continue, describing Diamond's position as "totally inaccurate". On May 10, 2023, the bankruptcy judge voided the Suns contract with Gray, ruling that the Suns violated Diamond's contractual right of first refusal. He ordered the parties into arbitration. The Phoenix Mercury's deal was not affected. On July 14, 2023, the deal became official when Diamond declined to match Gray's contract offer.

Diamond missed a rights payment to the San Diego Padres in mid-March 2023, which was eventually made on March 29. On May 31, 2023, Diamond missed a second payment to the team; as Bally Sports San Diego was a joint venture between the Padres and Diamond, it was technically not in bankruptcy, and this missed payment did not have the same bankruptcy protections that Diamond's other missed payments had. As a result, the Padres' media rights were returned to Major League Baseball effective immediately, and the team became the first to move its regional games to the league's new in-house broadcasting unit MLB Local Media.

On June 1, 2023, after a two-day-long hearing, the bankruptcy judge ordered Diamond to pay the other Major League Baseball teams their missed payments in full within five days. On June 14, 2023, Diamond rejected its contract with Raycom Sports to distribute a package of Atlantic Coast Conference games, freeing Raycom to sell the package to other networks. A month later, Raycom announced that The CW had acquired the rights.

On June 22, 2023, Diamond announced its intention to reject its contract with the Arizona Diamondbacks on June 30, 2023. Diamond and the Arizona Diamondbacks later released a joint statement delaying the hearing and agreeing to continue Diamond's broadcast of Diamondbacks' games. The contract was officially rejected on July 18. As with the Padres, the team moved to MLB Local Media effective immediately.

On September 28, 2023, the New York Post and Next TV reported that Diamond Sports had reached one-year carriage agreements with DirecTV and Comcast prior to their restructuring deadline. On September 29, Diamond Sports requested a 60-day extension to file their reorganization plan. On October 11, 2023, Major League Baseball filed a notice opposing Diamond Sports' request for an extension. MLB also asked the bankruptcy court to force Diamond to decide on whether the company would air games from the Atlanta Braves, Cleveland Guardians, Detroit Tigers, Milwaukee Brewers and Texas Rangers in 2024.

On October 1, 2023, Diamond Sports missed a payment to the NBA's Orlando Magic. On October 4, 2023, Diamond announced that it intended to reject its contract with the Arizona Coyotes. The next day, the E. W. Scripps Company announced it had acquired the rights, and that the games would air on KASW. As a result, with no remaining professional sports rights, Bally Sports Arizona was shut down on October 21, 2023. On October 10, 2023, Diamond announced that it intended to reject its contract with the Orange Bowl for its Orange Bowl Classic men's college basketball tournament.

In November 2023, the bankruptcy court approved a plan negotiated between Diamond and the NBA, under which Diamond would maintain the regional rights to its NBA teams without disruption through the conclusion of the 2023–24 NBA season, in exchange for a 16% reduction in rights fees, and the contracts expiring following the end of the season. The teams would also be allowed to sell packages of ten games each to exclusively air on broadcast television stations. On December 20, 2023, Diamond Sports reached a similar agreement with the NHL for the eleven teams under contract with Bally Sports, pending approval by the bankruptcy court.

On January 17, 2024, Diamond Sports announced a restructuring agreement after tentatively securing a $115 million investment from Amazon, which would result in a 15% share of the company, and reaching an agreement with the Sinclair Broadcast Group for a $495 million cash payment to settle an earlier lawsuit. On January 26, 2024, a committee of unsecured creditors objected to the restructuring agreement, arguing that financing in the restructuring agreement did not have the committee's best interests in mind. The restructuring agreement superseded the prior agreements with the NHL and NBA, meaning that Diamond's contracts with teams from those leagues would not expire after the 2023–2024 season.

On February 2, 2024, Diamond Sports announced announced that it had renegotiated with the Texas Rangers, Cleveland Guardians, and Minnesota Twins to maintain rights to the teams for the 2024 MLB season. Similarly to the previous NBA and NHL agreements, the teams would take a reduced rights fee, and have their contracts expire at the conclusion of the season. Diamond Sports Group officially filed its reorganization plan on March 1, 2024. As part of the plan, Diamond would end its naming rights deal with Bally's Corporation and rebrand its networks by the end of the 2024 MLB season.

On May 1, 2024, cable companies Xfinity and Midco pulled the Bally Sports networks as part of a carriage dispute. Optimum did the same on July 1, 2024. Comcast then reached a new carriage agreement with Xfinity on July 29, 2024. The agreement moved Bally Sports to the Xfinity "Ultimate TV" tier instead of the basic service.

On July 2, 2024, Bally Sports Florida and the Florida Panthers of the NHL mutually agreed to terminate their broadcasting contract early. That same day, the Panthers announced a new agreement with Scripps Sports. The next day on July 3, Diamond asked the court to terminate its contract with the Dallas Stars. The Stars did not object to the request, and announced an agreement to launch a new free ad-supported streaming television (FAST) platform known as Victory+ to carry its games.

On August 23, 2024, Diamond Sports announced long-term agreements with nine of its NHL teams and thirteen of its NBA teams, committing to carry at least the teams' 2024–2025 seasons, and further seasons pending the resolution of its bankruptcy; if Diamond Sports was unable to get a bankruptcy plan approved by the court, the NBA and NHL agreements would expire following the end of each league's 2024–2025 season. The agreement resulted in NHL teams having a 20 percent reduction in their rights fees and NBA teams having a 30 to 40 present reduction in their rights fees. In addition, Bally rejected its contracts with the Dallas Mavericks and New Orleans Pelicans. Three days later, it was reported that Amazon had withdrawn its plans to invest in the restructured company due to structural changes and a focus on its own national sports portfolio, but that Diamond still had enough investors to submit a "viable" restructuring plan.

While the Anaheim Ducks were initially announced by Diamond as having renewed its rights under the new agreements, on August 27 the team instead announced that it would carry its games on KCOP-TV and Victory+ under a two-year deal.

On October 2, 2024, Diamond stated that it planned to renegotiate its contracts with the Cincinnati Reds, Detroit Tigers, Kansas City Royals, Los Angeles Angels, Miami Marlins, St. Louis Cardinals, and Tampa Bay Rays. Shortly afterward, the Cleveland Guardians, Milwaukee Brewers, and Minnesota Twins all announced that they would move to MLB Local Media beginning in the 2025 Major League Baseball season, Diamond would renegotiate with the Miami Marlins and St. Louis Cardinals, with the Cardinals also having DTC rights. The Reds opted out of their contract with Diamond.

==== Rebranding as FanDuel Sports Network ====
On October 16, 2024, it was revealed in a court filing that Diamond had reached a new sponsorship agreement with FanDuel Group, under which it intends to rebrand Bally Sports as FanDuel Sports Network (FDSN); on October 18, 2024, Diamond officially announced the rebranding, which occurred on October 21. The agreement was paid for via a rights fee and advertising commitments. FanDuel Group received an option to acquire up to a 5% equity stake in Diamond after it exits bankruptcy, the right to syndicate original programming from its own cable network FanDuel TV (formerly TVG, which focused on horse racing and sports discussion programs based around sports betting), and an option to sell the FDSN direct-to-consumer service via its platforms. FanDuel president Mike Raffensperger stated that the agreement would "further cement the FanDuel brand with sports fans and provides a unique vehicle to reward our users".

A lawyer representing Major League Baseball stated that the league had shown concerns over the FanDuel agreement, including the untransparency regarding its negotiations, and concerns over league content being directly branded with the name of a sports betting company; MLB and the Atlanta Braves filed a joint objection on November 8, citing concerns over the company's future economic viability, and an absence in transparency. However, on November 13, MLB and the Braves dismissed their objection, and Diamond announced that it had successfully renegotiated with the Braves, Tigers, Angels, Marlins, Cardinals, and Rays to stay on FDSN. The Royals later renegotiated with Diamond in December, while the Brewers re-engaged with Diamond and reached an agreement to remain on FDSN rather than move to MLB Local Media.

Television rights status for teams that changed their rights during the Bally Sports bankruptcy
Team	Date of action	Status
ACC on Regional Sports Networks	March 2023, June 2023	Missed payment in March 2023. Contract terminated in June 2023, television rights returned to Raycom Sports (Sublicense acquired by The CW)
Anaheim Ducks	August 2024	Contract expired after 2023–24 season, television rights acquired by Victory+ and KCOP-TV
Arizona Coyotes	October 2023	Contract terminated prior to 2024–25 season, television rights acquired by Scripps Sports (Franchise now considered inactive). Caused Bally Sports Arizona to shut down operations in 2023.
Arizona Diamondbacks	March 2023, July 2023	Missed payment prior to 2023 MLB season, later paid. Contract terminated mid-way through 2023 MLB season, television rights returned to MLB
Atlanta Hawks	January 2024	Ten games acquired by Gray Television, remaining games on Bally Sports
Cincinnati Reds	April 2023, November 2024, January 2025	Missed payment in April 2023, later paid in full. Contract terminated following 2024 MLB season. Rights were initially acquired by MLB, but were later returned to Main Street Sports Group.
Cleveland Cavaliers	February 2024	Five games acquired by Gray Television, remaining games on FanDuel Sports Network
Cleveland Guardians	April 2023, February 2024, October 2024	Missed payment in April 2023, later paid in full. Contract renegotiated in February 2024, expired after 2024 season. Rights returned to MLB for 2025 season.
Dallas Mavericks	January 2024, August 2024	For the 2023–24 season, ten games acquired by Tegna Inc., remaining games on Bally Sports. Contract terminated prior to the 2024–25 season, television rights acquired by Tegna Inc. to air games statewide
Dallas Stars	July 2024	Contract terminated prior to the 2024–25 season, television rights acquired by Victory+
Detroit Tigers	October 2024	Contract renegotiated following 2024 MLB season
Florida Panthers	July 2024	Contract terminated prior to the 2024–25 season, television rights acquired by Scripps Sports
Kansas City Royals	December 2024	Contract renegotiated following 2024 MLB season.
Los Angeles Angels	October 2024	Contract renegotiated following 2024 MLB season
Los Angeles Kings	September 2023	Contract expired after 2022–23 season, resigned with Bally Sports with six games acquired by CBS News and Stations. Multi-year agreement.
Miami Marlins	October 2024	Contract renegotiated following 2024 MLB season
Milwaukee Brewers	October 2024	Contract expired following 2024 MLB season. Renegotiated
Milwaukee Bucks	January 2024	Ten games acquired by Weigel Broadcasting, remaining games on FanDuel Sports Network
Minnesota Twins	April 2023, February 2024, October 2024	Missed payment in April 2023, later paid in full. Contract renegotiated in February 2024, expired after 2024 season. Contract returned to MLB for 2025 season.
Missouri Valley Conference Network	September 2024	Contract expired following 2023–24 season, television rights acquired by Gray Television
New Orleans Pelicans	January 2024, August 2024	For the 2023–24 season, ten games acquired by Gray Television, remaining games on Bally Sports. For the 2024–25 season, contract terminated and television rights acquired by Gray Television, later leading to the shutdown of Bally Sports New Orleans in 2024 following Bally Sports' rebranding to the FanDuel Sports Network.
Oklahoma City Thunder	January 2024	Eight games acquired by Griffin Media, remaining games on Bally Sports
Orlando Magic	October 2023	Missed payment in October 2023, later paid in full
Phoenix Suns	July 2023	Contract expired following 2022–23 season, television rights acquired by Gray Television
San Diego Padres	March 2023, May 2023	Missed payment in March 2023, later paid. Contract terminated in May 2023, television rights returned to MLB, with Bally Sports San Diego being liquidated in April 2024 following a settlement in court with the Padres.
St. Louis Cardinals	November 2024	Contract renegotiated following 2024 MLB season, later became available direct-to-consumer via the FanDuel Sports Network app
Tampa Bay Rays	October 2024	Contract renegotiated following 2024 MLB season
Texas Rangers	October 2024, January 2025	Contract terminated following 2024 season, television rights acquired by Rangers Sports Network and Victory+

=== Post-bankruptcy, closure (2025–2026) ===
On January 2, 2025, Diamond Sports Group exited Chapter 11 bankruptcy and rebranded as Main Street Sports Group. Sinclair Broadcast Group divested its stake in its former Diamond Sports Groupcsubsidiary and a group of lenders including Hudson Bay Capital Management and PGIM became the new owners of MSSG. Shortly afterward, former ESPN producer Norby Williamson joined the company as head of production.

Diamond re-engaged with the Cincinnati Reds, and announced on January 13, 2025 that they had renewed their contract for the 2025 season. In April 2025, FDSN announced that it would premiere Golic/Golic, a studio show hosted by former ESPN personalities Mike Golic and Mike Golic Jr.; the program succeeded the GoJo and Golic show they hosted while under contract with DraftKings. The show reunited the duo with Williamson, who had overseen their Mike & Mike and Golic and Wingo shows while at ESPN. On October 27, 2025, FDSN premiered a weeknight studio show, FanDuel Sports Network Countdown Live; hosted by former ESPN anchor Stan Verrett, the program would feature previews of the night's events with contributions from personalities from the FDSN channels.

In December 2025, The Wall Street Journal reported that DAZN Group was planning to acquire a majority stake in Main Street. Afterwards, Sports Business Journal reported that Main Street had missed a payment to the St. Louis Cardinals and that the company would be forced to dissolve operations at the end of the 2025–26 NBA and NHL season if the deal with DAZN was unsuccessful by the end of January 2026. In January, Sports Business Journal reported that Main Street had missed payments to most of its NBA teams. As a result, Main Street and the teams with missed payments entered a 15-day grace period. Two days later, SBJ reported that talks with DAZN were halted and all MLB teams except the Rays had not received payments on-time.

The nine MLB teams under contract with Main Street terminated their contracts with the company in January 2026; seven of them announced in February 2026, that they would move to MLB Local Media, with the Detroit Tigers' parent company Ilitch Sports Entertainment announcing that the co-owned Detroit Red Wings would also partner with MLB Local Media for distribution via a joint "Detroit SportsNet" channel. The Atlanta Braves announced their own direct-to-distributor operation known as BravesVision in partnership with Gray Media subsidiary Raycom Sports, and on March 9, 2026, it was announced that the Los Angeles Angels had finalized an agreement to acquire FanDuel Sports Network West from Main Street outright. The Indoor Football League withdrew from an agreement that would have had a substantial portion of IFL games carried across the network. Golic/Golic was canceled, and aired its last episode on March 31; the Golics later returned to ESPN Radio in August 2026.

It was later reported that, following failures in making rights payments to its MLB, NHL, and NBA teams, Main Street Sports Group intended to close its operations after the conclusion of the 2025–26 NHL and NBA seasons, in April 2026. In February 2026, Main Street issued WARN Act notifications within each state it operates, indicating that it would begin firing its employees and permanently closing offices starting in mid-April.

On April 2, 2026, a Main Street spokesperson confirmed that, barring a "strategic transaction", the company had begun to shut down its operations; the exact timetable for each network was dependent on whether they carried an NHL team that had made the 2026 Stanley Cup playoffs, with NBA-only networks closing after the conclusion of the regular season on April 12 (in the 2025–26 season, all first round games became exclusive national broadcasts), and networks carrying NHL teams in the playoffs closing following the first round. The last FDSN-produced event aired on April 30, 2026, which featured the Minnesota Wild defeating the Dallas Stars to advance to the second round of the Stanley Cup playoffs.

Multiple television providers, including Charter Communications and Comcast, began to remove FDSN from their lineups due to the network's end of airing professional sports programming. In August 2026, Main Street sued both companies for breach of contract, alleging that the two providers had underpaid for the channels by terminating their broadcast agreements early.

FDSN reached a broadcast agreement with the American Association of Professional Baseball on July 13.

FDSN was pulled from DirecTV on or about September 28, 2026. Two days later, the FanDuel Sports Network's website posted a notification stating that the networks had ceased operations and that all programming would cease.

== Networks ==
=== Final owned-and-operated ===
Network	Region served	Formerly operated as	Notes
FanDuel Sports Network Detroit	Michigan; Northwestern Ohio; Northeastern Indiana; Northeast Wisconsin	Fox Sports Detroit (1997–2021); Bally Sports Detroit (2021–2024)	
FanDuel Sports Network Florida	Florida	SportsChannel Florida (1987–2000); Fox Sports Florida (2000–2021); Bally Sports Florida (2021–2024)	
FanDuel Sports Network Indiana	Indiana	Fox Sports Indiana (2006–2021); Bally Sports Indiana (2021–2024)	Shares programming with sister network FanDuel Sports Network Midwest
FanDuel Sports Network Kansas City	Kansas City, Missouri; Kansas	Fox Sports Kansas City (2008–2021); Bally Sports Kansas City (2021–2024)	Kansas City Royals have a minority interest. Shares programming with sister network FanDuel Sports Network Midwest.
FanDuel Sports Network Midwest	Missouri southern Illinois; Iowa; Nebraska	Prime Sports Midwest (1989–1996); Fox Sports Midwest (1996–2021); Bally Sports Midwest (2021–2024)	St. Louis Cardinals have 30% equity stake. Shares programming with sister networks FanDuel Sports Network Indiana and FanDuel Sports Network Kansas City.
FanDuel Sports Network North	Minnesota; Wisconsin; Iowa; North Dakota; South Dakota	Midwest Sports Channel (1989–2001); Fox Sports North (2001–2021); Bally Sports North (2021–2024)	
FanDuel Sports Network Ohio	Ohio; Kentucky; Eastern Indiana; Northwestern Pennsylvania; Southwestern New York parts of West Virginia	SportsChannel Ohio (1989–1998); Fox Sports Ohio (1998–2021); Bally Sports Ohio (2021–2024)	Separate subfeeds were broadcast for the Cincinnati and Cleveland markets, with the Cincinnati Reds having partial ownership in the Cincinnati feed of the network from October 2016 to October 2024.
FanDuel Sports Network Oklahoma	Oklahoma	Fox Sports Oklahoma (2008–2021); Bally Sports Oklahoma (2021–2024)	Carries programming from sister network FanDuel Sports Network Southwest
FanDuel Sports Network SoCal	Southern California; Southern Nevada; Hawaii	Fox Sports West 2 (1997–2006); Prime Ticket (2006–2021); Bally Sports SoCal (2021–2024)	
FanDuel Sports Network South	Georgia; Alabama; Kentucky; Mississippi; North Carolina; South Carolina; Tennessee	SportSouth (1990–1996); Fox Sports South (1996–2021); Bally Sports South (2021–2024)	Shares broadcast rights with sister network FanDuel Sports Network Southeast
FanDuel Sports Network Southeast	Georgia; Alabama; Mississippi; South Carolina; Tennessee; Western North Carolina	Turner South (1999–2006); SportSouth (2006–2015); Fox Sports Southeast (2015–2021); Bally Sports Southeast (2021–2024)	Shares broadcast rights with sister network FanDuel Sports Network South
FanDuel Sports Network Southwest	Texas; Arkansas northern Louisiana parts of New Mexico	Home Sports Entertainment (1983–1994); Prime Sports Southwest (1994–1996); Fox Sports Southwest (1996–2021); Bally Sports Southwest (2021–2024)	The Texas Rangers owned a 10% equity stake in the network until October 2024.
FanDuel Sports Network Sun	Florida	Sunshine Network (1988–2004); Sun Sports (2004–2015); Fox Sports Sun (2015–2021); Bally Sports Sun (2021–2024)	Shares broadcast rights with sister network FanDuel Sports Network Florida
FanDuel Sports Network Wisconsin	Wisconsin western Upper Peninsula of Michigan eastern Minnesota northwestern Illinois; Iowa	Fox Sports Wisconsin (2007–2021); Bally Sports Wisconsin (2021–2024)	Carries Minnesota Wild games and outdoor programming from FanDuel Sports Network North. Brewers obtained minority interest in 2021.

=== Affiliates ===
Network	Region served	Formerly operated as	Notes
Angels Broadcast Television	Southern California; Southern Nevada; Hawaii	Prime Ticket (1985–1994); Prime Sports West (1994–1996); Fox Sports West (1996–2021); Bally Sports West (2021–2024); FanDuel Sports Network West (2024–2026)	The Los Angeles Angels fully owns this network as a result of buying Main Street Sports Group's share in FanDuel Sports Network West in March 2026.
Marquee Sports Network	Northern and Central Illinois; Iowa; Eastern and Central Nebraska; Northern, Western and Central Indiana; Southwestern Michigan; Southeastern Wisconsin		Co-owned by Sinclair Broadcast Group and Chicago Cubs.
MSG Sportsnet/MSG Network	New York; Northern and Central New Jersey; Southeastern Connecticut; Southwestern Connecticut; Northeastern Pennsylvania	Cablevision Sports 3 (1976–1979); SportsChannel New York (1979–1998); Fox Sports Net New York (1998–2008)	Select programming airs instead on YES Network.
YES Network	New York; North and Central Jersey; Southwestern Connecticut; Northeastern Pennsylvania		Main Street Sports Group owns a minority share in the network. Select programming airs instead on MSG Sportsnet/MSG Network

=== Defunct owned-and-operated ===
Network	Region served	Formerly operated as	Notes
Bally Sports Arizona	Arizona; New Mexico; Utah; Southern Nevada	Fox Sports Arizona (1996–1999, 2008–2021); Fox Sports Net Arizona (1999–2004); FSN Arizona (2004–2008)	Shut down services on October 21, 2023, after losing airing rights to Phoenix Suns, Phoenix Mercury, Arizona Diamondbacks, and Arizona Coyotes games throughout 2023.
Bally Sports San Diego	San Diego County; Imperial County; Palm Springs Area; Las Vegas Valley; Southern Arizona; Hawaii	Fox Sports San Diego (2012–2021)	San Diego Padres owned a 20% equity stake prior to the team's withdrawal from the network on May 30, 2023. Carried programming from sister networks Bally Sports SoCal and Bally Sports West. Network was officially liquidated in April 2024 following a settlement with the Padres.
Bally Sports New Orleans	Louisiana; East Texas; South Alabama; Southern Mississippi; Florida Panhandle	Fox Sports New Orleans (2012–2021)	Shut down services on October 21, 2024, following Bally Sports' rebrand after Diamond canceled the rights for New Orleans Pelicans games alongside affiliate stations losing airing rights to Dallas Stars and Texas Rangers games in 2024.
FanDuel Sports Network Great Lakes	Ohio; Northwestern Pennsylvania; Southwestern New York parts of Kentucky and West Virginia	SportsTime Ohio (2006–2021); Bally Sports Great Lakes (2021–2024)	Closed on March 1, 2025, after Cleveland Guardians rights transferred to MLB Local Media; service never carried live sports programming under FanDuel brand.

== Former national programming ==
- U.S. Army Bowl
- Athletes Unlimited
- American Association of Professional Baseball
- Overtime Select women's basketball
- Foul Territory baseball show
- Up & Adams
- 3ICE
- Atlantic Coast Conference telecasts (including college basketball, football, soccer, lacrosse, softball, baseball and field hockey; produced by Raycom Sports in tandem with FanDuel Sports Network, these telecasts were distributed through separate agreements)
- Missouri Valley Conference telecasts (including college basketball, soccer, lacrosse, softball, baseball and field hockey games; produced by LTN Global Communications in tandem with FanDuel Sports Network, distributed exclusively in the Midwest and Southeast)
- AutoNation Orange Bowl Basketball Classic (produced by FanDuel Sports Network)
- College football games (produced by then-sister network Stadium and distributed by FanDuel Sports Network)
- College basketball games (produced by Stadium and distributed by FanDuel Sports Network)
- Golic & Golic
- Inside the Association (produced by Stadium)
- Kwik Trip Holiday Face-Off (college hockey, produced by FanDuel Sports Network)
- Ring of Honor Wrestling
- Live on the Line (produced by Stadium)
- The Rally (produced by Stadium)
- West Coast Conference men's and women's college basketball
- World Poker Tour events
- American Ninja Warrior
- Jomboy Media's Warehouse Games
- 2024 Caribbean Series
- Tennis tournaments (produced by Tennis Channel)
- Association of Volleyball Professionals (owned by Bally's Corporation)

== Related services ==
=== Direct-to-customer streaming service ===
Formerly named Bally Sports+, FanDuel Sports Network's over-the-top subscription streaming platform offers livestreams and market-specific video-on-demand content from its individual regional networks. In addition to offering live game telecasts from the FanDuel Sports Network regional networks, the service also provides game replays, team-centered studio programs, outdoor programming, and selected programs syndicated to the network's national and regional feeds.

In December 2020, Sinclair announced plans to launch a direct-to-consumer streaming service based around the linear Bally Sports networks. The service was originally targeted for a 2021 launch, though it was delayed due to Bally Sports needing to negotiate over-the-top streaming rights with the teams. Sinclair CEO Chris Ripley stated that the service was meant to target cord cutters, whom the company felt were underserved in the regional sports market.

Bally Sports+ was soft-launched on June 23, 2022, initially available to customers residing in the service areas of Bally Sports networks in Kansas City, Detroit, Florida, Wisconsin, and Florida/Sun, the five markets where Bally Sports was able to negotiate streaming rights to the local MLB team. The service launched three weeks after NESN launched NESN 360, the first DTC streaming service ever offered by an American regional sports network, on June 1.

The service, which was sold for $19.99/month or $189.99/year, uses the same infrastructure as the Bally Sports app, and was initially available on smartphones and tablet devices. Due to regional rights restrictions, the service was only available to users in markets serviced by a network owned or affiliated with Bally Sports.

In August 2022, Bally Sports announced that Bally Sports+ would expand to the rest of its markets on September 26, 2022. The service was rebranded simply to FanDuel Sports Network upon the October 2024 rebranding.

== See also ==
- FanDuel Sports Network app
