= 2018 Kids' Choice Sports =

- Date: taped July 19, 2018 aired July 20, 2018
- Location: Barker Hangar
- Hosted by: Chris Paul

Television/radio coverage
- Network: Nickelodeon
- Runtime: 90 minutes
- Produced by: Production company: Done and Dusted Nickelodeon Productions; Executive Producers: Jay Schmalholz Shelly Sumpter Gillyard Constance Schwartz Michael Strahan
- Directed by: Hamish Hamilton

The 5th Annual Kids' Choice Sports was held on July 19, 2018, at the Barker Hangar in Santa Monica, California, and was broadcast one day later on July 20 (originally scheduled to be broadcast on July 21, but was moved ahead by one day). Houston Rockets' point guard and former NBA All-Star MVP, Chris Paul hosted the show.

== Sports Council ==
A Kids' Choice Sports Council was formed to "lend their expertise and experience to help inform the awards show, consult on the nominee process and give feedback on categories." Committee members are:

- Baron Davis (former Hornets and two-time NBA All-Star)
- Ken Griffey Jr. (former baseball outfielder and 13-time All-Star)
- Lisa Leslie (former WNBA MVP and four-time Olympic gold medal winner)
- Cal Ripken Jr. (former shortstop and third baseman for the Baltimore Orioles and 19-time All-Star)
- Deion Sanders (NFL Pro Football Hall of Famer)
- Misty May-Treanor (three-time Olympic beach volleyball gold medalist)
- Andy Elkin (Agent, Creative Artists Agency)
- Tracy Perlman (VP Entertainment Marketing and Promotions, NFL)
- Jeff Schwartz (President and Founder, Excel Sports Management)
- Jill Smoller (SVP, William Morris Endeavor)
- Leah Wilcox (VP, Talent Relations, NBA)
- Alan Zucker (SVP, IMG Clients Group)
- Michael Phelps (most decorated Olympian of all time)
- Tony Hawk (professional skateboarder)
- Zane Stoddard (VP, Entertainment Marketing and Content Development, NASCAR)

== Host ==
- Chris Paul

== Nominees ==
Winners are highlighted in bold

=== Best Male Athlete ===
- **LeBron James (NBA, Los Angeles Lakers)**
- Cristiano Ronaldo (La Liga, Juventus, Portugal World Cup and National Football team)
- James Harden (NBA, Houston Rockets)
- Jose Altuve (MLB, Houston Astros)
- Sidney Crosby (NHL, Pittsburgh Penguins)
- Tom Brady (NFL, New England Patriots)

=== Best Female Athlete ===
- **Alex Morgan (NWSL, Orlando Pride, US Women's National Team)**
- Chloe Kim (Professional Snowboarder, US Team)
- Jamie Anderson (Professional Snowboarder, US Team)
- Katie Ledecky (Competitive Swimmer, US Team)
- Mikaela Shiffrin (Skiing, US Ski Team)
- Sloane Stephens (WTA)
- Venus Williams (WTA)

=== Favorite Newcomer ===
- **Allisha Gray (WNBA, Dallas Wings)**
- Aaron Judge (MLB, New York Yankees)
- Ben Simmons (NBA, Philadelphia 76ers)
- Deshaun Watson (NFL, Houston Texans)
- Donovan Mitchell (NBA, Utah Jazz)
- Lonzo Ball (NBA, Los Angeles Lakers)
- Red Gerard (Professional Snowboarder, US Team)

=== Hands of Gold ===
- **Antonio Brown (NFL, Pittsburgh Steelers)**
- Danny Amendola (NFL, Miami Dolphins)
- Julio Jones (NFL, Atlanta Falcons)
- Maddie Rooney (U.S. Women's National Ice Hockey Team)
- Nolan Arenado (MLB, Colorado Rockies)
- Pekka Rinne (NHL, Nashville Predators)

=== Clutch Player of the Year ===
- **Kevin Durant (NBA, Golden State Warriors)**
- Carli Lloyd (NWSL, Sky Blue FC, US Women's National Team)
- Chris Paul (NBA, Houston Rockets)
- Katie Ledecky (Competitive Swimmer, US Team)
- Lionel Messi (La Liga, FC Barcelona, Argentina National Football Team)
- Nick Foles (NFL, Philadelphia Eagles)

=== Sickest Moves ===
- **Russell Westbrook, (NBA, Oklahoma City Thunder)**
- Alex Morgan (NWSL, Orlando Pride, US Women's National Team)
- Alex Ovechkin (NHL, Washington Capitals)
- Giannis Antetokounmpo (NBA, Milwaukee Bucks)
- Le'Veon Bell (NFL, Pittsburgh Steelers)
- Stephen Curry (NBA, Golden State Warriors)
- Zlatan Ibrahimović (MLS, LA Galaxy)

=== Heavy Hitter ===
- **Venus Williams (Tennis, WTA)**
- Aaron Judge (MLB, New York Yankees)
- Alex Ovechkin (NHL, Washington Capitals)
- Bryce Harper (MLB, Washington Nationals)
- Dustin Johnson (Golf)
- Giancarlo Stanton (MLB, New York Yankees)
- Jocelyne Lamoureux-Davidson (U.S. Women's National Ice Hockey Team)

=== Winter Wonders ===
- **Shaun White (Professional Snowboarder, US Team)**
- Adam Rippon (Professional Figure Skater, US Team)
- Alex and Maia Shibutani (Professional Figure Skaters, US Team)
- Chloe Kim (Professional Snowboarder, US Team)
- Jamie Anderson (Professional Snowboarder, US Team)
- Mikaela Shiffrin (Skiing, US Team)
- Red Gerard (Professional Snowboarder, US Team)

=== Most Valuable Most Valuable Player ===
- **James Harden (2018 NBA MVP)**
- Giancarlo Stanton (2017 MLB National League MVP)
- Jose Altuve (2017 MLB American League MVP)
- Sylvia Fowles (2017 WNBA MVP)
- Taylor Hall (2018 NHL MVP)
- Tom Brady (2018 NFL MVP)

=== Don't Try This at Home ===
- **Chloe Kim (Professional Snowboarder, US Team)**
- Colton Walker (BMX)
- Ibtihaj Muhammad (Fencing, US Team)
- Lakey Peterson (World Surf League)
- Mirai Nagasu (Professional Figure Skater, US Team)
- Nyjah Huston (Professional Skateboarder)
- Shaun White (Professional Snowboarder, US Team)

=== King of Swag ===
- **Odell Beckham Jr. (NFL, New York Giants)**
- Adam Rippon (Professional Figure Skater, US Team)
- Chris Paul (NBA, Houston Rockets)
- Neymar Jr. (France Ligue 1, Brazil National Football Team, Paris Saint-Germain)
- P. K. Subban (NHL, Nashville Predators)
- Russell Westbrook (NBA, Oklahoma City Thunder)
- Travis Kelce (NFL, Kansas City Chiefs)

=== Queen of Swag ===
- **Serena Williams (WTA)**
- Brighton Zeuner (Professional Skateboarder)
- Ibtihaj Muhammad (Fencing, US Team)
- Jamie Anderson (Professional Snowboarder)
- Michelle Wie (LPGA)
- Skylar Diggins-Smith (WNBA, Dallas Wings)
- Sydney Leroux (NWSL, Orlando Pride)

=== Best Cannon ===
- **Russell Wilson (NFL, Seattle Seahawks)**
- Aaron Rodgers (NFL, Green Bay Packers)
- Clayton Kershaw (MLB, Los Angeles Dodgers)
- Corey Kluber (MLB, Cleveland Indians)
- Dak Prescott (NFL, Dallas Cowboys)
- Justin Verlander (MLB, Houston Astros)

=== Biggest Powerhouse ===
- **Rob Gronkowski (NFL, New England Patriots)**
- Anthony Davis (NBA, New Orleans Pelicans)
- Draymond Green (NBA, Golden State Warriors)
- Giannis Antetokounmpo (NBA, Milwaukee Bucks)
- Joel Embiid (NBA, Philadelphia 76ers)
- Rose Namajunas (MMA)
- Von Miller (NFL, Denver Broncos)

=== Need for Speed ===
- **Lindsey Vonn (Skiing, US Team)**
- Chris Mazdzer (Luge, US Team)
- Jimmie Johnson (NASCAR)
- John-Henry Krueger (Speed Skating, US Team)
- Kyle Busch (NASCAR)
- Mikaela Shiffrin (Skiing, US Team)

=== Nothing But Net ===
- **Chris Paul (NBA, Houston Rockets)**
- Alex Morgan (NWSL, Orlando Pride, US Women's National Team)
- James Harden (NBA, Houston Rockets)
- J.J. Redick (NBA Philadelphia 76ers)
- Klay Thompson (NBA, Golden State Warriors)
- Kyle Korver (NBA, Cleveland Cavaliers)
- Patrick Kane (NHL, Chicago Blackhawks)
- Patrik Laine (NHL, Winnipeg Jets)

=== Biggest Kid ===
- **Laurie Hernandez (Gymnastics)**
- Andre Drummond (NBA, Detroit Pistons)
- DeAndre Jordan (NBA, Dallas Mavericks)
- Julian Edelman (NFL, New England Patriots)
- Kyrie Irving (NBA, Boston Celtics)
- Maia Shibutani (Figure Skating)
- Rob Gronkowski (NFL, New England Patriots)
- Yasiel Puig (MLB, Los Angeles Dodgers)

=== Play of the Year ===
- **LeBron James Alley Oop to Himself (NBA, Cleveland Cavaliers)**
- Aaron Judge Hits 50th Homerun (MLB, New York Yankees)
- Devante Smith-Pelly's Stanley Cup Finals goal (NHL, Washington Capitals)
- George Springer World Series Homerun (MLB, Houston Astros)
- Jocelyne Lamoureux-Davidson's Shootout Goal (U.S. Women's National Ice Hockey Team)
- Kevin Durant's 'Déjà Vu' Dagger Shot (NBA, Golden State Warriors)
- Nick Foles Super Bowl "Philly Special" (NFL, Philadelphia Eagles)
- Stefon Diggs Game-Winning "Minneapolis Miracle Catch" (NFL, Minnesota Vikings)

== Stunts and Events ==
Michael Strahan hosted a dance off between Mikaela Shiffrin, P.K. Subban, P.J Tucker and Ibtihaj Muhammad.

Two children were tasked with making free-throws with basketballs. Adjacent to each hoop was a massive dunk tank filled with green slime, with basketball stars Candace Parker and Isaiah Thomas positioned above the tanks. Whichever child hit the most shots would cause the star adjacent to their basket to fall into the slime. This resulted in Parker being dunked, submerged, and totally covered in the slime.

JoJo Siwa hosted a throwing accuracy challenge between, Alex Shibutani, Maia Shibutani, Shaun White and Chloe Kim that would result in a Knight Squad cast member being dunked into the slime tanks.

Marc Summers and Liza Koshy held a game of Double Dare between host Chris Paul and Michael Phelps.

== Legend Award ==
NASCAR racer Danica Patrick was the Legend Award winner. She was the first woman to receive the award. Patrick was then completely and overwhelmingly covered with thick gold slime that shot out from hidden jets on the ground next to her. This was a tradition that has accompanied all prior winners.
