= Formula 1: Drive to Survive season 5 =

2023 documentary television series

Formula 1: Drive to Survive
- Season 5
- No. of episodes: 10

Release
- Original network: Netflix
- Original release: 24 February 2023

Season chronology
- ← Previous; Season 4 Next → Season 6

The fifth season of Formula 1: Drive to Survive documents the 2022 Formula One World Championship. It ran for 10 episodes and aired on Netflix on 24 February 2023, all of which were available on the same date.

== Premise and release ==
Season 5 documents the 2022 Formula One World Championship and was released on 24 February 2023 with all 10 episodes released on the same date. This season covers the trials and tribulations of the Scuderia Ferrari, the porpoising issue of the Mercedes W13, the path leading up to Sergio Pérez' win at the Monaco Grand Prix, the controversy surrounding Oscar Piastri's contract dispute, and Daniel Ricciardo's struggles at McLaren. Red Bull Racing driver Max Verstappen confirmed that Season 5 marks his first full appearance within in-show interviews, having criticized it in the past for fabricating events that happened during the World Championships.

== Episodes ==
No. overall	No. in season	Title	Original release date
41	1	"The New Dawn"	24 February 2023
The episode begins with a recap of the closing laps of the 2021 Abu Dhabi Grand Prix controversy. After showing how important the relationship is between Guenther Steiner and Mattia Binotto for their respective teams, the 2022 Formula 1 season opens with pre-season testing at the Circuit de Barcelona-Catalunya. The teams and drivers all prepare their cars for the upcoming races. This year also marks the largest changes to the cars in many years. Controversy arises when Haas F1 Team drops its major sponsor Uralkali along with its sponsored driver Nikita Mazepin due to the Russian invasion of Ukraine. Haas brings back Kevin Magnussen after he was let go from the team back in 2020. Current World Champion Max Verstappen finally makes an appearance on the show after having declined to appear in previous seasons. In the early races many teams, especially the Mercedes-AMG Petronas F1 Team, have to deal with issues of porpoising, a potential problem related to Ground Effect, which returned after having been banned in 1982. The first race, the 2022 Bahrain Grand Prix, is shown with both of the Red Bull cars losing power, Scuderia Ferrari achieving their first win in 910 days with their drivers Charles Leclerc and Carlos Sainz Jr. taking first and second place respectively and Kevin Magnussen achieving fifth place on his first outing back at Haas.
42	2	"Bounce Back"	24 February 2023
Mercedes' W13 Is put to the test at pre-season tests at Bahrain with Lewis Hamilton and new teammate George Russell behind the wheel. However, the car exhibits an incredibly unpleasant drive with an excessive amount of porpoising. The team has noticed the issue and plans to work on it before further tests commence. However, for Mercedes, the issue seems to remain unfixed. Indeed, the issues are present coming to the races at Imola, Spain, and Monaco, before arriving at the Baku City Circuit for Azerbaijan. Lewis' back starts to exhibit pain as he goes down the straights of Baku as Max Verstappen takes home the victory with Lewis taking fourth. After the race, the team principals convene for a meeting, where Toto Wolff of Mercedes expresses his dismay and concern about the safety of the drivers. The Silverstone round, which also coincided with Zhou Guanyu's big crash coming into Abbey, finishes with Lewis taking third place and Carlos Sainz Jr. taking his first career victory in Formula One. Lewis, having questioned the possibilities of retirement following the 2021 season, announces he is here to stay with Mercedes.
43	3	"Matter of Principal"	24 February 2023
The first outing of the Miami Grand Prix is starting, and Ferrari looks to continue their successful streak starting from Bahrain and Australia into Miami. Ferrari's two drivers Charles Leclerc - who is leading the Drivers' Championship coming into the race - and Carlos Sainz Jr. lock out the first two rows of the grid. In the race, Verstappen immediately takes second from Sainz, and would take the lead by the ninth lap. Soon, McLaren's Lando Norris makes contact with Pierre Gasly of AlphaTauri, bringing out the safety car. Leclerc's old tires soon give him a disadvantage, which Verstappen exploits in his first victory in Miami. Leclerc finishes second ahead of his teammate. As the season continues, Ferrari continues to make errors that end up costing their drivers the win; in Monaco, Leclerc leads the race as Sainz is brought in, but Leclerc, having been told to come in too, follows Sainz into the pits - only being told to stay out after he had already came in for his stop - handing Red Bull's Sergio Pérez the victory as Leclerc finishes fourth; in Baku, both Ferraris - Leclerc leading - retire due to mechanical failure with Verstappen winning; and in Canada, both Ferraris stay out again and are inconvenienced by their old rubber, handing Verstappen the win once again. At a rainy Silverstone qualification, Sainz scores his first pole position in his career, and Leclerc, having spun earlier in quali, takes third. The race starts with a big crash for Zhou Guanyu, red-flagging the race. The race starts with Sainz, having retained his grid position, getting a good start; by lap ten, Sainz continues to control the field, but makes an error, allowing Verstappen to take the lead. However, the Red Bull driver reports a puncture and pits, allowing Sainz to take the lead again with Leclerc behind. Soon, the Ferrari pit wall tells Sainz to give the position to Leclerc as Esteban Ocon retires due to mechanical issues, bringing out a safety car. As Leclerc is told to stay out on his old tires, Sainz is brought in for fresh rubber. The race restarts and Sainz overtakes his struggling teammate for first, going on to win his first race in his career. Mattia Binotto, acknowledging the strategical errors made throughout the season thus far, resolves to fix them in the following races.
44	4	"Like Father, Like Son?"	24 February 2023
In his second year in the team, Haas driver Mick Schumacher faces a lot of pressure, which is not helped by a lot of expectations from being a Formula Two World Champion and being the son of a seven-time World Champion. The paddock travels to the Jeddah Corniche Circuit for the second running of the Saudi Arabian Grand Prix; as qualification for the race begins, Mick's run grinds to a halt when he suffers a big crash, ruling him out of the race due to the damage sustained to his car. Schumacher continues to struggle after Saudi; in Miami, Schumacher, in ninth place, collides with Sebastian Vettel, taking both drivers out of the race; he starts his Monaco run at the back of the field, only to lose it coming into the swimming pool section and splitting his car in half in the ensuing crash. By the time the paddock has traveled to Baku, Magnussen has led the championship for the Haas team with 15 points against Schumacher's 0, and faces a lot of pressure over his future in the team. Schumacher starts the race in last place, while Magnussen rises up the field. However, Magnussen's race is stopped due to an engine issue, leaving Haas' chance for points in the hands of a slow-running Schumacher. Indeed, Schumacher is running very slowly to the point he is lapped by the leading Verstappen. Away from the track, Schumacher trains with his personal trainer, convinced he can still score points. At Silverstone, Schumacher starts at the back of the grid, but the session is red-flagged due to a big crash for Zhou Guanyu, which the Haas drivers manage to avoid. Schumacher and Magnussen are due to start 16th and 14th, respectively. Schumacher pushes through the field - and with an overtake on Ricciardo, a DRS-assisted overtake on Vettel - and ultimately Verstappen, he ultimately manages to finish eighth - his first points in Formula One, sending the Haas pit wall into a celebration; Vettel and Verstappen also congratulate Schumacher for his efforts during the race. However, despite his efforts in the race, Mick's seat in the Haas team remains open.
45	5	"Pardon My French"	24 February 2023
Under the management of new team principal Otmar Szafnauer, Alpine F1 Team goes into 2022 retaining their drivers Fernando Alonso, a veteran of Team Enstone and two-time Champion, and Esteban Ocon, the driver who took Alpine to their first victory since 2014, with a new reserve driver in Australian driver and 2021 Formula Two champion Oscar Piastri. Alpine scores consistent points scores in Miami, Baku, and Austria. By the French round - the home race of Alpine - McLaren and Alpine are tied for fourth in the Constructors' Championship. Early into the race, Alonso edges past Norris for fourth, with Ocon behind him. However, Ocon inadvertently takes Yuki Tsunoda out of the race, giving him a five-second penalty. Pitting soon after drops him down out of the points, with Alonso now sixth and a second behind Norris. Alonso holds the McLarens up to buy enough time for Ocon to pass them. Alonso finishes sixth and Ocon eighth in their home race. Before Hungary, it is revealed that four-time Champion Sebastian Vettel will retire from Formula One, sending the paddock and media into a frenzy with the prospect of a "silly season" on the horizon; Szafnauer is adamant that Alonso is staying with Alpine for 2023. Hungary is the make-or-break round for Alpine - both drivers need to score higher points than McLaren to achieve fourth in the Constructors' Championship. Ricciardo and Lance Stroll both overtake the Alpines, but Ricciardo punts Stroll off the track, giving him a five-second penalty. Alonso and Ocon barely hold on to the points, and Ricciardo finishes fifteenth after his penalty, allowing Alpine to secure fourth place. The team and their title sponsors BWT celebrate at a sponsor dinner. The next day, Alonso reveals he had received a call from Aston Martin team owner Lawrence Stroll to replace the outgoing Vettel, moving him out of Team Enstone. Left with no other option, Alpine announce Piastri for the 2023 season, and McLaren are looking to replace Ricciardo with Piastri, who they have had eyes on. To make matters worse for Alpine, Piastri announces on Twitter that he will not be driving for the team, considering he had not signed such a contract with them.
46	6	"Nice Guys Finish Last"	24 February 2023
As the season goes into the summer break, the effects of Oscar Piastri's refusal of his Alpine seat are still felt - and right in the line of fire is McLaren's Daniel Ricciardo, who had been struggling throughout the season. Indeed, McLaren has announced Ricciardo's retirement from the team after the season, with Piastri taking his spot. Meanwhile, Alpine are still reeling from the losses of Piastri and Alonso, but the Piastri fiasco has backed both Alpine and McLaren into a wall, with Alpine potentially taking Piastri to court and McLaren CEO Zak Brown potentially having to pay Piastri and Alpine - and given Ricciardo's near-consistent results back at Team Enstone back in the 2019 season, it remains unknown if he would return considering his decision to move to McLaren in 2021. The Dutch round is the first ever since the announcement, and Ricciardo and Gasly, both winners of past races, are looking to perform their best. Gasly fights with Alonso in the midfield as Ricciardo, having received fresher rubber, pushes on Vettel while Alonso manages to take Gasly up. Ricciardo continues to drop down the field as both Haas drivers pass him. Gasly finishes eleventh with Ricciardo in seventeenth. By the Japan round, Alpine announces will have a new driver in Pierre Gasly for the 2023 season.
47	7	"Hot Seat"	24 February 2023
Red Bull team principal Christian Horner assesses Sergio Pérez's contributions to the team: having helped teammate Verstappen win the championship in 2021, Pérez's signing proved fruitful. However, Horner says that Pérez must deliver once more as the season goes underway. As the Monaco Grand Prix weekend approaches, Red Bull has taken the lead of both Championships from Ferrari. Pérez has had hardships in earlier races, failing to capitalise on having a championship-contending car, and pressure on him begins to mount; in the past, the second Red Bull seat was occupied by Pierre Gasly and Alex Albon, both of whom have underperformed in such a position before. During qualifying, home hero Leclerc takes pole position, with Pérez in third behind the other Ferrari of Sainz. However, Pérez spins going into Portier corner during another run, breaking his rear wing; Sainz soon follows after. With the track blocked, the resulting red flag disallows Verstappen another run. The race would be held under wet conditions, delaying the start. The start would instead be held behind the safety car, and the Ferraris begin to assert their dominance. As the rain dries up, Ferrari ends up making a crucial strategical mistake, pitting Leclerc just after Sainz, that hands Pérez the race lead. However, Schumacher crashes at the swimming pool, red-flagging the race. After the safety car restart, Pérez keeps his lead ahead of an attacking Sainz and teammate Verstappen to win the race, extending Red Bull's lead over Ferrari in the Constructors' Championship. Soon after his victory, Pérez extends his contract with Red Bull, seeing him race with them for the foreseeable future.
48	8	"Alpha Male"	24 February 2023
As Pierre Gasly departs Scuderia AlphaTauri for the grace of Alpine, Yuki Tsunoda faces the pressure of losing a teammate and a friend.
49	9	"Over The Limit"	24 February 2023
While Verstappen wraps up his second title and the Constructors' Championship for Red Bull Racing, its management faces hot water as they are accused of breaching the cost cap during the 2021 season.
50	10	"End of the Road"	24 February 2023
At the Abu Dhabi Grand Prix, Scuderia Ferrari fights Mercedes, and McLaren give it their all to overtake Alpine.
