= Formula 1: Drive to Survive season 7 =

2025 documentary television series

Formula 1: Drive to Survive
- Season 7
- No. of episodes: 10

Release
- Original network: Netflix
- Original release: 7 March 2025

Season chronology
- ← Previous; Season 6 Next → Season 8

The seventh season of Formula 1: Drive to Survive documents the 2024 Formula One World Championship. The season contains 10 episodes, which were all released on Netflix on 7 March 2025.

== Premise and release ==
The season was released on 7 March 2025 with all 10 episodes released on the same date. The season covers the 2024 season, including Lewis Hamilton's shock move to Scuderia Ferrari, scandals revolving around Christian Horner, Lando Norris' bid for the championship, and Daniel Ricciardo's bow out of Formula One.

== Episodes ==
No. overall	No. in season	Title	Original release date
61	1	"Business as Usual"	7 March 2025
Lewis Hamilton announces his move to Ferrari, while allegations against Christian Horner spread around the paddock.
62	2	"Frenemies"	7 March 2025
Lando Norris makes a bid for the championship against Max Verstappen.
63	3	"Looking Out for Number 1"	7 March 2025
George Russell steps into the lead driver role at Mercedes in light of Hamilton's impending departure.
64	4	"Carlos Signs"	7 March 2025
With Hamilton set to move to Ferrari, Carlos Sainz Jr. is left seatless.
65	5	"Le Curse of Leclerc"	7 March 2025
Charles Leclerc vies to win the Monaco Grand Prix for the first time in his career.
66	6	"Wheels of Fortune"	7 March 2025
McLaren has a good car and good drivers to fight for the Championship, but their strategy may be their undoing.
67	7	"In The Heat of the Night"	7 March 2025
A look at the Singapore Grand Prix from the perspective of five Formula One drivers.
68	8	"Elbows Out"	7 March 2025
Pressure is put on Sergio Pérez to perform for Red Bull, but he ends up making costly mistakes, forcing the team to scout out potential replacements.
69	9	"Under New Management"	7 March 2025
Haas and Alpine undergo changes in leadership as they battle for sixth place.
70	10	"End Game"	7 March 2025
As the season draws to a close, the Constructors' Championship is in for the taking, and McLaren has to contend against esteemed competitors Red Bull and Ferrari.
