= Formula 1: Drive to Survive season 6 =

2024 documentary television series

Formula 1: Drive to Survive
- Season 6
- No. of episodes: 10

Release
- Original network: Netflix
- Original release: 23 February 2024

Season chronology
- ← Previous; Season 5 Next → Season 7

The sixth season of Formula 1: Drive to Survive documents the 2023 Formula One World Championship through ten episodes, which were all released on Netflix on 23 February 2024.

== Premise and release ==
This season of Drive to Survive focuses on the 2023 season and related stories, including Nyck de Vries' brief Formula One career, the trials and tribulations, both managerial and performance-related, of the Alpine F1 Team, the fight between Haas and Williams to get out of last place in the Constructors' Championship, and Lewis Hamilton's future in not only the sport, but within his team, following a winless drought with a floundering Mercedes team. Ironically, while episode 6 ends with him in 2023 signing a two-year deal with Mercedes, Hamilton had already been confirmed to move to Scuderia Ferrari for the 2025 season earlier in February 2024. This season marks the debut of former NASCAR driver Danica Patrick as a pundit for the show.

The trailer for the sixth season was released on 12 February 2024 with all 10 episodes released on the same date. The season was launched on 23 February 2024.

== Episodes ==
No. overall	No. in season	Title	Original release date
51	1	"Money Talks"	23 February 2024
Aston Martin team owner Lawrence Stroll rolls out its 2023 challenger, driven by his son Lance Stroll and new acquisition, two-time Champion Fernando Alonso. However, Stroll suffers a biking incident during pre-season testing, but recovers sufficiently to enter the Bahrain Grand Prix. Stroll, wanting to make his father happy, qualifies in eighth, but during the race itself, he makes contact with Alonso. Successfully overcoming his pain, Stroll would finish in sixth after taking advantage of Mercedes' inferior pace and tyre degradation and the retirement of Charles Leclerc.
52	2	"Fall from Grace"	23 February 2024
Nyck de Vries, having finished in ninth during the 2022 Italian Grand Prix, makes his debut for Scuderia AlphaTauri, but soon the cracks start to show as he consistently drops below the pace. De Vries is expected to lead the team given his experience, but third year driver Yuki Tsunoda consistently outperforms him. De Vries' underperformance would lead to him getting replaced by Red Bull reserve driver Daniel Ricciardo, who had just completed a wet-weather test at Silverstone Circuit.
53	3	"Under Pressure"	23 February 2024
After the trials and tribulations of their previous season, McLaren roll out the McLaren MCL60. However, its lack of performance disappoints Lando Norris, who considers future paths. Zak Brown worries about keeping Norris and important sponsors with the team. The first part of the season remains highly disappointing, but the tables turn when Norris, harnessing a much-improved MCL60, returns McLaren to the podium at their home race when he finishes in second at the British Grand Prix, with Piastri in fourth.
54	4	"The Last Chapter"	23 February 2024
Haas and Williams have been backmarkers for the longest time, but one team will make a bold move in an attempt to catapult themselves up the field. To gain an edge over Haas, Williams takes a gamble with new team principal James Vowles. However, they keep ending up out of the points, and Vowles grows worried about the state of the team. Meanwhile, Haas scores a good result at the Australian Grand Prix, which sees the team rise to 7th place in the constructors championship with Williams still in last. However, during the Canadian Grand Prix, Alexander Albon manages to score six points, giving Williams crucial championship points. After a design change, Williams, now harbouring a data-driven mindset and a more competitive car, rise to ninth place in the constructors championship while Haas continues to underperform as the season progresses, including a streak of five pointless races for the team. Coming to the end of the season, Haas has made an upgrade to the car in hopes of keeping up in the battle with Williams, but Kevin Magnussen crashes heavily at the Mexico City Grand Prix.
55	5	"Civil War"	23 February 2024
Pierre Gasly, a former AlphaTauri driver, joins the Alpine F1 Team, which gives Alpine an all-French lineup in a French team. For Gasly, moving to Alpine is a big step up. However, Gasly’s rivalry with existing driver Esteban Ocon, stemming from a last-lap pass in their karting days, threatens to tear the team apart. Ocon is known for not always being a team player, which became visible in previous years, during Ocon’s time with Mexican driver Sergio Pérez in the former Force India team. The first seedlings for the interteam tension are planted during the Australian Grand Prix, which sees the two fight very close to each other. This culminates in a late-stage red flag, and subsequently a chaotic restart and heavy crash between the two French drivers. After a good qualifying session for both drivers during the Monaco Grand Prix, Ocon achieves the team's first podium within shifting conditions by finishing third despite a brief tangle with Carlos Sainz Jr.
56	6	"Leap of Faith"	23 February 2024
With his contract impending a renewal, and no wins to his name in both the 2022 and 2023 seasons, Lewis Hamilton must make a tough decision: stay with the Mercedes team he has been driving for the past thirteen seasons, or move to another team. Hamilton finds it frustrating to see other drivers like Fernando Alonso score podiums with a different team, while his Mercedes car is not the best on the grid. Hamilton has been loyal to the team for 13 years, but winning and good results come first. Hamilton admits he told the team that things needed to change, but the team did not listen to him. Team principal Toto Wolff looks back on the seasons he had with Hamilton, who outs his hunger to win, especially since he has not won a race since the 2021 Saudi Arabian Grand Prix. After an upgrade to the car, Mercedes tries to rise in the Constructors' Championship during the Spanish Grand Prix. It pays off with a double podium finish for the team - second for Hamilton, and third for teammate George Russell. Hamilton and Wolff talk about their future together - Hamilton knows he doesn’t have an infinite amount of years left in the sport, but Wolff wants him to remain a vital part of the team, eventually leading to Hamilton signing a new two-year contract with Mercedes until the end of 2025.
57	7	"C’est la Vie"	23 February 2024
The Alpine outfit obtains an investment from a group of celebrity investors which include actor Ryan Reynolds, but their drivers are dissatisfied as they are still unable to obtain the pace to save their skins. At the British Grand Prix, the team suffers a double retirement; Ocon due to reliability and Gasly due to contact with Stroll. The Hungarian Grand Prix does not prove any better after Zhou Guanyu sends Daniel Ricciardo right into the Alpines, sending them into each other; however, Gasly would achieve the team's second podium at the Dutch Grand Prix, the first under new team principal Bruno Famin - with both cars in the points - which was assisted by a good strategy gamble, using the shifting conditions to their advantage. This points gain is immensely needed right after managerial turmoil from Alpine's side during the Belgian Grand Prix, including the departures of team principal Otmar Szafnauer and Alpine CEO Laurent Rossi.
58	8	"Forza Ferrari"	23 February 2024
After a 2022 season that saw an early advantage slip away due to reliability issues and errors from both drivers and Ferrari's strategy team, team principal Mattia Binotto departs the Scuderia. Binotto's replacement, Frédéric Vasseur, is not Italian, nor the type of person that is usually chosen to be team principal for Ferrari. It’s a big step up for him after six seasons as Alfa Romeo team principal. Ferrari has had a bad start to the season, but the team wants to turn things around at the Italian Grand Prix, their home race. At this moment, Ferrari find themselves in fourth place in the constructors championship. If they win the Italian Grand Prix, it could be their first Monza victory since their famous victory in 2019; Red Bull Racing has won every single race of the season up until this point. Things start looking good when Carlos Sainz Jr. scores a pole position, with Charles Leclerc settling for third. After a spirited defence from the Ferrari driver, Sainz loses the lead to Max Verstappen, who ends up winning the race while Sergio Pérez takes second place. Sainz and Leclerc settle for third and fourth. In Singapore, Sainz takes pole position while both Red Bull drivers experience difficulties with their car, starting eleventh and thirteenth. Both Ferraris take the lead in the first corner. Verstappen tries to catch up to the Ferraris but only manages to make it to fifth place. By the end of the race, Sainz and Leclerc are racing against George Russell in the front. Sainz manages to keep Russell behind, who ends up in the barriers on the last lap, and keeps Lando Norris behind him using DRS. Sainz wins the race while Leclerc takes fourth.
59	9	"Three's a Crowd"	23 February 2024
Following the removal of De Vries from his AlphaTauri seat, Daniel Ricciardo is drafted back in, but he suffers an incident during practice of the Dutch Grand Prix that allows Red Bull reserve Liam Lawson to hop into the vacant seat.
60	10	"Red or Black"	23 February 2024
With Red Bull Racing's Max Verstappen winning both titles in dominant styles, the battle for second place in the constructors' championship boils down to Mercedes and Ferrari.
