= Formula 1: Drive to Survive season 8 =

2026 documentary television series

Formula 1: Drive to Survive
- Season 8
- No. of episodes: 8

Release
- Original network: Netflix (worldwide); Apple TV (United States)
- Original release: 27 February 2026

Season chronology
- ← Previous; Season 7

The eighth season of Formula 1: Drive to Survive documents the 2025 Formula One World Championship. The season contains 8 episodes, which was released on Netflix worldwide and on Apple TV in the United States on 27 February 2026.

== Premise and release ==
In March 2025, Netflix officially announced the renewal of the series for an eighth season with all 8 episodes released on the same date. It was released on 27 February 2026.

On 26 February 2026, it was announced that Netflix and Apple TV (the latter having taken over the broadcast rights for Formula One in the United States that year) had reached a deal where Netflix would non-exclusively license out the series to Apple TV in the United States starting with the eighth season, with Netflix also broadcasting the Canadian Grand Prix alongside Apple TV in exchange.

== Episodes ==
No. overall	No. in season	Title	Original release date
71	1	"New Kids On The Track"	27 February 2026
The F1 75 Live event is held at the O2 Arena in London, where the ten teams reveal their cars and drivers - including six new rookies and the highly-publicised move of Lewis Hamilton to the perennial Scuderia Ferrari team.
72	2	"Strictly Business"	27 February 2026
At the back, Jack Doohan feels the pressure of Flavio Briatore at Alpine F1 Team, while Jonathan Wheatley of Kick Sauber fields Gabriel Bortoleto, the reigning Formula 2 championship victor.
73	3	"The Number 1 Problem"	27 February 2026
As the season rages on, a title battle between McLaren teammates Lando Norris and Oscar Piastri begins to spark.
74	4	"A Bull With No Horns"	27 February 2026
Championship-winning Red Bull Racing suffers highly-publicised issues: Liam Lawson is dropped down to Racing Bulls in favour of Yuki Tsunoda, while Christian Horner is thrust into the spotlight for all the wrong reasons.
75	5	"The Sky's The Limit"	27 February 2026
Williams Racing has obtained Carlos Sainz Jr. from Ferrari, but the Spaniard struggles against team veteran Alex Albon.
76	6	"The Duel"	27 February 2026
Mercedes fights Ferrari for second in the Constructors' Championship: Hamilton struggles with a poor car, while his replacement Kimi Antonelli weathers through the storm of being paired with George Russell.
77	7	"What Happens In Vegas"	27 February 2026
As the championship fight rages on, the teams reach the Las Vegas Grand Prix.
78	8	"Call Me Chucky"	27 February 2026
McLaren reel from their double disqualification at Vegas, which allowed Verstappen to level in points with Piastri. Norris has an opportunity to win his first Drivers' Championship at the Qatar Grand Prix. An opportune safety car after Hülkenberg crashes allows everyone to pit, though McLaren decide not to. As a result, Verstappen controls the race ahead of Piastri and Carlos Sainz Jr., with Norris in fourth after Antonelli loses his rear, bringing the championship fight to Abu Dhabi. Verstappen is now ahead of Piastri in the Drivers' Championship. At the Abu Dhabi Grand Prix, Verstappen takes pole position ahead of Norris and Piastri. Norris needs a podium finish to secure the Drivers' Championship, and Piastri needs to win with both drivers out of the podium to secure it. Norris falls to third in the race start, but holds on to it for long enough to secure his first Championship.
