= Danica Patrick =

American racing driver (born 1982)

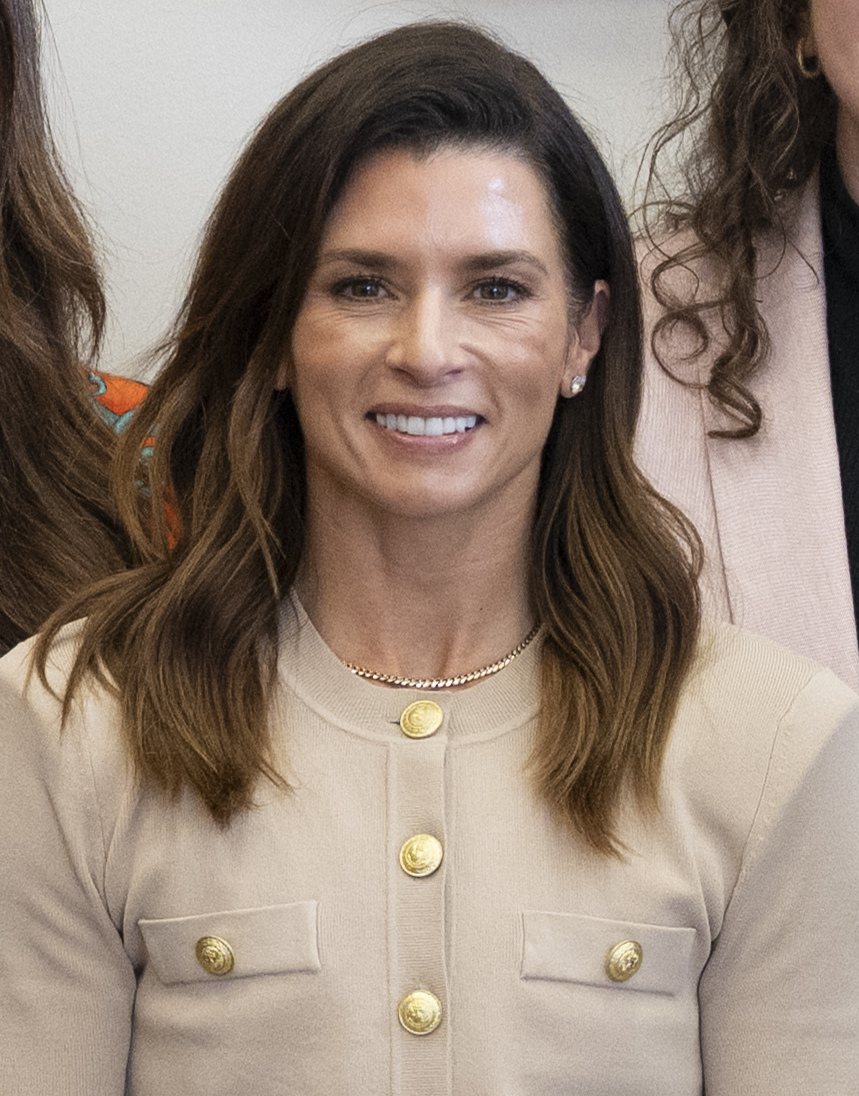
- Patrick in 2025
- Born: Danica Sue Patrick; March 25, 1982 (age 44); Beloit, Wisconsin, U.S.
- Achievements: Multiple firsts for women in American auto racing, including: First to win an IndyCar Series race; First pole position in NASCAR Cup Series; Most starts, laps led, and top-tens for a women in the NASCAR Cup Series.; Highest finish by a woman in Indianapolis 500 and Daytona 500; One of only 14 drivers to have led both races.
- Awards: 2005 Indianapolis 500 Rookie of the Year; 2005 IndyCar Series season Rookie of the Year; IndyCar Series Most Popular Driver 2005–2010; 2012 NASCAR Nationwide Series Most Popular Driver

NASCAR Cup Series career
- 191 races run over 7 years
- 2018 position: 47th
- Best finish: 24th (2015, 2016)
- First race: 2012 Daytona 500 (Daytona)
- Last race: 2018 Daytona 500 (Daytona)
Wins	Top tens	Poles
0	7	1

NASCAR O'Reilly Auto Parts Series career
- 61 races run over 5 years
- 2014 position: 108th
- Best finish: 10th (2012)
- First race: 2010 DRIVE4COPD 300 (Daytona)
- Last race: 2014 DRIVE4COPD 300 (Daytona)
Wins	Top tens	Poles
0	7	1

IndyCar Series career
- 116 races run over 8 years
- Best finish: 5th (2009)
- First race: 2005 Toyota Indy 300 (Homestead)
- Last race: 2018 Indianapolis 500 (Indianapolis)
- First win: 2008 Indy Japan 300 (Motegi)
Wins	Podiums	Poles
1	7	3

Danica Sue Patrick (born March 25, 1982) is an American former professional racing driver who competed in the IndyCar Series from 2005 to 2011 and the NASCAR Cup Series from 2012 to 2018. She is the most successful woman in the history of American open-wheel car racing—her victory in the 2008 Indy Japan 300 is the only win by a woman in IndyCar.

Born to a working-class family in Beloit, Wisconsin, Patrick began karting at the age of ten. She achieved early success by winning her class in the World Karting Association Grand National Championship three times in the mid-1990s. She dropped out of high school with her parents' permission in 1998, and moved to the United Kingdom to further her career. Patrick competed in Formula Vauxhall and Formula Ford before returning to the United States in 2001 due to a lack of funding. In 2002, she competed in five Barber Dodge Pro Series races for Rahal Letterman Racing. Patrick raced in the Toyota Atlantic Series for the next two years. Her best effort was third in the championship standings for the 2004 season where she became the first woman to win a pole position in the series.

Patrick first drove in the IndyCar Series with Rahal Letterman Racing in 2005 and took three pole positions, equaling Tomas Scheckter's record of poles in a rookie season. She was named the Rookie of the Year for both the 2005 Indianapolis 500 and the 2005 IndyCar Series. She improved over the next two years with Rahal Letterman Racing in 2006 and later Andretti Green Racing in 2007. In 2008, Patrick followed up her Japan victory to place sixth overall in the drivers' standings. She placed fifth the following season, which saw her finish a career-high third at the Indianapolis 500, the best performance by any woman at the race. Patrick's overall form declined during 2010, but she still managed two second places at oval tracks before leaving IndyCar after the 2011 season to focus on stock car racing full-time.

Patrick began racing stock cars in 2010 in the NASCAR Nationwide Series (now NASCAR O'Reilly Auto Parts Series) with her best result being a fourth-place finish at Las Vegas Motor Speedway in 2011. She placed a career-high tenth in the 2012 season standings and was the second woman to clinch a pole position in the Nationwide Series after Shawna Robinson in 1994. Patrick started in the Sprint Cup Series (now NASCAR Cup Series) in 2012. She became the first woman to win a Cup Series pole position by setting the fastest qualifying lap for the 2013 Daytona 500, finishing eighth. Patrick bested Janet Guthrie's record for the most top-ten finishes by a woman in the Sprint Cup Series in 2015. She stopped racing full-time after the 2017 season, but competed at the 2018 Daytona 500 and the 2018 Indianapolis 500 before officially retiring.

== Early life ==
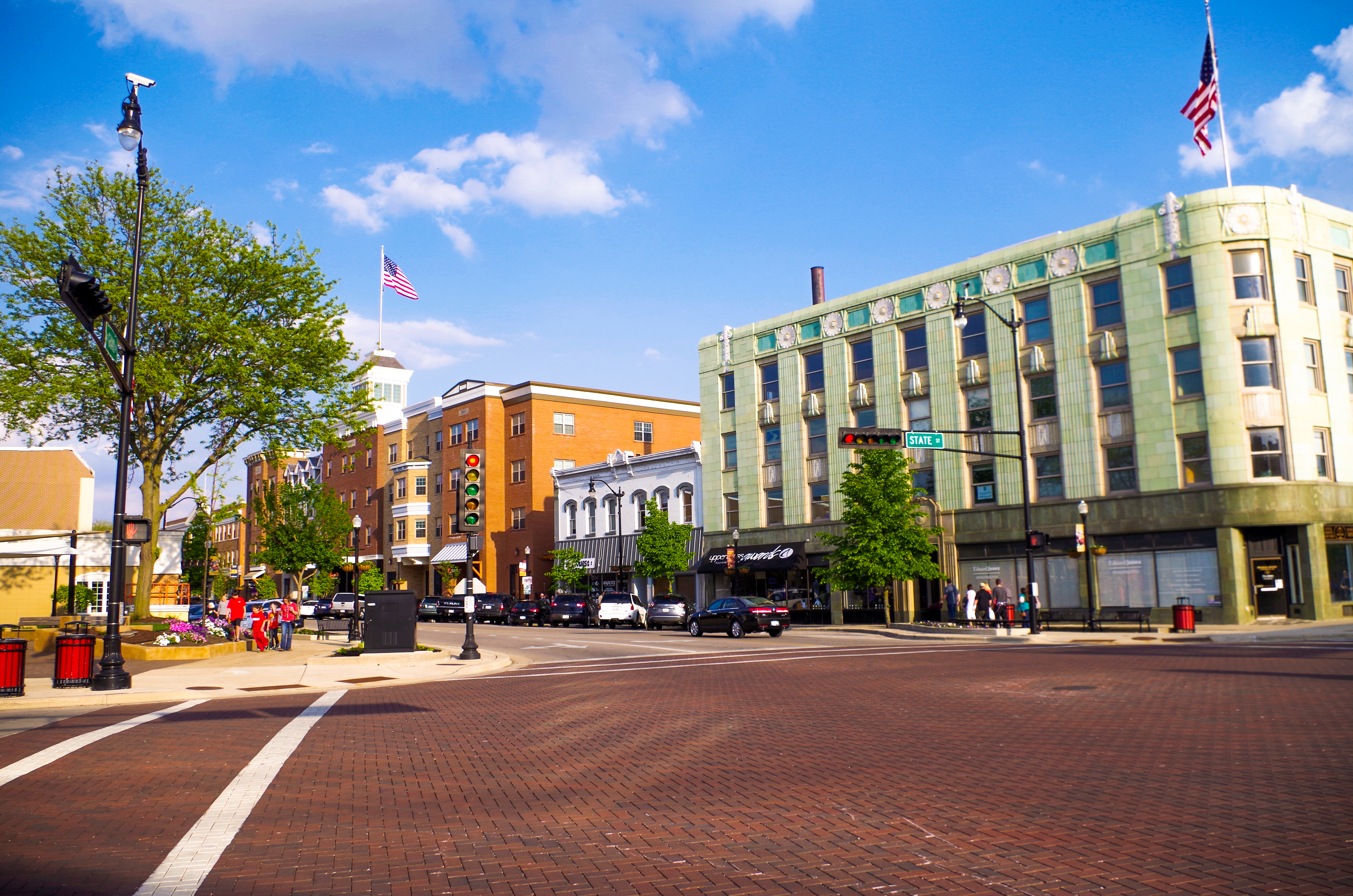
Beloit, Wisconsin, where Patrick was born in 1982

Patrick was born on March 25, 1982, in Beloit, Wisconsin. She is the daughter of working-class parents Beverly Ann (née Flaten) and Terry Joseph "T. J." Patrick Jr. Over the years, the couple has owned a coffee shop and a glass company. Patrick has a younger sister. She is half Norwegian, as well as part Irish, French-Canadian, Italian, and Native American. Patrick was raised in Roscoe, Illinois.

Patrick was a cheerleader at Hononegah Community High School in nearby Rockton in 1996. She spent her off-time babysitting for a nearby family when she was not racing. Initially she had no interest in racing, and thought of a career as a secretary, a singer, or a veterinarian. The sisters told their parents of their wish to race go-karts after a friend of Brooke's allowed her to drive one. They were each given a go-kart.

Patrick began karting at Sugar River Raceway in Brodhead, Wisconsin. (Note: Brooke later became dissatisfied with go-karting after crashing several times and stopped.) Her father acted as her crew chief and her mother kept statistics on her racing. Patrick had no role models or idols; she was never "striving to achieve female goals", but aspired to "be the best [she] could be." Patrick's first time driving a go-kart ended when, running practice laps, she crashed into a concrete wall at 25 mph (40 km/h) due to a brake failure. She was not injured. Patrick finished second out of twenty drivers at the year's end after a twenty-two race schedule. She gradually improved her eye to foot coordination, allowing her to set numerous age-specific track records at Sugar River Raceway and Michiana Raceway Park. Along with her interest in kart racing, Patrick dabbled in snowmobiles, motocross, and midget car racing.

At age 13, Patrick asked her parents about moving to California so she could compete throughout the year; they declined, citing business commitments. Nevertheless, she ventured across much of the Midwestern United States, and the rest of the country, to enable her to race. To help defray travel expenses, the family sold merchandise featuring Patrick and imposed a rule that prevented her from undertaking activities that would harm her public image. She won ten regional karting titles, and the World Karting Association Grand National Championship in the Yamaha Sportsman, and later HPV class three times: in 1994, 1996 and 1997. (Note: Patrick won a career-high 39 out of 49 kart races in 1996.)

Patrick was accepted into the Indianapolis-based Lyn St. James Foundation Driver Development Program in 1996. She was taught auto racing's business structure, and her driving abilities were further refined. Her father often contacted newspapers to chronicle his daughter's performance. Additionally, ABC and MTV ran television segments on Patrick in 1997. This exposure led to her being hired by John Mecom Jr. (introduced to Patrick by St. James two years earlier) to compete in the United Kingdom racing circuit. Patrick and her father visited Mecom's family, who agreed to sponsor her on the condition she was sent to a high-quality driving school for further refinement of her racing abilities. She ended up attending three driving schools, including Track Speed School at Sebring International Raceway and the Formula Ford driving school. Patrick later competed in a Sports Car Club of America race at Daytona International Speedway in May 1998.

== Junior Formula (1998–2004) ==
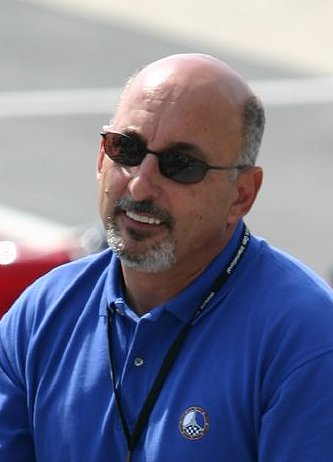
Bobby Rahal (pictured in 2004) hired Patrick on a three-year contract to race for his team, Rahal Letterman Racing.

Patrick's parents consented to her dropping out of high school midway through her junior year in 1998, and obtaining a GED certification. She moved by herself to England to advance her racing career and resided in the Buckinghamshire town of Milton Keynes. Three-time Formula One world champion Jackie Stewart helped Patrick and she socialized with drivers such as Jenson Button. Patrick received some financial backing from the Ford Motor Company; she later lost Mecom's support after one season following rumors that she was living an extravagant lifestyle. She successfully persuaded her father to underwrite her career.

During the three years Patrick spent in the United Kingdom, Patrick raced in Formula Vauxhall and Formula Ford, coming ninth in points in the 1999 British Formula Vauxhall Championship. She competed for Haywood Racing in Formula Ford and was Mygale's lead test driver. Patrick was uncompetitive in Formula Ford, claiming the equipment she received was of poor quality. Nevertheless, she came second in the 2000 Formula Ford Festival at Brands Hatch with Haywood Racing, tying Danny Sullivan's best performance by an American in the event. This led to her receiving a Formula Three test with Carlin in 2001. Jaguar Racing team principal Bobby Rahal organized a second test for her with the expectation it would lead to her being put in the Paul Stewart Racing development program; it was cancelled in mid-2001, after new owner Niki Lauda fired Rahal. That year, she was awarded the Gorsline Scholarship Award as the most aspiring road course competitor, and was recognized as the top female open wheel race car driver with experience on the international scene.

Patrick had a difficult season as her Mygale cars did not suit her smooth driving style, and she was outpaced by her teammates. Ford later terminated her program as they suspected the capital they gave her was being misused and felt she was not getting enough technical support. Patrick returned to the United States later that year after her funding dried up. She began negotiations to drive a BMW M3 for Team PTG in the American Le Mans Series in 2002, which ended when BMW withdrew over a technological dispute. Her 2002 campaign began with the fund-raising Toyota Pro/Celebrity Race, where she defeated Tommy Kendall to win the professional class, and placed third overall. Patrick and her father travelled to race tracks on weekends with expectations of her being hired by a team owner. She spoke to Rahal about a race seat in June that year; he signed her to a three-year contract at Milwaukee Mile. That month, Patrick tested the ppc Racing Ford Taurus NASCAR Busch Series car in a two-day test session at Greenville-Pickens Speedway.

Patrick took part in five races in the Barber Dodge Pro Series, placing thirteenth in points with a best finish of fourth at Molson Indy Vancouver. Patrick switched to the Toyota Atlantic Series in 2003, and was the first woman to race in the championship since 1974. The season saw her secure the first podium for a woman in series' history at the season-opening race in Monterey. She improved on this by finishing second in Miami at the year's end. Patrick was sixth in the drivers' standings with five top-five finishes. In June that year, she made her sports car debut at the Grand Prix of Atlanta, part of the American Le Mans Series, partnering Jérôme Policand in the No. 80 GTS-class Prodrive Ferrari 550, finishing fourth in class and tenth overall. In 2004, she competed in the Toyota Atlantic Series for the second consecutive year, becoming the first woman to win a pole position in series history at the Portland International Raceway race. She took the points lead after finishing second, making her the first woman to lead the championship standings. She ended the season third in points with ten top-five finishes in twelve races.

== IndyCar Series career ==
=== 2005–2007 (Rahal Letterman Racing and Andretti Green Racing) ===
In December 2004, Rahal Letterman Racing named Patrick to their IndyCar Series roster for 2005 after the team found the resources to run a third car. She debuted at the season-opening race at Homestead-Miami Speedway, starting ninth and sustaining a crash which led to her being hospitalized for a mild concussion. In the season's fourth race, the Indy Japan 300 at Twin Ring Motegi, Patrick started second and led 32 laps before settling for her best finish of the season, fourth. After setting the fastest overall practice speed at the Indianapolis 500, she started fourth and missed out on winning the race as she was required to conserve fuel. She came fourth after leading nineteen laps and achieved multiple firsts for women at the track. Patrick took her first career pole position at the season's eighth race at Kansas Speedway, becoming the second woman in IndyCar Series history to achieve the feat after Sarah Fisher in 2002. She took two more pole positions at Kentucky Speedway and Chicagoland Speedway to match Tomas Scheckter's record for the most pole positions in a rookie season. Patrick ended 2005 with an 18th-place finish at California Speedway after a crash with Jaques Lazier, finishing her rookie season with 325 points (12th in the points standings) and seven top-ten finishes. She was named Rookie of the Year for both the Indianapolis 500 and the IndyCar Series.

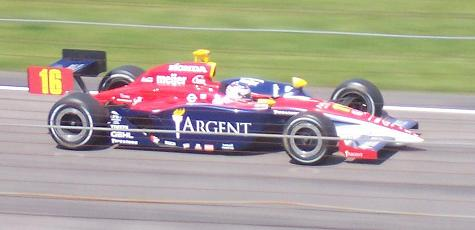
Patrick driving for Rahal Letterman Racing at the 2006 Indianapolis 500

Patrick returned to Rahal Letterman Racing for the 2006 season. In January, she made her endurance racing debut at the 24 Hours of Daytona, co-driving a Howard-Boss Motorsports Daytona Prototype-class Pontiac Crawford shared by Rusty Wallace, Allan McNish and Jan Lammers. The quartet was in contention for the victory, but retired due to overheating problems. Although she qualified third for the season-opening Toyota Indy 300, her team withdrew after teammate Paul Dana was killed in a practice session accident on the day of the race. Thus, Patrick's 2006 IndyCar campaign began at the first road course round of the season, the Grand Prix of St. Petersburg, where she finished sixth; she came eighth at the Indy Japan 300 at Motegi. At the Indianapolis 500, Patrick finished eighth after starting tenth. The rest of her season was modest with four top-tens, which included a season-high placing of consecutive fourth-position finishes: first at the Firestone Indy 200 at Nashville Speedway, and then the ABC Supply Company A.J. Foyt 225 at Milwaukee Mile. Patrick came ninth in the final standings with 302 points. In November, the March of Dimes awarded her the title of Sportswoman of the Year in celebration of her dedication and success.

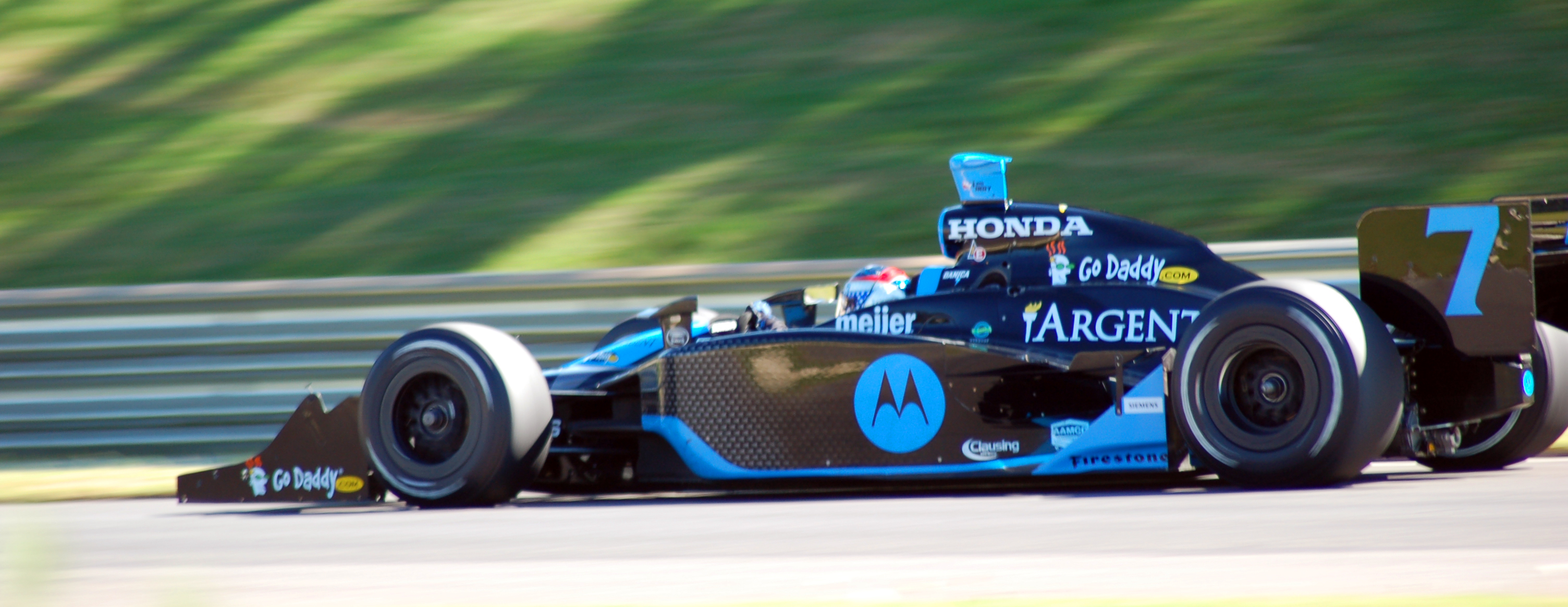
Patrick at a post-season test session at Barber Motorsports Park in October 2007

Before the 2007 season, Patrick moved to Andretti Green Racing, in place of Bryan Herta in its No. 7 Dallara-IR05 Honda. She opened her season with two top-ten finishes in the first four races (eighth at St. Petersburg and seventh at Kansas). Patrick started the Indianapolis 500 in eighth position. She raced competitively with the leaders and finished in the same position she started, when the race was halted by rain after 166 laps. Patrick clinched her second consecutive eighth-place finish at the ABC Supply Company A.J. Foyt 225 which was overshadowed by a physical confrontation with Dan Wheldon; the two reconciled after a private meeting with IndyCar president Brian Barnhart. She took her then best career finish with a third at the Bombardier Learjet 550, and improved on this result by clinching second at the season's penultimate race, the Detroit Indy Grand Prix at Belle Isle Street Circuit. Patrick closed off the year by coming eleventh at the season-closing Peak Antifreeze Indy 300 at Chicagoland Speedway, to place seventh in the drivers' standings with 424 points and eleven top-ten finishes.

=== 2008–2009 (first victory and peak performance) ===
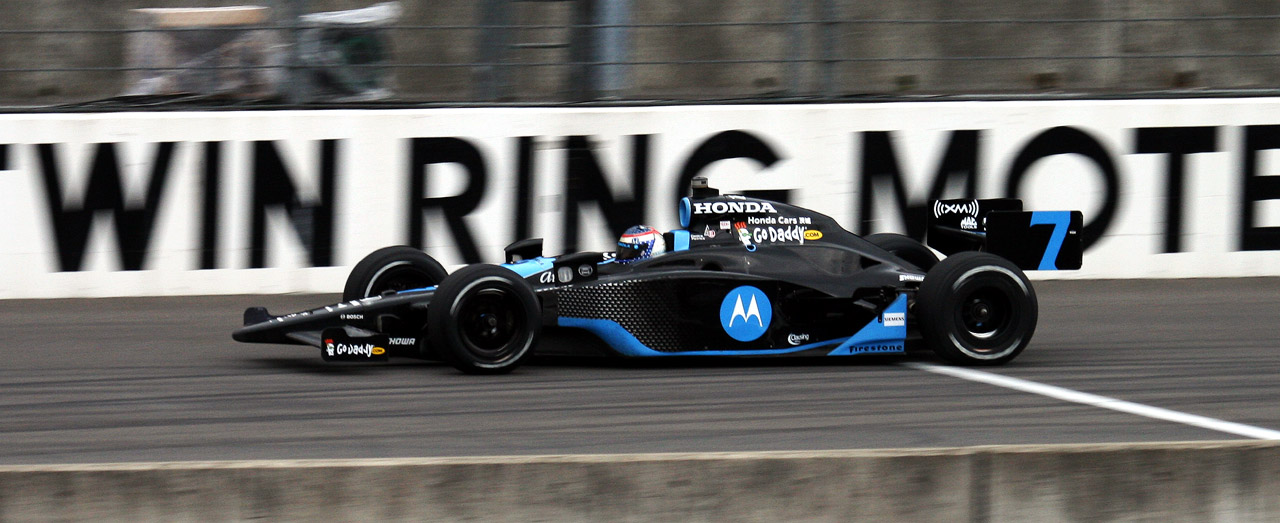
Patrick won her first race at the 2008 Indy Japan 300 and became the first woman to win an IndyCar Series event.

To begin the 2008 season, her second with Andretti Green Racing, Patrick scored her then-best career Homestead finish of sixth. She followed that up with another top ten by scoring a tenth-place finish at St. Petersburg. At the Indy Japan 300 at Twin Ring Motegi on April 20, Patrick moved to the front of the field with three laps remaining after the previous leaders were forced to make pit stops for fuel and held the first position to secure her maiden IndyCar victory. This made her the first woman to win a top-level sanctioned open wheel car racing event. At the season's fourth round at Kansas Speedway, she finished 19th after a hub failure. After qualifying fifth for the Indianapolis 500, she retired from the race early after a collision with Ryan Briscoe in the pit lane. Thereafter, she finished within the top ten for five of the next six races in the season. At Mid-Ohio Sports Car Course, an incident with Milka Duno in practice turned into a confrontation before walking away. She ended the season with three further top-ten finishes with a best of fifth at Infineon Raceway. She finished sixth in the final standings with 379 points, the highest placed American over the course of the season.

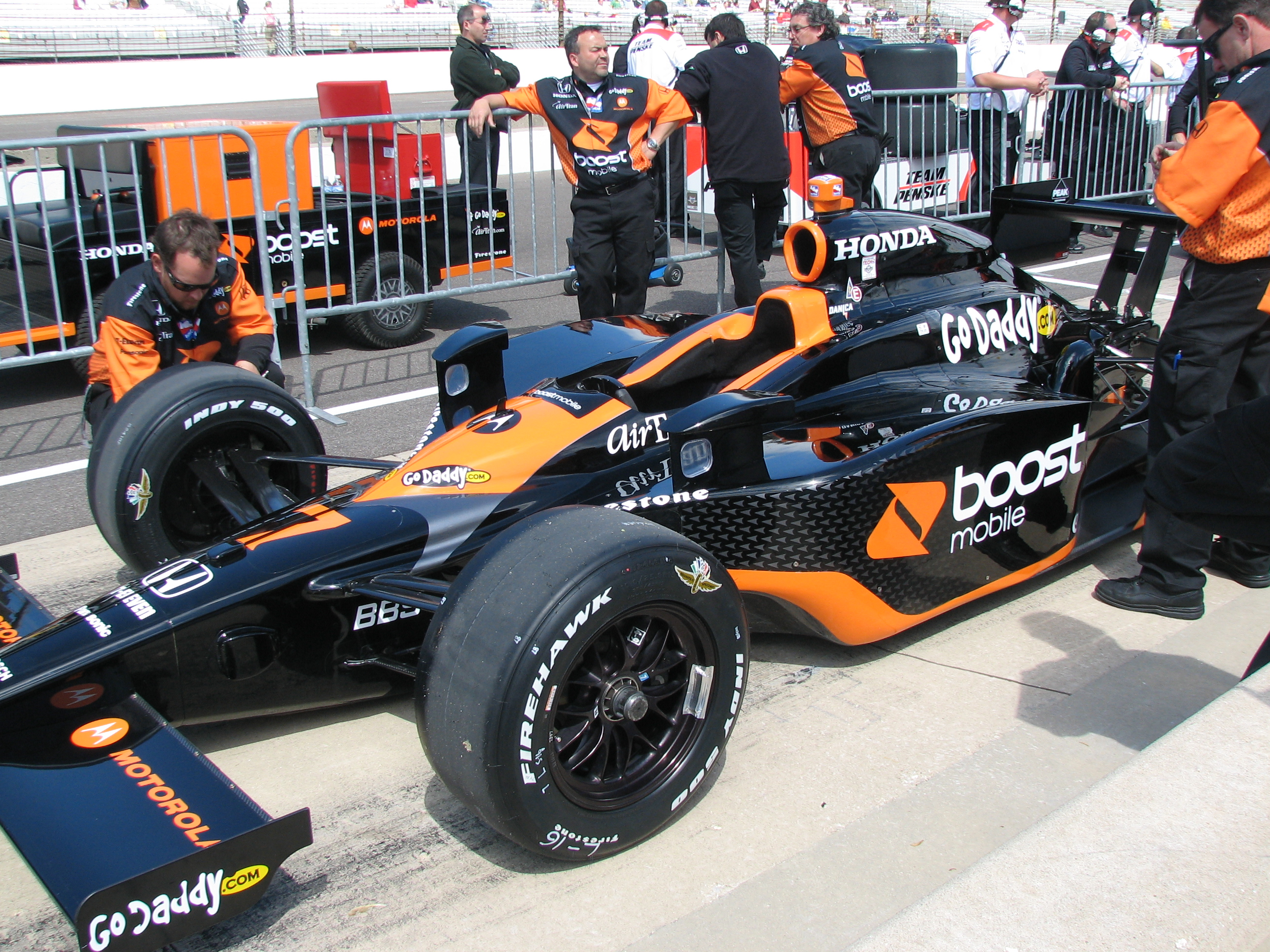
Patrick's car at the Indianapolis Motor Speedway in 2009

In the 2009 off-season, Patrick made her second appearance at the 24 Hours of Daytona and teamed up with Casey Mears, Andy Wallace, and Rob Finlay in the No. 2 Daytona Prototype class Pontiac Crawford DP08 fielded by Childress-Howard Motorsports, finishing eighth in class and overall after overcoming several mechanical issues. Patrick again returned to Andretti Green Racing for the 2009 season. She placed nineteenth in the first race of the season, the Grand Prix of St. Petersburg, after clashing with Raphael Matos while in ninth place. She recovered to finish fourth and fifth in the next two races of the season, at Long Beach and Kansas. She took her best career finish in five attempts at the Indianapolis 500 by finishing in third position. This set a new record for the highest-placed finish for a woman in Indianapolis 500 history. For the rest of the season, she scored seven more top-ten finishes with her best being a pair of fifth positions at the Milwaukee and Richmond races. She finished the season fifth overall in the point standings, her highest finish to date. This fifth-place finish was not only the highest of any of the Andretti drivers, but of any non-Penske or Chip Ganassi Racing driver for the season. In December, she signed a contract extension that would see her through the next two seasons, with the option for a third in 2012.

=== 2010–2011 (final two full-time IndyCar seasons) ===
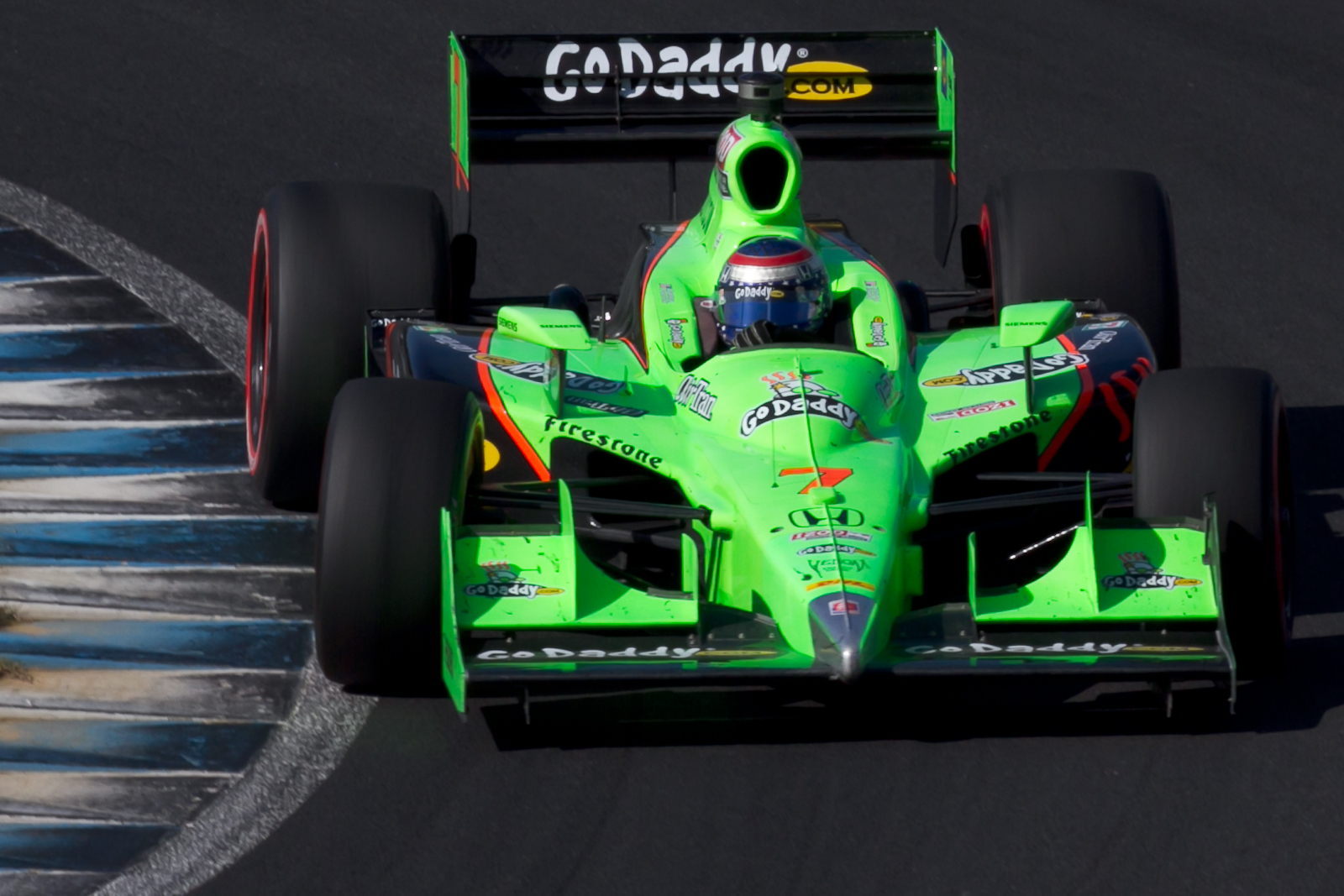
Patrick racing for Andretti at the 2011 Indy Japan: The Final

The 2010 season saw Patrick return to drive with the newly renamed Andretti Autosport in the IndyCar Series, as well as a limited schedule with JR Motorsports in the NASCAR Nationwide Series (now Xfinity Series). As in the previous year, her season began poorly as she could only muster a 15th-place finish at the inaugural São Paulo Indy 300 after spinning in inclement weather. Nevertheless, at the season's second round, the delayed Honda Grand Prix of St. Petersburg, she made her first appearance in the top in seventh. At the Indianapolis 500, she qualified a career low 23rd; in the race, Patrick struggled with her car en route to finishing sixth. The Firestone 550 at Texas Motor Speedway one week later was her best performance of the season, which saw her lead one lap and finish in second. At the Indy Grand Prix of Sonoma, she set a new series record for the most consecutive races running at the finish with her 29th event passing without her failing to finish. She ended her season by equaling her best result of the season in the final IndyCar race at Homestead-Miami Speedway which enabled her to finish tenth in the drivers' standings with 367 points.

In January 2011, Patrick's contract required her to inform Andretti team owner Michael Andretti of her plans for 2012, and she told him of her intention to leave. The beginning of the 2011 season saw her struggle in comparison with her previous two years at Andretti. She twice suffered car damage at the season-opening Grand Prix of St. Petersburg, after collisions with Justin Wilson and J. R. Hildebrand relegated her to twelfth. She struggled in qualifying for the Indianapolis 500. Because her car failed a technical inspection, she was placed at the back of the qualifying line and took 26th despite rain threatening to stop her setting a lap time. She led ten laps in the race and was tenth after conserving fuel. She then took a further six top-ten finishes heading into the final race of the season with her best finish (fifth) coming at the Milwaukee 225. At the season-closing IndyCar World Championship at Las Vegas Motor Speedway, Patrick was one of nineteen drivers who avoided a fifteen car pile-up that killed Dan Wheldon; the race was abandoned and she and the rest of the field were not scored. This was her final regular season IndyCar race as she announced in August 2011 of her plans to focus on the NASCAR Sprint Cup Series and Nationwide Series full-time from 2012. (Note: From 2012 to 2014, Patrick's re-numbered No. 27 car was driven by 2011 Rookie of the Year James Hinchcliffe.) She placed tenth in the drivers' standings with 314 points.

=== 2018 (Indianapolis 500) ===
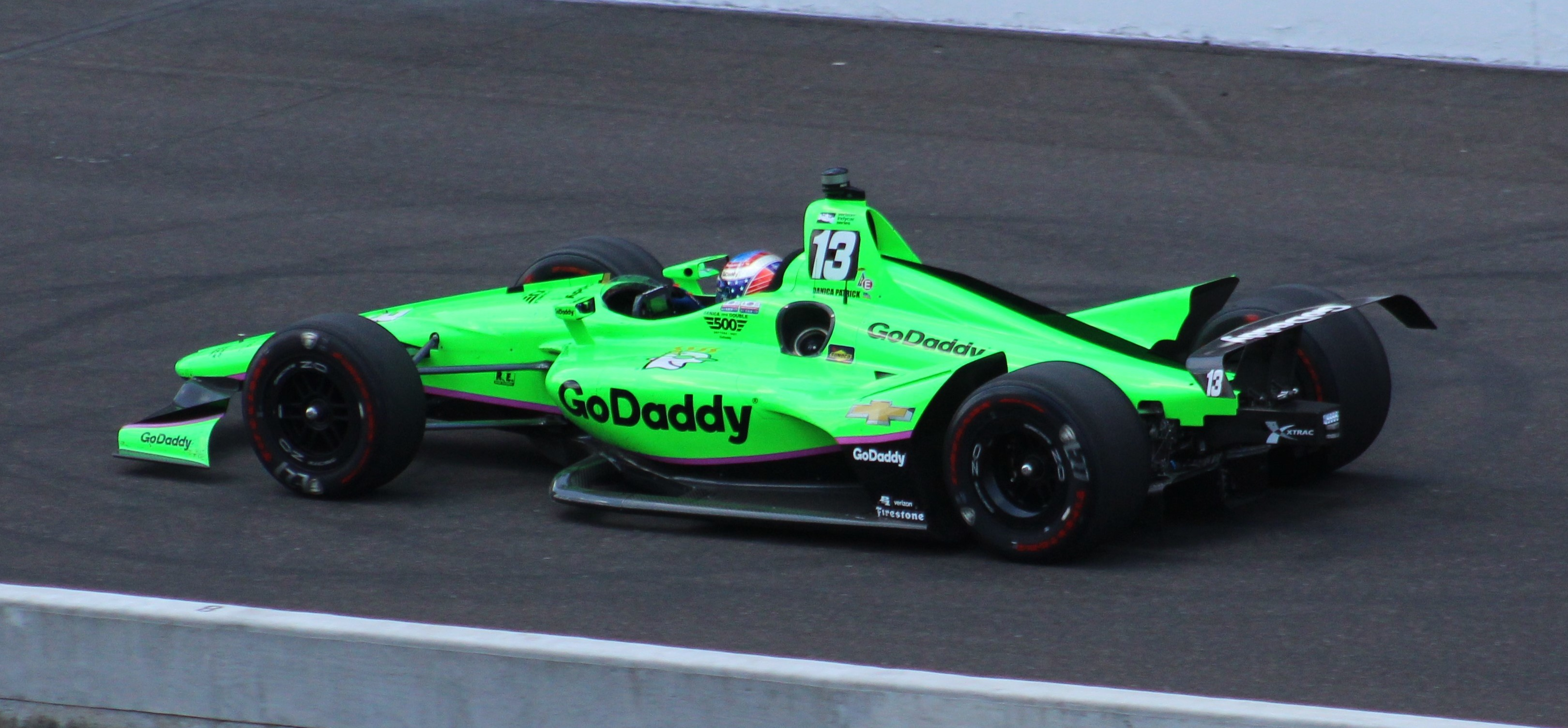
Patrick during the 2018 Indianapolis 500

Patrick's final race was the 2018 Indianapolis 500. Having difficulty with the car setup, she lost control going into turn two on Lap 68 and crashed into the outside wall. Patrick came back down the track and then hit the inside wall. Patrick started in seventh position and was ranked thirtieth.

== Stock car career ==
=== 2010–2011 (ARCA and Nationwide Series) ===
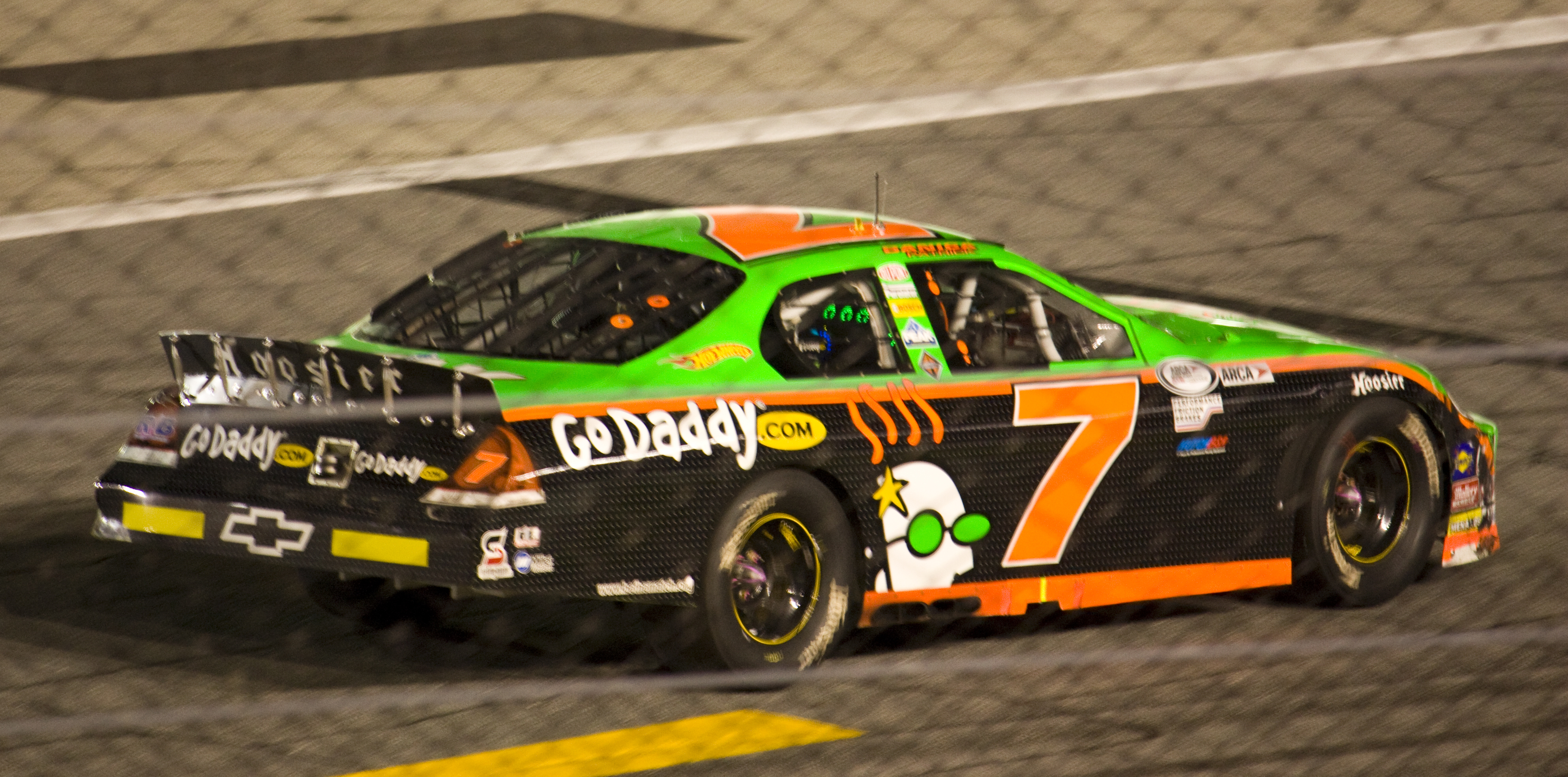
Patrick during her only ARCA start in 2010

Patrick began her stock car racing career by entering an ARCA Racing Series race in the No. 7 JR Motorsports Chevrolet at Daytona International Speedway. She finished in sixth place after spinning early in the race. At the season-opening Nationwide Series race, the DRIVE4COPD 300, she started fifteenth and finished 35th after being caught up in a twelve-car crash. In the season's third race, the Sam's Town 300 at Las Vegas Motor Speedway, she finished 36th after colliding with Michael McDowell on the 82nd lap. Although she struggled during her rookie season, she had her best finish of the year at the season-ending Ford 300 at Homestead-Miami Speedway where she came nineteenth. She finished 43rd in the drivers' standings, with 1,032 points in thirteen starts. In September, she entered the K&N Pro Series East race at Dover International Speedway to broaden her stock car racing experience. She finished sixth after briefly leading the race.

Patrick remained at JR Motorsports for the 2011 Nationwide Series, and ran a part-time schedule that consisted of twelve races. She finished 14th and 12th at the season's opening two races at Daytona and Phoenix International Speedway. She became the highest-finishing woman in national NASCAR history at Las Vegas when she surpassed Sara Christian's 62-year record to place fourth in the Sam's Town 300 race (the highest in her Nationwide Series career). She took her third top-ten finish of the season when she came in tenth in the Subway Jalapeño 250 at Daytona after leading a total of thirteen laps before being involved in a multi-car incident coming to the checkered flag on the last lap of the race. Her best performance throughout the rest of the season was an eleventh place finish at Texas Motor Speedway; she came 26th in points, with 321 accrued.

=== 2012–2014 (switch to the Sprint Cup Series) ===
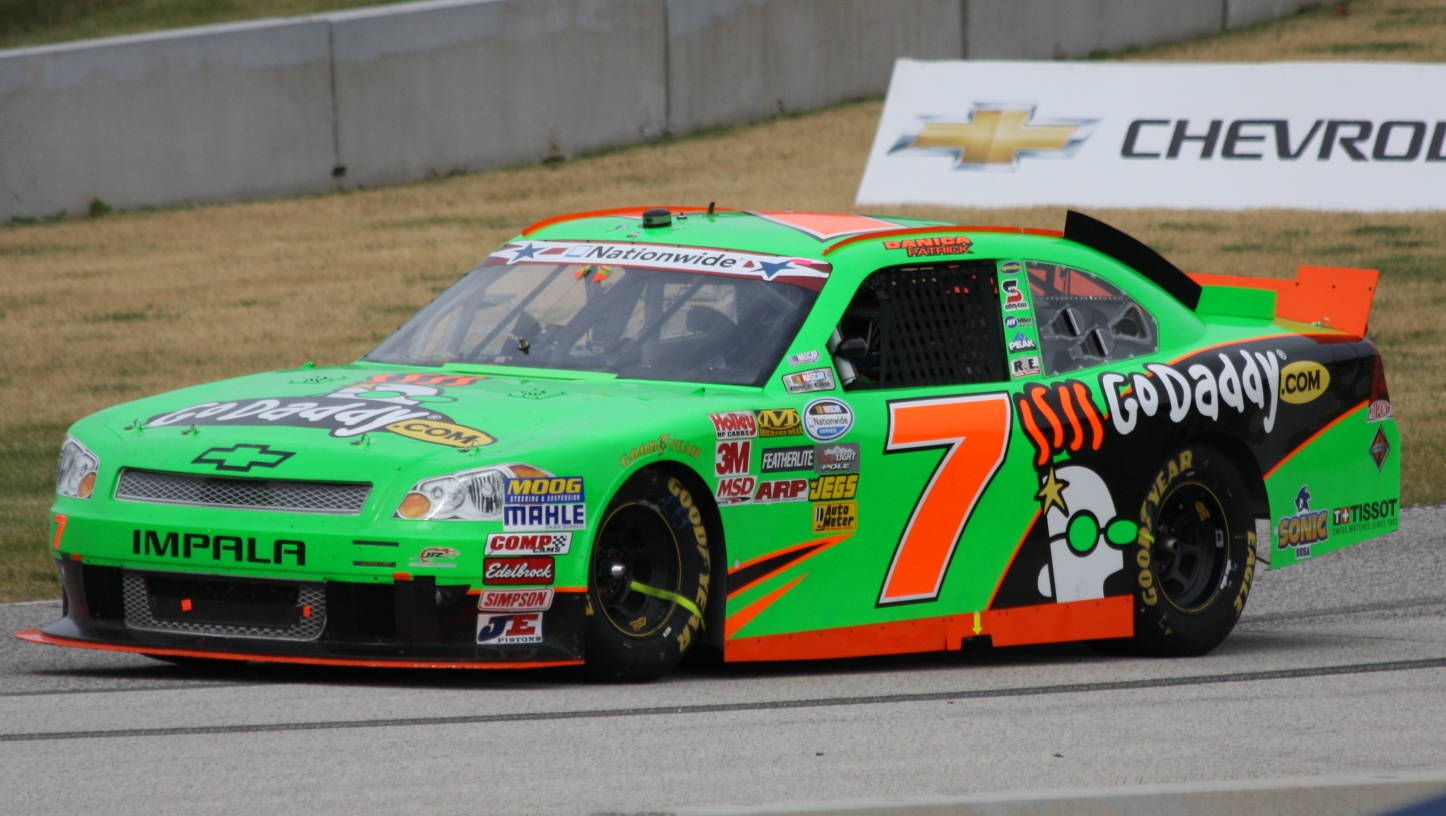
Patrick driving for JR Motorsports at the 2012 Sargento 200

In 2012, Patrick raced full-time in the Nationwide Series for JR Motorsports and began competing a limited schedule with ten races in the Sprint Cup Series with Stewart-Haas Racing in an alliance with Tommy Baldwin Racing (TBR) in the No. 10 Chevrolet Impala. (Note: The owner of the No. 7 Robby Gordon did not wish to hand the number to Patrick because he was building his operation around it.) Because TBR moved its top-35 owner points from the No. 36 driven by Dave Blaney to the new No. 10, she was guaranteed a spot at the Daytona 500. Patrick began her season by qualifying on the pole for the DRIVE4COPD 300, making her the second woman to achieve this feat in national NASCAR after Shawna Robinson in 1994. Her participation in the Daytona 500 was over after one lap when she was involved in a four-car accident, finishing 38th, 74 laps behind race winner Matt Kenseth. Patrick closed off her first full-time Nationwide Series season with four top-ten finishes, and placed tenth in the final points standings. Her season's best result was at Texas Motor Speedway where she came eighth. Patrick's best road course finish in her NASCAR career came at Circuit Gilles Villeneuve, coming ninth and led a season-high twenty laps.

Team owner Tony Stewart invited Patrick to compete in the fund-raising Prelude to the Dream dirt track race at Eldora Speedway in June. She finished three laps down in 15th place after hitting the wall and being off the pace. In her fourth Cup start, the Irwin Tools Night Race at Bristol Motor Speedway, she was running strong before she crashed on lap 436 from contact with Regan Smith, which became her first did not finish (DNF) in the series. Patrick had her first lead lap finish at the AAA Texas 500 at Texas Motor Speedway, finishing 24th, the last car on the same lap as the leaders. During the Hollywood Casino 400 at Kansas Speedway, Patrick spun Landon Cassill in turn one, but ended up wrecking her car on the outside wall. Cassill, who managed to save his car, said on his radio: "Rule No. 1 in stock car racing is learn how to wreck someone without wrecking yourself." Her final race of the season at Phoenix was embroiled in controversy as her car leaked oil and NASCAR elected not to wave the caution flags, causing an accident between Kurt Busch and Ryan Newman. This decision was criticized by drivers and team owners. With no top-tens, two DNFs and an average finish of 28.3 in her ten starts; Patrick was not classified in the final standings since she did not contest the full championship, so was ineligible to score points.

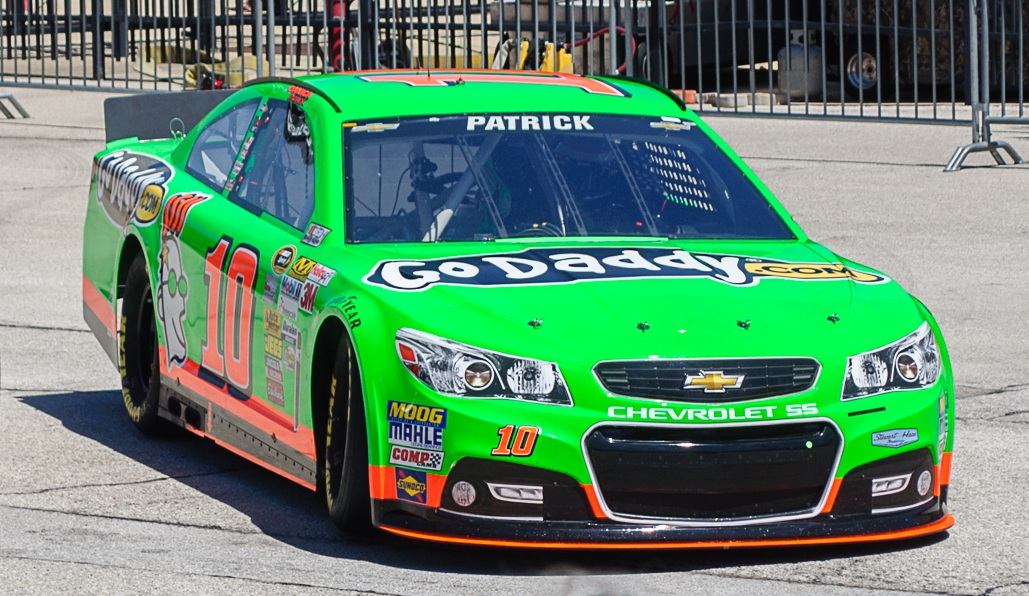
Patrick during practice for the 2013 NRA 500

In the 2013 season, Patrick returned to Stewart-Haas Racing to contest her first full season in the Sprint Cup Series. She was assigned teammate Ryan Newman's former crew chief Tony Gibson and his pit crew. Patrick simultaneously became the first woman to clinch the pole position for the Daytona 500 and the first female to achieve the feat in the Sprint Cup Series. She ran strongly in the top ten for most of the race, but fell back from third place in the final three laps to finish eighth, becoming the highest placing woman driver in the history of the Daytona 500. Having led five laps, she joined an elite club of only fourteen drivers to have led both the Daytona 500 and the Indianapolis 500. In the May exhibition Sprint Showdown at Charlotte Motor Speedway, Patrick finished ninth and advanced to the Sprint All-Star Race by virtue of a fan vote. She started from the 22nd position and finished two spots higher than that.

Patrick struggled after the season opener, failing to finish in the top-fifteen in the next 28 races over the next seven months. In 36 races, she had one top-ten, an average finish of 26.1, five DNFs and was 27th in the standings with 646 points. She was second in the Rookie of the Year standings after a season-long battle with Ricky Stenhouse Jr. In the Nationwide Series, Patrick drove the season-opening DRIVE4COPD 300 and the first of two races at Talladega Superspeedway, the Aaron's 312, in the No. 34 Turner Scott Motorsports car. She finished thirty-sixth and thirty-ninth after a respective engine failure and crash.

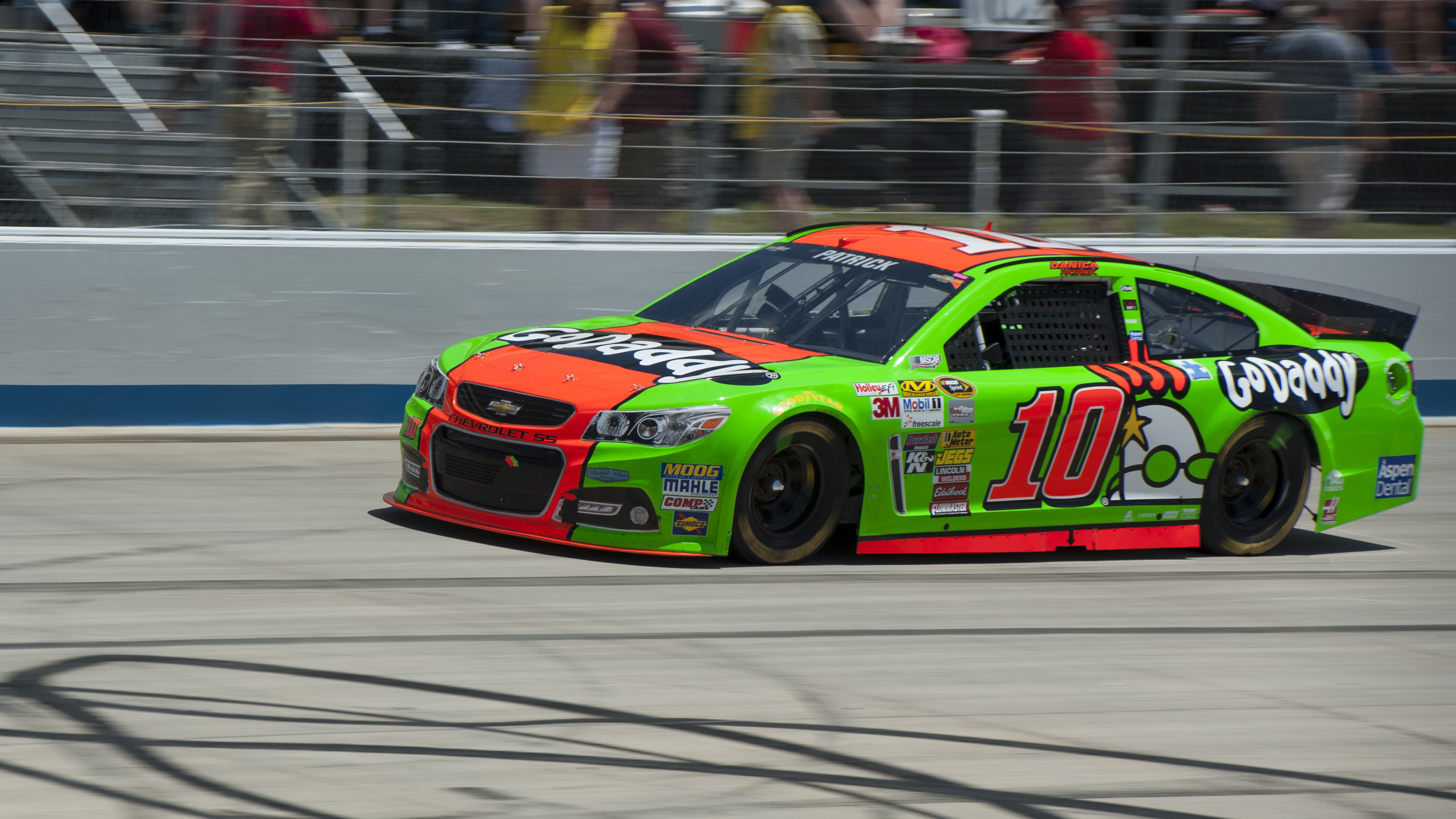
Patrick racing at Dover International Speedway in 2014

Patrick remained with Stewart-Haas Racing for the 2014 Sprint Cup Series. As she won the pole for the 2013 Daytona 500, she was eligible for the Sprint Unlimited, finishing sixteenth after being involved in a multi-car accident. Patrick started twenty-seventh for the Daytona 500 and led briefly during the pit stop cycle before Aric Almirola clipped her, sending her car into a wall that lacked a SAFER barrier; she finished 40th. She set three records during the season: the first came at the Aaron's 499 where she was the first female to lead at the track, and her finishing position of 22nd was the best for any woman at the circuit. Patrick had the best qualifying performance for any woman at a non-restrictor plate track when she put her car fourth on the grid for the Coca-Cola 600.

Patrick clinched her best finish in the Sprint Cup Series with a sixth at the Oral-B USA 500 at Atlanta Motor Speedway, making her the second woman to take a top ten at the circuit; this beat the record of Janet Guthrie's tenth-place finish in 1978. She was assigned teammate Kurt Busch's crew chief Daniel Knost and his pit crew for the season's final three races, and was later appointed her full-time crew chief for 2015. At the season's end, Patrick finished 28th in points, one position down from the previous year, although she finished with 89 more points than her rookie season. She also had an average finish of 23.7, 2.4 positions better than her rookie year, with three top-tens and four DNFs. Early in the season, Patrick again drove for Turner Scott Motorsports in its No. 34 car at the season-opening DRIVE4COPD 300, starting third and finishing 19th.

=== 2015–2018 (final years in NASCAR) ===
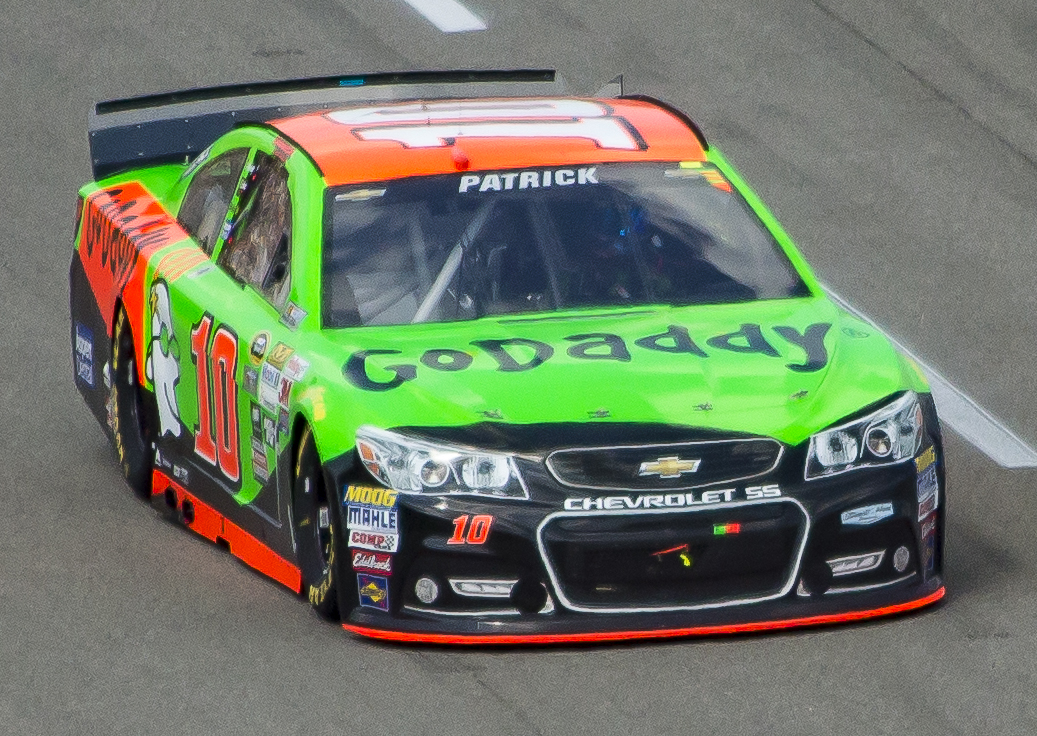
Patrick racing at Michigan International Speedway in 2015

For 2015, Patrick again stayed with Stewart-Haas Racing. She began her season in the Sprint Unlimited by finishing tenth after escaping with collateral damage from a multi-car accident. Patrick started at the back of the field for the season-opening Daytona 500 and finished 21st. After scoring two top-tens (seventh at the STP 500 at Martinsville Speedway and ninth at the Food City 500 at Bristol Motor Speedway), she eclipsed Janet Guthrie for the most top tens by a woman in Sprint Cup Series history. Patrick led two laps of the Quicken Loans 400 at Michigan International Speedway during the pit stop cycle, and finished 16th, and at the Quaker State 400, she became the first woman to start a hundred Cup Series races. At the Fall Martinsville race, she had twenty-five owner and drivers points deducted, was fined $50,000, and put on probation by NASCAR until the end of 2015 for an intentional retaliatory crash against David Gilliland. In 36 races, Patrick scored 716 points, placing her 24th in the drivers' standings, the highest of her career. She had two top-ten finishes, an average finish of 23.5, and failed to finish four times.

Patrick had signed a multi-year contract which allowed her to stay at Stewart-Haas Racing for 2016. She also switched crew chiefs from Daniel Knost to Billy Scott for the upcoming season. At the first race of the season, the Daytona 500, she retired when she made contact with Greg Biffle on the 184th lap, spun into the grass and heavily damaged her car's front end. Patrick was fined $20,000 for gesturing to Kasey Kahne after he wrecked her car at the Auto Club 400. She was involved in a high-speed crash with Matt Kenseth at Talladega which necessitated a chest radiograph. Patrick struggled with form during the season, but did improve her average result for the fifth consecutive year to a career-high 22.0 in thirty-six starts. Her best result of the season was eleventh place at the fall Charlotte race, and she led a career-high 30 laps. Patrick was again 24th in the final drivers' standings, but had fewer points than the previous season, at 689 accrued, and did not finish three races she entered.

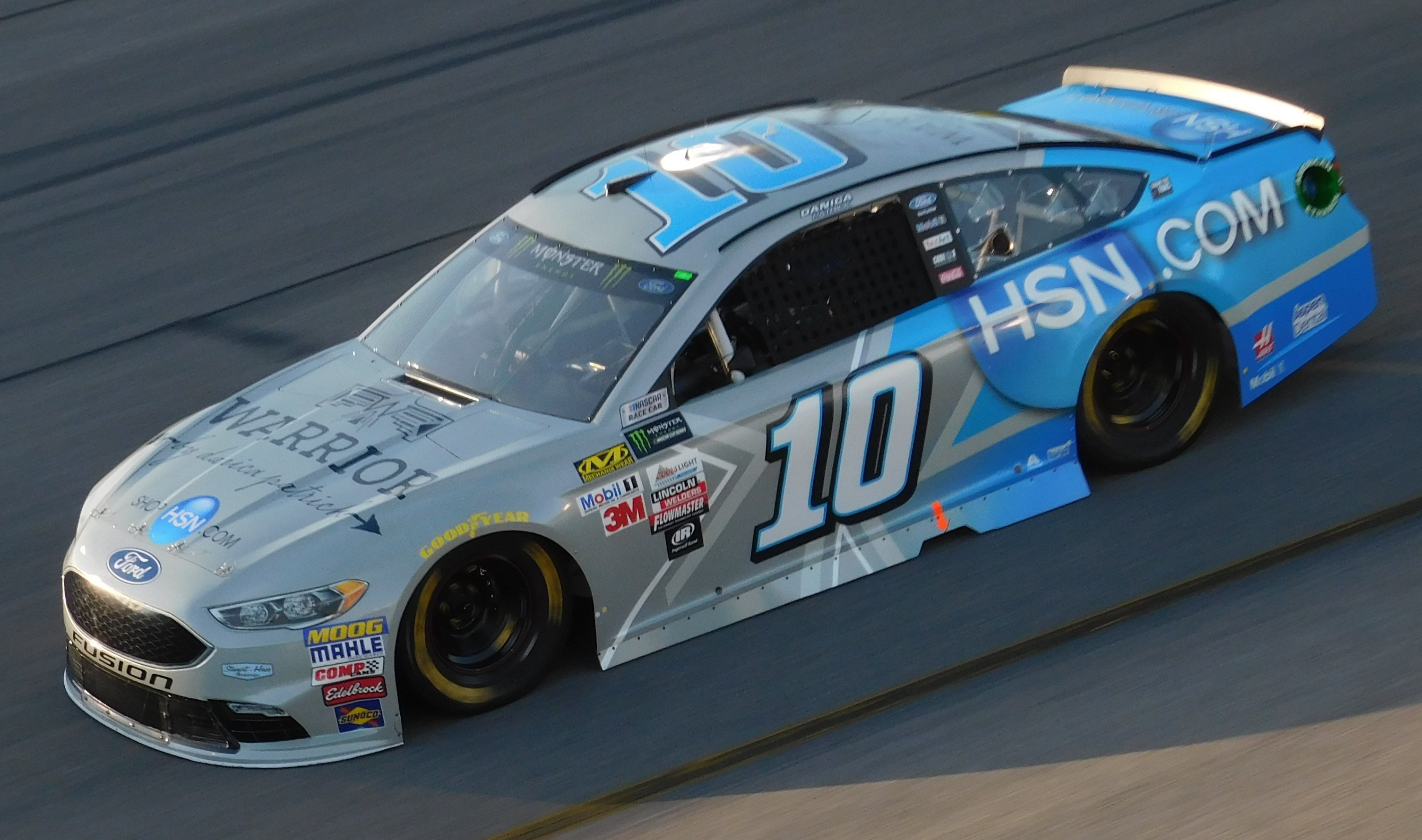
Patrick racing at Richmond Raceway in 2017

Patrick remained with Stewart-Haas Racing for the duration of the renamed Monster Energy NASCAR Cup Series in 2017. She began her campaign with her best finish in any NASCAR Cup Series race with a fourth place at the Advance Auto Parts Clash exhibition race at Daytona. Patrick was credited with a 33rd-place finish for the season-opening Daytona 500 after she was forced into retirement from being caught up in a multi-car accident. She later took her first top-ten finish in seventy-seven races when she placed tenth at Dover on June 4. On November 17, Patrick announced that she would step away from full-time racing after the season finale at Homestead-Miami, though she also announced plans to compete in the 2018 Daytona 500 and 2018 Indianapolis 500. She retired halfway through when her right-rear tire blew after glancing the wall and she collided heavily with another barrier. Patrick finished the 2017 season with one top-ten, eleven DNFs and an average finish of 23.8. She scored 511 points, putting her twenty-eighth in the drivers' standings.

In January 2018, it was announced that Patrick would be reunited with longtime partner GoDaddy for sponsorship of the "Danica Double" and assistance as she moved on to her life as a business woman and entrepreneur. For her final NASCAR race at the 2018 Daytona 500, Patrick signed with Premium Motorsports to drive its No. 7 Chevrolet Camaro ZL1 after discussions with Chip Ganassi Racing did not yield in a race seat. Her final Daytona 500 came to an early end when she was involved in a six-car accident on lap 102, placing 35th in the final results. Patrick concluded her NASCAR career with no wins, and finished in the top ten in 3.6% of her 191 races. On March 7, 2018, it was announced that her final Indianapolis 500 appearance would be in a third car for Ed Carpenter Racing.

=== Formula One speculations ===
Patrick was scheduled to test for Formula One team Honda in November 2008, but this was called off when the Honda team pulled out of the sport. In late 2009, the American Formula One team US F1 allegedly considered testing Patrick for a potential drive in 2010. However, she said she was not contacted by anyone from the team and had no plans to leave the IndyCar Series for Formula One at the time. After the announcement of the return of Formula One to the United States in 2012, Formula One chief executive Bernie Ecclestone said that "to have someone like Danica Patrick in F1 would be a perfect advert." However, in 2015, Patrick asserted that she had no desire to move into Formula One, because she was too old to switch racing series; she said that she felt more comfortable being around her family and friends in NASCAR.

== Media appearances ==
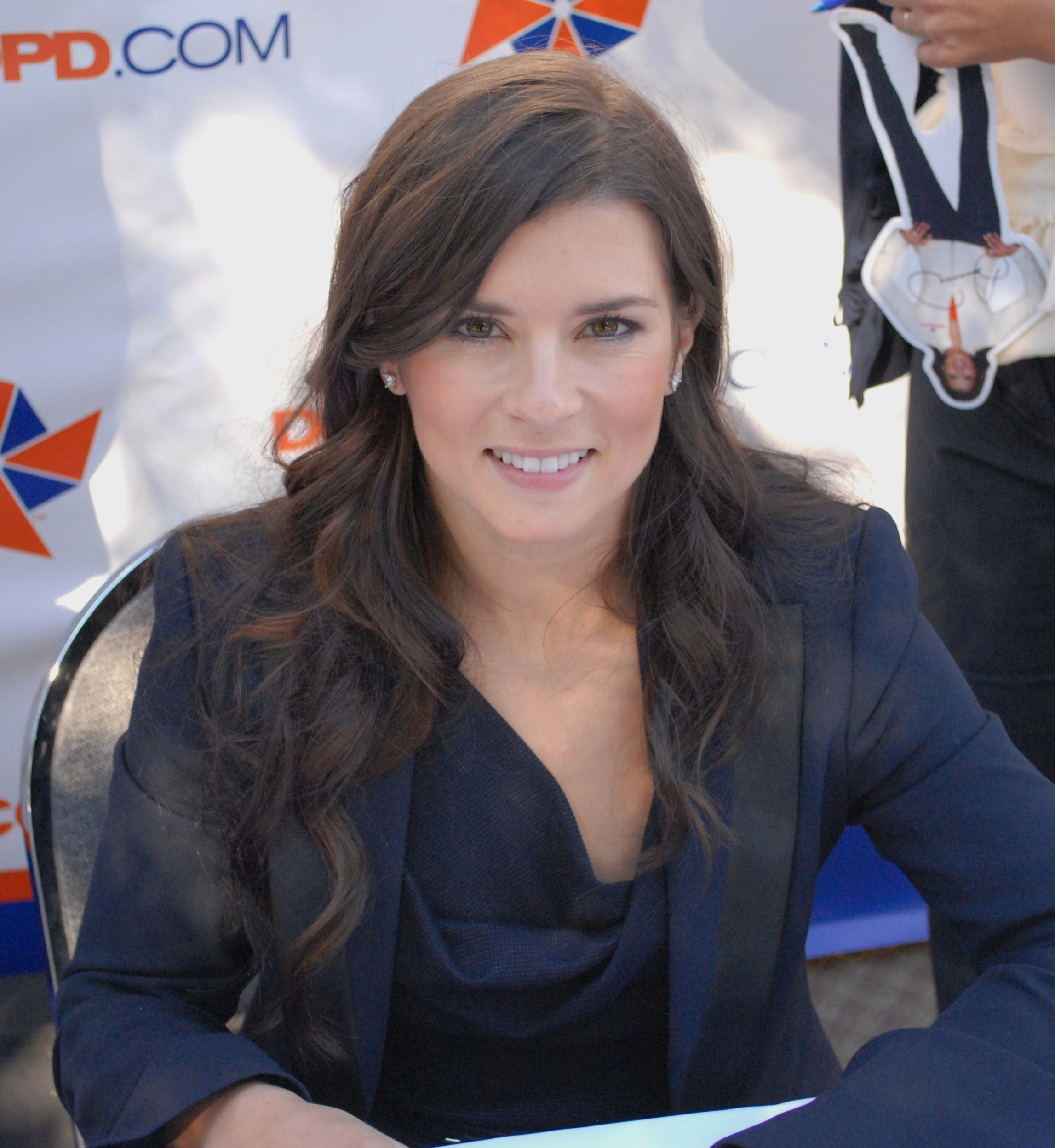
Patrick in 2010

Patrick has hosted several TV shows on Spike, including "Powerblock", and featured in the 2005 documentary Girl Racers. She drove a Pagani Zonda Roadster around the streets of Monaco in the music video of Jay-Z's song "Show Me What You Got" in 2006. That year, she published her autobiography, Danica: Crossing the Line. On April 24, 2008, Patrick was a guest on the Late Show with David Letterman after winning her first IndyCar race. During testing at Phoenix International Raceway, GoDaddy.com filmed a commercial with her that aired nationally. At the same test, at GoDaddy's invitation, Patrick met with Paul Teutul Sr., and Mikey Teutul, and later appeared in an episode of American Chopper. She was also in a 2008 "inspirational, feel-good" GoDaddy commercial called "Kart" that features a girl who aspires to be like Patrick. On February 1, 2009, Patrick appeared in two GoDaddy commercials aired during Super Bowl XLIII. The Most Watched Super Bowl commercial of 2009, according to TiVo, was her "Enhancement" ad for GoDaddy.com. Patrick has appeared in a total of fourteen Super Bowl commercials, more than any other celebrity.

Patrick made her acting debut in the February 10, 2010 episode of CSI: NY, in which she played a race car driver suspected of murder. She also voiced herself in a cameo role in The Simpsons episode "How Munched Is That Birdie in the Window?" and was featured as a character on a 2010 episode of South Park called "Poor and Stupid". Patrick appears as a playable guest character in the video game Sonic & All-Stars Racing Transformed, providing her own voice and appeared in the game's commercial. She also appeared in Archie Comics' Sonic Universe #45, which adapted some of the game storyline. NASCAR on Fox hired Patrick on February 21, 2015, as a booth analyst for Xfinity Series races. She provided commentary for the race at Michigan. Patrick also voices the race car character Rally in Nickelodeon's Blaze and the Monster Machines 2016 animated series. In June 2017, she joined Fox's Cup driver-only broadcast of the Xfinity Series race at Pocono Raceway, working in the studio alongside Denny Hamlin. A documentary entitled Danica which chronicles Patrick's professional and personal life premiered on November 8 on Epix. Her second book, Pretty Intense, was released on December 26. Patrick had a cameo role in Maroon 5's "Girls Like You" featuring Cardi B. On July 18, 2018, she became the first woman to host the ESPY Awards.

Patrick has been a studio analyst for NBC's broadcasts of the Indianapolis 500 each year since 2019. In August 2019, she launched a weekly podcast called Pretty Intense in which she discusses success, spirituality, and consciousness with guests. She joined the Sky Sports F1 broadcast team as a pundit for the 2021 United States Grand Prix. Patrick also commentated on Superstar Racing Experience events on CBS in 2021 and was a guest color commentator for the NASCAR Cup Series races at Las Vegas and Phoenix for Fox in 2022 and 2023. She became a pundit for the sixth season of the Netflix documentary series Formula 1: Drive to Survive in 2024. Patrick was dropped by Sky Sports F1 in March 2026.

=== Endorsements and philanthropy ===
IMG talent agency and Excel Sports Management represent Patrick. She has appeared in advertising campaigns for AirTran Airways, Boost Mobile, Secret, Nationwide Insurance, Tissot, Chevrolet, Coca-Cola, Peak Antifreeze, William Rast, Hot Wheels, GoDaddy.com, Nature's Bakery, Lyft,OPI and Endurance Warranty. Patrick promotes health-conscious lifestyles and partnered with Williams Sonoma to campaign for No Kid Hungry. She is the celebrity spokeswoman for DRIVE4COPD, an awareness campaign for chronic obstructive pulmonary disease, from which her grandmother died. In 2014, she joined The Players' Tribune as a featured writer, having been immediately attracted to founder and former shortstop Derek Jeter's concept of allowing athletes to write and control their own content.

=== Business ventures ===
Patrick owns her own brand of wine, called Somnium, which means "dream" in Latin. The Somnium Vineyard is located in the area of St Helena, California within the Howell Mountain AVA, covering an area of 24 acres (9.7 hectares), at elevations from 1,000 to 1,375 feet (305 to 419 m). Patrick owns her own athleisure collection, called "Warrior by Danica Patrick", that was created in partnership with G-III Apparel Group and named after the Native American mythology she had been exposed to in Arizona.

== Public image ==
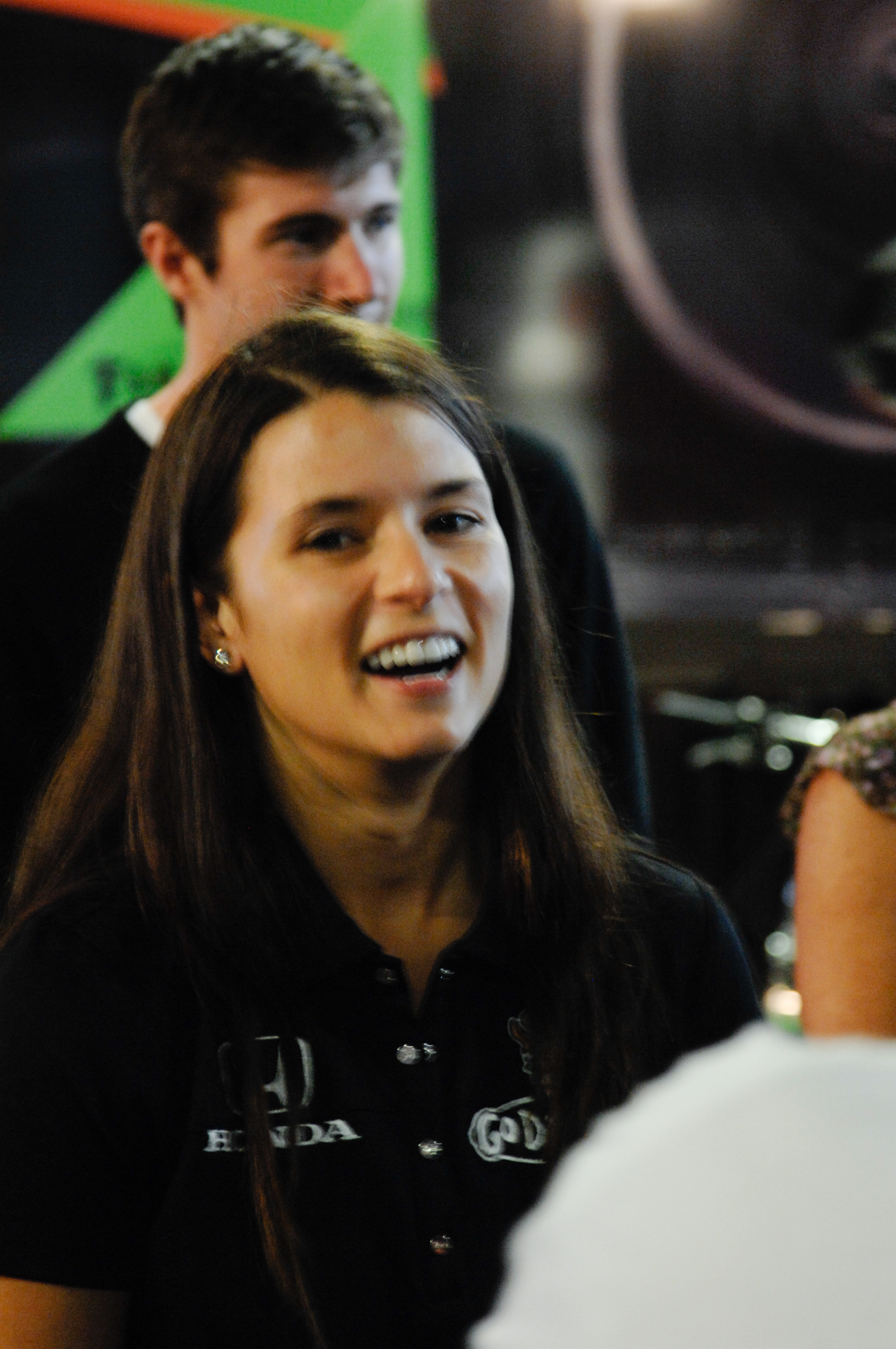
Patrick at the 2010 Honda Grand Prix of St. Petersburg

In a 2017 article for The Guardian, Andrew Lawrence described Patrick as "an anti-Mulan" who infiltrated and thrived in a male environment while accentuating her womanhood. He also said she is "an instrument of male and female fantasy, the sports pinup who grinds harder for feminism, day-to-day, than the great Billie Jean King ever could". Henry Hutton of the Independent Tribune noted that when Patrick entered IndyCar in 2005, she rapidly became a pop culture icon largely due to her gender and modelling, but her driver profile depreciated from car problems, racetrack accidents and uncompetitiveness.

She has been a magazine cover model for FHM, Sports Illustrated, TV Guide and ESPN: The Magazine and ranked highly on beauty lists and in polls, about female athletes. People magazine named her one of the most beautiful people in the world in 2006. The following year, Patrick was voted the sexiest athlete in the Victoria's Secret "What is Sexy" list. She was voted No. 42 in 2006 and No. 85 in 2007 in FHM's 100 sexiest women in the world. In an interview with Fox News in 2012, Patrick objected to being labeled a sex symbol: "People don't know how to describe women in a pretty way. Do you call Blake Griffin a sex symbol because he was on the cover of Men's Health with his shirt off? People just don't know what to call women who look attractive." She expressed a different view five years later, saying she felt "awesome" about being a sex symbol: "The exposure that was generated because of being female and using my attributes — it works."

Patrick has featured on sports power and popularity lists. Bloomberg Businessweek ranked her the 50th and 88th most powerful person in the world of sports in 2008 and 2010, respectively. Time magazine named her a candidate for the 100 most influential people in the world in 2009 and 2010. She has been highly ranked in the Davie-Brown Index for several years, and peaked at number eight among female athletes in 2010. Patrick was the Harris Poll's favorite female athlete in 2008; she placed second behind tennis player Serena Williams in 2007 and again from 2013 to 2015. Between 2007 and 2013, she appeared on Forbes' list of the 100 highest paid celebrities four times, ranking in the bottom quartile and was 93rd on the magazine's list of the World's 100 Most Powerful Women in 2010. Her endorsement deals generated a Q Score—the industry's measure of celebrities' likability—peak of 29 in 2010.

=== Impact and reception ===
Patrick's strong fan base voted her the IndyCar Series Most Popular Driver from 2005 to 2010 and the NASCAR Nationwide Series Most Popular Driver in 2012. She was voted the Favorite Female Athlete at the Kids' Choice Award in 2008, 2012 and 2013. She also won the legend award at the 2018 Kids' Choice Sports. Increasing attendance at auto racing events and improved television ratings have been attributed to Patrick by scholars and the press. She has inspired many young girls' interest in motorsports, leading them to race competitively. Some have credited her with preventing the dissolution of the IndyCar Series, and strengthening support for NASCAR. Patrick has been called a trailblazer or pioneer for women in auto racing, and commentators agree her achievements have broken the gender barrier in an industry that is overwhelmingly male.

Patrick has come under scrutiny from the media and fans throughout her career. (Note: Auto racing enthusiasts have coined the phrase "Danicamania" for the heavy press coverage Patrick has received.) She has been called a "gimmick" or a "publicity stunt" by some fans for lack of better racing results. Critics have compared her with former tennis player Anna Kournikova for her lack of on-track success and promotion of her looks, though the similarities have been questioned by others. Prior to her 2008 Indy Japan 300 triumph, Patrick was criticized by commentators and fans who claimed her ~100 lb (45 kg) body weight constituted an unfair advantage. Indy Racing League president Brian Barnhart responded that her weight "had a virtually minimal effect on the competition". In June 2013, former NASCAR driver Kyle Petty called Patrick a "marketing machine" and asserted that she was not a race car driver. In February 2014, during an appearance at the eighth annual Canadian Motorsports Expo, Kyle's father, Richard Petty, criticized her for not winning more races.

Patrick has been accused of promoting conspiracy theories through her podcast. In June 2023, she was criticized for engaging a discussion about alien involvement in human DNA. From late 2023, Patrick began sharing her political views on social media.

== Personal life ==
In 2005, Patrick married Paul Edward Hospenthal, whom she met at his office in 2002 for physical therapy while recovering from her hip injury sustained during a yoga session. They divorced in 2013. Patrick was in relationships with fellow NASCAR driver Ricky Stenhouse Jr. (from 2012 to 2017) and then Green Bay Packers quarterback Aaron Rodgers (from 2018 to 2020). In 2021, Patrick was reported to be in a relationship with American businessman Carter Comstock. In 2022, she confirmed that they had ended their relationship.

In October 2024, Patrick shared via Instagram that she had voted for the first time in her life at the age of 42, and had voted for Donald Trump in the 2024 United States presidential election.

== Filmography ==
Danica Patrick film and television credits
Year	Title	Role	Notes
2008	American Chopper	Herself	Episode: "Go Daddy Bike 2"
2010	CSI: NY	Liza Gray	Episode: "The Formula"
2010	The Simpsons	Herself (voice)	Episode: "How Munched Is That Birdie in the Window?"
2013	Chopped	Herself (contestant)	Episode: "Sports Stars"
2014	American Restoration	Herself (guest)	Episode: "NASCAR History 300: Dales of Thunder"
2015	The Kitchen	Herself	Episode: "Tackle Your Tailgate"
2016	Blaze and the Monster Machines	Rally (voice)	4 episodes
2017	American Ninja Warrior	Herself (guest)	Episode: "Cleveland Qualifiers"
2017–2019	Mickey Mouse Mixed-Up Adventures	Danni Sue (voice)	3 episodes
2019	Charlie's Angels	Driving Instructor	Theatrical film
2019	Project Runway All Stars	Herself (guest judge)	Episode: "Pedal to the Medal"
2020	Beat Bobby Flay	Herself (guest judge)	Episode: "Ready Set Grill"
2021	Running Wild with Bear Grylls	Herself	Episode: "Danica Patrick in the Moab Desert"
2024	Drive to Survive	Herself	Formula 1: Drive to Survive (season 6)

=== Music videos ===
Year	Title	Artist(s)	Role	Ref.
2006	"Show Me What You Got"	Jay-Z	Herself	
2012	"Fastest Girl in Town"	Miranda Lambert	Car Thief	
2013	"Girl Ridin' Shotgun"	Joe Diffie and D Thrash of Jawga Boyz	Herself (cameo)	
2013	"Drivin' Around Song"	Colt Ford featuring Jason Aldean	Girlfriend	
2018	"Girls Like You" (Original, Volume 2 and Vertical Video versions)	Maroon 5 featuring Cardi B	Herself (cameo)	

=== Video games ===
Year	Title	Role	Notes
2012	Sonic & All-Stars Racing Transformed	Herself (voice)	Playable character

== Motorsports career results ==
=== Career summary ===
Season	Series	Team	Car No.	Races	Wins	Poles	FLaps	Points	Position
1998	Formula Vauxhall Winter Series								
1999	British Formula Vauxhall Championship							31	9th
2000	British Formula Ford Championship	Andy Welch Racing		14	0	0	0	3	19th
2000	Formula Ford Festival	Haywood Racing	89	1	0	0	0	N/A	2nd
2000	European Formula Ford Championship	Haywood Racing							
2001	British Formula Ford Championship	Haywood Racing			0	0	0	10	25th
2002	Barber Dodge Pro Series	Team Rahal	89	5	0	0	0	35	13th
2003	American Le Mans Series GTS class	Veloqx Prodrive Racing	80	1	0	0	0	10	23rd
2003	Toyota Atlantic Championship	Team Rahal	24	12	0	0	0	109	6th
2004	Toyota Atlantic Championship	Team Rahal	24	12	0	1	1	269	3rd
2005	IndyCar Series	Rahal Letterman	16	17	0	3	1	325	12th
2006	IndyCar Series	Rahal Letterman	16	13	0	0	0	302	9th
2006	Rolex Sports Car Series (24 Hours of Daytona) DP class	Howard-Boss Motorsports	2	1	0	0	0	7	106th
2007	IndyCar Series	Andretti Green Racing	7	17	0	0	1	424	7th
2008	IndyCar Series	Andretti Green Racing	7	18	1	0	0	379	6th
2009	IndyCar Series	Andretti Green Racing	7	17	0	0	0	393	5th
2009	Rolex Sports Car Series (24 Hours of Daytona) DP class	Childress-Howard Motorsports	2	1	0	0	0	23	43rd
2010	IndyCar Series	Andretti Autosport	7	17	0	0	0	367	10th
2010	NASCAR Nationwide Series	JR Motorsports	7	13	0	0	0	1032	43rd
2010	NASCAR K&N Pro Series East	JR Motorsports	83	1	0	0	0	155	45th
2010	ARCA Racing Series	Bob Schacht Motorsport	7	1	0	0	0	200	85th
2011	IndyCar Series	Andretti Autosport	7	17*	0	0	0	314	10th
2011	NASCAR Nationwide Series	JR Motorsports	7	12	0	0	0	321	26th
2012	NASCAR Nationwide Series	JR Motorsports	7	33	0	1	0	838	10th
2012	NASCAR Sprint Cup Series	Stewart-Haas Racing	10	10	0	0	0	0	62nd
2013	NASCAR Sprint Cup Series	Stewart-Haas Racing	10	36	0	1	0	646	27th
2013	NASCAR Nationwide Series	Turner Scott Motorsports	34	2	0	0	0	0	128th
2014	NASCAR Sprint Cup Series	Stewart-Haas Racing	10	36	0	0	0	735	28th
2014	NASCAR Nationwide Series	Turner Scott Motorsports	30	1	0	0	0	0	108th
2015	NASCAR Sprint Cup Series	Stewart-Haas Racing	10	36	0	0	0	716	24th
2016	NASCAR Sprint Cup Series	Stewart-Haas Racing	10	36	0	0	0	689	24th
2017	Monster Energy NASCAR Cup Series	Stewart-Haas Racing	10	36	0	0	0	511	28th
2018	IndyCar Series	Ed Carpenter Racing	13	1	0	0	0	13	33rd
2018	Monster Energy NASCAR Cup Series	Premium Motorsports	7	1	0	0	0	2	43rd

* IndyCar Series Race 18 was abandoned due to the death of Dan Wheldon after 13 laps.
** Season still in progress

=== American open-wheel racing ===
(key) (Races in bold indicate pole position) (Races in italics indicate fastest lap) (Small number denotes finishing position)

==== Barber Dodge Pro Series ====
Barber Pro Series results
Year	1	2	3	4	5	6	7	8	9	10	Rank	Points	Ref
2002	SEB	LIM	LAG	POR	TOR; 7	CLE; 7	VAN; 4	MOH; 11	ROA	MTL; 22	13th	35	

==== Toyota Atlantic Championship ====
Toyota Atlantic results
Year	Team	1	2	3	4	5	6	7	8	9	10	11	12	Rank	Points	Ref
2003	Team Rahal	MTY; 3	LBH; 14	MIL; 6	LS; 13	POR; 6	CLE; 5	TOR; 10	TRR; 5	MOH; 10	MTL; 7	DEN; 5	MIA; 2	6th	109	
2004	Team Rahal	LBH; 5	MTY; 3	MIL; 4	POR1; 2	**POR2**; 7	CLE; 3	TOR; 4	VAN; 4	ROA; 4	DEN; 5	MTL; 4	LS; 8	3rd	269	

Years	Teams	Races	Poles	Wins	Podiums (Non-win)**	Top 10s (Non-podium)***	Championships	Ref
2	1	24	1	0	5	17	0	

** Podium (Non-win) indicates second or third place finishes.
*** Top 10s (Non-podium) indicates fourth through tenth place finishes.

==== IndyCar Series ====
IndyCar Series results
Year	Team	Chassis	No.	Engine	1	2	3	4	5	6	7	8	9	10	11	12	13	14	15	16	17	18	19	Rank	Points	Ref
2005	Rahal Letterman Racing	Panoz	16	Honda	HMS; 15	PHX; 15	STP; 12	MOT; 4	INDY; 4	TXS; 13	RIR; 10	**KAN**; 9	NSH; 7	MIL; 19	MIS; 20	**KEN**; 16	PPIR; 8	SON; 20	**CHI**; 6	WGL; 16	FON; 18			12th	325	
2006	Rahal Letterman Racing	Panoz	16	Honda	HMS^{1} DNS	STP; 6	MOT; 8	INDY; 8	WGL; 8								SON; 8							9th	302	
2006	Rahal Letterman Racing	Dallara	16	Honda						TMS; 12	RIC; 15	KAN; 11	NSH; 4	MIL; 4	MIS; 17	KEN; 8		CHI; 12						9th	302	
2007	Andretti Green Racing	Dallara	7	Honda	HMS; 14	STP; 8	MOT; 11	KAN; 7	INDY; 8	MIL; 8	TXS; 3	IOW; 13	RIC; 6	WGL; 11	NSH; 3	MOH; 5	MIS; 7	KEN; 16	SON; 6	DET; 2	CHI; 11			7th	424	
2008	Andretti Green Racing	Dallara	7	Honda	HMS; 6	STP; 10	MOT^{2} 1	LBH^{2}	KAN; 19	INDY; 22	MIL; 9	TXS; 10	IOW; 6	RIC; 6	WGL; 14	NSH; 5	MOH; 12	EDM; 18	KEN; 11	SON; 5	DET; 16	CHI; 10	SRF^{3} 18	6th	379	
2009	Andretti Green Racing	Dallara	7	Honda	STP; 19	LBH; 4	KAN; 5	INDY; 3	MIL; 5	TXS; 6	IOW; 9	RIC; 5	WGL; 11	TOR; 6	EDM; 11	KEN; 8	MOH; 19	SON; 16	CHI; 12	MOT; 6	HMS; 19			5th	393	
2010	Andretti Autosport	Dallara	7	Honda	SAO; 15	STP; 7	ALA; 19	LBH; 16	KAN; 11	INDY; 6	TXS; 2	IOW; 10	WGL; 20	TOR; 6	EDM; 15	MOH; 21	SNM; 16	CHI; 14	KTY; 9	MOT; 5	HMS; 2			10th	367	
2011	Andretti Autosport	Dallara	7	Honda	STP; 12	ALA; 17	LBH; 7	SAO; 23	INDY; 10	TXS; 16	TXS; 8	MIL; 5	IOW; 10	TOR; 19	EDM; 9	MOH; 21	NHA; 6	SON; 21	BAL; 6	MOT; 11	KEN; 10	LVS^{4} C		10th	314	
2018	Ed Carpenter Racing	Dallara DW12	13	Chevrolet	STP	PHX	LBH	ALA	IMS	INDY; 30	DET	DET	TXS	ROA	IOW	TOR	MOH	POC	GTW	POR	SON			38th	13	

* Season still in progress.

^{1} Rahal-Letterman Racing withdrew both Patrick and Buddy Rice from competition when their teammate Paul Dana was killed in a race-morning practice session accident.
^{2} Because of Reunification prior to the start of the 2008 IRL season, a compromise was established where teams were permitted to run either the Indy Japan 300 on April 20 with the IRL formula and rules or the Long Beach Grand Prix the same day with the old Champ Car formula and rules. Both races were for full IRL points.
^{3} Non-points race
^{4} The Las Vegas Indy 300 was abandoned after Dan Wheldon died from injuries sustained in a 15-car crash on lap 11.

Years	Teams	Races	Poles	Wins	Podiums (Non-win)**	Top 10s (Non-podium)***	Indianapolis 500 wins	Championships
7	3	114	3	1	6	63	0	0

** Podium (Non-win) indicates second or third place finishes.
*** Top 10s (Non-podium) indicates fourth through tenth place finishes.

==== Indianapolis 500 ====
Year	Chassis	Engine	Start	Finish	Team
2005	Panoz	Honda	4	4	Rahal Letterman Racing
2006	Panoz	Honda	10	8	Rahal Letterman Racing
2007	Dallara	Honda	8	8	Andretti Green Racing
2008	Dallara	Honda	5	22	Andretti Green Racing
2009	Dallara	Honda	10	3	Andretti Green Racing
2010	Dallara	Honda	23	6	Andretti Autosport
2011	Dallara	Honda	25	10	Andretti Autosport
2018	Dallara	Chevrolet	7	30	Ed Carpenter Racing

=== Sports car racing ===
==== American Le Mans Series ====
American Le Mans Series results
Year	Entrant	Class	Chassis	Engine	Tyres	1	2	3	4	5	6	7	8	9	Rank	Points	Ref
2003	Veloqx Prodrive Racing	GTS	Ferrari 550-GTS Maranello	Ferrari 5.9L V12	**M**	SEB	ATL ovr:10 cls:4	SON	TRO	MOS	AME	MON	MIA	PET	23rd	10	

==== Grand-Am Rolex Sports Car Series ====
(key) (Races in bold indicate pole position, Results are overall/class) (Small number denotes finishing position)

Rolex Sports Car Series results
Year	Team	Make	Engine	Class	1	2	3	4	5	6	7	8	9	10	11	12	13	14	Rank	Points	Ref
2006	Howard-Boss Motorsports	Crawford DP03	Pontiac	DP	DAY; **50/24**	MEX	HOM	LBH	VIR	LAG	PHX	LRP	WAT1	DAY2	BAR	WAT2	INF	MIL	106th	7	
2009	Childress-Howard Motorsports	Crawford DP08	Pontiac	DP	DAY; **8/8**	VIR	NJ	LAG	WAT	MOH	DAY2	BAR	WAT2	CGV	MIL	HOM			43rd	23	

==== 24 Hours of Daytona ====
24 Hours of Daytona results
Year	Class	No.	Team	Car	Co-drivers	Laps	Position	Class Pos.
2006	DP	2	Howard-Boss Motorsports	Pontiac Crawford DP03	Jan Lammers; Allan McNish; Rusty Wallace	273	50 ^{DNF}	24 ^{DNF}
2009	DP	2	Childress-Howard Motorsports	Pontiac Crawford DP08	Andy Wallace; Rob Finlay; Casey Mears	702	8	8

=== NASCAR ===
(key) (Bold – Pole position awarded by qualifying time. Italics – Pole position earned by points standings or practice time. * – Most laps led. Small number denotes finishing position.)

==== Monster Energy Cup Series ====
Monster Energy NASCAR Cup Series results
Year	Team	No.	Make	1	2	3	4	5	6	7	8	9	10	11	12	13	14	15	16	17	18	19	20	21	22	23	24	25	26	27	28	29	30	31	32	33	34	35	36	MENCC	Pts	Ref
2012	Stewart-Haas Racing	10	Chevy	DAY; 38	PHO	LVS	BRI	CAL	MAR	TEX	KAN	RCH	TAL	DAR; 31	CLT; 30	DOV	POC	MCH	SON	KEN	DAY	NHA	IND	POC	GLN	MCH	BRI; 29	ATL; 29	RCH	CHI; 25	NHA	DOV; 28	TAL	CLT	KAN; 32	MAR	TEX; 24	PHO; 17	HOM	62nd	0^{1}	
2013	Stewart-Haas Racing	10	Chevy	**DAY**; 8	PHO; 39	LVS; 33	BRI; 28	CAL; 26	MAR; 12	TEX; 28	KAN; 25	RCH; 29	TAL; 33	DAR; 28	CLT; 29	DOV; 24	POC; 29	MCH; 13	SON; 29	KEN; 23	DAY; 13	NHA; 37	IND; 30	POC; 35	GLN; 20	MCH; 23	BRI; 26	ATL; 21	RCH; 30	CHI; 20	NHA; 27	DOV; 29	KAN; 43	CLT; 20	TAL; 33	MAR; 17	TEX; 25	PHO; 33	HOM; 20	27th	646	
2014	Stewart-Haas Racing	10	Chevy	DAY; 40	PHO; 36	LVS; 21	BRI; 18	CAL; 14	MAR; 32	TEX; 27	DAR; 22	RCH; 34	TAL; 22	KAN; 7	CLT; 39	DOV; 23	POC; 37	MCH; 17	SON; 18	KEN; 21	DAY; 8	NHA; 22	IND; 42	POC; 30	GLN; 21	MCH; 18	BRI; 27	ATL; 6	RCH; 16	CHI; 19	NHA; 19	DOV; 25	KAN; 16	CLT; 26	TAL; 19	MAR; 34	TEX; 36	PHO; 22	HOM; 18	28th	735	
2015	Stewart-Haas Racing	10	Chevy	DAY; 21	ATL; 16	LVS; 27	PHO; 26	CAL; 19	MAR; 7	TEX; 16	BRI; 9	RCH; 25	TAL; 21	KAN; 27	CLT; 22	DOV; 15	POC; 37	MCH; 16	SON; 24	DAY; 35	KEN; 34	NHA; 24	IND; 27	POC; 16	GLN; 17	MCH; 25	BRI; 27	DAR; 42	RCH; 19	CHI; 26	NHA; 40	DOV; 21	CLT; 19	KAN; 22	TAL; 27	MAR; 40	TEX; 16	PHO; 16	HOM; 24	24th	716	
2016	Stewart-Haas Racing	10	Chevy	DAY; 35	ATL; 20	LVS; 21	PHO; 19	CAL; 38	MAR; 16	TEX; 21	BRI; 27	RCH; 24	TAL; 24	KAN; 20	DOV; 13	CLT; 21	POC; 32	MCH; 21	SON; 19	DAY; 27	KEN; 17	NHA; 14	IND; 22	POC; 22	GLN; 21	BRI; 22	MCH; 23	DAR; 24	RCH; 15	CHI; 24	NHA; 18	DOV; 28	CLT; 11	KAN; 18	TAL; 20	MAR; 24	TEX; 24	PHO; 29	HOM; 19	24th	689	
2017	Stewart-Haas Racing	10	Ford	DAY; 33	ATL; 17	LVS; 36	PHO; 22	CAL; 26	MAR; 23	TEX; 24	BRI; 36	RCH; 18	TAL; 38	KAN; 36	CLT; 25	DOV; 10	POC; 16	MCH; 37	SON; 17	DAY; 25	KEN; 15	NHA; 13	IND; 11	POC; 15	GLN; 22	MCH; 22	BRI; 25	DAR; 26	RCH; 23	CHI; 18	NHA; 18	DOV; 18	CLT; 38	TAL; 21	KAN; 38	MAR; 17	TEX; 17	PHO; 25	HOM; 37	28th	511	
2018	Premium Motorsports	7	Chevy	DAY; 35	ATL	LVS	PHO	CAL	MAR	TEX	BRI	RCH	TAL	DOV	KAN	CLT	POC	MCH	SON	CHI	DAY	KEN	NHA	POC	GLN	MCH	BRI	DAR	IND	LVS	RCH	ROV	DOV	TAL	KAN	MAR	TEX	PHO	HOM	47th	2	

===== Daytona 500 =====
Year	Team	Manufacturer	Start	Finish
2012	Stewart-Haas Racing	Chevrolet	29	38
2013	Stewart-Haas Racing	Chevrolet	**1**	8
2014	Stewart-Haas Racing	Chevrolet	27	40
2015	Stewart-Haas Racing	Chevrolet	20	21
2016	Stewart-Haas Racing	Chevrolet	16	35
2017	Stewart-Haas Racing	Ford	12	33
2018	Premium Motorsports	Chevrolet	28	35

==== Nationwide Series ====
NASCAR Nationwide Series results
Year	Team	No.	Make	1	2	3	4	5	6	7	8	9	10	11	12	13	14	15	16	17	18	19	20	21	22	23	24	25	26	27	28	29	30	31	32	33	34	35	NNSC	Pts	Ref
2010	JR Motorsports	7	Chevy	DAY; 35	CAL; 31	LVS; 36	BRI	NSH	PHO	TEX	TAL	RCH	DAR	DOV	CLT	NSH	KEN	ROA	NHA; 30	DAY	CHI; 24	GTY	IRP	IOW	GLN	MCH; 27	BRI	CGV	ATL	RCH	DOV; 35	KAN	CAL; 30	CLT; 21	GTY; 22	TEX; 22	PHO; 32	HOM; 19	43rd	1032	
2011	JR Motorsports	7	Chevy	DAY; 14	PHO; 17	LVS; 4	BRI; 33	CAL	TEX	TAL	NSH	RCH	DAR	DOV	IOW	CLT	CHI; 10	MCH	ROA	DAY; 10	KEN	NHA	NSH	IRP	IOW	GLN	CGV; 24	BRI	ATL	RCH; 18	CHI	DOV	KAN; 15	CLT	TEX; 11	PHO; 21	HOM; 32		26th	321	
2012	JR Motorsports	7	Chevy	**DAY**; 38	PHO; 21	LVS; 12	BRI; 19	CAL; 35	TEX; 8	RCH; 21	TAL; 13	DAR; 12	IOW; 30	CLT; 13	DOV; 30	MCH; 18	ROA; 12	KEN; 12	DAY; 31	NHA; 14	CHI; 14	IND; 35	IOW; 11	GLN; 43	CGV; 27	BRI; 9	ATL; 13	RCH; 29	CHI; 12	KEN; 14	DOV; 16	CLT; 11	KAN; 10	TEX; 14	PHO; 10	HOM; 13			10th	838	
2013	Turner Scott Motorsports	34	Chevy	DAY; 36	PHO	LVS	BRI	CAL	TEX	RCH	TAL; 39	DAR	CLT	DOV	IOW	MCH	ROA	KEN	DAY	NHA	CHI	IND	IOW	GLN	MOH	BRI	ATL	RCH	CHI	KEN	DOV	KAN	CLT	TEX	PHO	HOM			128th	0^{1}	
2014	Turner Scott Motorsports	30	Chevy	DAY; 19	PHO	LVS	BRI	CAL	TEX	DAR	RCH	TAL	IOW	CLT	DOV	MCH	ROA	KEN	DAY	NHA	CHI	IND	IOW	GLN	MOH	BRI	ATL	RCH	CHI	KEN	DOV	KAN	CLT	TEX	PHO	HOM			108th	0^{1}	

==== K&N Pro Series East ====
NASCAR K&N Pro Series East results
Year	Team	No.	Make	1	2	3	4	5	6	7	8	9	10	NKNPSEC	Pts	Ref
2010	JR Motorsports	83	Chevy	GRE	SBO	IOW	MAR	NHA	LRP	LEE	JFC	NHA	DOV; 6	45th	155	

^{*} Season still in progress
^{1} Ineligible for series points

=== ARCA Racing Series ===
(key) (Bold – Pole position awarded by qualifying time. Italics – Pole position earned by points standings or practice time. * – Most laps led. Small number denotes finishing position.)

ARCA Racing Series results
Year	Team	No.	Make	1	2	3	4	5	6	7	8	9	10	11	12	13	14	15	16	17	18	19	20	ARSC	Pts	Ref
2010	JR Motorsports	7	Chevy	DAY; 6	PBE	SLM	TEX	TAL	TOL	POC	MCH	IOW	MFD	POC	BLN	NJE	ISF	CHI	DSF	TOL	SLM	KAN	CAR	85th	200	

== See also ==
- List of American women's firsts
- List of Daytona 500 pole position winners
- List of female Indianapolis 500 drivers
- List of female NASCAR drivers

== Notes and references ==
=== References ===
Awards and achievements
Preceded by Kosuke Matsuura	Indianapolis 500; Rookie of the Year; 2005	Succeeded by Marco Andretti
Preceded by Kosuke Matsuura	IndyCar Series; Rookie of the Year; 2005	Succeeded by Marco Andretti
Preceded by Sam Hornish Jr.	IndyCar Series Most Popular Driver; 2005–2010	Succeeded by Dan Wheldon
Preceded by Elliott Sadler	NASCAR Nationwide Series Most Popular Driver; 2012	Succeeded by Regan Smith
