= Sports on Netflix =

Netflix has occasionally acquired rights to sporting events. The platform's live sports strategy has focused primarily on broadcasts that can be promoted as television events, including one-off competitions (such as combat sports cards, and isolated rights to specific events held by professional leagues) and tournaments, rather than pursuing rights to full, season-length packages.

== History ==
Initial involvement in sports content by Netflix was primarily focused on reality-style docuseries following specific leagues and competitions; its Formula One documentary series Drive to Survive has received critical acclaim, and has been credited with helping expand interest in F1 among new audiences, especially in the United States. Netflix would later commission similar series from its producers following professional golf (Full Swing) and tennis (Break Point).

In November 2023, Netflix streamed its first live sporting event, the Netflix Cup—a celebrity match play golf event from Las Vegas featuring teams of drivers and golfers from Drive to Survive and Full Swing respectively.

In January 2024, Netflix announced a ten-year agreement with professional wrestling promotion WWE beginning in January 2025, under which its weekly show WWE Raw would move exclusively to Netflix worldwide. In addition, Netflix would hold global rights outside of the United States to all three of WWE's main weekly programs (including Raw, SmackDown, and NXT), all WWE pay-per-view and livestreaming events, and library content.

In March 2024, Netflix announced that it had acquired a package of National Football League Christmas Day games, featuring two games in 2024 and at least one annual game in 2025 and 2026. Production of the telecasts were subcontracted to CBS Sports, using NFL on CBS personnel. As per NFL television rules, these games are simulcast on free-to-air television stations in the participating teams' home markets.

In November 2024, Netflix streamed the Jake Paul vs. Mike Tyson boxing match from AT&T Stadium in Arlington, Texas, along with its co-main event of Katie Taylor vs. Amanda Serrano for the WBA, WBC, IBF, WBO, and The Ring women's light welterweight titles. With a peak concurrent viewership of 65 million viewers claimed by Netflix, it overtook the 2023 ICC Men's Cricket World Cup final (57 million concurrent streams in India on Hotstar) as the most concurrent streams on a live-streamed sporting event, although Netflix faced criticism for technical faults and stability issues during the broadcast. With an average minute audience of 47 million, Netflix also stated that the Taylor vs. Serrano match was the most-watched professional women's sporting event in U.S. history. The following month, Netflix acquired exclusive U.S. rights to the 2027 and 2031 FIFA Women's World Cup. Netflix would also acquire exclusive Canadian rights to both tournaments.

In June 2025, Netflix acquired global rights to the Canelo Álvarez vs. Terence Crawford boxing match, the inaugural event promoted by Zuffa Boxing.

In August 2025, Netflix acquired exclusive rights to the 2026 World Baseball Classic in Japan, with Nippon Television subcontracted to produce the broadcasts. In November 2025, as part of a realignment of Major League Baseball's broadcast rights following a renegotiation of ESPN's contract, Netflix acquired rights to selected MLB special events under a three-year deal beginning in 2026, including a primetime "Opening Night" game, the Home Run Derby, and a special regular-season event game. The telecasts are produced by MLB Network.

In December 2025, Netflix hired former ESPN reporter Elle Duncan to serve as a lead studio host for its sports coverage, including MLB and NFL events, and other live non-sports events.

In February 2026, in conjunction with Formula One's new U.S. broadcast rights held by Apple TV, Netflix announced that it would sublicense the eighth series of Drive to Survive to Apple TV, with all episodes premiering simultaneously with its premiere on Netflix. Apple would, in return, sublicense rights for Netflix to simulcast the 2026 Canadian Grand Prix in the United States.

In April 2026, Netflix announced its acquisition of rights in Mexico to the CONCACAF Nations League final and CONCACAF Gold Cup beginning in 2027. In May 2026, Netflix renewed its NFL package through 2029; beginning in the 2026 season, the service holds rights to additional regular season games, including a week 1 game (which, for 2026, was the NFL International Series game in Melbourne), a week 12 Wednesday-night "Thanksgiving Eve" game, a Week 18 game, and at least one Christmas Day game per-season beginning in 2027. It will also become exclusive broadcaster of the NFL Honors beginning in 2027.

== Current sports properties ==
=== Canada ===
- FIFA (2027–2031)
  - 2027 FIFA Women's World Cup
  - 2031 FIFA Women's World Cup

=== Mexico ===
- CONCACAF (2027–2029)
  - CONCACAF Gold Cup
  - CONCACAF Nations League final

=== United States ===
- NFL on Netflix (2024–present)
  - Annual Christmas Day game(s)
  - Week 1 game
  - Week 12/13 "Thanksgiving Eve" game
  - Week 18 game
  - NFL Honors (beginning 2027)
- MLB on Netflix (2026–present)
  - Primetime "Opening Night" game
  - Home Run Derby
  - Annual regular season neutral-site game (such as MLB at Field of Dreams)
- FIFA (2027–2031)
  - 2027 FIFA Women's World Cup
  - 2031 FIFA Women's World Cup

== See also ==
- Sports on Prime Video
