= 2027 Major League Baseball season =

Professional baseball season in the United States and Canada

2027 MLB season
- League: Major League Baseball
- Sport: Baseball
- Duration: March 24 – September 26, 2027 (Note: Pending the signing of a new collective bargaining agreement)
- Games: 162
- Teams: 30
- TV partner(s): Fox/FS1; TBS/TruTV; NBC/NBCSN; ESPN/ABC; MLB Network
- Streaming partner(s): Fox One; HBO Max; Peacock; ESPN app Apple TV; Netflix

Draft

Regular season

Postseason

World Series

MLB seasons
- ← 2026 2028 →

The 2027 Major League Baseball season is contingent on Major League Baseball (MLB) and the Major League Baseball Players Association (MLBPA) signing a new collective bargaining agreement (CBA) to replace the one that expires on December 1, 2026. Without a new CBA, MLB is expected to lock out the players on December 2 until one is signed. The major labor issue under dispute is the MLB's proposal to implement a salary cap during the 2028 season at the earliest, which the player's union opposes.

If the season starts as originally scheduled, it would begin on March 24 and end on September 26. The postseason would then start on September 28, with the World Series running from October 22 to a possible Game 7 on October 30. The 97th All-Star Game is scheduled for July 13 at Wrigley Field in Chicago, Illinois, the home of the Chicago Cubs. However, if a lockout extends indefinitely, the season could be postponed, shortened, or even cancelled.

== Collective bargaining agreement ==
The 2022 collective bargaining agreement (CBA) between the league and the players' union is set to expire on December 1, 2026. If there is no new CBA after that date, MLB owners are expected to enact a lockout of the players as early as December 2, which would be the first MLB work stoppage since the 2021–22 lockout. If such a lockout extends into late February or early March, MLB would then consider whether to postpone or shorten the 2027 season. If a labor dispute extends further into 2027, there is the possibility of the entire season being cancelled, which would be the first time in North America a full season was lost since the 2004–05 NHL season.

The major issue under dispute is MLB owners proposing to implement a salary cap. MLB is the only one out of the major professional sports leagues in the United States and Canada to not have a salary cap. This is the first time that MLB owners have proposed a salary cap since 1994, which led to the 1994–95 Major League Baseball strike. MLB commissioner Rob Manfred stated that a salary cap will lessen the payroll disparity between the teams, which has grown to more than $400 million between the highest payroll team and the lowest payroll team. While the highest payroll teams would have to reduce their spending and may need to cut players, a salary floor would also be implemented to force the lowest payroll team to increase their spending on players.

Like in 1994–95, the players oppose a salary cap since it would result in an overall pay cut. The players' union has instead proposed, among others, increases in minimum salaries, increases in revenue sharing among the teams, and a "competitive integrity tax" charged to those clubs that do not meet a minimum payroll amount. The players union also highlights the fact that low-payroll teams like the Milwaukee Brewers and the Tampa Bay Rays have been competitive in the playoffs in recent years, with both teams playing in the previous World Series (which was dubbed a "Small Market World Series").

Owners have also proposed to shorten the regular season to 154 games by 2029 by introducing a weekly off day. While most teams would take a break on each Monday, there would be one or two national Monday Night Baseball games. Those teams that play on Monday would then be off on Thursday. The owners also proposed to expand the Division Series to a best-of-seven format. And the higher playoff seed would be able to pick their opponent during the first two postseason rounds. The players' union responded that any new proposals would still be contingent on resolving the salary cap dispute.

In May 2026, the owners proposed a hard cap of $245.3 million and a hard floor of $171.2 million, with a 50/50 revenue split. after deductions. The owners then revised their proposal in November 2026, suggesting to delay implementing the salary cap until the 2028 season so there would be more time for teams to make the transition, with the hard cap increased to $258.2 million and the salary floor to $180.2 million. The players' union replied that it still opposes any form of a salary cap.

== Schedule ==
Major League Baseball released its 2027 schedule on July 16, 2026. Pending the signing of a new CBA, each team would play 162 regular-season games. The regular season is scheduled to start on March 24, with a standalone night game featuring opponents to be announced at a later date. The slate of Opening Day games is then planned for March 25, the earliest that it has been scheduled in MLB history. No international games were scheduled this season due to the possible lockout.

The 97th All-Star Game is scheduled for July 13 at Wrigley Field in Chicago, Illinois, the home of the Chicago Cubs.

The second half of the season is scheduled to begin on July 15 with a standalone game, leading to this season's "Rivalry Weekend" running through July 18, with 11 series featuring prime "interleague" rivals. This season's MLB at Field of Dreams game is planned for August 12, with the Kansas City Royals hosting the Boston Red Sox. The MLB Little League Classic game is planned for August 19 and will see the Toronto Blue Jays hosting the Chicago Cubs. The regular season is then scheduled to end on September 26.

== Managerial changes ==
=== General managers ===
==== Off-season ====
Team	Former GM	Interim GM	Reason for leaving	New GM	Notes
Athletics	David Forst	Dan Feinstein	Fired	TBA	On August 7, 2026, Forst and the A's parted ways after 11 seasons as general manager and three straight playoff appearances from 2018–2020. Assistant GM Dan Feinstein was named interim for the rest of the season.
Houston Astros	Dana Brown	N/A	Fired	Randy Flores	On August 24, 2026, Dana Brown and the Astros parted ways after four years as general manager and two playoff appearances. On October 31, 2026, Randy Flores was named the new general manager. This will be his first major executive role. He was previously the assistant general manager for the St. Louis Cardinals until his hiring.
Los Angeles Angels	Perry Minasian	John Mozeliak	Fired	TBA	On June 26, 2026, Perry Minasian was fired after six years as general manager with no playoff appearances. Mozeliak, who spent 30 years in the Cardinals organization, was named interim general manager of the team for the rest of the season. On October 21, 2026, it was announced that John Mozeliak would not return to the team for the 2027 season.

=== Field managers ===
==== Off-season ====
Team	Former manager	Interim manager	Reason for leaving	New manager	Notes
Philadelphia Phillies	Rob Thomson	Don Mattingly	Fired	Don Mattingly	On April 28, 2026, after a 9–19 (.321) start to the season, the Phillies fired Rob Thomson. Thomson finished his Phillies career with a 355–270 (.568) record and four playoff appearance, including an appearance in the 2022 World Series. Don Mattingly was named as the interim manager for the remainder of the season. This was his third managerial position, having served as manager for the Los Angeles Dodgers (2011–2015) and Miami Marlins (2016–2022), where he compiled a record of 889–950 (.483). On October 14, 2026, the Phillies made Mattingly their permanent manager, signing a two year contract through 2028.
Seattle Mariners	Dan Wilson	N/A	Fired	Jason Kanzler	On September 27, 2026, after a 76–86 (.469) 2026 season, the Mariners announced that Dan Wilson would not be returning to manage the team in 2027. Wilson finished his Mariners career with a 187–171 (.522) record and one postseason appearance, including an AL West title in 2025. On November 3, 2026, Kanzler was hired as their new manager. This will be his first managerial position.
Houston Astros	Joe Espada	N/A	Contract not renewed	TBA	On October 14, 2026, the Astros announced that Joe Espada would not be returning to manage the team in 2027. Espada finished his Astros career with a 256–229 (.528) record and two postseason appearances.
Los Angeles Angels	Kurt Suzuki	N/A	Contract not renewed	TBA	On October 21, 2026, the Angels announced that Kurt Suzuki would not be returning to manage team in 2027. Suzuki finished his Angels career with a 62–100 (.383) record.

== Venues ==
This is expected to be the Athletics's third and final season at Sutter Health Park in West Sacramento, California, before they relocate to their new ballpark on the Las Vegas Strip in Paradise, Nevada. Similar to their 2026 season, the Athletics are scheduled to play their May 31–June 5 homestand at Las Vegas Ballpark in Summerlin South, Nevada, the home of their Pacific Coast League affiliate, the Las Vegas Aviators.

On September 21, 2026, it was announced that the Detroit Tigers' Comerica Park would be renamed Fifth Third Park after Comerica Bank was acquired by Fifth Third Bank in February 2026.

== Uniforms ==
=== Wholesale changes ===
- The Orioles brought back the all-black "ornithologically correct" bird cap from 2009 to 2011 as an alternate cap. Additionally, the trim striping on their core uniforms moved to the edge of the sleeve, while the Maryland flag patch was updated with a thick black roundel and outer orange trim.

== Media ==
=== Television ===
==== National ====
This would be the second season of the existing three-year deals with ESPN, NBC Sports, and Netflix; and the sixth year of the existing seven-year deals with Fox Sports, TNT Sports, and Apple TV. All these agreements have clauses in their contracts that would extend the deals for an extra season if at least 60 games per team are lost and not rescheduled due to a lockout.

===== Linear television =====
- ESPN has the rights to exclusively broadcast up to 30 games mostly during the summer months, including Memorial Day games, second-half opener games, and the MLB Little League Classic. ESPN also has the option to air selected games on ABC.
- Fox has the rights to air regional Saturday night Baseball Night in America games throughout the regular season, as well as the All-Star Game. FS1 would also have additional games on selected days (including Saturday afternoons).
- Starting this season, NBC Sports will have the rights to air one of the annual special event games, with this year being the MLB at Field of Dreams game, and a contest during the final day of the regular season. NBC would also continue to air Sunday Night Baseball and MLB Sunday Leadoff. Most Sunday Night Baseball games will air on the NBC broadcast network, although it will instead be exclusively on Peacock during the early and late portions of the season due to conflicts with Sunday Night Basketball and Sunday Night Football. MLB Sunday Leadoff games may also be split between NBC and Peacock. NBC would also have Opening Day games, the All-Star Futures Game, and a primetime Labor Day game. NBCSN would continue to simulcast Peacock's exclusive telecasts.
- TBS holds the rights to MLB Tuesday games every Tuesday night throughout the regular season, with the first-half schedule announced before the season, and the second-half schedule to be announced at a later date. Most games are blacked out in the home markets of the teams playing; however, TBS is allowed to co-exist once with a team's local broadcast.
- MLB Network would continue to broadcast a regular slate of games when the other national broadcasters are not airing games. While most games will be simulcasts of the teams' local broadcast, select games are produced by the network under its MLB Network Showcase banner. All games are blacked out in the home markets of the teams playing.
- In Spanish, UniMás and TUDN would air the weekly whiparound show MLB En Vivo (lit. 'MLB Live') on Tuesday nights throughout the season, the weekly studio show MLB Esta Semana (lit. 'MLB This Week') on Saturday nights, in addition to postseason coverage.

===== Streaming =====
- Apple TV has the rights to Friday Night Baseball games throughout the season.
- Peacock simulcasts all national NBC Sports games. The service also has the rights have for select exclusive MLB Sunday Leadoff games, and exclusive Sunday Night Baseball during the early portion of the season due to NBA coverage; and during the later portion of the season due to Sunday Night Football. Peacock-exclusive games may also simulcast on NBCSN. Peacock also has supplemental programming scheduled, including a whiparound show after every Sunday Leadoff and on the final day of the regular season.
- The ESPN Unlimited, Fox One, and HBO Max's ad-free tiers simulcasts national games shown on ESPN networks (including ABC), Fox Sports (excluding out-of-market Fox games), and TBS respectively.
- ESPN Unlimited and Peacock has the rights to feature a non-exclusive "game of the day", blacked out in local markets.
- Netflix has the rights for an Opening Night game on the evening prior to the traditional slate of Opening Day games, the Home Run Derby, and an annual special event game.
- MLB+ has the rights to stream a live stream of MLB Network and air the MLB Big Inning whiparound show.
- MLB.tv has the rights to stream everything on MLB+, along with all out-of-market non-nationally televised games (including out-of-market regional Fox games). New subscribers to MLB.tv would have to subscribe through the ESPN app.

===== Postseason =====
NBC Sports (NBC and NBCSN, with Spanish–language simulcasts on Universo) holds the rights to air all four Wild Card Series. TNT Sports (TBS and truTV, with Spanish-language simulcasts on TUDN) holds the National League Division Series and the National League Championship Series, and Fox Sports (Fox and FS1, with Spanish-language simulcasts on Fox Deportes) has the American League Division Series, the American League Championship Series and the World Series.

==== Local ====
It is expected that MLB Local Media's in-market feeds will be fully integrated into the ESPN app by the start of this season instead of only being able to access them directly through MLB's platforms.

==== International ====
- ESPN has the rights to air its games in Latin America, the Caribbean, Australia and New Zealand, Africa, the Netherlands, and China.
- Sky Sports has the rights to air NBC Sports's games in Ireland and the United Kingdom.

=== Radio ===
==== National ====
- This would be ESPN Radio's second season of the existing three-year deal for national broadcasts, including Sunday Night Baseball, the All-Star Game, and postseason games.
- This would be the fourth season of the league's five-year deal with SiriusXM and SiriusXM Canada to simulcast all 30 teams' local regular season and postseason broadcasts.
