= NFL on Netflix =

- Also known as: NFL GameDay; NFL Christmas GameDay
- Genre: American football game telecasts
- Presented by: Various commentators
- Country of origin: United States
- Original language: English
- No. of seasons: 3 (through 2026 season)

Production
- Production locations: Various NFL stadiums (game telecasts and playoff pre-game/post-game shows); NFL West, Inglewood, California (pre-game, halftime and post-game shows)
- Camera setup: Multi-camera
- Running time: 210 minutes or until game ends (inc. adverts)
- Production companies: National Football League; EverWonder Studio; CBS Sports (2024–2025); NBC Sports (2026–present)

Original release
- Network: Netflix
- Release: December 25, 2024 – present

Related
- NFL on CBS; NFL on NBC

The American subscription streaming service Netflix began to broadcast National Football League (NFL) games beginning in the 2024 season; the service has generally focused on isolated rights to standalone regular season games promoted as events.

Initially under a three-year deal beginning in 2024, the service has broadcast a Christmas Day doubleheader, billed as NFL Christmas Gameday; the games have featured entertainment-oriented components, including appearances by personalities from Netflix original programming as celebrity correspondents during their pregame shows, and the second game featuring a halftime show headlined by a major recording artist. Until 2026, the games were primarily produced by CBS Sports using personnel from the NFL on CBS, with NFL Media producing surrounding coverage from its studios in Inglewood, and EverWonder Studio coordinating the presentation for Netflix.

In May 2026, Netflix renewed its rights to the NFL through 2029; beginning in the 2026 season, the service will add three additional games per-season, including a Week 1 game, a Wednesday-night game prior to Thanksgiving, and a Week 18 Saturday game, in addition to at least one Christmas Day game per-year from 2027 onward; at this time NBC Sports also took over production of the game broadcasts to replace CBS. It will also become the exclusive broadcaster of the NFL Honors.

As per NFL rules for nationally televised games not on free-to-air television, the telecasts are simulcast by television stations in the home markets of the participating teams.

== History ==
Netflix began to selectively pursue rights to professional sports events in 2024, albeit focusing primarily on isolated rights to one-off special events (such as combat sports cards) as opposed to season-length packages.

In March 2024, after having increasingly scheduled Christmas Day games for the past few seasons, the NFL announced a three-year deal with Netflix to broadcast national Christmas Day games, with 2024 featuring a doubleheader, and at least one game each in 2025 and 2026. For the 2024 season, the NFL scheduled the Kansas City Chiefs at the Pittsburgh Steelers, and the Baltimore Ravens at the Houston Texans. On November 18, 2024, it was announced that Beyoncé would perform a halftime show during the Ravens–Texans game. Mariah Carey also performed "All I Want for Christmas Is You" for a pre-recorded segment during the pre-game show.

For 2025, Netflix carried the Dallas Cowboys at the Washington Commanders, and the Detroit Lions at the Minnesota Vikings. The Lions–Vikings game featured a halftime show headlined by Snoop Dogg, with special guests Lainey Wilson, Andrea and Matteo Bocelli, and Ejae, Audrey Nuna, and Rei Ami from the Netflix film KPop Demon Hunters.

In April 2026, Netflix co-CEO Ted Sarandos remarked that the company was interested in expanding its NFL coverage, as it was "great property" that "delivers value as part of our total offering." The company, alongside YouTube, had been considered potential frontrunners for a new five-game package the NFL was offering for the 2026 season.

On May 13, 2026, Netflix announced a renewal to its contract through the 2029 season that adds games outside of Christmas for the first time; these will include a Week 1 game, a Wednesday-night "Thanksgiving Eve" game, and a Week 18 game. For 2026, Netflix will broadcast the Week 1 NFL International Series game in Melbourne, Australia between the Los Angeles Rams and San Francisco 49ers on September 11, 2026, a Wednesday-night game between the Green Bay Packers and the Los Angeles Rams on November 25, its Christmas games (Green Bay Packers at Chicago Bears, and Buffalo Bills at Denver Broncos), and a Week 18 matchup held (to be determined) on Saturday January 9, 2027. Beginning in 2027, Netflix will air at least one Christmas Day game per-season, and become the exclusive broadcaster of the NFL Honors—the league's annual awards presentation during Super Bowl week.

== Production ==
For its first two seasons, the broadcasts were co-produced by EverWonder Studio (which has been involved in other Netflix sporting events), with NFL Media producing studio programming for the games from the NFL's west coast headquarters in Inglewood, and CBS Sports was subcontracted to produce the game broadcasts using NFL on CBS personnel. It also worked alongside 2Fresh, Girraphic, and a Netflix creative team on a custom graphics package.

CBS Sports' CEO David Berson noted that the division had been subcontracted to produce event broadcasts for other networks in this manner before due to their experience, and that "we have great relationships with both [the NFL and Netflix]. The fact that we were able to work something out with them and truly have a win-win-win deal is great." As part of this arrangement, the over-the-air simulcasts of the Netflix games in the teams' home markets—as required by NFL rules—would air on CBS affiliates (with Berson noting that the 2024 games would air on two CBS-owned stations in Baltimore and Pittsburgh).

Netflix VP of Production, Nonfiction & Live Jonathan Mussman stated that the 2024 games were "the first time a single day of regular season games has been offered to a single broadcaster globally", and that it planned to "[provide] enhanced football coverage using toolsets typically reserved for the largest games". With resources from NEP Group, Netflix would broadcast the 2024 doubleheader with 16 alternate language feeds.

Coverage underwent changes for 2026, with NBC Sports replacing CBS as the producer, as well the introduction of a new on-air graphics package—originally introduced as part of Netflix's Major League Baseball coverage—that will serve as the basis of its on-air presentation for future sports properties.

== Personnel ==
Netflix's games initially featured a mix of CBS and NFL Network personnel, along with selected personalities from other NFL broadcasters. In 2024, Ian Eagle served as play-by-play commentator for the Chiefs–Steelers game, joined by Nate Burleson and J. J. Watt as analysts, and sideline reporters Melanie Collins and NFL Network personality Stacey Dales. Ian's son Noah Eagle called the Ravens–Texans game, paired with Fox's Greg Olsen, and sideline reporters Jamie Erdahl and Steve Wyche of NFL Network. Former NFL Network anchor Kay Adams led the studio panel, joined by Drew Brees, Robert Griffin III, Mina Kimes, and Manti Teʻo. Comedians Bert Kreischer and Nate Bargatze served as celebrity correspondents.

Ian and Noah Eagle remained the play-by-play commentators for the Christmas Day doubleheader in 2025, but with J. J. Watt replaced by Matt Ryan, and Olsen replaced by Drew Brees. Adams was joined on the studio panel by Austin Ekeler, Michael Irvin, and Devin McCourty, while Bert Kreischer and Tom Segura served as celebrity guest correspondents. For the second game, Jamie Erdahl led studio coverage from Minneapolis, joined by Te'o and Brandon Marshall, with WWE wrestler Seth Rollins as a celebrity correspondent. The changes were reportedly prompted by ESPN and Fox becoming reluctant to release their commentators to Netflix for the broadcasts.

With its larger package of games for 2026, former ESPN personality Elle Duncan—who was hired in December 2025 to serve as a host for sports and other live events on Netflix—stated that Netflix was aiming to have a consistent on-air staff for its NFL coverage moving forward. Former ESPN reporter Tom Pelissero was hired in August 2026 to serve as a sideline reporter and insider. For the Melbourne game, Noah Eagle served as play-by-play announcer, with Luke Kuechly as analyst and MJ Acosta-Ruiz as sideline reporter. Duncan was joined as studio host by Michael Irvin, Nick Foles, and Clay Matthews III.

== Viewership ==
The 2024 doubleheader was seen by an average of 24.1 and 24.3 million viewers respectively, peaking at 27 million viewers during the halftime show of the latter. Variety considered these numbers to be "more than respectable numbers for Netflix’s first outing and on the high end of what CBS, Fox, NBC or ESPN might garner with a highly anticipated NFL or college football game." The 2025 doubleheader was seen by an average of 19.9 million and 27.5 million viewers respectively; the latter Lions–Vikings game (which saw the Vikings defeat the Lions in an upset that eliminated the team from playoff contention) set a new record for the highest-rated streaming-exclusive telecast in NFL history, and peaked at 30 million viewers.

== Game results ==
=== 2024 season ===
Week	Date	Visiting team		Home team		Stadium	Game MVPs	Simulcast	Game notes
17	December 25	Kansas City Chiefs	29	Pittsburgh Steelers	10	Acrisure Stadium	Patrick Mahomes and Travis Kelce	KCTV (Kansas City); KDKA-TV (Pittsburgh)	First NFL game on Netflix
17	December 25	Baltimore Ravens	31	Houston Texans	2	NRG Stadium	Lamar Jackson and Derrick Henry	WJZ-TV (Baltimore); KHOU (Houston)	2023 AFC Divisional rematch

=== 2025 season ===
Week	Date	Visiting team		Home team		Stadium	Game MVPs	Simulcast	Game notes
17	December 25	Dallas Cowboys	30	Washington Commanders	23	Northwest Stadium	Dak Prescott and KaVontae Turpin	KTVT (Dallas); WUSA-TV (Washington D.C.)	Rivalry
17	December 25	Detroit Lions	10	Minnesota Vikings	23	U.S. Bank Stadium	Andrew Van Ginkel and Byron Murphy	WWJ-TV (Detroit); WCCO-TV (Minnesota)	Rivalry

=== 2026 season ===
Week	Date	Visiting team		Home team		Stadium	Game MVPs	Simulcast	Game notes
1	September 11 (Note: September 10 in U.S. time zones)	San Francisco 49ers	27	Los Angeles Rams	7	Melbourne Cricket Ground (Melbourne)	Brock Purdy, Nick Bosa, and Fred Warner	KNTV (San Francisco); KNBC (Los Angeles)	NFL International Series; first NFL game in Australia; rivalry
12	November 25	Green Bay Packers		Los Angeles Rams		SoFi Stadium		WGBA-TV (Green Bay); WTMJ-TV (Milwaukee); KNBC (Los Angeles)	First NFL game on the Wednesday before Thanksgiving
16	December 25	Green Bay Packers		Chicago Bears		Soldier Field		WGBA-TV (Green Bay); WTMJ-TV (Milwaukee); WMAQ-TV (Chicago)	Rivalry
16	December 25	Buffalo Bills		Denver Broncos		Empower Field at Mile High		TBD (Buffalo); TBD (Denver)	2025 AFC Divisional rematch
18	January 9, 2027	TBD		TBD		TBD		TBD	

== International broadcasts ==
In Canada, Netflix's Christmas Day games have been aired by TSN and the broadcast CTV network as part of Bell Media's Canadian rights to the NFL.

== See also ==
- NFL on Prime Video
- NFL on NBC
