= Flexible scheduling =

Flexible scheduling or flex scheduling may refer to:

- Modular scheduling in American schools
- Flexible scheduling (sports)
- Flextime, a flexible hours schedule in a workday
