= Elle Duncan =

American sports broadcaster (born 1983)

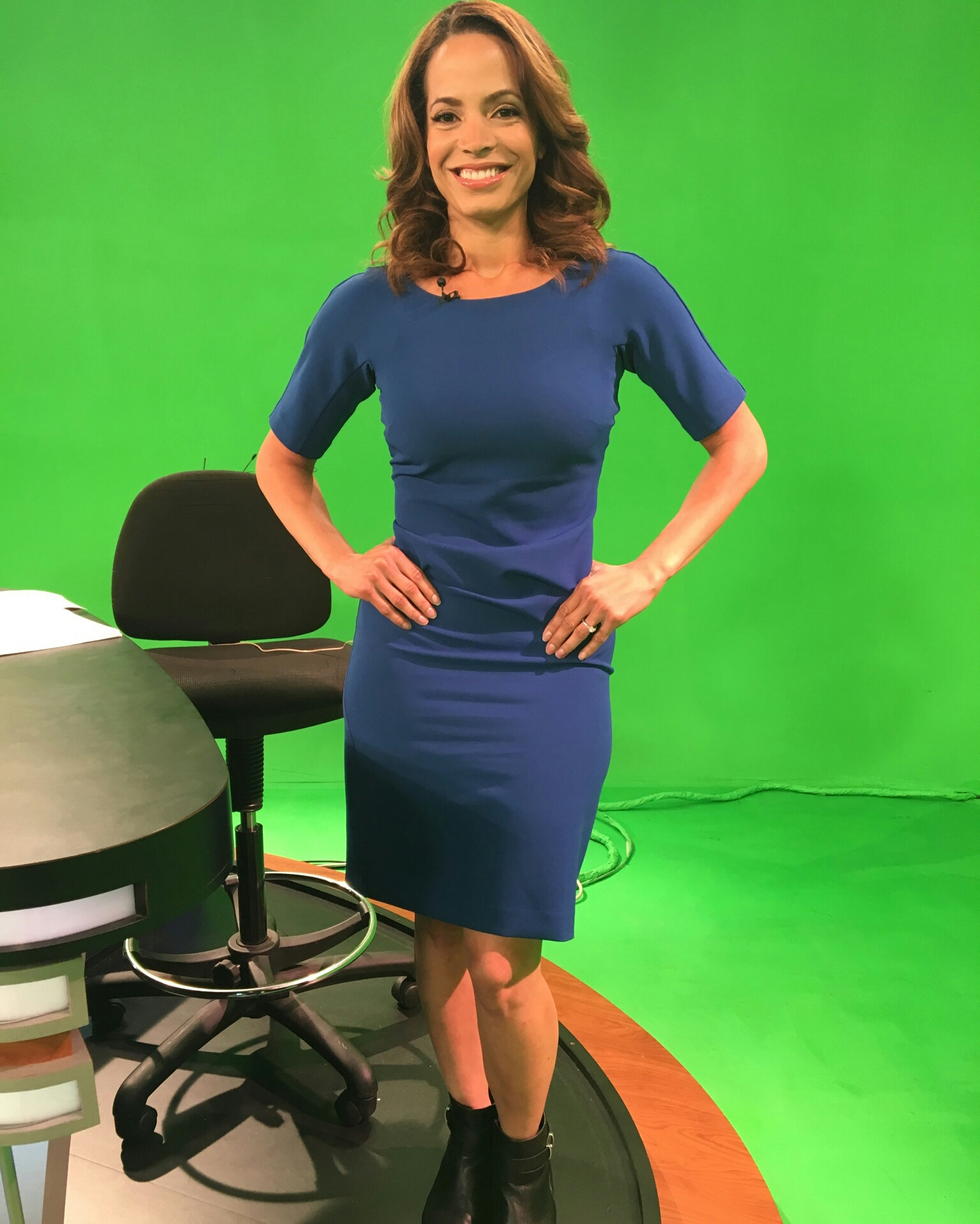
- Duncan at NESN on April 7, 2016
- Born: Lauren Duncan; April 12, 1983 (age 43); Atlanta, Georgia, U.S.
- Occupations: Anchor, reporter, television personality
- Years active: 2003–present
- Notable credits: Atlanta Hawks 2005–2013; NESN 2014–2016; ESPN 2016–2025; Netflix 2025–present; USA Sports 2026–present

Lauren "Elle" Duncan (born April 12, 1983) is an American sports anchor who works for Netflix and USA Sports. She is noted for her tenure with ESPN as an anchor for the sports news program SportsCenter and women's basketball from 2016 to 2025.

== Early life and education ==
Duncan's father worked at AT&T, while her mother worked for an education service which provided resources to school age children. Duncan attended the University of West Georgia.

== Career ==
=== Atlanta ===
Duncan began her career in Atlanta as an intern with an American syndicated sports talk radio show on 790/The Zone, 2 Live Stews. After a year, she was hired to join the radio station, V-103. While working there, her roles included being a traffic reporter, and an on-air personality. In 2009, Duncan hosted an afternoon show at the station. Duncan also contributed sideline reporting for Atlanta Hawks basketball games, SEC and ACC football games. Duncan also worked as a traffic reporter at WXIA-TV in 2012.

=== Boston ===
Duncan joined NESN in 2014 as an anchor, reporter, and host. Duncan began co-hosting NESN Live Presented by Cross Insurance with Sarah Davis. The show features updates from NESN reporters and game-day analysis from Fenway Park, TD Garden, and Gillette Stadium. While at NESN, Duncan has also worked as a sideline reporter for the Boston Red Sox and hosted coverage of Super Bowl XLIX between the New England Patriots and Seattle Seahawks from Glendale, Arizona.

=== ESPN ===
Duncan joined SportsCenter as an anchor on April 27, 2016. She hosted the weekday 6pm ET edition of SportsCenter with Kevin Negandhi. While at ESPN Duncan also hosted a YouTube show for the network, The Elle Duncan Show, where she would discuss sports and pop culture topics with her co-host Gary Striewski. Duncan was also noted for strengthening the coverage of Women's basketball both in the collegiate and professional setting while at ESPN. She hosted women's basketball for College GameDay Women's Basketball. She also hosted WNBA Countdown. Duncan, along with Chiney Ogwumike and Andraya Carter were known as the Big 3 for their in depth analysis of the WNBA, and strong audience growth during their coverage on WNBA Countdown.

Duncan made her final appearance on ESPN on December 17, 2025.

=== Netflix and USA Sports ===
On December 18, 2025, Netflix announced that they had hired Duncan to serve as the lead studio host for its sports coverage, along with other live events being streamed by the platform. She made her Netflix debut as host of Skyscraper Live on January 25, 2026, and then became the studio host for Netflix's MLB and NFL coverage later in the year. Duncan explained that she departed ESPN because of her limited on-air roles at the network, and noted that Netflix provided her opportunities to branch out into non-sports and "sports-adjacent" live events (such as Skyscraper Live) as well.

As part of the contract, Duncan is also free to sign with other networks for roles that do not conflict with her commitments to Netflix. In January 2026, Duncan was signed by USA Sports to serve as studio host for its WNBA coverage.

== Personal life ==
On April 28, 2013, Duncan was arrested for DUI and reckless driving.

Duncan has been involved with Walker, a non-profit leader in special education, behavioral health and residential treatment for children and youth. Duncan also launched a Cause & Effect series that raised funds for underexposed nonprofit organizations.

In 2014, Duncan had a cameo role as a sports reporter in the Kevin Hart comedy Ride Along.

Duncan has been married to Omar Abdul Ali since 2016. The couple welcomed their daughter, Eva, in 2018, and their son, Xander, in 2020.

== Accolades ==
- Top 25 Women in Atlanta – The Steed Society
- 2011 Inspiring Women Award – Atlanta Dream
- 2 Sports Emmy Awards, as part of SportsCenter's wins for Outstanding Studio Show, Daily
