= Major League Baseball on Netflix =

- Genre: American baseball game telecasts
- Directed by: Tom Healy (pre/postgame studio show director); John Moore (game director)
- Presented by: Matt Vasgersian; Hunter Pence; CC Sabathia; Lauren Shehadi; Elle Duncan; Barry Bonds; Albert Pujols; Anthony Rizzo
- Country of origin: United States
- Original language: English
- No. of seasons: 1 (through 2026 season)

Production
- Producers: Chris Collins (pre/postgame studio show producer); Mike Treanor (game producer)
- Production locations: Various MLB stadiums (game telecasts)
- Camera setup: Multi-camera
- Running time: 210 minutes or until game ends (inc. adverts)
- Production companies: MLB Network or NBC Sports; EverWonder Studio

Original release
- Network: Netflix
- Release: March 25, 2026 – present

Major League Baseball on Netflix (also known as MLB on Netflix) is an American presentation of Major League Baseball (MLB) broadcast by Netflix.

The package debuted in the 2026 season as part of a renegotiation of ESPN's rights to the league, and consists primarily of two standalone regular season games (including the primetime "Opening Night" game, and a special event game such as MLB at Field of Dreams), and coverage of the Home Run Derby prior to the All-Star Game. The coverage is overseen by EverWonder Studio, with production duties for the game broadcasts subcontracted by either MLB Network or NBC Sports staff.

== History ==
In February 2025, ESPN and Major League Baseball announced that both parties had exercised a mutual opt-out to end their media agreement following the previous 2025 season; the contract was originally going to expire after the 2028 season.

In November 2025, MLB reached new, three-year agreements with ESPN, NBC Sports, and Netflix to replace ESPN's previous deal. In line with the company's preference towards isolated rights that can be promoted as an "event", Netflix's package includes rights to the primetime "Opening Night" game, the Home Run Derby, and an annual special event game (such as the neutral-site MLB at Field of Dreams game). The deal overall is reportedly worth $50 million annually.

== Production ==
Similarly to Netflix's NFL coverage, production is overseen by EverWonder Studio. For the opening night game, the broadcast was produced by MLB Network and featured 30 different cameras (including augmented reality cameras, and one on a kayak in McCovey Cove—one of 73 present placed in honor of Barry Bonds' single-season home run record in 2001). For the Field of Dreams game in 2026, Netflix began partnering with NBC Sports to produce the broadcasts and its NFL coverage.

== Commentators ==
Date	Teams	Play-by-play	Color commentator(s)	Reporter(s)	Studio host	Studio analyst(s)	Contributor(s)
March 25, 2026	New York Yankees-San Francisco Giants (Opening Night)	Matt Vasgersian	Hunter Pence (co-primary); CC Sabathia (co-primary)	Lauren Shehadi	Elle Duncan	Barry Bonds, Albert Pujols, and Anthony Rizzo	Bert Kreischer, Jey and Jimmy Uso, and Jameis Winston
August 13, 2026	Philadelphia Phillies-Minnesota Twins (MLB at Field of Dreams)	Matt Vasgersian	Hunter Pence; CC Sabathia	Lauren Shehadi	Elle Duncan	Barry Bonds, Albert Pujols, and Anthony Rizzo	

== Reception ==
The inaugural Opening Night game between the New York Yankees and San Francisco Giants was seen by approximately 3 million viewers, an 45% increase over the Opening Night game on ESPN in 2025.

Netflix faced mixed reviews from viewers and critics for aspects of the Opening Night broadcast, such as an excessive amount of entertainment elements and cross-promotion for Netflix original programming (including guest appearances by Daniel Dae Kim, Yahya Abdul-Mateen II, and WWE wrestlers John Cena and Jey Uso to promote Avatar: The Last Airbender, Man on Fire, Little Brother, and Monday Night Raw respectively), a studio panel of MLB alumni with unproven broadcasting experience (with Barry Bonds receiving positive reviews, but Andrew Marchand of The Athletic noting that the extended pre-game show felt like an episode of This is Your Life about Bonds), missing the first regular season use of ABS challenges due to an in-game interview with the Giants' manager Tony Vitello, and using an unusually-designed scoreboard graphic (which would subsequently be replaced with a revised design for the Field of Dreams game.

Netflix's inaugural Home Run Derby broadcast drew 5.3 million viewers, which was the lowest-rated edition of the event since 2003 (while the event was still on ESPN), but with an increased amount of viewership among younger demographics.

== See also ==
- Sports on Netflix
- List of Netflix original programming
