= 2026 Major League Baseball season =

Professional baseball season in the United States and Canada

2026 MLB season
- League: Major League Baseball
- Sport: Baseball
- Duration: March 25 – October 28
- Games: 162
- Teams: 30
- TV partner(s): Fox/FS1; TBS/TruTV; NBC/NBCSN; ESPN/ABC; MLB Network
- Streaming partner(s): Fox One; HBO Max; Peacock; ESPN app Apple TV; Netflix

Draft
- Top draft pick: Roch Cholowsky
- Picked by: Chicago White Sox

Regular season
- Season MVP: AL: Yordan Alvarez (HOU); NL: Pete Crow-Armstrong (CHC)

Postseason
- AL champions: Tampa Bay Rays
- AL runners-up: Cleveland Guardians
- NL champions: Milwaukee Brewers
- NL runners-up: Los Angeles Dodgers

World Series
- Champions: Milwaukee Brewers
- Runners-up: Tampa Bay Rays
- World Series MVP: William Contreras (MIL)

MLB seasons
- ← 2025 2027 →

Locations of AL teams for the 2026–present MLB seasons
West Central East
Locations of NL teams for the 2017–present MLB seasons
West Central East

The 2026 Major League Baseball season began on March 25 with a single night game featuring the San Francisco Giants hosting the New York Yankees and ended on September 27. The postseason began on September 29. The World Series began on October 23 and ended on October 28 with the Milwaukee Brewers defeating the Tampa Bay Rays in five games. The 96th All-Star Game was played on July 14 at Citizens Bank Park in Philadelphia, Pennsylvania, the home of the Philadelphia Phillies.

Only two teams failed to complete the entire 162-game regular season schedule, as the game between the Baltimore Orioles and the New York Yankees at Yankee Stadium on September 27 was canceled due to rain and never made up, owing to scheduling constraints and the game being inconsequential to the playoffs.

== Schedule ==
Major League Baseball released its 2026 schedule on August 26, 2025. Each team will play 162 regular-season games. As has been the case since 2025, each team was scheduled to play 13 games against their division rivals, totaling 52 games. Each team would play six games against eight opponents and seven games against two opponents in the same league for a total of 62 games. Each team would also play 48 interleague games, including a six-game home-and-home series against their designated interleague rival.

The regular season started on March 25, with a standalone night game featuring the San Francisco Giants hosting the New York Yankees. The slate of Opening Day games then took place on March 26, the earliest that it has been scheduled in MLB history. This season's "Rivalry Weekend" is planned on May 15–17, again 11 series featuring prime "interleague" rivals and the matches reversed from the previous year.

The MLB Mexico City Series returned when the Arizona Diamondbacks and the San Diego Padres played a two-game series at Alfredo Harp Helú Stadium in Mexico City on April 25–26. The scheduled return of the London Series was cancelled due to scheduling conflicts at London Stadium and Fox's availability due to the 2026 FIFA World Cup. The World Cup also affected schedules of the Kansas City Royals, Philadelphia Phillies, Seattle Mariners, and Texas Rangers, whose home stadiums are located near World Cup venues.

The 96th All-Star Game was played on July 14 at Citizens Bank Park in Philadelphia, Pennsylvania, the home of the Philadelphia Phillies. The game was part of the celebration of the 250th anniversary of the signing of the United States Declaration of Independence.

The MLB at Field of Dreams game returned on August 13 after a three-season absence, with the Minnesota Twins hosting the Philadelphia Phillies. The MLB Little League Classic at Bowman Field in Williamsport, Pennsylvania, was played on August 23 between the Atlanta Braves and the Milwaukee Brewers.

A Subway Series matchup between the New York Mets and the New York Yankees was played at Yankee Stadium on September 11–13 to mark the 25th anniversary of the September 11 attacks. The two teams squared off at Citi Field for the 20th anniversary.

== Rule changes ==
On September 23, 2025, MLB's competition committee approved use of the Automated Ball-Strike System (ABS) beginning with the 2026 season. Batters, pitchers, and catchers are allowed to request challenges by tapping on their helmet or cap. Each team starts with two challenges, retains a challenge if it is successful, and receives additional challenges in extra innings, if the team is out of challenges during regulation. The New York Mets were the first team to successfully challenge a pitching call via the ABS system.

== Franchise values ==
The New York Yankees and Los Angeles Dodgers were projected to be the two highest-value MLB teams in March 2026, worth approximately $17 billion in total. The Miami Marlins were projected to be the lowest-value MLB team in March 2026, worth only $1.4 billion.

== Standings ==
=== American League ===
AL East
Team	W	L	Pct.	GB	Home	Road
^{(1)} Tampa Bay Rays	98	64	.605	—	55‍–‍26	43‍–‍38
^{(4)} New York Yankees	93	68	.578	4½	46‍–‍34	47‍–‍34
^{(5)} Boston Red Sox	87	75	.537	11	41‍–‍40	46‍–‍35
Baltimore Orioles	79	82	.491	18½	39‍–‍42	40‍–‍40
Toronto Blue Jays	79	83	.488	19	42‍–‍39	37‍–‍44

AL Central
Team	W	L	Pct.	GB	Home	Road
^{(2)} Cleveland Guardians	85	77	.525	—	41‍–‍40	44‍–‍37
^{(6)} Chicago White Sox	84	78	.519	1	48‍–‍33	36‍–‍45
Minnesota Twins	77	85	.475	8	42‍–‍39	35‍–‍46
Detroit Tigers	76	86	.469	9	42‍–‍39	34‍–‍47
Kansas City Royals	69	93	.426	16	41‍–‍40	28‍–‍53

AL West
Team	W	L	Pct.	GB	Home	Road
^{(3)} Houston Astros	81	81	.500	—	39‍–‍42	42‍–‍39
Texas Rangers	80	82	.494	1	45‍–‍36	35‍–‍46
Seattle Mariners	76	86	.469	5	43‍–‍38	33‍–‍48
Athletics	64	98	.395	17	32‍–‍49	32‍–‍49
Los Angeles Angels	62	100	.383	19	34‍–‍47	28‍–‍53

=== National League ===
NL East
Team	W	L	Pct.	GB	Home	Road
^{(3)} Atlanta Braves	94	68	.580	—	52‍–‍29	42‍–‍39
^{(6)} Philadelphia Phillies	88	74	.543	6	43‍–‍38	45‍–‍36
Miami Marlins	80	82	.494	14	47‍–‍34	33‍–‍48
Washington Nationals	77	85	.475	17	39‍–‍42	38‍–‍43
New York Mets	74	88	.457	20	36‍–‍45	38‍–‍43

NL Central
Team	W	L	Pct.	GB	Home	Road
^{(1)} Milwaukee Brewers	103	59	.636	—	55‍–‍26	48‍–‍33
^{(5)} Chicago Cubs	89	73	.549	14	46‍–‍35	43‍–‍38
Pittsburgh Pirates	82	80	.506	21	44‍–‍37	38‍–‍43
St. Louis Cardinals	77	85	.475	26	38‍–‍43	39‍–‍42
Cincinnati Reds	75	87	.463	28	38‍–‍43	37‍–‍44

NL West
Team	W	L	Pct.	GB	Home	Road
^{(2)} Los Angeles Dodgers	100	62	.617	—	51‍–‍30	49‍–‍32
^{(4)} San Diego Padres	91	71	.562	9	51‍–‍30	40‍–‍41
Arizona Diamondbacks	86	76	.531	14	45‍–‍36	41‍–‍40
San Francisco Giants	65	97	.401	35	37‍–‍44	28‍–‍53
Colorado Rockies	58	104	.358	42	32‍–‍49	26‍–‍55

== Postseason ==
=== Bracket ===
Wild Card Series (ALWCS, NLWCS)
4	NY Yankees	2
5	Boston	0
3	Houston	0
6	Chicago White Sox	2
4	San Diego	2
5	Chicago Cubs	0
3	Atlanta	2
6	Philadelphia	1

Division Series (ALDS, NLDS)
1	Tampa Bay	3
4	NY Yankees	0
American League
2	Cleveland	3
6	Chicago White Sox	2
1	Milwaukee	3
4	San Diego	1
National League
2	LA Dodgers	3
3	Atlanta	1

Championship Series (ALCS, NLCS)
1	Tampa Bay	4
2	Cleveland	2
1	Milwaukee	4
2	LA Dodgers	0

World Series
AL1	Tampa Bay	1
NL1	Milwaukee	4

== Managerial changes ==
=== General managers ===
Team	Former GM	Interim GM	Reason for leaving	New GM	Notes
Colorado Rockies	Bill Schmidt	N/A	Resigned	Paul DePodesta	On October 1, 2025, Bill Schmidt resigned after five years as the team's head of baseball operations. Paul DePodesta was named the new head of baseball operations on November 7. DePodesta, who had served in the Cleveland Browns front office since 2016, has 20 years of baseball executive experience and this is his second major executive role. He was previously general manager of the Los Angeles Dodgers from 2004–2005.
Washington Nationals	Mike Rizzo	Mike DeBartolo	Fired	Ani Kilambi	On July 6, 2025, Mike Rizzo was fired after 17 years as the team's president of baseball operations. The Nationals named assistant general manager Mike DeBartolo as the interim general manager. Ani Kilambi was named the new general manager on December 17. This is his first major executive role. He was previously the assistant general manager for the Philadelphia Phillies until his hiring.

==== In-season ====
Team	Former GM	Interim GM	Reason For Leaving	New GM	Notes
Athletics	David Forst	Dan Feinstein	Fired	TBA	On August 7, Forst and the A's parted ways after 11 seasons as general manager and three straight playoff appearances from 2018–2020. Assistant GM Dan Feinstein was named interim for the rest of the season.
Houston Astros	Dana Brown	N/A	Mutually agree to part ways	TBA	On August 24, Brown and the Astros parted ways after four seasons as general manager and two playoff appearances.
Los Angeles Angels	Perry Minasian	John Mozeliak	Fired	TBA	On June 26, Perry Minasian was fired as general manager of the team after six seasons with no playoff appearances. Mozeliak, who spent 30 years in the Cardinals organization, was named interim general manager of the team for the rest of the season.

=== Field managers ===
==== Off-season ====
Team	Former manager	Interim manager	Reason for leaving	New manager	Notes
Atlanta Braves	Brian Snitker	N/A	Retired	Walt Weiss	On October 1, 2025, after a 76–86 (.469) 2025 season, the Braves and Brian Snitker mutually agreed to end his managerial tenure with the organization. He will be taking a front office role to remain with the Braves in an advisory capacity. Snitker finished his Braves career with a 811–668 (.548) record and seven postseason appearances, which resulted in a World Series title in 2021. Snitker was named NL Manager of the Year in 2018, leading the Braves to their first NL East division title since 2013. Weiss, their bench coach, was promoted as the new manager on November 3. He was previously the manager of the Colorado Rockies from 2013–16.
Baltimore Orioles	Brandon Hyde	Tony Mansolino	Fired	Craig Albernaz	On May 17, 2025, after a 15–28 (.349) start to the season, the Orioles fired Brandon Hyde. Hyde finished his Orioles managerial career with a 421–492 (.461) record with two postseason appearances. Hyde was named AL Manager of the Year in 2023, leading the Orioles to a 100-win season (their first since the 1980 season) and their first AL East division title since 2014. Tony Mansolino was named the interim manager for the remainder of the season. This was Mansolino's first managerial position. Albernaz was hired as the new manager on October 27. This will be his first managerial position.
Colorado Rockies	Bud Black	Warren Schaeffer	Fired	Warren Schaeffer	On May 11, 2025, after a 7–33 (.175) start to the season, the Rockies fired Bud Black. Black finished his Rockies managerial career with a 544–690 (.441) record with two postseason appearances. Warren Schaeffer was named the interim manager for the remainder of the season. This was Schaeffer's first managerial position. On November 24, the Rockies removed the interim tag and named Schaeffer as the new Rockies manager.
Los Angeles Angels	Ron Washington	Ray Montgomery	Option not exercised	Kurt Suzuki	On September 30, 2025, after a short 36–38 (.486) 2025 season due to being placed on medical leave on June 27 and undergoing a quadruple bypass heart surgery, the Angels announced that Ron Washington would not return in 2026. Washington finished his Angels career with a 109–137 (.443) record and no postseason appearances. Suzuki was hired as the new manager on October 21. This will be his first managerial position. He has previously served as special assistant to general manager Perry Minasian from 2023 to 2025 after finishing his playing career with the Angels from 2021 and 2022.
Minnesota Twins	Rocco Baldelli	N/A	Option not exercised	Derek Shelton	On September 29, 2025, after a 70–92 (.432) 2025 season, the Twins announced that Rocco Baldelli would not return in 2026. Baldelli finished his Twins career with a 527–505 (.511) record and three postseason appearances. He won the American League Manager of the Year Award in 2019. Shelton was hired as the new manager on October 30. He was previously the manager of the Pittsburgh Pirates for nearly six years from 2020–25.
San Diego Padres	Mike Shildt	N/A	Retired	Craig Stammen	On October 13, 2025, after a 90–72 (.556) 2025 season, Shildt announced his retirement, citing the severe toll of the job. Shildt finished his Padres career with a 183–141 (.565) record and two postseason appearances. Shildt was named NL Manager of the Year in 2019, while managing the St. Louis Cardinals. Stammen was hired as the new manager on November 6. He was previously in the Padres organization as an assistant to the major league coaching staff and baseball operations department from 2024 to 2025 after finishing his playing career with the Padres from 2017 to 2022.
San Francisco Giants	Bob Melvin	N/A	Fired	Tony Vitello	On September 29, 2025, after a 81–81 (.500) 2025 season, the Giants fired Bob Melvin. Melvin finished his Giants career with a 161–163 (.497) record and no postseason appearances. Vitello, the coach at Tennessee, was hired as the new manager on October 22. This will be his first managerial position. He is the first individual to transition directly from a college program to managing an MLB team without prior professional coaching experience.
Texas Rangers	Bruce Bochy	N/A	Contract expired	Skip Schumaker	On September 29, 2025, after a 81–81 (.500) 2025 season, the Rangers and Bruce Bochy mutually agreed to end his managerial tenure with the organization. He has been offered a front office role to remain with the Rangers in an advisory capacity. Bochy finished his Rangers career with a 249–237 (.512) record and one postseason appearance, which resulted in a World Series title in 2023. Schumaker was hired as the new manager on October 13. He previously served as the manager for the Miami Marlins from 2023–24 before leaving to become the special advisor to Texas Rangers general manager Chris Young in 2025.
Washington Nationals	Dave Martinez	Miguel Cairo	Fired	Blake Butera	On July 6, 2025, after a 37–53 (.411) start to the season, the Nationals fired Dave Martinez. Martinez finished his Nationals career with a 500–622 (.446) record with one postseason appearance, which resulted in a World Series title in 2019. Miguel Cairo was named interim manager on July 7. This was Cairo's second stint as manager after leading the Chicago White Sox in 2022 with a record of 18–16 (.529). On October 31, Blake Butera was hired as the new permanent manager of the team, making this his first managerial position.

==== In-season ====
Team	Former manager	Interim manager	Reason for leaving	New manager	Notes
Boston Red Sox	Alex Cora	Chad Tracy	Fired	Chad Tracy	On April 25, after a 10–17 (.370) start to the season, the Red Sox fired Alex Cora. During his eight seasons with the Red Sox, Cora ended his time in Boston with a record of 620–541 (.534) with three playoff appearances, including a World Series title in 2018. Tracy, the manager of the Worcester Red Sox, was named as the interim manager. This is his first major-league managerial position. On September 22, the Red Sox made Tracy their permanent manager, signing a three year contract through 2030.
Philadelphia Phillies	Rob Thomson	Don Mattingly	Fired		On April 28, after a 9–19 (.321) start to the season, the Phillies fired Rob Thomson. During his five seasons with the Phillies, Thomson ended his time in Philadelphia with a record of 355–270 (.568) with four playoff appearance, including an appearance in the 2022 World Series. Mattingly, the bench coach of the Phillies, was named as the interim manager. This is his third managerial position, having served as manager for the Los Angeles Dodgers from 2011–2015, and manager for the Miami Marlins from 2016–2022 where he compiled a record of 889–950 (.483).
New York Mets	Carlos Mendoza	Andy Green	Fired	Andy Green	On June 26, after a 34–47 (.420) start to the season, the Mets fired Carlos Mendoza. During his three seasons with the Mets, Mendoza ended his time with a record of 206–199 (.509) with one playoff appearance. Green, the vice president of player development of the Mets, was named as the interim manager. This is his second managerial position, having served as manager for the San Diego Padres from 2016–2019, where he compiled a record of 274–366 (.428). On September 22, the Mets made Green their permanent manager, signing him to a three year deal.

== League leaders ==
=== American League ===
Hitting leaders
Stat	Player	Total
AVG	Yordan Alvarez (HOU)	.316
OPS	Yordan Alvarez (HOU)	1.036
HR	Pete Alonso (BAL)	43
RBI	Pete Alonso (BAL)	113
R	Randy Arozarena (SEA)	112
H	Yandy Díaz (TB)	180
SB	Chandler Simpson (TB)	46

Pitching leaders
Stat	Player	Total
W	Sonny Gray (BOS)	18
L	Shane Baz (BAL); Tanner Bibee (CLE)	15
ERA	Cam Schlittler (NYY)	1.95
K	Gavin Williams (CLE)	248
IP	Michael Wacha (KC)	200.1
SV	Bryan Baker (TB); Cade Smith (CLE)	41
WHIP	Drew Rasmussen (TB)	0.91

=== National League ===
Hitting leaders
Stat	Player	Total
AVG	Gabriel Moreno (ARI)	.311
OPS	Pete Crow-Armstrong (CHC)	.943
HR	Pete Crow-Armstrong (CHC); Kyle Schwarber (PHI)	45
RBI	Alec Burleson (STL)	116
R	Pete Crow-Armstrong (CHC)	119
H	Otto Lopez (MIA)	191
SB	Nasim Nuñez (WAS)	49

Pitching leaders
Stat	Player	Total
W	Cristopher Sánchez (PHI)	18
L	Brady Singer (CIN)	15
ERA	Jacob Misiorowski (MIL)	1.80
K	Jacob Misiorowski (MIL)	252
IP	Sandy Alcántara (MIA)	214.0
SV	Mason Miller (SD); Riley O'Brien (STL)	38
WHIP	Jacob Misiorowski (MIL)	0.80

== Milestones ==
=== Batters ===
- Chase DeLauter (CLE):
  - Became the seventh player to hit two home runs in his Major League debut on March 26, hitting home runs in the first and ninth innings.
  - Homered in his first three career regular-season games against the Seattle Mariners, becoming the third player in Major League history to achieve this mark. He joins Trevor Story (2016) and Kyle Lewis in 2019. Story homered in his first four career games.
- José Fernández (ARI):
  - Became the eighth player to hit two home runs in his Major League debut on March 31, hitting home runs in the fourth and eighth innings.
- Munetaka Murakami (CWS):
  - Homered in his first three career regular-season games against the Milwaukee Brewers, becoming the fourth player in Major League history to achieve this mark. He joins Trevor Story, Kyle Lewis, and Chase DeLauter.
  - Hit his fourth home run of the season on April 4 against the Toronto Blue Jays. The four home runs are the most by a Japanese-born player in his first eight career games.
  - Tied a Major League rookie record by hitting a home run in his fifth consecutive game on April 22 against the Arizona Diamondbacks. He became the 13th rookie to achieve this mark.
  - With his 10th home run on April 22 against the Arizona Diamondbacks, Murakami's ten home runs are the most in Major League history by a Japanese-born player in his first 24 games.
  - With his 15th home run on May 8 against the Seattle Mariners, Murakami has become the first player in Major League history to homer in the first game of eight straight series.
  - Set the Major League rookie record for most home runs by a Japanese-born player by hitting his 34th home run on September 25 against the Colorado Rockies. He broke the record of 33 home runs set earlier in the season by Kazuma Okamoto. Murakami hit his record-breaking home run in the first inning off fellow countryman pitcher Tomoyuki Sugano, then added his 35th home run later in the game, also against Sugano.
- Joey Wiemer (WAS):
  - Tied the Major League record for most consecutive plate appearances to reach base to start a season with ten on March 30 against the Philadelphia Phillies. He is the second player in the live ball era (since 1920) to reach base ten consecutive times to start the season, tying Carlos Delgado of the Toronto Blue Jays, who accomplished this feat in 2002.
- Munetaka Murakami / Colson Montgomery (CWS):
  - With their home runs on April 22 against the Arizona Diamondbacks, Murakami (five games) and Montgomery (four games) became the first set of teammates to each homer in four consecutive games in Major League History.
  - With home runs in the same game on May 1, it was the seventh time this season that Murakami and Montgomery homered in the same game. That's the most by any teammate duo in their team's first 35 games of a season in Major League history, and it was only game 32. The duo broke a tie at six with 1994 Colorado Rockies' Andres Galarraga and Ellis Burks, 1980 Philadelphia Phillies' Mike Schmidt and Greg Luzinski, and 1956 New York Yankees' Mickey Mantle and Yogi Berra.
- Kyle Schwarber (PHI):
  - Recorded his 350th career home run on April 30 against the San Francisco Giants in the first inning of game one. He became the 105th player to reach this mark. Schwarber now ranks seventh in Major League history in the fewest career games to 350 home runs, with 1,321 games played. The six that were faster are Aaron Judge, Mark McGwire, Juan González, Alex Rodriguez, Harmon Killebrew, and Albert Pujols.
  - With his 30th home run on June 28 against the New York Mets, Schwarber became the ninth player in Major League history to hit 30-plus home runs in each of their first five seasons with a franchise. He joins Babe Ruth (NYY), Jimmie Foxx (BOS), Barry Bonds (SF), Manny Ramirez (BOS), Albert Pujols (STL), David Ortiz (BOS), Alex Rodriguez (NYY), and Miguel Cabrera (DET).
- Ildemaro Vargas (ARI):
  - Started the season with a 24-game hit streak (27 total games dating back to the previous season), which was the longest hitting streak by a Venezuelan-born player, eclipsing the previous mark of 26 set by Wilson Ramos of the Mets in 2019. The 24-game streak was the second-longest streak to open a season since 1940.
- Nick Kurtz (ATH):
  - Recorded his 20th consecutive game with a walk on May 2 against the Cleveland Guardians. Kurtz is now tied with Barry Bonds, while the all-time record is 22 games set by Roy Cullenbine during the 1947 season. The walk streak ended the next day at 20 games.
- Paul Goldschmidt (NYY):
  - On May 24 against the Tampa Bay Rays, Goldschmidt struck out for his 2,000th career time, becoming the ninth player to reach this mark. Goldschmidt struck out in the seventh inning against Drew Rasmussen.
- Freddie Freeman (LAD):
  - Recorded his 2,500th career hit with a single in the seventh inning against the Pittsburgh Pirates on June 9. He became the 102nd player to reach this feat.
- Braden Montgomery (CWS):
  - Became the fifth player in Major League history to hit a walk-off homer in his debut on June 9 against the Atlanta Braves. He joins Carlos Pérez (2015), Miguel Cabrera (2003), Josh Bard (2002), and Billy Parker (1971) on this feat.
- Shohei Ohtani (LAD):
  - Became the first Japanese-born player to hit 300 major league home runs when he hit a lead-off home run in the bottom of the first inning on July 7 against the Colorado Rockies. He also became the 170th player to hit 300 career home runs.
- Tyler Tolbert (KC):
  - Tied the Major League record with a hit in 12 consecutive plate appearances on July 7 against the New York Mets. Tolbert is now tied with the Twins' José Miranda (2024), the Tigers' Walt Dropo (1952), the Red Sox's Pinky Higgins (1938), and the Cubs' Johnny Kling (1902) for the all-time lead.
- James Wood (WAS):
  - Wood entered the All-Star Break with an unprecedented 21-run lead over the next closest player, shattering Ted Williams’ 1946 record of 19. Wood has scored 89 runs on the season, while Bryan Reynolds of the Pittsburgh Pirates sits in second place with 68.
- Nolan Arenado (ARI):
  - Recorded his 2,000th career hit with a double in the fifth inning against the Athletics on July 20. He became the 299th player to reach this feat.
- Kazuma Okamoto (TOR):
  - Set a Major League rookie record for most home runs by a Japanese-born player by hitting his 23rd home run on July 24 against the Boston Red Sox. He broke the record that was set by Shohei Ohtani during the 2018 season.
- CJ Abrams / James Wood (WAS):
  - With his 25th home run of the season on July 25 against the Arizona Diamondbacks, Abrams (25 home runs, 17 stolen bases) and Wood (28 home runs, 15 stolen bases) became the second duo in Major League history to record 25-plus home runs and 15-plus stolen bases in their club's first 105 games of the season. They joined Francisco Lindor and José Ramírez of the Cleveland Indians, who accomplished this during the 2018 season.
- Joshua Báez (STL):
  - Became the first player in Major League history to hit three home runs in their league debut on August 15 against the Chicago Cubs. He also became the 33rd player in Major League history to hit a home run on the very first career pitch.
- Pete Crow-Armstrong (CHC):
  - Hit a leadoff and walk-off home run against the Chicago White Sox on August 17, becoming the sixth player in Major League history to accomplish this feat. The other five players are Chris Young (August 7, 2010), Ian Kinsler (July 19, 2009), Reed Johnson (June 15, 2003), Darin Erstad (June 25, 2000), and Vic Power (May 7, 1957).
  - On September 24, Crow-Armstrong became the seventh player in Major League history to achieve a 40–40 season after stealing his 40th base of the season against the Miami Marlins. Crow-Armstrong hit his 40th home run on September 6, also against the Miami Marlins. He joined Jose Canseco (1988), Barry Bonds (1996), Alex Rodriguez (1998), Alfonso Soriano (2006), Ronald Acuña Jr. (2023), and Shohei Ohtani (2024) as the only players to reach this feat.
- Randy Arozarena (SEA):
  - Hit a leadoff and walk-off homer against the Chicago Cubs on August 22, becoming the seventh player in Major League history to accomplish this feat.
- Austin Wells (NYY):
  - Became the first player in Major League history to enter a game as a pinch-hitter, and later hit multiple home runs in the same inning. On August 30, Wells entered as a pinch-hitter in the sixth inning before hitting two home runs in the eighth inning in a 16-1 win over the Boston Red Sox.
- Ronald Acuña Jr. (ATL):
  - With his 200th career home run on September 2 against the Washington Nationals, Acuña Jr. became the fastest player in Major League history to have 200 career home runs and 200 career stolen bases. Acuña Jr. accomplished this in his 904th game, eclipsing the mark set by Alfonso Soriano in 929 games.
- Julio Rodríguez (SEA):
  - With his 20th stolen base of the season on September 3 against the Athletics, Rodríguez became the first player in Major League history to begin his career with five consecutive 20-home run, 20-stolen base seasons.
- Sal Stewart (CIN) / Munetaka Murakami (CWS) / Kazuma Okamoto (TOR):
  - When Okamoto hit his 30th home run of the season on September 8 against the Athletics, Stewart, Murakami, and Okamoto became the first trio of rookies in Major League history to hit 30 or more home runs in the same season.
- Jose Altuve (HOU):
  - Recorded his 2,500th career hit with a double in the third inning on September 9 against the Philadelphia Phillies. Altuve became the 103rd player to reach this mark.
- Corbin Carroll (ARI):
  - With his 20th home run of the season on September 12 against the Texas Rangers, Carroll became the first player in Major League history to have multiple seasons of 20 or more home runs, 20 or more stolen bases, 30 or more doubles, and 15 or more triples. He previously accomplished this in the 2025 season. The five other players with the same stat line are Curtis Granderson (2007), Jimmy Rollins (2007), Juan Samuel (1987), Chuck Klein (1932) and Frank Schulte (1911).
  - Carroll became the first player in National League history to lead the league in triples for four consecutive seasons.
- Ethan Salas (SD):
  - Hit two home runs on September 16 against the Colorado Rockies, becoming the youngest catcher (20 years, 107 days old) in Major League history with two home runs in the same game.
- Colson Montgomery (CWS):
  - On September 24, Montgomery set an American League record for most strikeouts in a season with 223. This broke the record held by Adam Dunn set in 2012. He also tied the Major League record set by Mark Reynolds accomplished in 2009.
  - Set the Major League record on September 25, in the fifth inning, against the Colorado Rockies for most strikeouts in a season. His 224th strikeout broke the record set in 2009 by Mark Reynolds. Montgomery finished the season with 227 strikeouts.
- Pete Alonso (BAL):
  - Became the first player in Major League history to win an RBI title in both leagues. He led the American League this year and the National League title in 2022 as a member of the New York Mets.
- Gabriel Moreno (ARI):
  - Became only the fifth catcher in Major League history to win a batting title in either league. He also became the first Diamondback to win a batting title. Moreno joined fellow catchers: Buster Posey (2012), Joe Mauer (2006), Ernie Lombardi (1938, 1942), and Bubbles Hargrave (1926) to the lead the league.
- Ronald Acuña Jr. (ATL) / Luisangel Acuña (CWS):
  - On September 30, the Acuñas became the first brothers with multiple steals each in the same postseason, let alone on the same day, and the first brothers to each steal two bases in an inning during their postseason careers.

=== Pitchers ===
==== No-hitters ====
- Tatsuya Imai / Steven Okert / Alimber Santa (HOU):
  - Threw the 18th no-hitter in Astros history on May 25 against the Texas Rangers. Imai went the first six innings throwing 97 pitches (57 for strikes) while walking four and striking out two. Okert pitched the seventh walking one and striking out one in 15 pitches (eight for strikes). Making his Major League debut, Santa closed out the combined no-hitter by pitching the last two innings with 24 pitches (16 for strikes) and striking out Brandon Nimmo to end the game.

==== Other pitching accomplishments ====
- José Soriano (LAA)/(TOR):
  - As a member of the Angels, Soriano became the first pitcher in Major League history (excluding openers) to allow just one run through the first six starts of a season. His 0.24 ERA is the lowest in a pitcher's first six starts of a season since earned runs became official in both leagues in 1913.
- Chris Sale (ATL):
  - Recorded his 150th career win on April 26 against the Philadelphia Phillies. Sale becomes the 267th player to reach this mark.
- Tyler Glasnow (LAD):
  - Recorded his 1,000th career strikeout in the first inning on May 5 against the Houston Astros by fanning Yordan Alvarez. Glasnow became the fastest starting pitcher in Major League history to reach 1,000 strikeouts at just 793 innings. He broke the record that was held by Freddy Peralta with 804 2/3 innings.
- Jacob deGrom (TEX):
  - Recorded his 1,900th career strikeout by striking out Seiya Suzuki of the Chicago Cubs in the first inning on May 10. He became the second-fastest pitcher to 1,900 strikeouts in both games (256 to Randy Johnson's 252) and innings (1,577 1/3 to Chris Sale's 1,560 1/3).
  - Recorded his 2,000th career strikeout by striking out Abimelec Ortiz of the Washington Nationals in the first inning on August 20. He became the 94th player to reach this mark. He also became the second-fastest pitcher to 2,000 strikeouts in both games (272 to Randy Johnson's 262) and innings (1,661 to Chris Sale's 1,626).
- Kevin Gausman (TOR)/(CHC):
  - As a member of the Blue Jays, Gausman recorded his 2,000th career strikeout by striking out Hunter Feduccia of the Tampa Bay Rays in the fourth inning on May 11. He became the 91st player to reach this mark.
- Cristopher Sánchez (PHI):
  - Set the Major League record for the longest scoreless innings streak by a left-handed pitcher against the San Diego Padres on June 3 with 50 2/3 innings. Sánchez's scoreless streak is the fifth-longest in league history, behind Orel Hershiser (59 innings), Don Drysdale (58), Walter Johnson (55 2/3), and Jack Coombs (53).
- Max Scherzer (TOR):
  - Recorded his 3,500th career strikeout by fanning Kyle Schwarber of the Philadelphia Phillies in the first inning on June 10. He became the 11th player to reach this achievement.
  - Recorded his 3,000th inning pitched against the Boston Red Sox on August 13. He became the 139th player to reach this mark.
- Aaron Ashby (MIL):
  - On June 16 against the Cleveland Guardians, Ashby became the second pitcher in Major League history to be the first to 10 wins while having all of them come in relief, joining Elroy Face during the 1959 season. His 10 wins through the Brewers’ first 70 games are the fourth-most for a reliever in that span, joining Mace Brown (1938 with 12), Clay Carroll (1969 with 11), and Face (1959 with 11).
- Sonny Gray (BOS):
  - Recorded his 2,000th career strikeout by fanning Spencer Jones in the eighth inning on June 28. He became the 92nd player to reach this mark.
- Aroldis Chapman (BOS):
  - Set the Major League record for the most strikeouts by a relief pitcher on July 3 against the Los Angeles Angels. Chapman struck out Denzer Guzmán for his 1,364th strikeout, breaking a tie that he held with Hoyt Wilhelm.
  - Recorded his 400th career save by closing out the game on September 6 against the Baltimore Orioles. Chapman becomes the ninth player to reach this mark.
- Aaron Nola (PHI):
  - Recorded his 2,000th career strikeout by fanning Brandon Valenzuela in the second inning on August 8. He became the 93rd player to reach this mark.
- Jacob Misiorowski (MIL):
  - Recorded his 200th strikeout of the season by striking out Alan Roden of the Minnesota Twins on August 9, needing only 129 1/3 innings to reach this level. Only one pitcher in Major League history has ever reached 200 strikeouts faster than Misiorowski did – Spencer Strider of the Atlanta Braves needed just 123 1/3 innings in 2023.
- Zack Wheeler (PHI):
  - Recorded his 2,000th career strikeout by fanning Brice Turang of the Milwaukee Brewers in the first inning on September 22. He became the 95th player to reach this mark.

=== Miscellaneous ===
- Toronto Blue Jays:
  - Struck out 50 Athletics over the first weekend of the season, setting a new Major League record for strikeouts in the season's first three games.
- Pittsburgh Pirates:
  - The Pirates drew seven consecutive walks in the second inning against the Cincinnati Reds on May 2, tying the Major League mark set by the Chicago White Sox (Aug. 28, 1909) and Atlanta Braves (May 25, 1983).
- Philadelphia Phillies:
  - Became the first team in Major League history to hit a go-ahead home run in the ninth inning of three consecutive games. The Phils accomplished this feat against the Washington Nationals on June 23–25. Bryson Stott, Derek Hill, and Bryce Harper were the home run hitters in the three games, respectively.
- Dave Roberts (LAD):
  - Recorded his 1,000th career victory as a manager on June 30 against the Athletics, becoming the fastest manager in Major League history to reach this mark. Roberts reached the milestone in his 1,606th game, besting the record held by Cap Anson of 1,641 decisions. He is the 69th manager to reach this milestone.
- Kansas City Royals:
  - Scored at least one run in every inning that they came to bat on July 6 against the Philadelphia Phillies. The Royals became the 21st team in Major League history to accomplish this feat in the 15–1 victory.
- New York Yankees:
  - Became the first team in American League history whose batters struck out 17 times in consecutive nine-inning games against the Tampa Bay Rays on July 6–7.
- Jacob Wilson (ATH):
  - Set a Major League record with his 111th consecutive error-free performance at shortstop against the Boston Red Sox on August 9. He broke the record that was set in 2002 by Mike Bordick of the Baltimore Orioles.
- Cleveland Guardians:
  - Became the third American League franchise (joining the New York Yankees and Boston Red Sox, among franchises established since 1900) to record 10,000 wins with their victory against the San Diego Padres on August 15.
  - Set a record for a postseason nine-inning game by throwing 19 strikeouts against the Chicago White Sox on October 7.
  - Set a record for a nine-inning game, regular season or postseason, by throwing 21 strikeouts against the White Sox on October 10.
- Milwaukee Brewers:
  - Tied the modern-era (since 1900) Major League record for largest shutout with a 22–0 victory over the Seattle Mariners on August 18. The Brewers tied the record shared by the Pittsburgh Pirates (September 16, 1975) and the Cleveland Indians (August 31, 2004). A 20–0 victory over the Cincinnati Reds on September 11 made the Brewers the first MLB team since 1900 to win two games by at least 20 runs in a season.
- Chicago Cubs:
  - Hit 62 home runs during the month of August, setting a National League record for most home runs in a month. They broke the record of 61, set by the Atlanta Braves in June 2023.
- Washington Nationals:
  - With another blown save against the San Diego Padres on September 9, the Nationals set a Major League record for most blown saves in a season with 38. The Nationals broke the record of 37 that was held by the 2021 Washington Nationals and the 2024 Chicago White Sox.
- Chicago White Sox:
  - Became the first team in Major League history to make the playoffs after losing 100-plus games in at least two consecutive seasons (they had three such seasons).
- Los Angeles Angels:
  - Lost their 100th game of the season on September 27 against the Seattle Mariners. They became the last current franchise to have a 100-loss season in their franchise history.
- Houston Astros:
  - Became the first team in Major league Baseball history to win a divisional title and qualify for the postseason (following a complete 162 game season) without a winning record, finishing the season with a record of 81–81 (.500).

== Awards and honors ==
=== Regular season ===
Baseball Writers' Association of America Awards
BBWAA Award	National League	American League
Rookie of the Year	Sal Stewart (CIN)	Kevin McGonigle (DET)
Manager of the Year	Pat Murphy (MIL)	Will Venable (CWS)
Relief Pitcher of the Year	Mason Miller (SD)	Louis Varland (TOR)
Cy Young Award	Jacob Misiorowski (MIL)	Cam Schlittler (NYY)
Most Valuable Player	Pete Crow-Armstrong (CHC)	Yordan Álvarez (HOU)
Gold Glove Awards
Position	National League	American League
Pitcher	Nolan McLean (NYM)	Tanner Bibee (CLE)
Catcher	Gabriel Moreno (ARI)	Dillon Dingler (DET)
1st Base	Matt Olson (ATL)	Christian Walker (HOU)
2nd Base	Brice Turang (MIL)	Cole Young (SEA)
3rd Base	Alex Bregman (CHC)	Caleb Durbin (BOS)
Shortstop	Geraldo Perdomo (ARI)	Taylor Walls (TB)
Left field	Jackson Chourio (MIL)	Cody Bellinger (NYY)
Center field	Pete Crow-Armstrong (CHC)	Ceddanne Rafaela (BOS)
Right field	Corbin Carroll (ARI)	Wilyer Abreu (BOS)
Utility	Mauricio Dubón (ATL)	Ezequiel Durán (TEX)
Team	Chicago Cubs	Toronto Blue Jays
Platinum Glove	Pete Crow-Armstrong (CHC)	Cody Bellinger (NYY)
Silver Slugger Awards
Designated Hitter	Kyle Schwarber (PHI)	Yordan Álvarez (HOU)
Catcher	Gabriel Moreno (ARI)	Dillon Dingler (DET)
1st Base	Matt Olson (ATL)	Pete Alonso (BAL)
2nd Base	Brandon Lowe (PIT)	Chase Meidroth (CWS)
3rd Base	Alex Bregman (CHC)	Junior Caminero (TB)
Shortstop	Elly De La Cruz (CIN)	Bobby Witt Jr. (KC)
Outfield	Pete Crow-Armstrong (CHC); Jackson Chourio (MIL); James Wood (WAS)	Randy Arozarena (SEA); Chase DeLauter (CLE); Riley Greene (DET)
Utility	Jake Bauers (MIL)	Kevin McGonigle (DET)
Team	Chicago Cubs	Houston Astros

=== All-MLB Team ===
Players are selected through fan votes (50%) and votes from a panel of experts (50%). The winners will be selected based on merit, with no set number of nominees per position and no distinction between leagues.

All-MLB Team
Position	First Team	Second Team
Starting pitcher	Jacob Misiorowski (MIL)	Tarik Skubal (LAD)/(DET)
Starting pitcher	Cam Schlittler (NYY)	Yoshinobu Yamamoto (LAD)
Starting pitcher	Dylan Cease (TOR)	Sonny Gray (BOS)
Starting pitcher	Cristopher Sánchez (PHI)	Jesús Luzardo (PHI)
Starting pitcher	Chris Sale (ATL)	Drew Rasmussen (TB)
Relief pitcher	Mason Miller (SD)	Bryan Baker (TB)
Relief pitcher	Louis Varland (TOR)	Cade Smith (CLE)
Designated hitter	Yordan Alvarez (HOU)	Ben Rice (NYY)
Catcher	Gabriel Moreno (ARI)	William Contreras (MIL)
1st Base	Pete Alonso (BAL)	Willson Contreras (BOS)
2nd Base	Brice Turang (MIL)	Brandon Lowe (PIT)
3rd Base	Junior Caminero (TB)	Alex Bregman (CHC)
Shortstop	Bobby Witt Jr. (KC)	Elly De La Cruz (CIN)
Outfield	Pete Crow-Armstrong (CHC)	Randy Arozarena (SEA)
Outfield	Jackson Chourio (MIL)	Jordan Walker (STL)
Outfield	Fernando Tatís Jr. (SD)	James Wood (WAS)

=== Other awards ===
- The Sporting News Player of the Year Award: Pete Crow-Armstrong (CHC)
- Comeback Players of the Year: Zack Wheeler (PHI, National); Yordan Alvarez (HOU, American)
- Edgar Martínez Award (Best designated hitter): Yordan Alvarez (HOU
- Hank Aaron Award: Pete Crow-Armstrong (CHC, National); Yordan Alvarez (HOU, American)
- Roberto Clemente Award (Humanitarian): Francisco Lindor (NYM)
- Mariano Rivera AL Reliever of the Year Award (Best AL reliever): Bryan Baker (TB)
- Trevor Hoffman NL Reliever of the Year Award (Best NL reliever): Mason Miller (SD)
- Heart & Hustle Award: Bobby Witt Jr. (KC)
- Warren Spahn Award (Best left-handed pitcher):

Fielding Bible Awards
Position	Player
Pitcher	Tanner Bibee (CLE)
Catcher	Dillon Dingler (DET)
1st Base	Matt Olson (ATL)
2nd Base	Brice Turang (MIL)
3rd Base	Alex Bregman (CHC)
Shortstop	Taylor Walls (TB)
Left Field	Cody Bellinger (NYY)
Center Field	Ceddanne Rafaela (BOS)
Right Field	Wilyer Abreu (BOS)
Multi-position	Zach McKinstry (DET)

=== Monthly awards ===
==== Player of the Month ====
Month	American League	National League
April	Yordan Alvarez	Ildemaro Vargas
May	Nick Kurtz	JJ Bleday
June	Junior Caminero	Pete Crow-Armstrong
July	Yordan Alvarez	CJ Abrams
August	Jac Caglianone	Pete Crow-Armstrong
September	Carter Jensen	Elly De La Cruz

==== Rookie of the Month ====
Month	American League	National League
April	Kevin McGonigle	Sal Stewart
May	Munetaka Murakami	T. J. Rumfield
June	Kazuma Okamoto	T. J. Rumfield
July	Chase DeLauter	Esmerlyn Valdez
August	Tristan Peters	Sal Stewart
September	Carter Jensen	Cole Carrigg

==== Pitcher of the Month ====
Month	American League	National League
April	José Soriano	Shohei Ohtani
May	Spencer Arrighetti	Cristopher Sánchez
June	Drew Rasmussen	Logan Webb
July	Dylan Cease	Chris Sale
August	Noah Cameron	Jesús Luzardo
September	Freddy Peralta	Jared Jones

==== Reliever of the Month ====
Month	American League	National League
April	Louis Varland	Mason Miller
May	Cade Smith	Mason Miller
June	Jacob Latz	Jhoan Durán
July	Aroldis Chapman	Mason Miller
August	Josh Hader	Trevor Megill
September	Cade Smith	Mason Montgomery

== Home field attendance and payroll ==
Team name	Wins	%±	Home attendance	%±	Per game	Est. payroll	%±
Los Angeles Dodgers	100	7.3%	4,034,219	0.5%	49,805	$368,699,449	8.6%
San Diego Padres	91	−2.2%	3,347,081	0.5%	41,322	$244,246,082	42.0%
Toronto Blue Jays	79	−17.3%	3,338,878	15.8%	41,221	$221,400,344	−8.9%
New York Yankees	93	−1.1%	3,297,154	−2.9%	41,214	$284,070,933	6.6%
Philadelphia Phillies	88	−8.7%	3,230,526	−4.4%	39,883	$257,217,617	−8.0%
Chicago Cubs	89	−3.3%	2,969,583	−1.6%	36,662	$241,411,079	34.9%
Seattle Mariners	76	−16.9%	2,883,798	12.8%	35,602	$142,791,880	−1.5%
San Francisco Giants	65	−21.9%	2,856,810	−2.4%	35,269	$152,362,856	−12.1%
Boston Red Sox	87	−2.3%	2,827,315	1.8%	34,905	$237,693,334	19.1%
Atlanta Braves	94	21.2%	2,800,446	−3.6%	34,573	$275,725,000	21.1%
Milwaukee Brewers	103	6.0%	2,788,934	5.1%	34,431	$146,580,000	40.3%
New York Mets	74	−11.5%	2,712,120	−16.0%	33,483	$267,817,634	−16.0%
Los Angeles Angels	62	−14.9%	2,631,919	0.6%	32,493	$136,988,096	−23.1%
Houston Astros	81	−7.1%	2,472,118	−9.8%	30,520	$210,361,666	2.8%
Texas Rangers	80	−1.2%	2,406,217	0.4%	29,706	$181,925,000	−13.4%
Detroit Tigers	76	−13.5%	2,322,853	−3.8%	28,677	$144,281,859	8.2%
Arizona Diamondbacks	86	7.2%	2,288,586	−4.5%	28,254	$205,921,284	14.5%
Colorado Rockies	58	29.7%	2,245,426	−6.8%	27,721	$87,189,286	−18.3%
St. Louis Cardinals	77	−1.3%	2,233,902	−0.7%	27,579	$96,396,498	-26.5%
Cleveland Guardians	85	−3.5%	2,001,415	−2.5%	24,709	$75,256,711	−16.5%
Cincinnati Reds	75	−10.1%	1,991,703	−8.6%	24,589	$109,118,333	9.9%
Chicago White Sox	84	33.3%	1,986,425	31.5%	24,524	$78,630,000	21.4%
Washington Nationals	77	15.4%	1,839,116	−4.1%	22,705	$63,662,500	−44.6%
Baltimore Orioles	79	5.2%	1,829,252	1.4%	22,583	$114,287,000	−18.8%
Minnesota Twins	77	9.5%	1,740,366	−1.6%	21,486	$100,684,523	−29.5%
Pittsburgh Pirates	82	14.4%	1,704,229	11.1%	21,040	$95,694,833	31.3%
Kansas City Royals	69	−17.2%	1,527,098	−13.5%	18,853	$102,364,445	−7.7%
Tampa Bay Rays	98	24.0%	1,414,975	57.1%	17,469	$79,339,545	−13.2%
Miami Marlins	80	1.3%	1,231,018	6.2%	15,198	$50,190,000	13.0%
Athletics	64	−17.1%	799,240	3.9%	9,867	$77,427,857	28.4%

== Venues ==
The Athletics played their June 8–14 homestand at Las Vegas Ballpark in Summerlin South, Nevada, the home of their Pacific Coast League affiliate, the Las Vegas Aviators, as a preview for their eventual relocation to Las Vegas.

The Tampa Bay Rays returned to Tropicana Field in St. Petersburg, Florida, which had been damaged by Hurricane Milton, forcing the team to play their 2025 home games at George M. Steinbrenner Field in Tampa, Florida.

The Los Angeles Dodgers sold naming rights to its field to fashion company Uniqlo on March 16, renaming the stadium to Uniqlo Field at Dodger Stadium. It is the first time in the stadium's 64-year history that it has had a naming rights sponsor.

== Uniforms ==
=== Wholesale changes ===
- The Athletics unveiled a new gold alternate uniform, featuring a "Sacramento" script across the chest. This jersey replaces the existing gold alternate jersey with the "A's" logo featured on the chest.
- The Brewers tweaked their primary road uniform, swapping the gray base on the jersey in favor of powder blue. The Brewers become the third team since 2024 to wear colored jerseys as a primary road option following the Seattle Mariners and the Tampa Bay Rays, and the first to wear powder blue as a primary road uniform color since the Kansas City Royals and Montreal Expos in 1991.
- The Orioles add a new alternate cap, featuring an orange "B" script lettering from their road uniform inside a black cap with orange brim.
- The Marlins unveiled a new teal alternate uniform, harkening back to the team's inaugural color scheme.
- The Mariners replaced their retro-inspired cream alternate uniform in favor of a white home uniform based on the uniforms worn by the Negro league Seattle Steelheads.
- The Twins changed their navy alternate uniform, replacing "MINNESOTA" with the "Twins" script on the chest along with the Minnesota outline replacing the "TC" insignia on the sleeve.
- The Tigers unveiled two new alternate uniforms. The home orange alternate featured the white-trimmed navy Old English "D" logo on the left chest, while the road navy alternate featured the white and navy-trimmed orange script "Detroit" wordmark that appears on their primary road uniform. Both uniforms are paired with a navy cap with orange brim featuring the orange Old English "D" logo. These alternates marked the first time since 1995 that the Tigers wore an official alternate uniform (which they only wore for one game), excluding City Connect and one-off themed uniforms.
- The Giants updated their black alternate uniform, featuring "GIGANTES" (the Spanish translation of the team name) on the chest, gray accents and a step fret design.
- The Dodgers added a blue road alternate uniform with a script "Los Angeles" in front. The Dodgers became the only team with two road alternate uniforms, as they continue to wear a gray road alternate uniform with a script "Los Angeles" on the chest.
- From August 14 until the end of the season, the Cardinals switched to their alternate navy caps with the primary gray uniform for a majority of their remaining road games following a fan poll. It is unknown if the switch will be permanent for 2027 and beyond.
- The Rays unveiled a new gray road uniform featuring "TAMPA BAY" on the front which they debuted on September 22 against the Yankees. The design is a modern version of the original road uniforms they wore from 1998 to 2000, and will serve as a primary road uniform beginning in 2027. The Columbia blue tops would be retired following this season.

=== City Connect ===
Eight teams unveiled new City Connect 2.0 uniforms this season.

- The Braves' second City Connect uniforms are inspired by the team's uniforms from the 1970s and 1980s, with a baby blue color scheme and white pants, red and blue piping on the sleeves and pants, and the script logo and cap insignia both being white with red outlines. The sleeves feature an "ATL" insignia modeled after the former logo of TBS, in homage to the team's former broadcasts on the station.
- The Orioles' second City Connect uniform pays tribute to Camden Yards due to the popularity of the park, which is considered the ballpark which changed how modern baseball stadiums were developed. The jersey is a cream color base, which features "BMORE" across its chest in a dark green that matches the color of their outfield wall and orange outlines. It also features an Oriole bird perched on top of the "R", which marks a return of the Oriole logo to their uniform set. It has a homerun patch on the left sleeve which pays tribute to Eutaw Street that runs parallel to the iconic warehouse behind the ball park and that has the saying "From The Stoop to The Yard" along with the distance to home plate "410", as well as an area code for Maryland. Any player who hits a homerun to Eutaw Street, they receive a brass plaques that includes the player name, date of the homerun and distance. The right sleeve features a patch in dark green and orange which has the Baltimore-based company and team sponsor T. Rowe Price. The trim of the uniform is in Orioles orange is designed with brick paying tribute to the warehouse on Eutaw Street and has a jocktag on the bottom of the jersey which features a 19th century clock that reads "CHARM CITY" and "BAL", which has been a part of the ballpark above the centerfield scoreboard since the park opened April 6, 1992. The hats and batting helmets use the same colors as the uniform that has an orange "B" which is inspired by the Baltimore Baseball Club of the 1890's.
- The Reds' second City Connect uniform has a red base, features five different shades of red and continues to use the modern "C" logo but in white with black accents that is located on the chest and cap. For the first time since 2006, the entire Reds uniform will feature pinstripes in a dark red, the sleeves will be a third shade of Red but does not feature the pinstripes to pay tribute to the vest style uniforms worn from 1993–2006. The hat has the fourth shade in which the bill of the hat is a darker shade of Red different from the body of the uniform but has the updated "C" logo. The right sleeve has a patch in black and a fifth shade of Red that says "CINCY", which also has a graphic that resembles the Tyler Davidson Fountain on Fountain Square which is located in Downtown Cincinnati. The Reds will continue to use both versions of their City Connect uniforms and will alternate wearing the different versions on Friday and Saturday home games throughout the season.
- The Royals' second City Connect uniform is an all white uniform with a color gradient starting with fuchsia into the typical Royal Blue, which is a nod to the number of fountains throughout all of Kansas City. The team has nicknamed them the "Forever Fountain" uniform that celebrates the city nickname "City of Fountains". The jersey features a "R" logo on the left chest that starts in Royal Blue at the bottom and blends into fuchsia at the top, which is similar to the logo from the original 1969 team logo with a crown on top of the "R". The hat also features the same crown logo as the jersey logo and uses the same color blend from Royal Blue on the brim to fuchsia on the top of the hat. The jersey numbers are the same font as the official logo of Kansas City, along with a white line around two vertical stripes on the armbands of the jersey, symbolizing teams unique position along the state lines between Missouri and Kansas. At the bottom of the right sleeve is a heart which reflects the team being in the middle of the nations' heartland. Inside the collar of the jersey is the phrase "HEY HEY HEY HEY", which was a song famously covered by The Beatles called "Kansas City' in 1969 at Municipal Stadium and now plays after everyone Royals win at Kauffman Stadium.
- The Brewers' second City Connect uniform has a blue base that is inspired by the number of lakes, rivers and shoreline that stretches from Milwaukee River to Eagle River to Lake Mendota but also features "WISCO" across the front in script letter in partial accents of blue, cream which is the color of the sandy shores along the shoreline and sunset orange resembling the summer sunsets in the state of Wisconsin. The script lettering is a blend of script that has influence from the early 20th century American Association Milwaukee Brewers, classic supper clubs and vintage Wisconsin brewery labels. The jersey has trim in the design of Wheat and Barley braids that pays tribute to Wisconsin's agricultural roots and brewing industries across that State that is also the inspiration for the team name. The left sleeve features a patch of the old Barrelman logo in front of an outline of the State of Wisconsin using the same color outlines throughout the uniform. Inside the collar of the jersey is the inscription "Forward" which is the State motto for Wisconsin, which means to honor the past while continuing to progress forward. The bottom of the jersey features a jocktag in the shape of a fishing bobber with a baseball design resting on top of a Wisconsin Lake celebrating one of the favorite state pastimes. The hat uses the same coloring and script with a "W" in front of the Wisconsin State border.
- The Pirates' second City Connect uniform is a black base with "PIRATES" across in Gold lettering with each letter cutting off at the bottom to look like a Pirate sword and in a front that is to resemble a rugged Pirate style. The numbers and name on the back of the jersey feature the same style of font and color. The font of the uniform also resembles the design of the "Sister Bridges" including the famous Roberto Clemente Bridge which connects PNC Park with Downtown Pittsburgh. The right sleeve features a patch that is similar to the logo which was debuted in 1997 that has a Pirate logo with a red banana & black eyepatch, with the inscription "PGH" the cities abbreviation and "1887" the year the club was founded. The uniform also has accents of red that pay tribute to the red Pirate banana design on the Jolly Roger.
- The Padres' second City Connect uniform featured the city name across the chest which celebrates the binational region of "San Diego" and draws inspiration of the cities coastline and is outlined in a yellow/orange to resemble the sunsets in San Diego. The pants and hat are in a bone white, that has a trim and braid in a marigold pattern that is quintessential to Dia de los Muertos. The hat has a brim in obsidian blue with an interlocked "S" and "D" in the original Padre orange/obsidian blue, with the inner lining of the hat featuring famous San Diego landscaping in bone, marigold, aqua, fireberry and Padre gold, combing all their uniform colors into one blend. The jocktag features a papel picado resembles the team being located close to Mexico and has all the previous Padre logos and names. The right sleeve has a La Catrina patch honoring and celebrating Dia de los Muertos which is an iconic holiday heavily celebrated in San Diego in front of an Aqua blue resembling the water color of San Diego.
- The Rangers' second City Connect uniform goes back to the Rangers original color they wore during the 1980's and 90's but has not been worn since 2022, which is a shade of cochineal red, a crimson dye that comes from a crushed-up cochineal insect, which is part of Mexican culture. The team opted to use "TEJAS" across the front of the jersey with white outline, which is the Spanish word for Texas. The entire uniform uses a Charro inspired piping which is used with Mexican horsemen suits, as well as mariachi trajes and also worn by the Mariachis de los Texas Rangers. The right sleeve features a patch with papel picado, a decorative Mexican form of art used at birthdays, weddings and Dia de los Muertos by cutting colorful paper into Mexican style designs and also features the State of Texas in place of where the Flag of Texas used to be. The hat uses the same cochineal red and has a block "T" logo in white using a raised weave that is similar to the design used in Mexican artistry.

=== Anniversaries and special events ===
The 2026 season marks the 150th anniversary of the founding of the National League. Two of the eight charter members of the National League are still playing: the Atlanta Braves (formerly of Boston) and the Chicago Cubs.

This also marks the American League's 125th anniversary as a major league. Seven of the league's 15 current franchises date back to 1901.

Team	Special occasion
All teams	Jackie Robinson Day (April 15)
All teams	Pink Ribbons for breast cancer awareness (May 10, Mother's Day)
All teams	Patch for Armed Forces Day (May 16) and Camouflage caps for Armed Forces Day Weekend (May 15–17)
All teams	Poppy for Memorial Day (May 25)
All teams	No. 4 patch for Lou Gehrig Day (June 2)
All teams	"Play Ball" patch in partnership with USA Baseball and USA Softball (June 5–7)
All teams	Blue Ribbons for prostate cancer (June 21, Father's Day)
All teams	Each team will wear stars-and-stripes-themed numbers, along with matching red, white, and blue caps and socks. A special "USA 250" patch will be added to the jersey and hat (July 4)
All teams	National Baseball Hall of Fame and Museum logo patches on throwback caps (July 24-26)
All teams	Gold Ribbons for childhood cancer (September 1)
All teams	No. 21 patch for Roberto Clemente Day (September 15)
All teams	"MLB Debut" patch for players who play their first Major League game
All teams	Gold "batterman" patch for previous season's winners of the Most Valuable Player, Cy Young and Rookie of the Year awards
Arizona Diamondbacks	25th anniversary of 2001 World Series championship
Athletics	125th anniversary season (including seasons in Philadelphia, Kansas City, and Oakland)
Atlanta Braves	60th anniversary season (in Atlanta)
Atlanta Braves	No. 6 cap patch in memory of Bobby Cox (May 12 onwards)
Baltimore Orioles	60th Anniversary of 1966 World Series championship
Chicago Cubs	10th Anniversary of 2016 World Series championship
Chicago Cubs	150th anniversary season
Cincinnati Reds	50th anniversary of 1976 World Series championship
Detroit Tigers	125th anniversary season
Los Angeles Angels	"GA" patch in memory of Garret Anderson (starting April 17)
Los Angeles Dodgers	45th anniversary of 1981 World Series championship
Los Angeles Dodgers	2025 World Series championship (March 26)
Milwaukee Brewers	25th anniversary of American Family Field
Minnesota Twins	35th anniversary of 1991 World Series championship
New York Mets	40th anniversary of 1986 World Series championship
New York Mets	"DAVEY" patch in memory of Davey Johnson
New York Yankees	70th anniversary of 1956 World Series championship
New York Yankees	65th anniversary of 1961 World Series championship
New York Yankees	30th anniversary of 1996 World Series championship
New York Yankees	Microphone patch in memory of John Sterling (May 18 onwards)
Philadelphia Phillies	2026 Major League Baseball All-Star Game
Pittsburgh Pirates	25th anniversary of PNC Park
Pittsburgh Pirates	55th anniversary of 1971 World Series championship
Pittsburgh Pirates	No. 9 patch in memory of Bill Mazeroski
St. Louis Cardinals	20th anniversary of Busch Stadium
St. Louis Cardinals	20th anniversary of 2006 World Series championship
St. Louis Cardinals	15th anniversary of 2011 World Series championship
San Diego Padres	No. 35 patch in memory of Randy Jones
Seattle Mariners
Seattle Mariners	50th anniversary season
Toronto Blue Jays
Toronto Blue Jays	50th anniversary season

=== Other uniforms ===
All players. coaches and umpires wore #42 on April 15, the 79th anniversary of Jackie Robinson's debut in the majors. For the fifth consecutive year, the #42 was set in the Dodger Blue font.

As in previous years all players who were nominated for the Roberto Clemente Award for the 2026 season, past winners, players of Puerto Rican descent and all members of the Pittsburgh Pirates wore #21 on September 15.

== Media ==
=== Television ===
==== National ====
In February 2025, ESPN and MLB announced that both parties had exercised a mutual opt-out to end their media agreement following the previous 2025 season; this contract was originally going to expire after the 2028 season. In November 2025, MLB reached new, three-year agreements with ESPN, NBC Sports, and Netflix to replace ESPN's previous deal. NBC Sports will also regain the MLB Sunday Leadoff rights previously held by The Roku Channel; NBC produced those games in 2022 and 2023 before Roku took over them in 2024 and 2025.

This will also be the fifth year of the existing seven-year deals with Fox, TBS, and Apple TV.

In Canada, Blue Jays games will continue to air on Sportsnet channels in English and on TVA Sports in French.

===== Linear television =====
- Fox Sports continued to hold MLB's main television package, including 24 exclusive Saturday night Baseball Night in America windows throughout the regular season (with breaks in June and July for the 2026 FIFA World Cup on Fox, and mid-September for college football), and rights to the 2026 MLB All-Star Game.
  - FS1 additionally broadcast games on Saturday afternoons (14 games, with at least one game every week from March 28 to May 30, July 11, and from July 25 to August 22), Monday nights (17 games, with at least one game in every week from March 30 to June 8, excluding Memorial Day, and August 10, 24 and 31), Wednesday nights (two games), and Thursday nights (five games), all of which were non-exclusive and co-existed with regional broadcasts.
- TBS continued to air MLB Tuesday games throughout the regular season. Most games were blacked out in the home markets of the teams playing, but TBS was allowed to co-exist with a team's local broadcast once per-season.
- NBC Sports took over the rights to Sunday Night Baseball and MLB Sunday Leadoff from ESPN and The Roku Channel, respectively. Most Sunday Night Baseball games aired on the NBC broadcast network, with early- and late-season games airing on Peacock and NBCSN due to conflicts with Sunday Night Basketball and Sunday Night Football. NBC also aired two Opening Day games, and aired the first round of the 2026 MLB draft, the All-Star Futures Game, Sunday mid-afternoon games from August 23 to September 6, and a primetime Labor Day game.
  - "Star-Spangled Sunday" was held on July 5, in which all games played that day were exclusive to NBC Sports properties. All games streamed exclusively on Peacock, with three games simulcast by NBCSN, and the Sunday Leadoff and Sunday Night Baseball games aired on NBC. Games not on the NBC network were produced in conjunction with one of the local regional broadcasters (including NBC Sports Regional Networks and MLB Local Media), and most of them featured a mix of commentators from both teams (aside from the Blue Jays–Mariners game, which featured only the Mariners' booth, and the Red Sox–Angels game—which was produced by NESN and used the Red Sox's booth). NBC Sports Bay Area, Philadelphia, and NESN were allowed to broadcast their respective games in-market.
- ESPN exclusively broadcast 30 games, with the network's schedule beginning with a Jackie Robinson Day game before airing a doubleheader on May 7 and then a Memorial Day afternoon game. ESPN then aired weeknight games between June and September on select Mondays (nine games, at least one game every week from June 15 to August 17, excluding August 10), Wednesdays (six games, including the final two Wednesdays of the season), and Thursdays (four games, including the second-half opener on July 16), as well as three Saturday afternoon games on ABC on June 14, June 27, and August 16. The network also retained the rights to the MLB Little League Classic, which aired in place of Sunday Night Baseball on August 23.
- MLB Network continued to broadcast a regular slate of games when the other national broadcasters are not airing games. While most games will be simulcasts of the teams' local broadcast, select games were produced by the network under its MLB Network Showcase banner. All games are blacked out in the home markets of the teams playing.
- UniMás and TUDN aired the weekly Spanish-language whiparound show MLB En Vivo on Tuesday nights throughout the season, the weekly studio show MLB Esta Semana on Saturday nights, in addition to postseason coverage.

===== Streaming =====
- Apple TV continued to air Friday Night Baseball doubleheaders throughout the season.
- Peacock simulcasts all national NBC Sports games. The service also aired exclusive MLB Sunday Leadoff games from May 3 to August 30 (the July 5 game was also carried by NBC as part of aforementioned "Star-Spangled Sunday"), and exclusive Sunday Night Baseball games on March 29, April 5, and from April 19 to May 10 and May 24 due to NBA coverage; and from September 6 to September 20 due to college football and Sunday Night Football. All Peacock-exclusive were also simulcast on NBCSN. Peacock also carried supplemental programming, including a whiparound show that aired after Sunday Leadoff and on the final day of the regular season.
- ESPN Unlimited and Peacock each featured a non-exclusive "game of the day", blacked out in local markets.
- ESPN Unlimited, Fox One, and HBO Max's ad-free tiers simulcast national games shown on ESPN networks (including ABC), Fox Sports (excluding out-of-market regional Fox games), and TBS respectively.
- Netflix took over the primetime "Opening Night" game (held prior to the traditional slate of Opening Day games) and Home Run Derby from ESPN, and broadcast the MLB at Field of Dreams game.
- MLB+, rebranded this season from MLB At Bat, carried live and on-demand radio broadcasts, a live stream of MLB Network and the MLB Big Inning whiparound show, coverage of Minor League Baseball, and original programming.
- Under MLB's new contract with ESPN, MLB.tv became exclusive to the ESPN direct-to-consumer platform for new subscribers. Customers must opt-into a one-month free trial of ESPN Unlimited as part of the checkout process (although the user does not have to maintain the subscription in order to continue using MLB.tv). Existing subscriptions billed via MLB platforms and T-Mobile can also be linked into the ESPN app, and ESPN Unlimited subscribers are eligible to receive a discount on an annual subscription.; The Athletic reported in January 2026 that the changes would initially apply to MLB.tv's out-of-market services, and that its in-market regional packages were not expected to move until 2027.
- MLB Productions relaunched This Week in Baseball as a digital-exclusive series streaming weekly on MLB's X account every Friday and uploaded on demand through its YouTube channel. The new iteration consists of weekly eight-minute episodes hosted by Kait Maniscalco.

===== Postseason =====
During the postseason, NBC Sports (NBC and NBCSN, with Spanish–language simulcasts on Universo) will air all four Wild Card Series (with two series on NBC and the other two on NBCSN, one from each league). TNT Sports (TBS and truTV, with Spanish-language simulcasts on TUDN) will then broadcast the American League Division Series and the American League Championship Series, and Fox Sports (Fox and FS1, with Spanish-language simulcasts on Fox Deportes) will broadcast the National League Division Series, the National League Championship Series and the World Series. Univision will also air Game 1 of the World Series in Spanish.

===== Personnel =====
- NBC's studio team will feature Ahmed Fareed and long-time announcer Bob Costas as hosts alongside analysts Clayton Kershaw, Anthony Rizzo and Joey Votto. On March 4, NBC announced that Jason Benetti will become the lead announcer for Sunday Night Baseball, and will be paired with each local team's analyst during each broadcast. Then on March 11, NBC appointed Matt Vasgersian as the lead announcer for MLB Sunday Leadoff, and will also call NBC's Opening Day game between the Pirates and the Mets. In May, NBC added Dave Flemming, formerly of ESPN, as an alternate play-by-play announcer on MLB Sunday Leadoff.
- On July 21, ESPN announced that MLB play-by-play announcer Karl Ravech was among several personalities laid off by the network. Ravech recently served as the lead play-by-play announcer of ESPN's MLB package, and also served as host of Baseball Tonight. ESPN did allow Ravech to finish his obligations with their MLB coverage, calling a select number of games for the remainder of the season. Ravech called his final MLB game for ESPN during the Little League Classic on August 23.

==== Local ====
- While the aforementioned ESPN-MLB deal included ESPN assuming the streaming rights to MLB Local Media, these in-market feeds will not be fully integrated into the ESPN app this season and thus viewers will still need to access them directly through MLB's platforms.
- On March 3, 2025, the Orioles and Nationals reached a settlement to end the teams' dispute over television rights fee payments. MASN, which is owned and operated by the Orioles but airs both teams' games, pays rights fees to the Nationals. Through the settlement, the Nationals' agreement with the Orioles and MASN concluded following the 2025 season. On January 14, 2026, the Nationals announced that they would move to MLB Local Media. In April, the Nationals reached agreements with Fox Television Stations, Gray Media and Capitol Broadcasting to simulcast 10 games on over-the-air stations, with WTTG in Washington serving as the flagship.
- On September 8, 2025, the Mets and SNY renewed its agreement with WPIX and Nexstar Media Group to air 30 games per-season on broadcast television, including five spring training games. Outside of New York City, the games will move to Nexstar stations in Albany, Binghamton, Syracuse, Utica, and Hartford.
- Root Sports, the television home of the Mariners since 1993, announced it would shut down following the 2025 season. MLB Local Media, which produced Mariners games for Root Sports in 2025, will replace Root as the Mariners local broadcaster. The Mariners also announced an agreement with Tegna Inc. (a subsidiary of Nexstar Media Group) to air ten games over-the-air on KING-TV in Seattle, KGW in Portland, KREM in Spokane, and KTVB in Boise.
- Prior to the season, Space City Home Network, the television home of the Astros, announced the launch of SCHN+, a direct-to-consumer streaming service costing $19.99 per month or $199.99 annually. The launch means that 2026 will be the first season that every Major League Baseball team has a direct-to-consumer streaming option.
- Blue Jays television announcer Buck Martinez announced his retirement on February 6, 2026. Martinez called Blue Jays games as both a play-by-play and color commentator across two stints from 1987 to 2000, and from 2010 to 2025. He also called local television games for the Orioles from 2003 to 2009, and worked national broadcasts on ESPN and TBS, as well as global broadcasts of the World Series on MLB International. On March 14, Sportsnet announced that Joe Siddall will serve as the Blue Jays' primary television analyst, replacing Martinez.
- Marlins television analyst Tommy Hutton announced his retirement effective at the end of the 2026 season. Hutton first joined the Marlins broadcast team in 1997, and remained with the team until 2015. He rejoined the Marlins in 2018, initially as a studio analyst, before resuming as a part-time game analyst in 2022. Prior to the Marlins, Hutton also worked for the Montreal Expos, New York Yankees and Toronto Blue Jays local broadcasts starting in 1982, while also appearing nationally for ESPN, ABC and NBC.
- The Nationals promoted Dan Kolko to lead television play-by-play following the retirement of Bob Carpenter. Kolko had previously served as a host and on-field reporter while also occasionally doing play-by-play in Carpenter's absence.
- On July 15, 2026, the Rangers Sports Network announced that it would move its direct-to-consumer service from Victory+ to Bzzr effective immediately.
- On August 6, 2026, Giants television analyst Mike Krukow announced his retirement effective at the end of the season. Krukow had served as a lead analyst on Giants broadcasts starting in 1993 and was regularly paired on screen for a majority of his career with play-by-play announcer Duane Kuiper, a duo popularly known as "Kruk and Kuip". In recent years, Krukow only called home games and select remote broadcast road games after suffering from inclusion-body myositis.

===== FanDuel Sports Network teams =====
In December 2025, Main Street Sports Group, the owner of the FanDuel Sports Network (FDSN) regional sports networks, missed a scheduled payment to the St. Louis Cardinals. That same week, the Wall Street Journal reported that DAZN was in advanced talks to acquire a majority stake in Main Street. If the deal went through, DAZN and Main Street would integrate their live streaming platform in the United States and collaborate on programming. Additionally, Sports Business Journal reported that the company would be forced to dissolve operations at the end of the 2025–26 NBA and NHL regular seasons (mid-April) if the deal with DAZN did not go through by the end of January 2026. Days later, SBJ reported that talks with DAZN had stopped progressing and all MLB teams on FDSN except the Rays had not received payments on-time. On January 8, 2026, all nine MLB teams with agreements with Main Street Sports Group terminated their contracts with the company due to missed payments. SBJ reported afterwards that the company would make new offers to all teams.

On February 2, 2026, Sports Business Journal and John Ourand of Puck reported that nearly all of the teams were planning to move to MLB Local Media, but the Los Angeles Angels and Atlanta Braves were undecided and exploring in-house options:

- The Milwaukee Brewers, St. Louis Cardinals, Miami Marlins, Tampa Bay Rays, Cincinnati Reds, Kansas City Royals, and Detroit Tigers confirmed that they would move to MLB Local Media for the 2026 season.
  - Hearst Television reached a new agreement with the Tampa Bay Rays to simulcast 10 games on over-the-air stations, with WMOR-TV in Tampa serving as flagship. The agreement replaces a similar deal last year with WTOG.
  - The Tigers' agreement with MLB also includes the Detroit Red Wings of the NHL, who are also owned by the Tigers' parent company Ilitch Sports + Entertainment; unlike the Tigers, the Red Wings intend to produce their regional broadcasts in-house, but with MLB Local Media providing production support and distribution for continuity between the two co-owned teams. On March 2, it was announced that both teams' broadcasts would be carried on a joint channel known as Detroit SportsNet.
- On February 23, 2026, Sports Business Journal reported that the Atlanta Braves were considering a direct-to-distributor model for 2026, and the possibility of scaling the operation into a full-time RSN in partnership with other regional teams. On February 24, 2026, the Atlanta Braves announced a new in-house media operation known as BravesVision in partnership with Gray Media and Raycom Sports. Similarly to the Texas Rangers' Rangers Sports Network, it will distribute broadcasts to television providers within the Braves' regional footprint, and offer a direct-to-consumer streaming option via MLB.tv. The Braves also renewed its agreement with Gray Media to air games on its broadcast television stations (with WANF and WPCH-TV as flagships).
- On March 9, 2026, the Angels announced that they would acquire FanDuel Sports Network West from Main Street outright. The Angels plan to continue operating the channel as a team-owned RSN, and acquired rights to the NHL's Los Angeles Kings for at least the 2026–27 season. The Angels would rebrand their network to Angels Broadcast Television on May 1, 2026.

==== International ====
- MLB Network produces MLB Bases Covered live, which features weekly Sunday afternoon games in European friendly time slots, in addition to two postseason doubleheaders, beginning on July 26. Felix White, Melanie Newman and Xavier Scruggs call the games, which air on BBC iPLAYER, BBC Sport, and TNT Sports in the UK, Sky Italia in Italy, beIN Sports in France and the Middle East, SportDigital+ in Germany, Viaplay in Scandinavia, and ESPN in the Netherlands and Africa.
- ESPN will additionally air its slate of games in Latin America, sub-Saharan Africa, Oceania and the Netherlands, and will air games through Disney+ in select markets in Asia and Europe.
- TNT Sports will additionally air its slate of games in Puerto Rico, the United Kingdom, and Ireland.
- Fox Sports will additionally air its slate of games in Argentina, Mexico, and Puerto Rico.
- MLB Network International will air select games worldwide.

=== Radio ===
==== National ====
While ESPN's aforementioned opt-out also included ESPN Radio's national radio rights to Major League Baseball, ESPN renegotiated with the league to maintain its existing rights, including Sunday Night Baseball, the All-Star Game, and postseason games.

This will be the third season of the league's five-year deal with SiriusXM and SiriusXM Canada to simulcast all 30 teams' local regular season and postseason broadcasts.

==== Local ====
- Mariners radio announcer Rick Rizzs announced his retirement effective at the end of the 2026 season. Rizzs has been the Mariners' radio announcer starting in 1983, and besides a stint with the Tigers from 1992 to 1994, remained with the Mariners during this period.
- Mets radio announcer Howie Rose announced his retirement effective at the end of the 2026 season. Rose has been with the Mets broadcast team since 1987, beginning as a studio host on Mets radio broadcasts before moving to play-by-play on television in 1996, then on radio in 2004. Aside from the Mets, Rose also called National Hockey League games with both the New York Rangers and New York Islanders between 1989 and 2016.

== Retirements ==
The following players and coaches retired during the 2026 season and before the start of the 2027 season:

- Miguel Rojas – October 9, 2025 (announced); retired at the end of the season
- Jason Heyward – March 27
- Gio Urshela – May 18
- Chris Taylor – May 24
- Justin Verlander – July 8 (announced); retired at the end of the season
- Tim Anderson – August 10
- Trey Mancini – August 18
- Jon Berti – August 20
- Kirby Yates – September 26
- Tyler Wade – September 28
- Liam Hendriks – September 29
- Mitch Garver – October 21
- Chris Martin – November 11
- Pablo Sandoval – November 15

== Retired numbers ==
- Randy Johnson had his No. 51 retired by the Seattle Mariners on May 2. Johnson became the fourth Mariners player to have his number retired, and the second time #51 was retired by the team after Ichiro Suzuki was given the same honor the previous season.
- Evan Longoria had his No. 3 retired by the Tampa Bay Rays on July 12. This was the third number retired by the team.
- Ozzie Guillén had his No. 13 retired by the Chicago White Sox on August 8. This was the thirteenth number retired by the White Sox.
- Jeff Kent had his No. 21 retired by the San Francisco Giants on August 29. This was the twelfth number retired by the team.
- Carlos Beltrán had his No. 15 retired by the New York Mets on September 19. This was the ninth number retired by the team.
- CC Sabathia had his No. 52 retired by the New York Yankees on September 25. This was the twenty-third number retired by the team.

== See also ==
- 2026 in baseball
- 2026 Nippon Professional Baseball season
- 2026 KBO League season
