= MLB at Field of Dreams =

Special baseball event in Iowa, U.S.

Coordinates: 42.499°N 91.059°W

- Venue: Field of Dreams
- Location: Dyersville, Iowa
- Years active: 2021–2022, 2026
- Inaugurated: 2021
- Previous event: Philadelphia Phillies vs. Minnesota Twins (August 13, 2026)
- Next event: Boston Red Sox vs. Kansas City Royals (August 12, 2027)
- Organizer: Major League Baseball
- Sponsor: GEICO (2021–2022); John Deere (2026)

MLB at Field of Dreams is a recurring Major League Baseball (MLB) regular-season specialty game played in a ballpark adjacent to Field of Dreams in Dyersville, Iowa, west of Dubuque, a site popularized by the 1989 baseball film Field of Dreams. The game has been held on the second Thursday of August.

The inaugural game was held on August 12, 2021, with the Chicago White Sox defeating the New York Yankees, 9–8. The second edition was played on August 11, 2022, with the Chicago Cubs defeating the Cincinnati Reds, 4–2. The game was paused from 2023 to 2025 for renovations and expansions to the complex, and the third edition was played on August 13, 2026, with the Philadelphia Phillies defeating the Minnesota Twins, 7–1.

== Background ==
Ballpark location in eastern Iowa

The first edition of the game was planned for August 13, 2020, with the Chicago White Sox facing the New York Yankees. Due to the COVID-19 pandemic, MLB implemented a shortened 2020 season that limited games played to each team's division and the opposite league's geographically equal division to reduce travel. Hence, on July 1, MLB announced that the St. Louis Cardinals would replace the Yankees for the game. After several St. Louis players and coaches tested positive for COVID-19 in late July, MLB postponed several Cardinals games, eventually leading the league to announce on August 3 that the MLB at Field of Dreams game would be postponed to 2021. In November 2020, MLB announced the 2021 game date and that the contest would feature the originally planned participants, the White Sox and Yankees.

== Ballpark ==
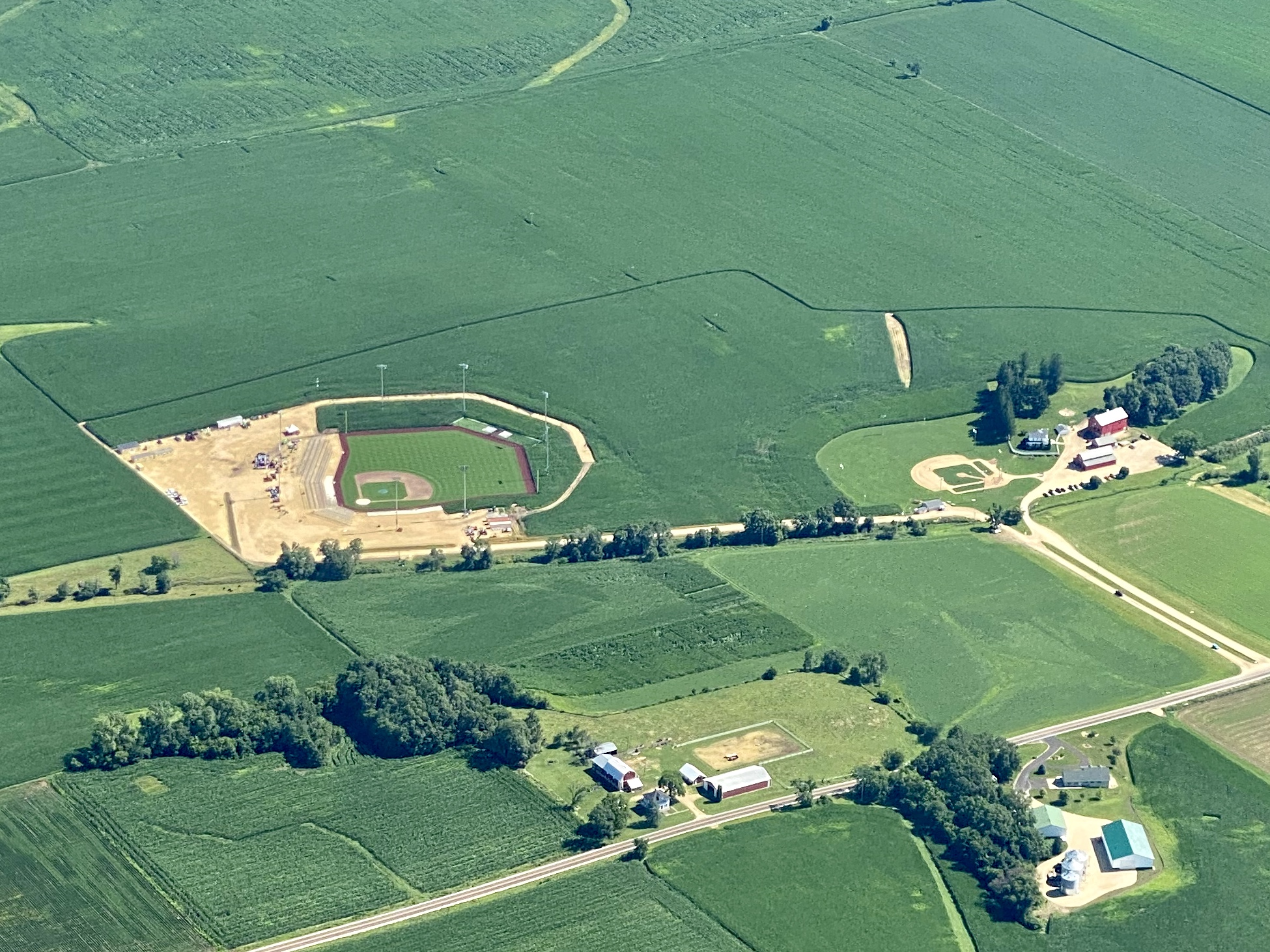
Aerial view of the MLB ballpark while under construction in 2020 (at left) and the original 1989 movie set field (at right)

The game is hosted in Dyersville, Iowa, near the filming location of the titular 1989 baseball movie. The field constructed for the movie, which has been operated as a tourist destination since 1989, could not be brought to MLB game standards without permanently altering major features of the property and destroying its movie authenticity, so it was decided to build a separate playing facility at a distance of approximately 500 ft (150 m) in the cornfields. The new field is in the property of the Ameskamp family, who used to own the left and center field of the 1988 Field of Dreams (the rest was owned by the Lansing family) before selling it to the Lansing family in 2007.

The new ballpark was designed by Vizion Projects of Des Moines, Iowa, and constructed by Gronen of Dubuque, Iowa, along with many local and regional subcontractors. This was done using a Design/Build process, which allowed design and construction to move at a speed necessary to host the 2026 MLB Game.

The design of the ballpark pays homage to the White Sox' home from 1910 to 1990, Comiskey Park, including the shape of the outfield and the bullpens beyond the center field fence. Windows were included in the design of the right field wall to show the cornfields beyond the ballpark and to provide views of the movie set.

Following postponement of the originally scheduled game, the field remained fallow during the 2020 season. During the 2021 season, many of the temporary structures that were intended for MLB at Field of Dreams were moved to Sahlen Field in Buffalo, New York, to allow that Triple-A ballpark to accommodate the Toronto Blue Jays. In late June 2021, a news report by KTIV of Sioux City, Iowa, showed that the baseball field and lights were in place for MLB at Field of Dreams, but seating had not yet been erected.

== Games ==
Season	Date	Visitor		Home team		Attendance	Ref.
2021	August 12	New York Yankees	8	Chicago White Sox	9	7,832	
2022	August 11	Chicago Cubs	4	Cincinnati Reds	2	7,823	
2026	August 13	Philadelphia Phillies	7	Minnesota Twins	1	7,163	
2027	August 12	Boston Red Sox		Kansas City Royals		TBD	

=== 2021 game ===
MLB at Field of Dreams (2021)
	1	2	3	4	5	6	7	8	9	R	H	E
New York Yankees	0	0	3	0	0	1	0	0	4	8	8	0
Chicago White Sox	1	0	4	2	0	0	0	0	2	9	8	1
- Date: August 12, 2021
- Venue: Field of Dreams
- City: Dyersville, IA
- Managers: Aaron Boone (New York Yankees); Miguel Cairo (Note: Tony La Russa did not manage the game because he was attending his brother-in-law's funeral.) (Chicago White Sox)
- Umpires: HP: Pat Hoberg; 1B: Laz Diaz; 2B: Mike Estabrook; 3B: Jeff Nelson
- Attendance: 7,832
- Time of game: 6:15 p.m. CDT
- Television: Fox
- TV announcers: Joe Buck (play-by-play); John Smoltz (analyst); Ken Rosenthal (reporter); Tom Verducci (reporter)

On August 9, it was revealed that Iowa native Pat Hoberg would be the home plate umpire for the game. The White Sox and Yankees both wore throwback uniforms resembling those worn during the 1919 season. Prior to the game, a pregame ceremony was conducted, during which Kevin Costner led players from both teams onto the field from the corn, in tribute to an iconic scene which occurs in the film while Maddie Poppe sang the national anthem. Bench coach Miguel Cairo managed the White Sox as manager Tony La Russa was unavailable due to a family funeral. This was the first MLB game played in the state of Iowa (although some consider the Keokuk Westerns, a 19th-century professional baseball team in Keokuk, Iowa, as a major league team). The game was called by Joe Buck (play by play), John Smoltz (analyst), Ken Rosenthal (field reporter), and Tom Verducci (field reporter) on Fox.

==== Recap ====
External video
- Fox's broadcast of the full ninth inning on YouTube (uploaded by Major League Baseball)

The early game was defined by strikeouts, with four from Lance Lynn and three from Andrew Heaney through the first two innings. The first scoring was a home run over the left field fence by José Abreu in the bottom of the first inning, the first ever major league home run hit in the state of Iowa. From the third inning on, the game was described as a slugfest with home runs by Aaron Judge in the top of the third, Eloy Jiménez in the bottom of the third, Seby Zavala in the bottom of the fourth, and Brett Gardner in the top of the sixth. In the game, there was eight total home runs hit into the cornfield. Heading into the ninth inning, the White Sox led 7–4. The Yankees then rallied ahead with a pair of two-out, two-run home runs by Aaron Judge, his second of the night, and Giancarlo Stanton, both off of Liam Hendriks, to put them ahead of the White Sox by one run. After a ground out by pinch hitter Danny Mendick and a walk to Seby Zavala, the game ended with a walk-off two-run homer hit by Tim Anderson off of Zack Britton, giving the White Sox the 9–8 win. The homer was the 15th walk-off home run against the Yankees in White Sox history; the first was hit by Shoeless Joe Jackson on July 20, 1919, a fictional version of whom features heavily in the Field of Dreams film.

==== Line score ====
August 12, 2021 6:15 p.m. CDT at Field of Dreams
Team	1	2	3	4	5	6	7	8	9	R	H	E
New York Yankees	0	0	3	0	0	1	0	0	4	8	8	0
Chicago White Sox	1	0	4	2	0	0	0	0	2	9	8	1
WP: Liam Hendriks (7–2) LP: Zack Britton (0–1); Home runs: NYY: Aaron Judge 2 (25), Brett Gardner (5), Giancarlo Stanton (18); CWS: José Abreu (23), Eloy Jiménez (6), Seby Zavala (4), Tim Anderson (13); Attendance: 7,832 Time: 3:29; Boxscore

=== 2022 game ===
MLB at Field of Dreams (2022)
	1	2	3	4	5	6	7	8	9	R	H	E
Chicago Cubs	3	0	0	1	0	0	0	0	0	4	10	0
Cincinnati Reds	0	0	0	0	0	0	2	0	0	2	7	1
- Date: August 11, 2022
- Venue: Field of Dreams
- City: Dyersville, IA
- Managers: David Ross (Chicago Cubs); David Bell (Cincinnati Reds)
- Umpires: HP: John Tumpane; 1B: Adrian Johnson; 2B: Marvin Hudson; 3B: Ryan Blakney
- Attendance: 7,823
- Time of game: 6:15 p.m. CDT
- Television: Fox
- TV announcers: Joe Davis (play-by-play); John Smoltz (analyst); Ken Rosenthal (reporter); Tom Verducci (reporter)

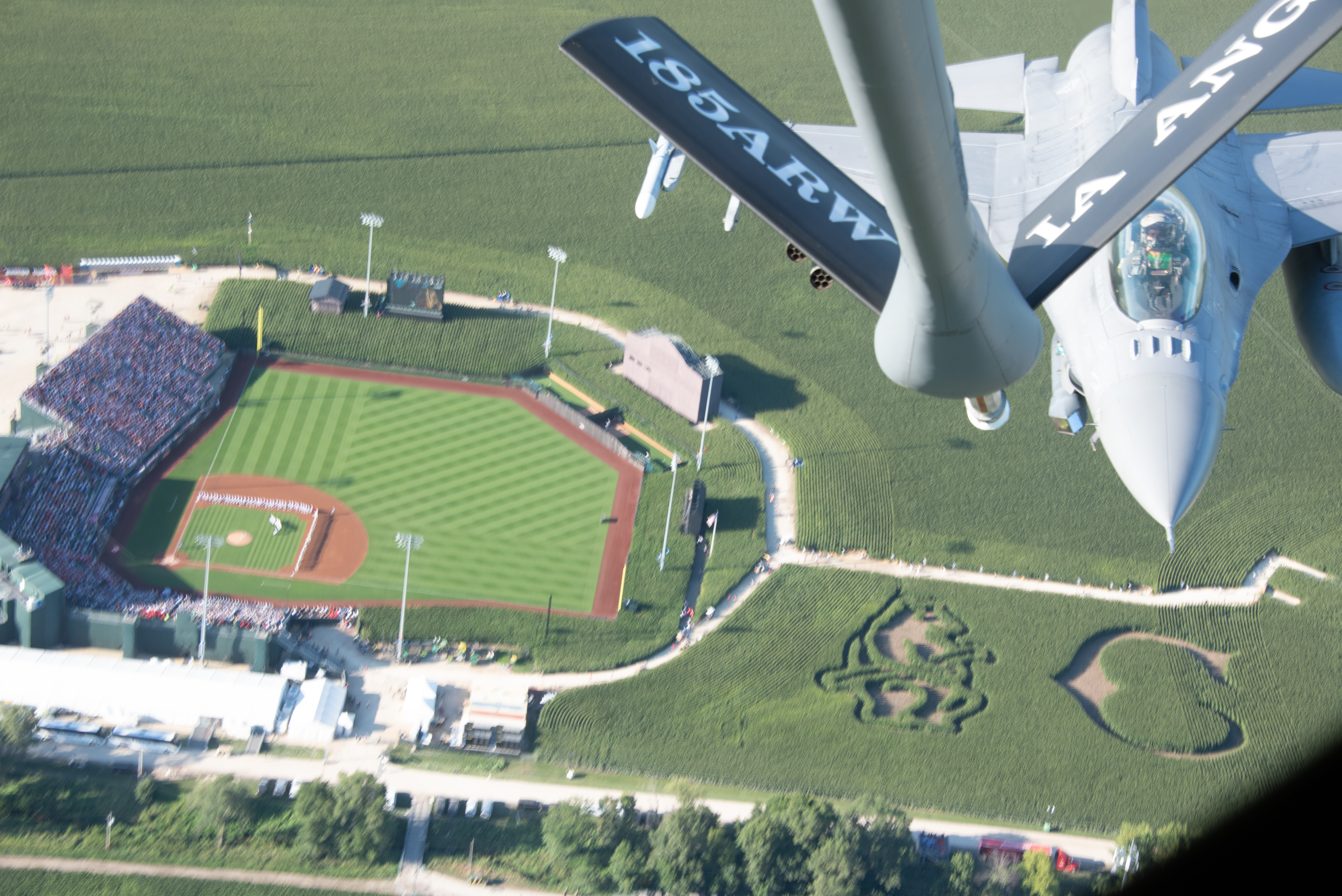
F-16 Fighting Falcon flying over the field before the 2022 game

Shortly before the 2021 game, Commissioner of Baseball Rob Manfred confirmed that there would be another game at the Field of Dreams during 2022, likely during August, but did not identify which teams would be playing. MLB later announced that the Cincinnati Reds would play the Chicago Cubs at the site on August 11, 2022, with Cincinnati as the designated home team in the game. Retro-style uniforms for the teams were revealed on August 8, with the Reds' uniforms matching what the team wore in the 1919 World Series. Pre-game ceremonies began with Ken Griffey Sr. and Ken Griffey Jr. playing catch, followed by the Cubs and Reds walking in from the cornfield beyond centerfield along with multiple members of the National Baseball Hall of Fame—Johnny Bench, Andre Dawson, Ferguson Jenkins, Barry Larkin, Ryne Sandberg, and Billy Williams—and a ceremonial first pitch from Jenkins to Bench. The national anthem was sung by country singer Jessie James Decker. John Smoltz (analyst), Ken Rosenthal (field reporter), and Tom Verducci (field reporter) return to call the game with Joe Davis (play-by-play) calling now as the lead announcer for Fox.

==== Recap ====
Drew Smyly recorded the pitching victory for the Cubs, lasting five innings with nine strikeouts and four hits allowed. The Reds only mustered two runs, in the bottom of the seventh inning, all while having two runners on base in three separate innings and with a total of eight runners left on base. Cincinnati second baseman Jonathan India left the contest after the third inning, due to a contusion on his left leg from being hit by a pitch in the first inning; his injury later required an emergency helicopter flight to an Iowa City hospital. Chicago catcher Willson Contreras rolled his ankle rounding second base in the third inning, but remained in the game.

==== Line score ====
August 11, 2022 7:15 p.m. EST at Field of Dreams 77 °F (25 °C), clear
Team	1	2	3	4	5	6	7	8	9	R	H	E
Chicago Cubs	3	0	0	1	0	0	0	0	0	4	10	0
Cincinnati Reds	0	0	0	0	0	0	2	0	0	2	7	1
WP: Drew Smyly (5–6) LP: Nick Lodolo (3–3) Sv: Rowan Wick (7); Attendance: 7,823 Time: 3:21; Boxscore

=== 2026 game ===
MLB at Field of Dreams (2026)
	1	2	3	4	5	6	7	8	9	R	H	E
Philadelphia Phillies	2	0	0	3	0	0	2	0	0	7	12	0
Minnesota Twins	0	1	0	0	0	0	0	0	0	1	8	0
- Date: August 13, 2026
- Venue: Field of Dreams
- City: Dyersville, IA
- Managers: Don Mattingly (interim) (Philadelphia Phillies); Derek Shelton (Minnesota Twins)
- Umpires: HP: Bruce Dreckman; 1B: Alex Tosi; 2B: Cory Blaser; 3B: Jansen Visconti
- Attendance: 7,163
- Time of game: 6:30 p.m. CDT
- Television: Netflix
- TV announcers: Matt Vasgersian (play-by-play); Hunter Pence (analyst); CC Sabathia (analyst); Lauren Shehadi (reporter)

After the 2022 game, the Field of Dreams complex underwent a multi-year renovation and expansion. On November 19, 2025, MLB announced the Field of Dreams game would return for the 2026 season, this time featuring the Minnesota Twins and the Philadelphia Phillies, with the Twins as the designated home team. Both teams' throwback uniforms were unveiled on July 20, with the Twins wearing their original home uniforms from their start in 1961, and the Phillies wearing uniforms inspired by their road grays from 1939. Pre-game ceremonies included members of both teams emerging from the cornfields, followed by several members of the National Baseball Hall of Fame. The national anthem was performed by country singer Alana Springsteen. As part of a new media rights deal, Netflix became the broadcaster for the game. Matt Vasgersian (play-by-play), Hunter Pence (analyst), CC Sabathia (analyst), and Lauren Shehadi (field reporter) served on the call.

==== Recap ====
The game began with a leadoff home run by Kyle Schwarber, and a later RBI single by Bryson Stott gave the Phillies a 2–0 lead by the end of the top of the first inning. Luke Keaschall responded for the Twins with a solo home run in the second inning, but a second home run by Schwarber in the fourth inning and a two-run home run by Brandon Marsh in the seventh inning allowed the Phillies to secure a 7–1 victory.

==== Line score ====
August 13, 2026 7:30 p.m. EST at Field of Dreams 72 °F (22 °C), partly cloudy
Team	1	2	3	4	5	6	7	8	9	R	H	E
Philadelphia Phillies	2	0	0	3	0	0	2	0	0	7	12	0
Minnesota Twins	0	1	0	0	0	0	0	0	0	1	8	0
WP: Aaron Nola (4–9) LP: Taj Bradley (9–5); Home runs: PHI: Kyle Schwarber 2 (37), Brandon Marsh (17); MIN: Luke Keaschall (7); Attendance: 7,163 Time: 2:52; Boxscore

=== MiLB at Field of Dreams ===
==== 2022 game ====
MiLB at Field of Dreams
	1	2	3	4	5	6	7	8	9	R	H	E
Cedar Rapids Kernels (Note: Playing as the Cedar Rapids Bunnies)	0	0	0	0	0	0	2	0	0	2	7	1
Quad Cities River Bandits (Note: Playing as the Davenport Blue Sox)	2	0	3	0	0	2	0	0	×	7	8	0
- Date: August 9, 2022
- Venue: Field of Dreams
- City: Dyersville, IA
- Managers: Brian Dinkelman (Cedar Rapids Kernels (Note: Playing as the Cedar Rapids Bunnies)); Brooks Conrad (Quad Cities River Bandits (Note: Playing as the Davenport Blue Sox))
- Time of game: 6:00 p.m. CDT
- Television: MLB Network
- TV announcers: Greg Amsinger (play-by-play); Harold Reynolds (analyst); Jon Morosi (reporter)

On April 21, 2022, Minor League Baseball (MiLB) announced the inaugural MiLB at Field of Dreams game, a High-A contest in Dyersville between teams of the Midwest League. On August 9, the Quad Cities River Bandits hosted and defeated the Cedar Rapids Kernels, 7–2. The teams used historical franchise names for the contest, Davenport Blue Sox and Cedar Rapids Bunnies, respectively.

==== 2026 game ====
MiLB at Field of Dreams
	1	2	3	4	5	6	7	8	9	R	H	E
St. Paul Saints	1	0	0	0	1	0	1	0	0	3	5	0
Iowa Cubs	0	0	1	0	5	0	0	0	×	6	7	2
- Date: August 11, 2026
- Venue: Field of Dreams
- City: Dyersville, IA
- Managers: Brian Dinkelman (St. Paul Saints); Marty Pevey (Iowa Cubs)
- Umpires: HP: Charlie Welling; 1B: Kellen Martin; 2B: Dereck Pacheco; 3B: Nathan Diederich
- Attendance: 7,096
- Time of game: 6:35 p.m. CDT
- Television: MLB Network
- TV announcers: Greg Amsinger (play-by-play); Harold Reynolds (analyst); Jon Morosi (reporter)

The game returned in 2026, when the Iowa Cubs defeated the St. Paul Saints 6–3.

== Reception ==
Fans and media personalities alike responded positively to the presentation of the inaugural 2021 game, which drew the highest ratings for a regular-season telecast on Fox at 5.9 million viewers since a Red Sox–Yankees contest on October 1, 2005. Len Kasper, who called the game on radio for the White Sox, commented that "I'm not really sure MLB could have done an event better than the Field of Dreams Game. Yes, the game was bonkers and the finish was Oscar worthy, but the entire thing—the scenery, the park, the weather, the people involved, the vibe—it was just perfect. Unforgettable experience."

== Future ==
The 2027 MLB at Field of Dreams game is scheduled for August 12, with the Kansas City Royals hosting the Boston Red Sox. Like the rest of the 2027 MLB season, the game is contingent on MLB and the Major League Baseball Players Association (MLBPA) signing a new collective bargaining agreement (CBA) to replace that one that expires on December 1, 2026.

== Broadcasting ==
Both the 2021 and 2022 games were broadcast by Fox as part of their Thursday Night Baseball telecasts. Under their 2026–28 contracts to broadcast a yearly special event game, Netflix aired the 2026 Field of Dreams game and NBC was assigned the 2027 game.

Season	Network	Play-by-play	Analyst(s)	Field reporter(s)	Ref.
2021	Fox	Joe Buck	John Smoltz	Ken Rosenthal; Tom Verducci	
2022	Fox	Joe Davis	John Smoltz	Ken Rosenthal; Tom Verducci	
2026	Netflix	Matt Vasgersian	Hunter Pence; CC Sabathia	Lauren Shehadi	
2027	NBC				

== See also ==
- Denise Stillman, who established Go the Distance Baseball
- List of neutral site regular season Major League Baseball games played in the United States and Canada
- NHL Winter Classic
