= Flexible scheduling (sports) =

Flexible scheduling or flexing is a practice in the scheduling and broadcasting of sports events, in which a league and its broadcaster reserve the right to reschedule specific matches so that they can be aired in a different time slot. The practice is often used in flagship "game of the week" packages, where a game determined prior to the season may be replaced with one having greater importance in order to improve viewership.

== Use cases ==
=== National Football League ===
The term was popularized in the National Football League, which introduced flexible scheduling in the 2006 season as part of the acquisition of its flagship prime time package by NBC. During the last seven weeks of the season, the league and NBC received the ability to reschedule selected Sunday afternoon games to air on Sunday Night Football instead, with the originally scheduled game moved back to an afternoon window. NBC would be able to flex games up to 12 days in advance. CBS and Fox—who hold the rights to Sunday afternoon games—would each be able to protect up to five games per-season from being flexed.

An executive noted that the provision was likely intended to justify the increased value of NBC's contract in comparison to prior rightsholder ABC Sports (which had aired the package on Monday nights for several decades), as it prevents the network from being "stuck" with games that do not prove to be as significant as anticipated when the schedule was originally determined (such as games featuring poorly performing teams or reduced playoff implications).

In 2014, flexible scheduling was extended to Week 5, but with the caveat that only two games can be flexed per-season between Weeks 5 through 10. In addition, the NFL enabled the possibility for Sunday games to be "cross-flexed" between CBS and Fox (which normally air Sunday games from the AFC and NFC conferences respectively) to allow the quality of their respective slates of regional games to be more balanced.

Under new contracts in the 2023 season, flexible scheduling was extended to all NFL prime time packages:

- Sunday Night Football allows up to three games to be flexed between Weeks 5 and 14, and any game thereafter from Week 14 onward. Flexing requires a 6-day notice.
- Monday Night Football allows any game to be flexed from Week 12 onward, with a 12-day notice.
- Thursday Night Football allows up to two games to be flexed per-season from Week 13 onward, with a 28-day notice. Teams can only be flexed to Thursday Night Football once per-season, cannot play two consecutive Thursday-night games in a row, and cannot appear on Thursday Night Football more than twice per-season.
- CBS and Fox can each protect one game per-week from being flexed in any form.

Special cases exist for the final two weeks of the season: Week 17 features a Saturday doubleheader whose games are not determined until the week prior. In Week 18, games do not receive time slots or network assignments until after the conclusion of Week 17, so that the national windows can feature games with the strongest playoff implications.

=== National Basketball Association ===
Flexible scheduling was first introduced to the NBA on ESPN and NBA on ABC beginning in the 2005–06 season. It has since become a component of the NBA's national schedule for all broadcasters.

The NBA has encouraged its international rightsholders to use a similar practice in order to help prioritize the broadcast of games involving players of local interest.
