= Sprint (TV series) =

Documentary television series

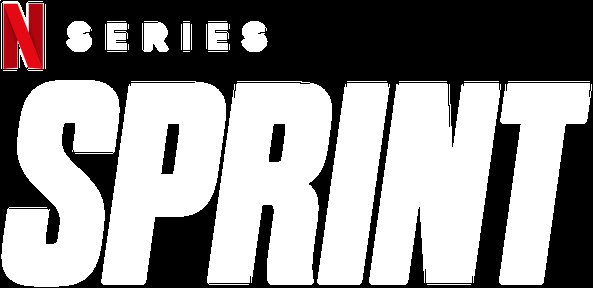
- Genre: Docudrama
- Created by: World Athletics; Netflix
- Original language: English
- No. of seasons: 2
- No. of episodes: 10

Production
- Executive producers: James Gay-Rees; Paul Martin
- Running time: 33-48 minutes
- Production company: Box to Box Films

Original release
- Network: Netflix
- Release: 2 July 2024 – present

Sprint is a television documentary series produced in a collaboration between Netflix and World Athletics, to give a behind-the-scenes look at the athletes and races of the Diamond League, World Athletics Championships, and Olympic Games. The series debuted with six episodes on 2 July 2024 covering the 2023 Diamond League and 2023 World Athletics Championships. The series was renewed for a second season which covered athletics at the 2024 Summer Olympics, released on 13 November 2024.

== Production and concept ==
The series was produced by Box to Box Films, the same organization that produced the popular Formula 1: Drive to Survive series since 2019.

== Cast ==
=== Sprinters ===
==== Main cast ====
Season 1 (S1) and season 2 (S2) appearances are denoted.

- Shelly-Ann Fraser-Pryce (S1, S2)
- Zharnel Hughes (S1)
- Shericka Jackson (S1, S2)
- Marcell Jacobs (S1, S2)
- Fred Kerley (S1, S2)
- Noah Lyles (S1, S2)
- Sha'Carri Richardson (S1, S2)
- Gabby Thomas (S1, S2)
- Elaine Thompson-Herah (S1)
- Kishane Thompson (S2)
- Oblique Seville (S2)
- Kenny Bednarek (S2)
- Christian Coleman (S2)
- Letsile Tebogo (S2)
- Twanisha Terry (S2)
- Melissa Jefferson (S2)
- Julien Alfred (S2)

==== Secondary cast ====
- Ferdinand Omanyala
- Junelle Bromfield
- Twanisha Terry
- Christian Coleman

=== Personnel ===
- Keisha Caine (mother of Noah Lyles)
- Lance Brauman (coach of Noah Lyles)
- Nicole Daza (wife of Marcell Jacobs)
- Paolo Camossi (coach of Marcell Jacobs)
- Dennis Mitchell (coach of Star Athletics)
- Paul Francis (coach of MVP Track Club)
- Stephen Francis (coach of MVP Track Club)
- Linford Christie (former British 100 m record-holder)
- Shenel Francis (girlfriend of Zharnel Hughes)

=== Pundits ===
- Usain Bolt
- Allyson Felix
- Ato Boldon
- Michael Johnson

== Episode lists ==
Series	Episodes	Originally released
1	6	2 July 2024
2	4	13 November 2024

=== Season 1 (2024) ===
No. overall	No. in season	Title	Original release date
1	1	"Heir to the Throne"	2 July 2024
Noah Lyles challenges Marcell Jacobs at the 2023 Meeting de Paris.
2	2	"Queens"	2 July 2024
Sha'Carri Richardson and Shericka Jackson race at the 2023 Kamila Skolimowska Memorial.
3	3	"Belonging"	2 July 2024
Lyles races Zharnel Hughes at the 2023 London Athletics Meet.
4	4	"Trials & Tribulations"	2 July 2024
Sprinters qualify for world teams at the 2023 USA Outdoor Track and Field Championships and the 2023 Jamaican Athletics Championships.
5	5	"The Gold Standard"	2 July 2024
The series follows the 2023 Worlds men's 100 m semi-finals and women's 100 m finals.
6	6	"The Double is Alive"	2 July 2024
Season 1 ends with the 2023 Worlds men's 100 m finals and both the men's and women's 200 m finals.

=== Season 2 ===
No. overall	No. in season	Title	Original release date
7	1	"All American"	13 November 2024
Noah Lyles and Fred Kerley race at the 2024 United States Olympic trials. Kerley also competes at the 2024 USATF NYC Grand Prix.
8	2	"Changing of the Guard"	13 November 2024
Oblique Seville beats Lyles at the Racers Grand Prix, then Kishane Thompson, Seville, Shelly-Ann Fraser Pryce, and Shericka Jackson race at the 2024 Jamaican Athletics Championships. At the end of the episode, Julien Alfred and Gabrielle Thomas race at the 2024 London Athletics Meet.
9	3	"Going for Gold: Part 1"	13 November 2024
10	4	"Going for Gold: Part 2"	13 November 2024

== Reception ==
Cathal Dennehy of Athletics Weekly wrote that the series would be good for the sport of athletics, but not to expect the same level of interest that Formula 1: Drive to Survive generated.

Noah Lyles' portrayal in the documentary received criticism, with some accusing the documentary makers of focusing too much on Lyles at the expense of other athletes. Some also argued that Lyles appeared arrogant and "not likable at all".

== See also ==
- I Am Bolt
