= Golden Reel Award for Outstanding Achievement in Sound Editing – Sound Effects, Foley, Music, Dialogue and ADR for Non-Theatrical Documentary Broadcast Media =

Award given by the Motion Picture Sound Editors

- Country: United States
- Presented by: Motion Picture Sound Editors
- Currently held by: Brent Burge, Martin Kwok, Matt Stutter, Buster Flaws, Melanie Graham, Emile De La Rey, Steve Gallagher, Tane Upjohn-Beatson, Michael Donaldson, Simon Riley – The Beatles: Get Back (2021)

The Golden Reel Award for Outstanding Achievement in Sound Editing – Sound Effects and Foley for Non-Theatrical Documentary Broadcast Media is an annual award given by the Motion Picture Sound Editors. It honors sound editors whose work has warranted merit in the field of television; in this case, their work in the field of sound effects and foley work in non-theatrical documentary broadcast media.

The category was first presented as two different categories, Best Sound Editing - Long Form Documentary (2010–2016) and Best Sound Editing - Short Form Documentary (2011–2016), the two categories were renamed in 2014 to Best Sound Editing - Long Form Sound Effects, Foley, Dialogue and ADR in Television Documentary and Best Sound Editing - Short Form Sound Effects, Foley, Dialogue and ADR in Television Documentary, respectively. In 2017, the categories were merged into the current category.

== Winners and nominees ==
=== 2010s ===
Best Sound Editing - Long Form Documentary

Year	Program	Episode(s)	Nominees	Network
2010	A Man Created Dog		Michael Payne (supervising sound editor), Patrick Cusack (supervising foley editor, foley artist), John C. Stuver (supervising dialogue editor), John DeFaria (music editor)	Nat Geo
2010	30 for 30	"The Two Escobars"	Paul Bercovitch (supervising sound editor, dialogue editor), Ethan Beigel (sound designer), Matt Lewkowicz (sound effects editor)	ESPN
2010	For Love of Liberty: The Story of America's Black Patriots		Jack Sherman (supervising sound editor, supervising dialogue editor, sound effects editor), David Michael Erwin (sound designer), Larry Brown (music editor)	PBS
2011	Gettysburg		Brent Kiser (sound effects editor), Zach Seivers (supervising sound editor), Rodrigo Ortiz-Parraga (supervising foley editor), Charles Maynes, Justin M. Davey, John Maynard (sound effects editors)	History
2011	Harlistas: An American Journey		Trip Brock (supervising sound editor), Peter D. Lago (supervising sound editor/foley artist), Alex Menck (music editor), Steven Avila, Alexander Pugh (sound effects editors), Brian S.M. Wroth (dialogue editor), Ben Whitver (adr editor)	MUN2
2011	Koran by Heart		Trip Brock (supervising sound editor), Tara Blume (foley artist), Steven Avila, Alexander Pugh (sound effects editors), Peter D. Lago, Greg Mauer (foley editors), Brian S.M. Wroth (dialogue editor), Ben Whitver (adr editor)	HBO
2012	Crossfire Hurricane		Cameron Frankley (supervising sound editor), Jason W. Jennings (sound designer), Jon Michaels (music editor)	HBO
2012	Love Hate Love		Eric Lalicata (supervising sound editor)	KTF Films
2012	The Interrupters		Drew Weir (supervising sound editor), Martin Stebbing (editor)	PBS
2013	Deadliest Catch	"The Final Battle"	Bob Bronow (supervising sound editor, sound designer), Kevin Skaggs (sound effects editor), Jason Tuttle (dialogue/adr editor)	Discovery Channel
2013	30 for 30	"Big Shot"	Eric Lalicata, Marcus Pardo (supervising sound editors), Isai Espinoza (supervising dialogue editor), Russ Montgomery (sound editor)	ESPN
2013	Manhunt: The Search for Bin Laden		Trip Brock, Steven Avila (supervising sound editors), Matt Salib (foley artist), Peter D. Lago, Alexander Pugh (sound effects editors), Ian Shedd (dialogue/adr editor), Ben Whitver (dialogue/adr editor), Joe Bini (music editor)	HBO

Best Sound Editing - Short Form Documentary

Year	Program	Episode(s)	Nominees	Network
2011	Man Made	"Bugatti Super Car"	Joe Pizzulo (supervising sound editor), Mark Mercado (supervising dialogue/adr editor), Peter Karr (music editor)	Nat Geo
2011	Above the Ashes		David Bondelevitch (supervising sound editor), Brandon Vaccaro, Michelle Carpenter (music editors), Alex Layne (sound effects editor)	KBDI-TV
2011	Year of the Quarterback	"Tim Tebow: Everything In Between"	Tim Alward (supervising sound editor/sound designer), Michael Orlowski (supervising sound editor), Tom Carrigan III (supervising dialogue/adr editor), Chase Heavener (music editor)	ESPN
2012	Not awarded			
2013	North America	"No Place to Hide"	Kate Hopkins, Tim Owens (supervising sound editors), Stephen Griffiths (sound effects editor), Owen Peters (assistant dialogue editor), Michael Baber (music editor)	Discovery Channel
2013	30 Days in May		Kelly Vandever (supervising sound editor), Steven Avila, Alexander Pugh (sound effects editors)	Showtime
2013	Through the Wormhole	"Do We Have Free Will?"	Eric Raber (supervising sound editor), Jonathan Coomes (sound effects editor), Paul Hammond (dialogue and adr editor)	Science Channel

Best Sound Editing - Long Form Sound Effects, Foley, Dialogue and ADR in Television Documentary

Year	Program	Episode(s)	Nominees	Network
2014	Foo Fighters: Sonic Highways	"Seattle"	Eddie Kim (supervising sound editor, sound designer, supervising dialogue editor, sound effects editor), Jeffrey Fuller (supervising dialogue editor, supervising adr editor, supervising music editor), Justin Lebens (sound effects editor, dialogue editor, adr editor)	HBO
2014	Deadliest Catch	"You'll Know My Name is the Lord..."	Bob Bronow (supervising sound editor, sound designer), Doug Kern (supervising dialogue editor, supervising adr editor), Eddie Rodriguez (sound effects editor), Selina Zakaria (music editor)	Discovery Channel
2014	The World Wars	"Trial by Fire"	Tim W. Kelly (supervising sound editor), Jonathan Soule, Brian McAllister (sound designers), John Kilgour, Mike Alfin (music editors)	History
2015	Spymasters: CIA in the Crosshairs		Jason Schmidt, Mead Stone (supervising sound editors), Gary Winter (sound designer)	Showtime
2015	30 for 30	"Sole Man"	Eric Lalicata, Marcus Pardo (supervising sound editors)	ESPN
2015	Keith Richards: Under the Influence		Brian Chumney (supervising sound editor), Al Nelson (sound designer)	Netflix
2016	My Beautiful Broken Brain		Nick Ryan (supervising sound editor), Claire Ellis (dialogue editor), Tom Foster (sound effects editor)	Netflix
2016	Mapplethorpe: Look at the Pictures		Paulette Victor-Lifton (supervising sound editor), Scott Brewster, Gary Coppola (dialogue editors), Nathan Ashton (foley editor, foley artist), Mark Allen (sound effects editor), Chase Elkins (music editor)	HBO
2016	I'll Sleep When I'm Dead		Joe Dzuban (supervising sound editor), Justin Dzuban (dialogue editor), Justin Krook, Pernell L. Salinas (sound effects editors)	Netflix
2016	Team Foxcatcher		Nicholas Montgomery, Tom Efinger (supervising sound editors), Jeff Seelye (dialogue editor), Suzana Peric (music editor)	Netflix
2016	Searching for Home: Coming Back from War		Paulette Victor-Lifton (supervising sound editor), Gary Coppola, James Gallivan (dialogue editors), Jamison Rabbe (adr editor), Paul Mason, Gabriel Aronson (sound effects editors)	

Best Sound Editing - Short Form Sound Effects, Foley, Dialogue and ADR in Television Documentary

Year	Program	Episode(s)	Nominees	Network
2014	Ax Men	"Ax Marks the Spot"	Bob Bronow (supervising sound editor, sound designer), Doug Kern (supervising dialogue editor), Eddie Rodriguez (sound effects editor)	History
2014	Undrafted	"Episode 105"	Eric Lalicata, Shaun Cunningham (supervising sound editors)	NFL Network
2014	Unsung Heroes: The Story of America's Female Patriots		Jack Sherman (supervising sound editor, supervising dialogue editor, sound effects editor, dialogue editor, adr editor), Larry Brown (supervising music editor)	PBS
2015	India's Daughter		Resul Pookutty (supervising sound editor, sound designer, supervising dialogue/adr editor), Amrit Pritam Dutta (supervising sound editor, sound designer), Vijay Kumar (supervising foley editor, sound effects editor), Karnail Singh, Sajjan Choudhary (foley artists), Sampath Alwar (sound effects editor, dialogue/adr editor), Krsna Solo (music editor)	BBC
2015	Brewmore		Matt Davies (sound designer, foley artist, sound effects editor), Kevin Hill (dialogue/adr editor)	
2015	Chef's Table		William McGuigan (supervising sound editor)	Netflix
2015	Deadliest Catch		Bob Bronow (supervising sound editor, sound designer), Noelle DiMarco (dialogue/adr editor), Laurence A. Ellis (music editor)	Discovery Channel
2015	Undrafted		Eric Lalicata (supervising sound editor)	NFL Network
2015	Undrafted		Shaun Cunningham (supervising sound editor)	NFL Network
2016	Sonic Sea		Trevor Gates (supervising sound editor), Ryan Briley (dialogue editor), Ron Aston, Christopher Bonis (sound effects editors)	Discovery Channel
2016	We Will Rise: Michelle Obama's Mission to Educate Girls Around the World		Rich Cutler (supervising sound editor), Oliver Lief (music editor)	CNN
2016	Captive	"Prison Riot, U.S.A."	Claire Ellis (dialogue editor), Kim Tae Hak (sound effects editor)	Netflix
2016	Chef's Table	"Alex Atala"	William McGuigan (supervising sound editor), Nikola Simikic (sound effects editor)	Netflix
2016	Last Chance U	"Blood Makes the Grass Grow"	Pete Nichols (supervising sound editor), Graham Barclay, Aaron Cross (dialogue editors), Jason Coleman (foley editor, foley artist), Barry S. Weir Jr. (sound designer)	Netflix
2016	The White Helmets		Claire Ellis (dialogue editor), Tom Foster (sound effects editor)	Netflix

Outstanding Achievement in Sound Editing - Sound Effects, Foley, Music, Dialogue and ADR for Non-Theatrical Documentary Broadcast Media

Year	Program	Episode(s)	Nominees	Network
2017	Becoming Bond		Trip Brock (supervising sound editor), Raymond Park, Zheng Jia, K. Joshua Fernberg, G.W. Pope III (sound effects editors), Bruce Stubblefield (supervising dialogue editor), Alexander Jongbloed, Alex Johnson (foley editors), Lorita de la Cerna (foley artist)	Hulu
2017	Breaking the Day		Suat Onur Ayas (supervising sound editor, sound designer), Justin Stark (dialogue editor)	Red Bull TV
2017	decanted.		Matt Davies (supervising sound editor), Kevin Hill (dialogue lead), Rich Bussey (sound effects editor)	Netflix
2017	Shot in the Dark		Suat Onur Ayas (supervising sound editor, sound designer, music editor), Justin Stark (dialogue editor)	Netflix
2017	Motivation 3: The Next Generation		Shaun Cunningham (supervising sound editor, sound effects editor), April Tucker (sound designer, dialog editor)	The Orchard
2017	The New Radical		April Tucker (music editor, dialog editor), Amy Barber, Jonathan Bruce (sound effects editors), Shaun Cunningham (sound supervisor)	The Orchard
2017	The Defiant Ones		Jay Nierenberg (supervising sound editor), Del Spiva (supervising music editor), Todd Niesen (dialogue editor), David Mann, Charles Maynes, Brent Findley, Steven Iba (sound effects editors), Katrina Frederick (foley editor), Nicholas Fitzgerald (music editor), Chris Terhune (sound designer), Brandon Sanchez (foley artist)	HBO
2018	Searching for Sound: Islandman and VeYasin		Suat Onur Ayas (supervising sound editor), Justin Stark (dialogue lead), Tolga Boyuk, Emin Yasin Vural (sound effects editors), Okan Isik (dialogue editor)	Red Bull TV
2018	Bobby Kennedy for President	"I'd Like to Serve"	Christopher Barnett (supervising sound editor), Steve Bissinger (sound effects editor), Paul Brill (music editor)	Netflix
2018	Medal of Honor		Jamey Scott (supervising sound editor, sound effects editor), Nicholas Fitzgerald (music editor)	Netflix
2018	The Zen Diaries of Garry Shandling		Bobby Mackston (supervising sound editor), Matt Temple, Adam Parrish King (sound effects editors), Alexander Thompson (music editor)	HBO
2018	Operation Odessa		Bruce Greenspan, Trip Brock (supervising sound editors), Natalia Saavedra Brychcy, K. Joshua Fernberg, G.W. Pope III (sound effects editors), Bruce Stubblefield (dialogue editor), Jacob Ortiz (adr editor)	Showtime
2018	All or Nothing: The Michigan Wolverines	""Be the Game Changer"	Scott Perry (supervising sound editor), Jason Vitaris (sound designer)	Amazon
2018	The Gymkhana Files	"Where It All Began"	Ugo Derouard (supervising sound editor), Preston Edmondson (supervising dialogue editor), Randy Torres (sound designer, sound effects editor), Justin M. Green (sound effects editor), Rian Balvin (dialogue editor)	Amazon
2018	Watergate		Keith Hodne (supervising sound editor)	BBC Two, Discovery Channel
2019	Serengeti		Paul Cowgill (supervising sound editor), Peter Davies (foley editor), Alessandro Baldessari (music editor), Paul Ackerman (foley artist)	Discovery Channel
2019	Apollo: Missions to the Moon		John Warrin (supervising sound editor), Nick Pavey (dialogue editor), Christopher Pentecost, Brian Golub, Leandro Cassan (sound effects editors)	Nat Geo
2019	Hostile Planet	"Oceans"	Kate Hopkins, Tim Owens (supervising sound editors), Jonny Crew, Hannah Gregory, Ben Peace (sound effects editors), Tom Mercer (foley editor), Ben Jones (foley artist)	Nat Geo
2019	What's My Name: Muhammad Ali		Mandell Winter, David Esparza (supervising sound editors), Sang Jun Kim, Micah Loken (dialogue editors), Ryan Collins, Ando Johnson (sound effects editors)	HBO
2019	The Cornell Lab of Ornithology: Bird of Prey		Nicholas Renbeck (supervising sound editor), Branka Mrkic (dialogue editor), George A. Lara, Dow McKeever (foley editors), Marko A. Costanzo (foley artist)	
2019	Our Planet	"One Planet"	Kate Hopkins, Tim Owens (sound effects editors)	Netflix
2019	Epic Yellowstone		Brian Eimer (sound designer), Michael Bonini, Robynne Trueman (sound effects editors), Michael Le (foley editor), Guy Francoeur (foley artist)	Smithsonian Channel
2019	This Is Football		Greg Gettens (supervising sound editor), Chad Orororo (sound effects editor), Ciaran Smith, Philip Moroz (foley editors), Paula Boram (foley artist)	Amazon

=== 2020s ===
Year	Program	Episode(s)	Nominees	Network
2020	Laurel Canyon: A Place in Time	"Episode 1"	Jonathan Greber (supervising sound editor), Lucas Miller (sound effects editor)	Epix, Amblin
2020	Be Water		Nas Parkash (supervising sound editor)	ESPN
2020	Beastie Boys Story		Martyn Zub (supervising sound editor), Paul Aulicino (sound effects editors)	Apple TV+
2020	Bruce Springsteen’s Letter to You		Steve Urban (supervising sound editor), Brandon Duncan (music editor)	Apple TV+
2020	High Score	"Boom & Bust"	Keith Hodne (supervising sound editor)	Netflix
2020	Jeffrey Epstein: Filthy Rich	"The Island"	R. Hollis Smith (supervising sound editor)	Netflix
2020	The Last Dance	"Episode 1"	Keith Hodne (supervising sound editor)	Netflix
2021	The Beatles: Get Back	"Part 3"	Brent Burge, Martin Kwok (supervising sound editors); Matt Stutter, Buster Flaws, Melanie Graham (sound editors); Emile De La Rey (dialogue editor); Steve Gallagher, Tane Upjohn-Beatson (music editors); Michael Donaldson (foley editor); Simon Riley (foley artist)	Disney+
2021	1971: The Year That Music Changed Everything	"Episode 1"	Andy Shelley, Stephen Griffiths (supervising sound editors); Tae Hak Kim, Justin Dolby (sound effects editors); Claire Ellis (dialogue editor); Adam Oakley, Paolo Pavesi (foley editors); Dan Johnson, Nas Parkash (music editors); Zoe Freed, Rebecca Heathcote (foley artists)	Apple TV+
2021	Bob Ross: Happy Accidents, Betrayal & Greed		Trevor Gates (supervising sound editor); Ryan Briley, Taylor Jackson (dialogue editors); Paul B. Knox, Russell Topal Mark Coffey (sound effects editors); Alex Jongbloed (foley editor); Tara Blume (foley artist); Liam Rice (music editor)	Netflix
2021	Exterminate All the Brutes		Séverin Favriau, Emeline Aldeguer (sound editors); Daniel Irribaren (dialogue editor); Vincent Maloumian (foley artist)	HBO/HBO Max
2021	Formula 1: Drive to Survive	"Down to the Wire"	Steve Speed, Nick Fry (supervising sound editors); Hugh Dwan (sound effects editor); James Evans (sound designer); Hugh Dwan (dialogue editor)	Netflix
2021	Life in Colour with David Attenborough	"Seeing in Color"	Wayne Pashley (supervising sound editor); Paul Fisher (sound effects editor); Jonathan Cawte, Andy Devine, Richard Hinton (foley artists); James Dorman (music editor)	Netflix
2021	McCartney 3, 2, 1		Jonathan Greber (supervising sound editor); Leff Lefferts (sound editor); E. Larry Oatfield, Bjorn Ole Schroeder (dialogue editors); Kim Foscato (music editor)	Hulu
2021	Welcome to Earth		Jay Price (supervising sound editor; sound effects editor); Tom Foster (dialogue editor); Stuart Bagshaw (foley editor); Ben Smithers (music editor)	Disney+
2022	Formula 1: Drive to Survive	"Gloves Are Off"	Steve Speed, Nick Fry (supervising sound editors); James Evans (sound designer); Hugh Dwan (sound editor)	Netflix
2022	George Carlin's American Dream		Bobby Mackston (supervising sound editor); Matt Temple, Joseph Beshenkovsky (sound effects editors); Miriam Cole (dialogue editor)	HBO Max
2022	Lucy and Desi		Anthony Vanchure, Daniel Pagan (supervising sound editors); Mike James Gallagher (sound effects editor)	Prime Video
2022	Selena Gomez: My Mind & Me		Anthony Vanchure (supervising sound editor); Mike James Gallagher (sound designer); Matt Olivo, Jeff Pitts (sound effects editors); Luke Kelley, Sanaa Kelley (foley artists)	Apple TV+
2022	Tony Hawk: Until The Wheels Fall Off		John M. Chalfant (supervising sound editor); Chris Goodes (sound effects editor); Andrew Rice (dialogue editor)	HBO Max
2022	Trainwreck: Woodstock '99	"Kerosene, Match. Boom!"	Nas Parkash (supervising sound editor); Will Chapman, Tristan Powell (sound effects editors); Claire Ellis (dialogue editor)	Netflix
