= Six Nations: Full Contact =

Documentary television series

- Genre: Docudrama
- Original language: English
- No. of seasons: 1
- No. of episodes: 8

Production
- Executive producers: James Gay-Rees; Martin Conway
- Running time: 33–47 minutes
- Production company: Box to Box Films

Original release
- Network: Netflix
- Release: 24 January 2024 – 29 January 2025

Six Nations: Full Contact is a television documentary series produced in a collaboration between Netflix and the Six Nations, to give a behind-the-scenes look at the players and matches of the Six Nations Championship.

The first season, covering the 2023 Six Nations Championship, was released on 24 January 2024. This was followed by a second season focusing on the 2024 event, released on 29 January 2025. Prior to the release of the second season it had been announced that Netflix would not be producing a third.

== Episodes ==
=== Season 1 ===
No.	Title	Original release date
1	"Let Battle Commence"	24 January 2024
Scotland warm up for their opening match at Twickenham, where they haven't won against England in over a century. Is this the year they defy the odds?
2	"Hard Knock Life"	24 January 2024
Italy's under pressure to perform in the England game. With last years injury at the front of his mind, Sebastian Negri faces up to the challenge.
3	"On the Edge"	24 January 2024
It's only round two but the stakes couldn't be higher as France, last years reigning champions, face the world number one - Ireland
4	"The Second Coming"	24 January 2024
With the Wales team in turmoil on and off the pitch, their old head coach returns to shake things up. Will his gamble pay off in the match against England?
5	"La Défense"	24 January 2024
Following a rocky start, everything depends on the next game for last year's champions, France. Will they find their form, or is the title gone for good?
6	"Pressure Cooker"	24 January 2024
With two teams in the championship on a losing streak, more than a wooden spoon is at stake as they prepare to face each other in the next round.
7	"The Last Dance"	24 January 2024
All of the Scottish team are keen to be picked for the next round. But their coach has a hard choice to make, as his best players are plagued by injury.
8	"Agony or Ecstasy"	24 January 2024
It's Super Saturday, the epic conclusion of rugby's biggest championship. As all six teams take to the pitch, there can only be one winner.

=== Season 2 ===
No.	Title	Original release date
1	"Opportunity Knocks"	29 January 2025
Italy have never beat England in a Six Nations match. With a new coach and a new strategy, this could be the game that changes everything.
2	"Boys to Men"	29 January 2025
Wales haven't won at Twickenham in over a decade. Their team is young and inexperienced. How will they fare in their pivotal match against England?.
3	"Hearts and Minds"	29 January 2025
As Scotland prepare to defend the iconic Calcutta Cup at home against their fiercest rivals, the England team is rocked by some tragic news.
4	"Borrowed Time"	29 January 2025
France and Wales are flailing in the competition. With both coaches under intense scrutiny, they decide to inject some new blood into their squads.
5	"Eyes on the Prize"	29 January 2025
Everyone on the England team is desperate to be picked for the match against Ireland, while the reigning champions are focused on retaining their title.
6	"Great Expectations"	29 January 2025
Italy's new coach is determined to reverse their consistent losing streak. Could they ever stand a chance against the unpredictable Scottish team?
7	"Field of Dreams"	29 January 2025
One team has lost every match in the competition so far. One is the eternal underdog. Who will break their losing streak — and who gets the wooden spoon?
8	"The Final Reckoning"	29 January 2025
It's Super Saturday, the final showdown of the Six Nations. Two teams have the chance of taking home the title and the stakes couldn't be higher.

== Production and concept ==
In January 2023, Netflix ordered a behind-the-scenes series on the 2023 Six Nations Championship.

In January 2025, Six Nations CEO Tom Harrison told a media event promoting the second season that "Netflix made the strategic decision not to continue" producing the series.

== Release ==
The trailer for the first season was released on 17 January 2024, and on 24 January 2024, the series premiered on Netflix.

== Reception ==
The first season was described in a review for The Guardian as feeling "formulaic" and "familiar", while Rugby World criticised a lack of "nuance" in favour of a cinematic spectacle that was "reality in the loosest sense of the world". Most critics noted parallels to Formula 1: Drive to Survive, also produced by Box to Box Films, but regarded Full Contact as inferior and unlikely to create new fans of the sport. While some praised the series for offering existing fans a look 'behind the scenes' of the championship, others complained of staged conversations and a lack of access.

The second season was also negatively received, with The Journal noting the show's cancellation was "no surprise" after being a "missed opportunity".

== See also ==
- List of Netflix original programming
