= Break Point (2023 TV series) =

British documentary television series

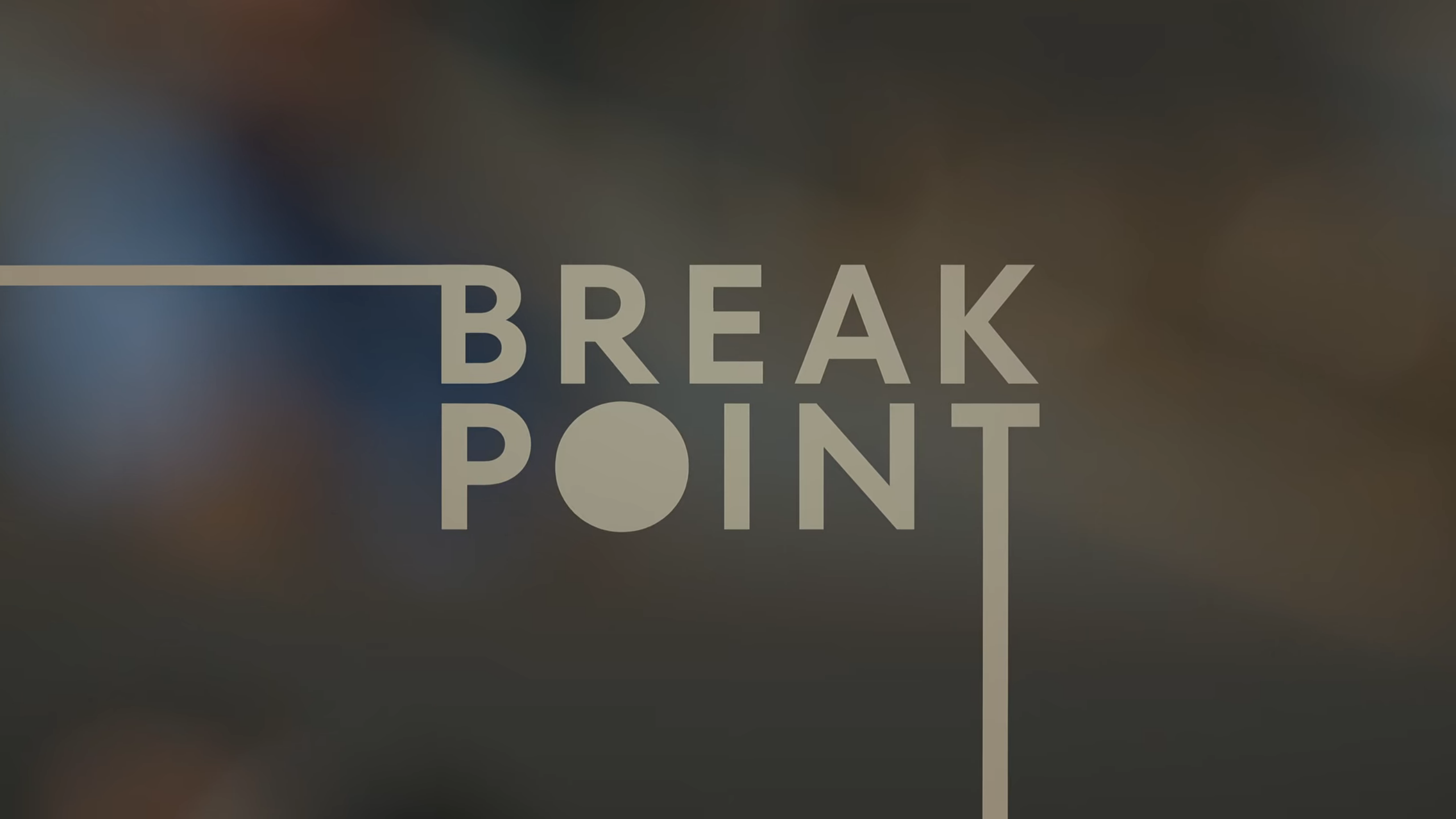
- Genre: Docudrama
- Directed by: Martin Webb
- Theme music composer: Tom Fuller
- Composers: Edmund Butt; Tom Fuller
- Country of origin: United Kingdom
- Original language: English
- No. of seasons: 2
- No. of episodes: 16

Production
- Executive producers: James Gay-Rees; Paul Martin; Ugo Valensi; Nick Bourne; Nonuk Walter
- Producer: Annie Tetchner
- Editors: Itamar Klasmr; Kim Duke; Ben Hills
- Running time: 43–52 minutes
- Production company: Box to Box Films

Original release
- Network: Netflix
- Release: 13 January 2023 – 10 January 2024

Break Point was a documentary series produced in collaboration between Netflix, Association of Tennis Professionals (ATP), and Women's Tennis Association (WTA) to give a behind-the-scenes look at some of the major players and tournaments during the 2022 and 2023 ATP Tour and WTA Tour.

The first part, consisting of five episodes and focusing on the 2022 Australian Open, Indian Wells Masters, Madrid Open, and French Open, was released on 13 January 2023, while the second part, consisting of five episodes and focusing on the 2022 Wimbledon, Eastbourne International, Queen's Club, U.S. Open, WTA Finals, and ATP Finals, was released on 21 June 2023. In March 2023, the series was renewed for a second season that was released on 10 January 2024. On 8 March 2024, Netflix cancelled the series.

== Cast ==
=== Season 1 ===
==== ATP Tour ====
- Félix Auger-Aliassime
- Matteo Berrettini
- Taylor Fritz
- Thanasi Kokkinakis
- Nick Kyrgios
- Casper Ruud
- Stefanos Tsitsipas

==== WTA Tour ====
- Paula Badosa
- Ons Jabeur
- Maria Sakkari
- Ajla Tomljanovic

=== Season 2 ===
==== ATP Tour ====
- Nick Kyrgios
- Holger Rune
- Taylor Fritz
- Frances Tiafoe
- Tommy Paul
- Alexander Zverev
- Ben Shelton

==== WTA Tour ====
- Aryna Sabalenka
- Jessica Pegula
- Maria Sakkari

== Episodes ==
Series	Episodes		Originally released
1	10	5	13 January 2023
1	10	5	21 June 2023
2	6		10 January 2024

=== Season 1 (2023) ===
No. overall	No. in season	Title	Original release date
Part 1
1	1	"The Maverick"	13 January 2023
Nick Kyrgios, whose reputation as tennis' "bad boy" threatens to overshadow his talent, fights to find joy on the court at the 2022 Australian Open.
2	2	"Take the Crown"	13 January 2023
Novak Djokovic's ban from the Australian Open leaves an opportunity for a newcomer to rise to the top; Matteo Berrettini strives to step up.
3	3	"California Dreaming"	13 January 2023
The Indian Wells tournament means big money and big names; for California native Taylor Fritz, it could mean a career-changing match against Rafael Nadal.
4	4	"Great Expectations"	13 January 2023
Spanish player Paula Badosa feels the pressure of entering the Madrid Open as a hometown favourite, while Tunisia's Ons Jabeur looks to make history.
5	5	"King of Clay"	13 January 2023
Félix Auger-Aliassime of Montreal and Norway's Casper Ruud face reigning "king of clay" Rafael Nadal at the French Open.
Part 2
6	6	"Belonging"	21 June 2023
Wimbledon is the cathedral of tennis, and the oldest Grand Slam represents the pinnacle of the sport; Nick Kyrgios is ready to prove he can finally reach his singles potential; Ajla Tomljanovic seeks to overcome personal and professional heartbreaks.
7	7	"Saints and Sinners"	21 June 2023
Ons Jabeur pursues her first Grand Slam; Nick Kyrgios plays brilliantly amid a cloud of scandal; in the final, Jabeur's finesse comes under attack from Elena Rybakina's massive serve; Kyrgios goes head to head with defending champion Novak Djokovic.
8	8	"Fairytale in New York"	21 June 2023
New York City streets are abuzz; the 2022 U.S. Open is electric: Serena Williams announces she will retire at the end of the tourney; for Ajla Tomljanovic, this is a chance to prove she's found the mental strength to play up to her potential.
9	9	"Under Pressure"	21 June 2023
The young guns continue to shine at the U.S. Open; Iga Swiatek, Carlos Alcaraz and Frances Tiafoe reach the quarter-finals; the raucous crowd may throw Swiatek off her game; for Tiafoe, it's the chance to achieve a lifelong dream.
10	10	"One Last Chance"	21 June 2023
The 2022 season draws to a close with the ATP/WTA Finals, in which the top eight men and women compete for a huge payday. Taylor Fritz gets a call to join the men's tournament in Turin, Italy and Aryna Sabalenka wants to end the year on a high note.

=== Season 2 (2024) ===
No. overall	No. in season	Title	Original release date
11	1	"The Curse"	10 January 2024
The 2023 Australian Open kicks off, as Nick Kyrgios seeks payback, Aryna Sabalenka pursues a dream, and players from last season exit the tournament early.
12	2	"The Future is Yours"	10 January 2024
Led by Carlos Alcaraz and Holger Rune, a new generation of young players looks to take down the old guard, starting with Novak Djokovic.
13	3	"Friend or Foe"	10 January 2024
At the 2023 Indian Wells tournament, Taylor Fritz tries to defend his number one American title against friendly rivals Frances Tiafoe and Tommy Paul.
14	4	"Unfinished Business"	10 January 2024
After a horrific injury at the 2022 French Open, Alexander Zverev attempts a comeback and faces a formidable opponent in Daniil Medvedev.
15	5	"Now or Never"	10 January 2024
For perennial top 10 players Jessica Pegula and Maria Sakkari, it's time to put a win on the board; however, nerves and bad weather make for brutal matches.
16	6	"Becoming the One"	10 January 2024
With pressure at an all-time high, Coco Gauff and Frances Tiafoe fight for greatness at the 2023 US Open.

== Production ==
In January 2022, Netflix ordered a documentary series of a behind-the-scenes look at the men's and women's professional tennis players throughout the four Grand Slam tournaments. It is produced by Box to Box Films, who produced the Formula One documentary series Formula 1: Drive to Survive, with James Gay-Rees and Paul Martin as executive producers and Kari Lia as Showrunner. In December 2022, Netflix announced that the series would be titled Break Point and would feature Félix Auger-Aliassime, Paula Badosa, Matteo Berrettini, Taylor Fritz, Ons Jabeur, Thanasi Kokkinakis, Nick Kyrgios, Casper Ruud, Aryna Sabalenka, Maria Sakkari, Sloane Stephens, Iga Świątek, Frances Tiafoe, Ajla Tomljanovic, and Stefanos Tsitsipas. On 7 March 2023, Netflix renewed the series for a second season.

== Reception ==
=== Critical response ===
For the first season, the review aggregator website Rotten Tomatoes reported an 81% approval rating with an average rating of 6.3/10 based on 21 reviews. Metacritic, which uses a weighted average, assigned a score of 70 out of 100 for the season, based on reviews from 7 critics, indicating "generally favorable reviews".

== See also ==
- List of Netflix original programming
