= Golden Reel Awards 2021 =

Sound editing awards

69th Golden Reel Awards
- Date: March 13, 2022
- Presented by: Motion Picture Sound Editors

Highlights
- Feature Dialogue and ADR: Nightmare Alley
- Feature Sound Effects and Foley: Dune

The 69th Golden Reel Awards, were held on March 13, 2022, by the Motion Picture Sound Editors (M.P.S.E.) to honor the best in sound editing for film, television, computer entertainment and student productions in 2021. The nominations were announced on January 24, 2022. The film Dune led the nominations with three.

== Winners and nominees ==
The winners are listed first and on bold.

=== Film ===
Outstanding Achievement in Sound Editing – Dialogue and ADR for Feature Film	Outstanding Achievement in Sound Editing – Sound Effects and Foley for Feature Film
Nightmare Alley – Jill Purdy (supervising sound editor; supervising dialogue and adr editor); Nelson Ferreira (dialogue editor); Dune – David Bach (dialogue editor); Last Night in Soho – Dan Morgan, Julian Slater (supervising sound editors); Dan Morgan (supervising adr editor); The Matrix Resurrections – Stephanie Flack, Dane A Davis (supervising sound editors); Marek Forreiter, Benjamin Hörbe, Dominik Schleier, Immo Trümpelmann (dialogue editors); No Time to Die – Becki Ponting, Michael Maroussas (supervising dialogue and adr editors); Rachael Tate, Adele Fletcher (dialogue editors); Oliver Tarney (supervising sound editor); The Power of the Dog – Leah Katz (supervising dialogue and adr editor); A Quiet Place Part II – Ethan Van der Ryn (supervising sound editor); Vanessa Lapato, Nancy Nugent (supervising dialogue and adr editor); Matt Cavanaugh (dialogue editor); The Tragedy of Macbeth – Skip Lievsay (supervising sound editor); Michael Feuser (supervising dialogue editor)	Dune – Theo Green, Mark Mangini (supervising sound editors); Dave Whitehead (sound designer); Phil Barrie, Lee Gilmore, Greg Ten Bosch, Robert Kellough, Piero Mura (sound effects editors); Christopher Bonis (Foley editor); Andy Malcolm, Goro Koyama, Sandra Fox (Foley artists); Belfast – James Mather (sound designer); Tomas Blazukas (sound editor); Arthur Grayley (Foley editor); Sue Harding, Oliver Ferris (Foley artists); The Matrix Resurrections – Dane A. Davis, Stephanie Flack (supervising sound editors); Bryan O. Watkins, Jeremy Peirson, Markus Stemler, Michael Schapiro, Eric Lindemann, Albert Gasser, Laurent Kossayan, Caron Weidner (sound effects editors); Frank Kruse, Kuen Il Song (Foley editors); Daniel Weiss (Foley artist); Nightmare Alley – Nathan Robitaille (supervising sound editor); Dashen Naidoo (sound effects editor); Chelsea Body (Foley editor); Goro Koyama, Andy Malcolm (Foley artists); No Time to Die – Oliver Tarney, James Harrison (supervising sound editors); Bryan Bowen, Eilam Hoffman (sound designers); Dawn Gough (sound effects editor); Hugo Adams (Foley editor); Sue Harding, Andrea King (Foley artists); A Quiet Place Part II – Ethan Van der Ryn, Erik Aadahl (supervising sound editors); Malte Bieler, Brandon Jones (sound designers); Chris Diebold, Matt Cavanaugh (sound effects editors); Jonathan Klein (Foley editor); Steve Baine, Peter Persaud (Foley artists); Spider-Man: No Way Home – Steven Ticknor (supervising sound editor); Anthony Lamberti (sound designer)
Outstanding Achievement in Sound Editing – Feature Music	Outstanding Achievement in Sound Editing – Feature Documentary
West Side Story – Joe E. Rand, Ramiro Belgardt (music editors); David Channing (scoring editor); Dune – Clint Bennett, Ryan Rubin (supervising music editors); Peter Myles (music editors); Ghostbusters: Afterlife – Curt Sobel (supervising music editor); In the Heights – Jim Bruening, Jennifer Dunnington, Ben Holiday (music editors); The Matrix Resurrections – Gabriel Isaac Mounsey (supervising music editor); Hans Hafner, Jonathan Levi Shanes (music editors); Nightmare Alley – Clint Bennett, Kevin Banks (music editors); Cecile Tournesac (scoring editor); A Quiet Place Part II – Jim Schultz, Nancy Allen, Del Spiva, Ramiro Belgardt (music editors); tick tick...BOOM! – Nancy Allen, John Davis, Bri Holland (music editors)	The Rescue – Deborah Wallach (supervising sound editor); Roland Vajs (sound effects editor); Nuno Bentro (Foley artist); Ben Smithers (music editor); Billie Eilish: The World's a Little Blurry – Richard Yawn (supervising sound editor); Michael Brake (music editor); Rob Getty (dialogue editor); Steven Avila (sound effects editor); Shawn Kennelly (Foley editor); Melissa Kennelly, Vince Nicastro (Foley artists); Flee – Edward Björner (supervising sound editor); Jens Johansson (dialogue editor); Fredrik Jonsäter (sound designer); Rune Van Deurs, Bengt Öberg (Foley artists); Summer of Soul (or, when the Revolution Could Not Be Televised) – Joshua L. Pearson (supervising sound editor); Jimmy Douglass (supervising music editor); Val – John Bolen (supervising sound editor; dialogue editor; sound effects editor; Foley editor); The Velvet Underground – Leslie Shatz (supervising sound editor); Jahn Sood (music editor)
Outstanding Achievement in Sound Editing – Sound Effects, Foley, Dialogue and ADR for Animated Feature Film	Outstanding Achievement in Sound Editing – Sound Effects, Foley, Dialogue and ADR for Foreign Language Feature Film
Raya and the Last Dragon – Shannon Mills (supervising sound editor); Brad Semenoff (supervising dialogue editor); Nia Hansen (sound designer); Samson Neslund, David C. Hughes, Cameron Barker (sound effects editors); Chris Frazier, Steve Orlando (Foley editors); John Roesch, Shelley Roden (Foley artists); Jim Weidman (supervising music editor); David Olson (music editor); Encanto – Shannon Mills (supervising sound editor); Brad Semenoff (supervising dialogue editor); Nia Hansen (sound designer); Samson Neslund, Justin Doyle, Cameron Barker, Qianbaihui Yang (sound effects editors); Richard Quinn (dialogue editor); Alyssa Nevarez (Foley editor); John Roesch, Shelley Roden (Foley artists); Earl Ghaffari (supervising music editor); Angie Rubin, Kendall Demarest (music editors); Luca – Chris Scarabosio, André Fenley (supervising sound editors); Rich Quinn (supervising dialogue editor); Ronni Brown (supervising Foley editor); Justin Doyle, Pascal Garneau (sound effects editors); E. Larry Oatfield (Foley editor); Jana Vance, Ronni Brown (Foley artists); Lodge Worster (music editor); The Mitchells vs. the Machines – Geoffrey G. Rubay (supervising sound editor); James Morioka (supervising adr editor); John Pospisil (sound designer); Kip Smedley, Andy Sisul, Alec G. Rubay, Dan Kenyon, Greg Ten Bosch (sound effects editors): Curt Schulkey (adr editor); Gregg Barbanell, Rick Owens (Foley artists); Dominick Certo, Barbara McDermott (music editors); Sing 2 – Dennis Leonard (supervising sound editor); Jonathan Greber (supervising dialogue editor); Daniel Laurie (supervising adr editor); Josh Gold (sound designer); Lucas Miller, Benjamin A. Burtt (sound effects editors); Shaun Farley, Jonathon Stevens (Foley editors); Michael Connell, Charles Inouye (music editors)	Cliff Walkers – Yang Jiang, Zhao Nan (supervising sound editors); Li Xinghui (adr editor); Han Junsheng (Foley artist); Ann Scibelli, Xiao'ou Olivia Zhang, Iain Pattison (sound editors); The Hand of God – Silvia Moraes (supervising sound editor); A Hero – Mohammadreza Delpak (supervising sound editor; dialogue editor; sound effects editor); Titane – Séverin Favriau (sound editor); Céline Bernard (Foley artist); A Writer's Odyssey – Xiao Sha Liu (supervising sound editor; supervising adr editor); Gang Wang (sound designer); Shuang Shuang Wang, Hong Rui Ji, Gang Wang, Ruo Qi Mo, Tobias Poppe, Zi Jian Jiang (sound effects editors); Zi Jin (dialogue editor); Pei Ya Zhang (Foley editor); Zi Wei Wang, Yin Miao (Foley artists); Fei Yu (music editor)

=== Broadcast media ===
Outstanding Achievement in Sound Editing – Series 1 Hour – Comedy or Drama – Dialogue and ADR	Outstanding Achievement in Sound Editing – Series 1 Hour – Comedy or Drama – Sound Effects and Foley
Succession: "Secession" – Nicholas Renbeck (supervising sound editor); Michael Feuser (dialogue editor); Angela Organ (adr editor) (HBO Max); For All Mankind: "And Here's to You" – Vince Balunas (supervising sound editor; dialogue editor; adr editor) (Apple TV+); The Handmaid's Tale: "Vows" – David McCallum (supervising sound editor); Krystin Hunter (dialogue editor) (Hulu); The Morning Show: "My Least Favorite Year" – Mark Relyea (supervising sound editor); Julie Altus (supervising adr editor); Robert Guastini (dialogue editor); Pernell Salinas (supervising dialogue editor) (Apple TV+); The Nevers: "Pilot" – Tim Kimmel (supervising sound editor); Tim Hands (supervising adr editor); John Matter (supervising dialogue editor) (HBO Max); Squid Game: "VIPS" – Hye-Young Kang, Tae-Young Choi (supervising sound editors); Byung-In Kim (supervising adr editor); Eun-Ji Ye (supervising dialogue editor) (Netflix); Star Trek: Discovery: "Kobayashi Maru" – Matthew E. Taylor (supervising sound editor); Sean Heissinger, Cormac Funge (supervising dialogue editors); Cormac Funge (adr editor) (Paramount+); Ted Lasso: "Rainbow" – Brent Findley (supervising sound editor); Bernard Weiser (dialogue editor); Kip Smedley (crowd editor) (Apple TV+)	The Witcher: "A Grain of Truth" – Matthew Collinge (supervising sound editor); Rob Turner, Alyn Sclosa, Rob Prynne (sound designers); Adam Oakley, Rob Weatherall (Foley editors); Zoe Freed, Rebecca Heathcote (Foley artists) (Netflix); Foundation: "The Emperor's Peace" – Tyler Whitham (sound designer); Paul Germann, Dave Rose (sound effects editors); Steve Baine (Foley artist) (Apple TV+); The Handmaid's Tale: "Chicago" – Jane Tattersall, David McCallum (supervising sound editors); Brennan Mercer (sound effects editor); David Caporale (Foley editor); Sandra Fox (Foley artist) (Hulu); Lost in Space: "Trust" – Branden Spencer (supervising sound editor); Benjamin Cook (sound designer); Shaughnessy Hare, Brendan Croxon (sound effects editors); Paul Pirola (Foley artist) (Netflix); Squid Game: "VIPS" – Hye-Young Kang (supervising sound editor); Ye-Jin Jo (sound designer); Hye-Jin Yang (sound effects editor); Taek-Hyun Hong (Foley editor); Chung-Gyu Lee (Foley artist) (Netflix); Star Trek: Discovery: "Kobayashi Maru" – Matthew E. Taylor, Michael Schapiro (supervising sound editors); Harry Cohen, Katie Halliday (sound designers); Andrew Twite (sound effects editor); Clay Weber (Foley editor); Alyson Moore, Chris Moriana (Foley artists) (Paramount+); Ted Lasso: "Beard's Night Out" – Brent Findley (supervising sound editor); Kip Smedley, Mark Cleary (sound effects editors); Jordan McClain, Arno Stephanian (Foley editors); Sanaa Kelley, Matt Salib (Foley artists) (Apple TV+); Wu-Tang: An American Saga: "Protect Ya Neck" – Thomas E. de Gorter (supervising sound editor); Michael O'Conner (sound designer); Geordy Sincavage, Alex Jongbloed (Foley editors); Tara Blume, Monique Reymond (Foley artists) (Hulu)
Outstanding Achievement in Sound Editing – Non-Theatrical Feature	Outstanding Achievement in Sound Editing – Non-Theatrical Animation
Infinite – Mandell Winter, David Esparza (supervising sound editors); Hamilton Sterling (sound designer); Will Digby (sound effects editor); Micah Loken, Sang Kim (dialogue editors); Eryne Prine (Foley editor); Mark "Vordo" Wlodarkiewicz, Dan O'Connell, John Cucci (Foley artists) (Paramount+); Fear of Rain – David Barber (supervising sound editor); David Kitchens (Foley editor); Ben Zarai (sound effects editor); David Barbee (sound designer); Gonzalo "Bino" Espinoza (Foley artist); Michael Kreple (adr editor) (Hulu); Fear Street Part Two: 1978 – Trevor Gates (supervising sound editor); Jason Dotts (supervising dialogue editor); Matthew Thomas Hall, Russell Topal Mark Coffey (sound effects editors); Kristen Hirlinger, Harrison Meyle (dialogue editors); Sandra Fox (Foley artist); Brett "Snacky" Pierce (music editor) (Netflix); The Ice Road – Trip Brock (supervising sound editor); Charles Maynes (sound designer); Jacob Ortiz (supervising adr editor); Jackie Johnson (dialogue editor); Raymond Park Demetri Evdoxiadis (sound effects editors); Lorita de la Cerna, G.W. Pope, III (Foley artists); Nicholas Fitzgerald (music editor) (Netflix); Oslo – Lewis Goldstein (supervising sound editor); Gina Alfano (supervising adr editor); Peter John Still (sound designer); Alex Soto, Alfred DeGrand (sound effects editors); Thomas Ryan (dialogue editor); Wen Tseng (Foley editor); Leslie Bloome, Joanna Fang (Foley artists) (HBO Max)	Arcane: "When These Walls Come Tumbling Down" – Brad Beaumont, Eliot Connors (supervising sound editors); Alexander Temple (supervising music editor); Shannon Beaumont (supervising adr editor); Alexander Ephraim (Foley editor); Dan O' Connell, John Cucci (Foley artists); Alex Seaver (music editor) (Netflix); Lego Star Wars: Terrifying Tales – David W. Collins, Matthew Wood (supervising sound editors); David W. Collins (sound designer); Justin Doyle, Bonnie Wild (sound editors); Frank Rinella (Foley editor); Kimberly Patrick, Andrea Gard (Foley artists) (Disney+); Maya and the Three: "Chapter 9: The Sun and the Moon" – Scott Martin Gershin (supervising sound editor); Chris Richardson, Andrew Vernon, Scott Martin Gershin (sound designers); David Barbee, Masanobu "Tomi" Tomita (sound effects editors); Dan O'Connell (Foley artist); Andres Locsey (music editor) (Netflix); What If...?: "What If... Doctor Strange Lost His Heart Instead of His Hands?" – Mac Smith (supervising sound editor); Bill Rudolph, Alyssa Nevarez (sound effects editors); Cheryl Nardi (dialogue editor); Anele Onyekwere (supervising music editor); Tom Kramer (music editor); John Roesch, Shelley Roden (Foley artists) (Disney+); White Snake 2: The Tribulation of the Green Snake – Gary Chen (supervising sound editor; sound designer); Wang Shuangshuang, Gary Chen, Mango Mok, Ji Hongrui, Irene Sun, Qiu Yi (sound effects editors); Listen Zhang, Liu Huizhe (adr editors); Liu Huizhe, Cui Lin (Foley editors); Wang Ziwei, Miao Yin, Zhang Jindong, Xin Shengnan (Foley artists) (Netflix)
Outstanding Achievement in Sound Editing – Series 1 Hour – Comedy or Drama – Music	Outstanding Achievement in Sound Editing – 1/2 Hour – Comedy or Drama
Wu-Tang: An American Saga: "Protect Ya Neck" – Sebastian Zuleta (music editor) (Hulu); Cobra Kai: "The Rise" – Andres Locsey (music editor) (Netflix); See: "Rock-a-Bye" – Dan Farkas (music editor) (Apple TV+); Squid Game: "Red Light, Green Light" – Jae-il Jung (music editor) (Netflix); Star Trek: Discovery: "Kobayashi Maru" – Moira Marquis (supervising music editor); Matea Prljevic (scoring editor) (Paramount+); Ted Lasso: "Rainbow" – Richard David Brown (supervising music editor); Sharyn Gersh (music editor) (Apple TV+); The Witcher: "A Grain of Truth" – Arabella Winter (music editor) (Netflix)	Only Murders in the Building: "The Boy From 6B" – Mathew Waters (supervising sound editor); Danika Wikke (dialogue editor); Meredith Stacy (sound effects editor); Micha Liberman (music editor) (Hulu); Hacks: "There Is No Line" – Brett Hinton (supervising sound editor); Marc Glassman (sound effects editor); Ryne Gierke (dialogue editor); Samuel Munoz (Foley editor); Noel Vought (Foley artist); Jason Tregoe Newman (music editor) (HBO Max); The Kominsky Method: "The Round Toes, of the High Shoes" – Lou Thomas (supervising sound editor); Mark Messick, TJ Jacques (sound effects editors); Clay Weber (Foley editor); Sanaa Kelley (Foley artist) (Netflix); Mythic Quest: "Everlight" – Matthew E. Taylor (supervising sound editor); Pete Nichols (sound designer); Matthew Wilson (sound effects editor); Sean Heissinger (dialogue editor); David Jobe (Foley editor); Elizabeth Rainey, Jody Holwadel Thomas (Foley artists); Joe Deveau (music editor) (Apple TV+); Schmigadoon!: "Suddenly" – Cormac Funge (supervising sound editor); Peter Nichols (sound effects editor); John Green (dialogue editor) (Apple TV+); We Are Lady Parts: "Sparta" – Jay Price (supervising sound editor); Tom Foster (sound editor); Dario Swade (dialogue editor); Sam Walsh (Foley editor) (Peacock); What We Do in the Shadows: "The Escape" – Steffan Falesitch (supervising sound editor); David Barbee (sound effects editor); Chris Kahwaty (dialogue editor); John Guentner, Sam Lewis (Foley editors); Ellen Heuer (Foley artist); Steve Griffen (music editor) (FX)
Outstanding Achievement in Sound Editing – Animation Series or Short	Outstanding Achievement in Sound Editing – Non-Theatrical Documentary
Love, Death + Robots: "Snow in the Desert" – Brad North (supervising sound editor); Craig Henighan (sound designer); Jeff Gross, Dawn Lunsford (Foley editors); Alicia Stevens (Foley artist); Jeff Charbonneau (music editor) (Netflix); Jurassic World Camp Cretaceous: "Eye of the Storm" – Rob McIntyre (supervising sound editor); Evan Dockter (sound designer); Marc Schmidt, D.J. Lynch (sound effects editors); Anna Adams (dialogue editor); Aran Tanchum (Foley editor); Ezra Walker, Vincent Guisetti (Foley artists) (Netflix); Star Trek: Lower Decks: "Strange Energies" – James Lucero (supervising sound editor); James Singleton, Mak Kellerman (sound effects editors); Michael LaFerla (dialogue editor); Michael Britt (Foley artist) (Paramount+); Star Wars: Visions: "The Duel" – David W. Collins, Matthew Wood (supervising sound editors); David W. Collins (sound designer); Luke Dunn Gielmuda (sound editor); Jana Vance (Foley artist) (Disney+); Star Wars: The Bad Batch: "Reunion" – Matthew Wood (supervising sound editor); David W. Collins (sound designer); David W. Collins (sound editor); Frank Rinella (Foley editor); Kimberly Patrick (Foley artist) (Disney+); Star Wars: A Galaxy of Sounds: "Excitement" – David W. Collins (supervising sound editor); Ben Burtt, David Acord, Ren Klyce, Tim Nielson, Chris Scarabosio, Tom Bellfort, Sam Shaw, Gary Rydstrom (sound designers); Matthew Wood (sound editor) (Disney+)	The Beatles: Get Back: "Part 3" – Brent Burge, Martin Kwok (supervising sound editors); Matt Stutter, Buster Flaws, Melanie Graham (sound editors); Emile De La Rey (dialogue editor); Steve Gallagher, Tane Upjohn-Beatson (music editors); Michael Donaldson (Foley editor); Simon Riley (Foley artist) (Disney+); 1971: The Year That Music Changed Everything: "Episode 1" – Andy Shelley, Stephen Griffiths (supervising sound editors); Tae Hak Kim, Justin Dolby (sound effects editors); Claire Ellis (dialogue editor); Adam Oakley, Paolo Pavesi (Foley editors); Dan Johnson, Nas Parkash (music editors); Zoe Freed, Rebecca Heathcote (Foley artists) (Apple TV+); Bob Ross: Happy Accidents, Betrayal & Greed – Trevor Gates (supervising sound editor); Ryan Briley, Taylor Jackson (dialogue editors); Paul B. Knox, Russell Topal Mark Coffey (sound effects editors); Alex Jongbloed (Foley editor); Tara Blume (Foley artist); Liam Rice (music editor) (Netflix); Exterminate All the Brutes – Séverin Favriau, Emeline Aldeguer (sound editors); Daniel Irribaren (dialogue editor); Vincent Maloumian (Foley artist) (HBO/HBO Max); Formula 1: Drive to Survive: "Down to the Wire" – Steve Speed, Nick Fry (supervising sound editors); Hugh Dwan (sound effects editor); James Evans (sound designer); Hugh Dwan (dialogue editor) (Netflix); Life in Colour with David Attenborough: "Seeing in Color" – Wayne Pashley (supervising sound editor); Paul Fisher (sound effects editor); Jonathan Cawte, Andy Devine, Richard Hinton (Foley artists); James Dorman (music editor) (Netflix); McCartney 3, 2, 1 – Jonathan Greber (supervising sound editor); Leff Lefferts (sound editor); E. Larry Oatfield, Bjorn Ole Schroeder (dialogue editors); Kim Foscato (music editor) (Hulu); Welcome to Earth – Jay Price (supervising sound editor; sound effects editor); Tom Foster (dialogue editor); Stuart Bagshaw (Foley editor); Ben Smithers (music editor) (Disney+)
Outstanding Achievement in Sound Editing – Limited Series or Anthology
The Underground Railroad: "Chapter 9: Indiana Winter" – Onnalee Blank (supervising sound editor); Jay Jennings, Harry Cohen (sound designers); Luke Gibleon (sound effects editor); Chris Kahwaty, Katy Wood (dialogue editors); Bryan Parker (adr editor); Pietu Korhonen, Lars Halvorsen (Foley editors); Heikki Kossi (Foley artist); John Finklea (music editor) (Prime Video); The Book of Boba Fett – Matt Wood, Bonnie Wild (supervising sound editors); David Acord (sound designer); David Collins (sound effects editor); Angela Ang, Ryan Cota (adr editors); Alyssa Nevarez (Foley editor); Ronni Brown, Andrea Gard, Sean England, Margie O'Malley (Foley artists) (Disney+); Loki: "Journey into Mystery" – David Acord, Matthew Wood (supervising sound editors); Kyrsten Mate, Adam Kopald (sound effects editors); Steve Slanec (supervising dialogue editor); Brad Semenoff (adr editor); David Farmer (sound designer); Joel Raabe (Foley editor); Shelley Roden, John Roesch (Foley artists); Anele Onyekwere (supervising music editor); Nashia Wachsman, Ed Hamilton (music editors) (Disney+); Mare of Easttown: "Illusions" – Bradley North (supervising sound editor); Tiffany S. Griffith (dialogue editor); Jordan Wilby (sound effects editor); Antony Zeller (Foley editor); Zane Bruce (Foley artist); Stephanie Lowry (music editor) (HBO Max); WandaVision: "The Series Finale" – Gwen Whittle, Kimberly Foscato (supervising sound editors); Steve Orlando (sound designer); Scott Guitteau, Jon Borland, Samson Neslund, Richard Gould (sound effects editors); Anele Onyekwere (supervising music editor); James Spencer, Chris Gridley (adr editors); Luke Dunn Gielmuda (Foley editor); Fernand Bos, Tom Kramer (music editors); Ronni Brown, Shelley Roden, John Roesch (Foley artists) (Disney+); The White Lotus – Kathryn Madsen (supervising sound editor); Paul Hammond (supervising dialogue editor); Mark Allen (sound effects editor); Stefan Fraticelli (Foley artist); Mikael Sandgren (music editor) (HBO)

=== Gaming ===
Outstanding Achievement in Sound Editing – Game Audio
- Call of Duty: Vanguard – David Swenson (audio director); Matthew Grimm, Ryan McSweeney, Michael Caisley, Eric Wedemeyer (audio leads); Charles Deenen, Nick Interlandi, Nick Martin (supervising sound editors); Emilio Lopez-Centellas, Adam Boyd, Hilary Long (supervising dialogue editors); Ted Kocher, Anthony Caruso (supervising music editor); Kegan Chau, Fernando Labarthe, Sheridan Willard, Tyler Cannan, Michael Tornabene, Peter Wayne, Liam Underwood, Don Veca, Jeremiah Sypult, Andy Bayless, Darren Blondin, Nicholas D’Amato, Jacob Denny, Jacob Harley, Vadim Nuniyants, Timothy Schlie, Aaron Brown, Ian Mika, Tory Bader, Corina Bello, Darrell Tung, Jonathan Gosselin, Nick Tremblay, Mathieu Denis, Mikael Frithiof, Jon Persson, Braden Parkes, Erick Ocampo, Mike Maksim, Matt Hall, Chris Diebold, Jeff Sawyer, Josh Moore, Igor Comes, Tim Gedemer, Klaus Shipman, Jim Schaefer, Rashaad Wiggins (sound designers); Daniel Petras, Jordan Ruhala, Matthew Schaff (sound editors); Robert Jackson, Maggie Wolf, Alvaro Vela, Serge J. Isaac, Stiv Schneider, Juliana Henao Mesa, David Price (dialogue editors): Scott Shoemaker, Tao-Ping Chen, Adam Kallibjian, Rob Goodson, Andrew Buresh (music editors); Foley Walkers (Foley artist) (Infinity Ward)
- The Ascent – Samuel Justice (audio director); Stefan Rutherford, Joe Thom (audio leads); Csaba Wagner (supervising sound editor); Lee Banyard, Michael Benzie, Jordan Lee Colins, Luke Hatton, Joe Hudson, Jason W. Jennings, Michael Leaning, Barney Oram, Jack Raeburn, Stephano Sanchinelli, Chris Sweetman, John Tennant (sound designers); Graham Donnelly, Eilam Hoffman (sound editors) (Neon Giant)
- Halo Infinite – Sotaro Tojima (audio director); Kyle Fraser, Jomo Kangethe, Robbie Elias, Chase Thompson (audio leads); Samuel Justice, Csaba Wagner (supervising sound editors); Josh Bandy, Emma Emrich (supervising dialogue editors); Joel Yarger (supervising music editor); Noa Lothian, Daniel Raimo, Pax Helgesen, Nick D’Amato, Gary Spinrad, Michael Leaning, Stefan Rutherford, Mitchell Osias, Bryan O. Watkins, Andrew Lackey, Laura Taylor, David Farmer, Adam Boyd, Graham Donnelly, John Loranger, Barney Oram, Frank Petreikis, Austin Shannon, Chris Sweetman, Matthew Wesdock, Robert Blake, Paul Hackner (sound designers); Zeke Fenelon, Stephen Brown, Adam Croft, Joshua Du Chene, Thornton Prime VI, Kochun Hu, Ben Kersten, Spencer Riedel (sound effects editors); John Roesch, Alyson Dee Moore, Christopher Moriana, Bogdan Zavarzin (Foley artists); Monet Gardiner, Garret Montgomery, Daniel P. Francis, Peret Von Sturmer (dialogue editors); Colin Andrew Grant, Cameron Konner (music editors) (Xbox Game Studios)
- Ratchet & Clank: Rift Apart – Daniel Birczynski, Dwight Okahara, Jamie McMenamy (audio leads); Paul Mudra (audio director); Jeremie Voillot, Emile Mika (supervising sound editors); Patrick Michalak (supervising dialogue editor); Scott Hanau (supervising music editor); David Yingling, Blake Johnson, Jeff Dombkowski, Brooke Yap, Daniele Carli, Tyler Cornett, Tyler Hoffman, Christian Kjeldsen, Jeff Darby, Zack Bogucki, Aaron Sanchez, Kei Matsuo, David Goll, Adam Lidbetter, Alex Previty, Erik Buensuceso, Casey Slocum, Rob Castro, Gregory McCoach, Andres Herrera, Maria Rascon, Nathaniel Bonisteel, Noburo Masuda, Keiichi Kitahara (sound designers); Keith Asack, Michelangelo Muscariello, Evan Hodick, Matthew Strasser, Jaime Marcelo, Ryan Schaad, Tim Schumann (dialogue editors); Andrew Buresh, Anthony Caruso, Ernest Johnson, James Zolyak, Justin Lieberman, Nicholas Mastroianni, Rob Goodson, Scott Bergstrom, Tao-Ping Chen, Ted Kocher, Tyler Crowder (music editors) (Insomniac Games)
- Star Wars: Tales from the Galaxy's Edge – Michael Brinkman, Paul Stoughton, Kevin Bolen (supervising sound editors); Bill Rudolph, Jonathan Do, Andy Martin (sound designers); Ryan Cota, Chris Gridley (dialogue editors); Clark Rhee (music editor) (Oculus Quest)

=== Student film ===
Outstanding Achievement in Sound Editing – Student Film (Verna Fields Award)
- Build Me Up (National Film and Television School) – Wong Hui Grace (supervising sound editor)
- Cocon (Netherlands Film Academy) – Freija Hogenboom (supervising sound editor); Camiel Povel (Sound Effects Editor); Annika Epker (Foley artists)
- Do Not Feed the Pigeons (National Film and Television School) – Joe De-Vine (supervising sound editor; sound designer)
- The Many Faces of Ava (National Film and Television School) – Dominika Latusek (supervising sound editor)
- Night of the Living Dread (National Film and Television School) – Miles Sullivan (supervising sound editor)
- Other Half (National Film and Television School) – Zoltán Kadnár (supervising sound editor)
- Pressure (National Film and Television School) – Antek Rutczynski (supervising sound editor; sound designer)
- Échale Ganas, The Villa's Tacos (Chapman University) – Mingxin Qiguan (supervising sound editor; sound designer)
