= James Gay-Rees =

British film producer

- Occupation: Film producer
- Years active: 1991–present

James Gay-Rees is a British film producer. He has been involved in the production of numerous films, including critically acclaimed documentaries Senna (2010) and Amy (2015), for which he won numerous awards and nominations.

Graduating from the University of Southampton, Gay-Rees started his film career working for Miramax in London. He subsequently moved to New York for a year and later started working as a head of development in Los Angeles–based Orbit Productions. Gay-Rees eventually decided to pursue his career in documentary production; his first movie is Exit Through the Gift Shop (2010) which was nominated for the Academy Award for Best Documentary Feature. His second film, Senna (2010), also received critical acclaim, and won a BAFTA Award for Best Documentary. In 2015, he produced Amy, which was nominated for numerous awards, including BAFTA awards for Best Documentary and Outstanding British Film, as well as Academy Award for Best Documentary Feature at the 88th Academy Awards.

== Filmography ==
- Exit Through the Gift Shop (2010)
- Senna (2010)
- McCullin (2012)
- The Wedding Video (2012)
- The Quiet Ones (2014)
- All This Mayhem (2014)
- Palio (2015)
- Amy (2015)
- Ronaldo (2015)
- Oasis: Supersonic (2016)
- Maradona (2018)
- Make Us Dream (2018)
- Formula 1: Drive to Survive (2019)
- Break Point (2023)
- Full Swing (2023)
- Six Nations: Full Contact (2024)
- Sprint: The World's Fastest Humans (2024)

== Awards and nominations ==
Year	Award	Category	Nominee(s)	Result	Ref.
2012	British Academy Film Awards	Outstanding British Film	Senna	Nominated	
2012	British Academy Film Awards	Best Documentary	Senna	Won	
2012	Producers Guild of America Awards	Outstanding Producer of Documentary Theatrical Motion Pictures	Senna	Nominated	
2016	Academy Awards	Best Documentary Feature Film	Amy	Won	
2016	British Academy Film Awards	Outstanding British Film	Amy	Nominated	
2016	British Academy Film Awards	Best Documentary	Amy	Won	
2016	Grammy Awards	Best Music Film	Amy	Won	
2016	Producers Guild of America Awards	Outstanding Producer of Documentary Theatrical Motion Pictures	Amy	Won	
2022	Sports Emmy Awards	Outstanding Documentary Series – Serialized	Formula 1: Drive to Survive	Won	
