= The Netflix Cup =

2023 television event hosted by Netflix

- Genre: Reality TV
- Created by: Netflix
- Country of origin: United States
- Original language: English
- No. of seasons: 1
- No. of episodes: 1

Production
- Producer: Stephanie Carpenter
- Running time: 2 hours 29 minutes
- Production companies: Excel Sports Management; Full Day Productions; BZ Entertainment

Original release
- Network: Netflix
- Release: 14 November 2023

The Netflix Cup was a one-off television event hosted by Netflix, featuring a crossover competition between Formula 1 drivers and professional golfers. It was held on November 14, 2023, at the Wynn Golf Club in Las Vegas, coinciding with the 2023 Las Vegas Grand Prix.

== Overview ==
The event brought together stars from Netflix's popular sports series 'Drive to Survive' and 'Full Swing'. It involved pairings of Formula 1 drivers Lando Norris, Carlos Sainz, Alex Albon and Pierre Gasly with notable golfers Rickie Fowler, Justin Thomas, Tony Finau, and Max Homa. Collin Morikawa was scheduled to compete, however had to pull out due to injury.

== Format ==
The competition format included eight holes of match play with each team facing unique challenges. This was followed by a playoff hole to determine the winner. The event was broadcast live on Netflix and was available for streaming post-event.

== Teams ==
Matches
Team 1	Team 2	Holes
Lando Norris & Rickie Fowler	Carlos Sainz & Justin Thomas	Holes 1-8
Pierre Gasly & Tony Finau	Alex Albon & Max Homa	Holes 1-8
Pierre Gasly & Tony Finau	Carlos Sainz & Justin Thomas	Hole 9

== Reception ==
The Netflix Cup was met with mixed reactions. Some appreciated the innovative crossover between motorsports and golf, while others criticized it for not meeting expectations.

The event gathered 700,000 views between its live debut and its first six weeks on Netflix, making it one of the year's least-watched "higher-profile" Netflix productions.
