= Cinema Audio Society Award for Outstanding Achievement in Sound Mixing for Television Non Fiction, Variety or Music – Series or Specials =

Annual US television award

- Country: United States
- Presented by: Cinema Audio Society
- Currently held by: Peter Sutton, Brent Burge, Alexis Feodoroff, Michael Hedges, Sam Okell, Michael Donaldson – The Beatles: Get Back (2021)

The Cinema Audio Society Award for Outstanding Achievement in Sound Mixing for Television Non Fiction, Variety or Music – Series or Specials is an annual award given by the Cinema Audio Society to sound mixers for their outstanding achievements in sound mixing for non fiction, variety or music series/specials television productions.

== Winners and nominees ==
=== 1990s ===
Year	Program	Episode(s)	Nominees	Network
1999 (7th)	Annie		Terry O'Bright, Keith Rogers (re-recording mixers), Edward L. Moskowitz (production mixer)	ABC
1999 (7th)	The Latin Beat		Ken Hahn (re-recording mixer), Joe Biscotti (production mixer)	ABC
1999 (7th)	Great Performances	"Crazy for You"	Ken Hahn, Jay David Saks (re-recording mixers), David Hewitt, Bill King (production mixers)	PBS
1999 (7th)	41st Annual Grammy Awards		John Harris, Don Worsham, Randy Ezratty, Bob La Masney (re-recording mixers), Ed Greene (production mixer)	CBS

=== 2000s ===
Year	Program	Episode(s)	Nominees	Network
2000 (8th)	The Beatles Revolution		Ken Hahn, David Jaunai, Ashley Howe (re-recording mixers)	ABC
2000 (8th)	Good Grief, Charlie Brown: A Tribute to Charles Schulz		Michael Ruschak (re-recording mixer)	CBS
2000 (8th)	Napoleon	"To Destiny"	Ken Hahn (re-recording mixer), Jean-Luc Verdier, Roger Phenix (production mixers)	PBS
2000 (8th)	On Our Own Terms: Moyers on Dying	"Living with Dying"	Grant Maxwell (re-recording mixer), David Gladstone (production mixer)	PBS
2000 (8th)	No Way Out: The Fall of Saigon		Michael Clark, Claes Nystrom (re-recording mixers), Steve Bedaux (production mixer)	MSNBC
2001 (9th)	When Dinosaurs Roamed America		Mike Olman, Liz Sroka, Jeff Septoff, David Torkanowsky	Discovery Channel
2001 (9th)	2001 MTV Video Music Awards		John Harris, Jay Vicari, Klaus Landsberg	MTV
2001 (9th)	Bill Moyers Reports: Earth on Edge		Grant Maxwell, Heidi Hesse, Roger Phenix, Tom Ewing	PBS
2001 (9th)	VH1 Divas Live: The One and Only Aretha Franklin		Bob Wright, Al Centrella	VH1
2001 (9th)	Wingspan		Grant Maxwell, Howie Nicol, Nick Robertson, Sean O'Neil, Jonathan Mitchell	
2002 (10th)	XIX Winter Olympics Opening Ceremony		Ed Greene (music/production mixer), Patrick Baltzell (sound/production mixer), Shawn Murphy, Joel Iwataki, David Greene (pre-production music mixers)	NBC
2002 (10th)	Great Performances: Dance in America	"From Broadway: Fosse"	Ken Hahn, Jay David Saks (re-recording mixers), Bill King (production mixer)	PBS
2002 (10th)	9/11		Ken Hahn, Grant Maxwell, Danny Caccavo (re-recording mixers)	CBS
2002 (10th)	In Memoriam: New York City		Ken Hahn (re-recording mixer), Larry Rock (production mixer)	HBO
2002 (10th)	Robin Williams: Live on Broadway		Ish Garcia	HBO
2003 (11th)	The Blues	"The Road to Memphis"	Gary C. Bourgeois, Tateum Kohut (re-recording mixers), Steuart Pearce (production mixer)	PBS
2003 (11th)	Bruce Springsteen & the E Street Band: Live in Barcelona		John Cooper (production mixer), Brendan O'Brien, Nick Didia, Kark Egsieker, Bill Bowers, Craig Taylor, David Ashton (re-recording mixers), Matt Foglia (surround sound mixer)	CBS
2003 (11th)	45th Annual Grammy Awards		Ed Greene, Don Worsham, Randy Ezratty (production mixers), John Harris, Jay Vicari (music mixers), Dick Maitland (sweetening mixer), Dirk Vanoucek (pro-tools mixer), Mikael Stewart, Ron Reaves (pa mixers)	CBS
2003 (11th)	The Kennedy Center Honors: A Celebration of the Performing Arts		Ed Greene (audio mixer), Dave Hurley (pre-production mixer), Bob La Masney (sweetening mixer)	CBS
2003 (11th)	American Experience	"New York: Center of the World"	Dominick Tavella, Mark Mandler (re-recording mixers), John Zecca (production mixer)	PBS
2004 (12th)	Great Performances	"Carnegie Hall Opening Night 2004"	David Hewitt, Jay David Saks (audio mixers), Ken Hahn (re-recording mixer)	PBS
2004 (12th)	A Christmas Carol		Mac Ruth (production mixer), Gary C. Bourgeois, Beau Borders (re-recording mixers)	NBC
2004 (12th)	American Experience	"RFK"	Roger Phenix, John Jenkins (sound mixers), Ken Hahn (re-recording mixer), Joe Hettinger (audio mixer)	PBS
2004 (12th)	Phish: It		Elliot Scheiner (music mixer/stereo and surround), Matt Foglia (re-recording mixer)	PBS
2004 (12th)	Secrets of Pearl Harbour		Grace Atkins, Mike Bacon (production mixers), Mike Olman, Kenneth Kobett (re-recording mixers)	Discovery
2005 (13th)	Bruce Springsteen and the E Street Band: Hammersmith Odeon, London '75		Bob Ludwig (mastering engineer), Bob Clearmountain (music mixer), Matt Foglia (re-recording mixer)	
2005 (13th)	Alien Planet		Mike Olman, Kenneth Kobett (re-recording mixers), Doug Rutherford (original dialogue recording)	Discovery
2005 (13th)	American Masters	"Sweet Honey in the Rock: Raise Your Voice"	Ken Hahn (re-recording mixer), J.T. Takagi (production mixer)	PBS
2005 (13th)	Unforgivable Blackness: The Rise and Fall of Jack Johnson		Dominick Tavella (re-recording mixer), Brenda Ray (sound recording), John Osborne (location sound recording), Lou Verrico (voice-over-recording)	PBS
2005 (13th)	Red Flag: Thunder at Nellis		Mike Olman, Kenneth Kobett (re-recording mixers), Rob Polhemus (production mixer), Doug Rutherford (original dialogue recording)	Discovery
2006 (14th)	Paul McCartney: The Space Within US		Matt Foglia (re-recording mixer), David Kahne (music mixer)	A&E
2006 (14th)	Great Performances	"South Pacific in Concert from Carnegie Hall"	Ken Hahn (re-recording mixer), Jay David Saks (re-recording mixer), David Hewitt (location sound mixer), Bill King (location sound recording)	PBS
2006 (14th)	NOVΛ	"The Great Robot Race"	Susan Hartford (re-recording mixer), Chris Strollo, Scott Harber, Doug Dunderdale (production mixers)	PBS
2006 (14th)	Deadliest Catch	"Cashin In"	Bob Bronow (re-recording mixer)	Discovery
2006 (14th)	Into the Storm	"Going South"	Bob Bronow (re-recording mixer)	Discovery
2007 (15th)	Metropolitan Opera Live in HD	"Mozart's The Magic Flute"	Bill King (production mixer), Jay David Saks (music mixer-live performance), Ken Hahn, John Bowen (re-recording mixers)	PBS
2007 (15th)	A&E Rocks: Bon Jovi		Obie O'Brien (audio/stereo/5.1 mixer)	A&E
2007 (15th)	Deadliest Catch	"The Unforgiving Sea"	Bob Bronow (re-recording mixer)	Discovery
2007 (15th)	Faces of Earth	"A Human World"	Aaron Mason (adr mixer), Mike Olman, Kenneth Kobett (re-recording mixers)	Science Channel
2007 (15th)	The War	"When Things Get Tough"	Dominick Tavella (re-recording mixer), Lou Verrico (original dialog recording), Brenda Ray, Mark Roy (sound mixers)	PBS
2008 (16th)	Deadliest Catch	"No Mercy"	Bob Bronow (re-recording mixer)	Discovery
2008 (16th)	Great Performances	"Company: A Musical Comedy"	Jorge Silva (production mixer), Ken Hahn (re-recording mixer)	PBS
2008 (16th)	Steve Miller Band: Live from Chicago		Andy Johns (music mixer), Brian Slack (re-recording mixer)	PBS
2008 (16th)	Metropolitan Opera Live in HD	"Puccini: La Bohème"	Bill King (live production mixer), Jay David Saks (music mixer-live performance), Ken Hahn, John Bowen (re-recording mixers)	PBS
2008 (16th)	American Idol	"Finale"	Ed Greene (production mixer), Randy Faustino (music mixer), Andrew Fletcher (pa mixer), Mike Parker (monitor mixer), Gary Long (playback music mixer), Brian Riordan, Conner Moore (pre-production packages mixers), Christian Schrader (audience sweetener)	Fox
2009 (17th)	Deadliest Catch	"Stay Focused or Die"	Bob Bronow (re-recording mixer)	Discovery
2009 (17th)	NOVΛ	"Extreme Ice"	Paul James Zahnley (re-recording mixer), Dave Ruddick, Jeff Orlowski, Chris Strollo (production mixers)	PBS
2009 (17th)	Metropolitan Opera Live in HD	"Opening Night Gala Starring Renée Fleming"	Ken Hahn (re-recording mixer), Jay David Saks (music mixer), Jorge Silva (production mixer)	PBS
2009 (17th)	The National Parks: America's Best Idea	"The Spricture of Nature"	Dominick Tavella (re-recording mixer), Lou Verrico (adr mixer)	PBS
2009 (17th)	Woodstock: Now & Then		Ken Hahn (re-recording mixer), Jonathan Chiles, William Tzouris, Ryan Carroll (production mixers)	History, VH1

=== 2010s ===
Year	Program	Episode(s)	Nominees	Network
2010 (18th)	Deadliest Catch	"Redemption Day"	Bob Bronow (re-recording mixer)	Discovery
2010 (18th)	Baseball	"The Tenth Inning: Bottom of the Tenth"	Lou Verrico (production mixer), Dominick Tavella (re-recording mixer)	PBS
2010 (18th)	Genius Within: The Inner Life of Glenn Gould		Bruce Cameron (production mixer), Ian Rodness (re-recording mixer)	PBS
2010 (18th)	LennoNYC		Roger Phenix (production mixer), Ed Campbell (re-recording mixer)	PBS
2010 (18th)	Metropolitan Opera Live in HD	"Rossini: Armida"	Jay David Saks (music mixer-live performance), Ken Hahn (re-recording mixer)	PBS
2011 (19th)	Deadliest Catch	"New Blood"	Bob Bronow (re-recording mixer)	Discovery
2011 (19th)	Bobby Fischer Against the World		Mark Maloof (production sound), Bill Marino (re-recording mixer)	HBO
2011 (19th)	Lady Gaga Presents the Monster Ball Tour: At Madison Square Garden		John Harris (production mixer), Brian Riordan (re-recording mixer)	HBO
2011 (19th)	American Experience	"Triangle Fire"	G. John Garrett, Rick Angelella, Everett Wong (production mixers), Coll Anderson (re-recording mixer)	PBS
2011 (19th)	Metropolitan Opera Live in HD	"John Adams: Nixon in China"	Ken Hahn (re-recording mixer), Jay David Saks (music mixer)	PBS
2012 (20th)	2012 Rock and Roll Hall of Fame Induction Ceremony		Brian Riordan (re-recording mixer), James Ledner (re-recording mixer)	HBO
2012 (20th)	Deadliest Catch	"I Don't Wanna Die"	Bob Bronow (re-recording mixer)	Discovery
2012 (20th)	Frozen Planet	"To the Ends of the Earth"	Archie Moore (production mixer), Graham Wild (re-recording mixer)	Discovery
2012 (20th)	Sound Tracks: Music Without Borders		Paul James Zahnley (re-recording mixer)	PBS
2012 (20th)	Metropolitan Opera Live in HD	"Donizetti: Anna Bolena"	Ken Hahn (production mixer), Jay David Saks (music mixer)	PBS
2013 (21st)	History of the Eagles		Tom Fleischman (re-recording mixer), Elliot Scheiner (re-recording mixer)	Showtime
2013 (21st)	Deadliest Catch	"The Final Battle"	Bob Bronow (re-recording mixer)	Discovery
2013 (21st)	Mike Tyson: Undisputed Truth		Mathew Price (production mixer), Michael Barry (re-recording mixer)	HBO
2013 (21st)	2013 Rock and Roll Hall of Fame Induction Ceremony		Michael Minkler (re-recording mixer), Greg Townsend (mixer), Jay Vicari (music recording mixer), John Harris (musix mix down)	HBO
2013 (21st)	Killing Lincoln		William Britt (production mixer), Stanley Kastner (re-recording mixer)	Nat Geo
2014 (22nd)	Foo Fighters: Sonic Highways	"Los Angeles"	Eddie Kim (re-recording mixer), Jeffrey Fuller (re-recording mixer)	HBO
2014 (22nd)	Cosmos: A Spacetime Odyssey	"Standing Up in the Milky Way"	Darryl L. Frank (production mixer), Mark Hensley, Joel D. Catalan (re-recording mixers), Paul Aronoff (adr mixer), David Torres (foley mixer)	Fox
2014 (22nd)	The Roosevelts: An Intimate History	"The Fire of Life"	Dominick Tavella (re-recording mixer), Lou Verrico (pre-production mixer)	PBS
2014 (22nd)	Deadliest Catch	"Lost at Sea"	Bob Bronow (re-recording mixer)	Discovery
2014 (22nd)	2014 Rock and Roll Hall of Fame Induction Ceremony		Brian Riordan, James Ledner (re-recording mixers), Jay Vicari, Bob Clearmountain (music mixers)	HBO
2015 (23rd)	Danny Elfman's Music from the Films of Tim Burton		Ken Hahn (re-recording mixer), Paul Bevan (production mixer/house sound)	PBS
2015 (23rd)	Anthony Bourdain: Parts Unknown	"Madagascar"	Benny Mouthon (re-recording mixer)	CNN
2015 (23rd)	Kurt Cobain: Montage of Heck		Steve Pederson (re-recording mixer), Cameron Frankley (re-recording mixer)	HBO
2015 (23rd)	Deadliest Catch	"Lunatic Fringe"	Bob Bronow (re-recording mixer)	Discovery
2015 (23rd)	Keith Richards: Under the Influence		Scott R. Lewis (re-recording mixer), Eddie O'Connor (production mixer), Michael Emery (production mixer), Dennis Hamlin (production mixer)	Netflix
2016 (24th)	Grease: Live		J. Mark King (production mixer), Biff Dawes (music mixer), Eric Johnston (playback and sound effects mixer), Pablo Munguia (Pro Tools playback music mixer)	Fox
2016 (24th)	Anthony Bourdain: Parts Unknown	"Hanoi"	Benny Mouthon (re-recording mixer)	CNN
2016 (24th)	We Will Rise: Michelle Obama's Mission to Educate Girls Around the World		Rich Cutler (re-recording mixer)	CNN
2016 (24th)	Deadliest Catch	"The Widowmaker - Part 1"	Bob Bronow (re-recording mixer)	Discovery
2016 (24th)	Mars	"Novo Mondo"	Christopher Barnett, Roy Waldspurger (re-recording mixers), Jason Butler (foley mixer)	Nat Geo
2017 (25th)	Rolling Stone: Stories from the Edge		David Hocs, Tom Tierney (production mixers), Tom Fleischman (re-recording mixer)	HBO
2017 (25th)	American Experience	"The Great War: Part 3"	John Jenkins (production mixer), Ken Hahn (re-recording mixer)	PBS
2017 (25th)	Anthony Bourdain: Parts Unknown	"Oman"	Benny Mouthon (re-recording mixer)	CNN
2017 (25th)	Deadliest Catch	"Last Damn Arctic Snow"	John Warrin (re-recording mixer)	Discovery
2017 (25th)	Who Killed Tupac?	"Murder in Vegas"	Steve Birchmeier (production mixer), John Reese (re-recording mixer)	A&E
2018 (26th)	Anthony Bourdain: Parts Unknown	"Bhutan"	Benny Mouthon (re-recording mixer)	CNN
2018 (26th)	Deadliest Catch	"Blood & Water"	Bob Bronow (re-recording mixer)	Discovery
2018 (26th)	Jesus Christ Superstar Live in Concert		Tom Holmes (production mixer), Brian Flanzbaum, Christian Schrader, Ellen Fitton (re-recording mixers), John Harris (scoring mixer), Anthony Lalumia (adr mixer)	NBC
2018 (26th)	The Late Late Show Carpool Karaoke Primetime Special		Bill Kaplan, Scott Smolev, Timothy Murphy (production mixers), Chris Maddalone (foldback mixer), Otto Svoboda (scoring mixer)	CBS
2018 (26th)	The Late Show with Stephen Colbert		Pierre DeLaforcade (production mixer), Tom Herrmann (front of house mixer), Alan Bonomo (monitor mixer), Harvey Goldberg (scoring mixer)	CBS
2019 (27th)	David Bowie: Finding Fame		Sean O'Neil (production mixer), Greg Gettens (re-recording mixer)	Showtime
2019 (27th)	Country Music	"Will the Circle Be Unbroken? (1968-1972)"	Mark Roy (production mixer), Dominick Tavella, Chris Chae (re-recording mixers)	PBS
2019 (27th)	Deadliest Catch	"Sixty Feet Monster"	Bob Bronow (re-recording mixer)	Discovery
2019 (27th)	Formula 1: Drive to Survive	"The Next Generation"	Nick Fry, Steve Speed, James Evans (re-recording mixers)	Netflix
2019 (27th)	Hitsville: The Making of Motown		Pete Orlanski (production mixer), Richard Kondal (re-recording mixer), Eduard Zemlianoi (foley mixer)	Showtime

=== 2020s ===
Year	Program	Episode(s)	Nominees	Network
2020 (28th)	Hamilton		Justin Rathbun, production mixer; Tony Volante, Rob Fernandez, Tim Latham, re-recording mixers	Disney+
2020 (28th)	Beastie Boys Story		Jacob Feinberg, William Tzouris, production mixers; Martyn Zub, re-recording mixer	Apple TV+
2020 (28th)	Bruce Springsteen's Letter to You		Brad Bergdom, production mixer; Kevin O'Connell, Kyle Arzt, re-recording mixers; Bob Clearmountain, music mixer	Apple TV+
2020 (28th)	Laurel Canyon: A Place in Time		Gary A. Rizzo, Stephen Urata, Danielle Dupre, Tony Villaflor, re-recording mixers; Dave Lynch, scoring mixer	Epix
2020 (28th)	NASA & SpaceX: Journey to the Future		Erik Clabeaux, production mixer; Michael Keeley, re-recording mixer	Discovery
2021 (29th)	The Beatles: Get Back	"Part 3"	Peter Sutton (production mixer); Brent Burge, Alexis Feodoroff, Michael Hedges (re-recording mixers); Sam Okell (scoring mixer); Michael Donaldson (foley mixer)	Disney+
2021 (29th)	Billie Eilish: The World's a Little Blurry		Jae Kim (production mixer); Jason Gaya, Elmo Ponsdomenech (re-recording mixers); Aron Forbes (scoring mixer); Jeffrey Roy (adr mixer); Shawn Kennelly (foley mixer)	Apple TV+
2021 (29th)	Bo Burnham: Inside		Bo Burnham (production mixer), Joel Dougherty (re-recording mixer)	Netflix
2021 (29th)	Formula 1: Drive to Survive	"Man on Fire"	Doug Dreger (production mixer); Nick Fry, Scott Speed (re-recording mixers)	Netflix
2021 (29th)	McCartney 3,2,1	"These Things Bring You Together"	Laura Cunningham (production mixer), Gary Rizzo (re-recording mixer)	Hulu
2022 (30th)	Formula 1: Drive to Survive	"Gloves Are Off"	Nick Fry, Steve Speed (re-recording mixers)	Netflix
2022 (30th)	Carole King & James Taylor: Just Call Out My Name		Danny Kortchmar (production mixer), Gary A. Rizzo (re-recording mixer)	HBO Max
2022 (30th)	George Carlin’s American Dream	"Part 1"	Paul Graff (production mixer); Earl Martin, Jason Gaya (re-recording mixers)	HBO
2022 (30th)	Lucy and Desi		Sabi Tulok (production mixer); Patrick Spain, John W. Rampey (re-recording mixers); Scott Sheppard (scoring mixer)	Prime Video
2022 (30th)	Obi-Wan Kenobi: A Jedi's Return		Richard Hays (production mixer), Danielle Dupre (re-recording mixer), Scott Michael Smith (scoring mixer)	Disney+
2023 (31st)	100 Foot Wave	"Lost at Sea"	Keith Hodne (production mixer)	HBO
2023 (31st)	Bono & The Edge: A Sort of Homecoming with Dave Letterman		Karl Merren (production mixer); Brian Riordan, Phil DeTolve (re-recording mixers); Jacknife Lee (scoring mixer)	Disney+
2023 (31st)	Formula 1: Drive to Survive	"Over the Limit"	Doug Dredger (production mixer); Nick Fry, Steve Speed (re-recording mixers)	Netflix
2023 (31st)	The Late Show with Stephen Colbert	"John Oliver; Broadway Cast of The Lion King"	Pierre de Laforcade (production mixer), Tom Herrmann (FoH mixer), Al Bonomo (monitor mixer), Harvey Goldberg (music mixer)	CBS
2023 (31st)	Welcome to Wrexham	"Ballers"	Mark Jensen (re-recording mixer)	FX

== See also ==
- Primetime Emmy Award for Outstanding Sound Mixing for a Nonfiction or Reality Program (Single or Multi-Camera)
- Primetime Emmy Award for Outstanding Sound Mixing for a Variety Series or Special
