= Cinema Audio Society Awards 2021 =

US film and television awards ceremony

58th Cinema Audio Society Awards

March 19, 2022

Motion Picture - Live Action:
Dune

The 58th Cinema Audio Society Awards were held on March 19, 2022, at the InterContinental in Los Angeles, to honor outstanding achievements in sound mixing in film and television of 2021. The nominations were announced on January 25, 2022.

== Winners and nominees ==
The winners are listed first and in bold.

=== Film ===
| Outstanding Achievement in Sound Mixing for a Motion Picture – Live Action | Outstanding Achievement in Sound Mixing for a Motion Picture – Animated |
|---|---|
| **Dune – Mac Ruth (production mixer); Ron Bartlett, Douglas Hemphill (re-recording mixers); Alan Meyerson (scoring mixer); Tommy O'Connell (ADR mixer); Don White (foley mixer)**; No Time to Die – Simon Hayes (production mixer); Paul Massey, Mark Taylor (re-recording mixers); Stephen Lipson (scoring mixer); Mark Appleby (ADR mixer); Adam Mendez (foley mixer); Spider-Man: No Way Home – Willie D. Burton (production mixer); Kevin O'Connell, Tony Lamberti (re-recording mixers); Warren Brown (scoring mixer); Howard London (ADR mixer); Randy K. Singer (foley mixer); The Power of the Dog – Richard Flynn (production mixer); Robert Mackenzie, Tara Webb (re-recording mixers); Graeme Stewart (scoring mixer); Steve Burgess (foley mixer); West Side Story – Tod Maitland (production mixer); Gary Rydstrom, Andy Nelson (re-recording mixers); Shawn Murphy (scoring mixer); Doc Kane (ADR mixer); Frank Rinella (foley mixer) | **Encanto – Paul McGrath (original dialogue mixer); David E. Fluhr, Gabriel Guy, David Boucher (re-recording mixers); Alvin Wee (scoring mixer); Doc Kane (ADR mixer); Scott Curtis (foley mixer)**; Luca – Vince Caro (original dialogue mixer); Christopher Scarabosio, Tony Villaflor (re-recording mixers); Greg Hayes (scoring mixer); Jason Butler, Richard Duarte (foley mixers); Raya and the Last Dragon – Paul McGrath (original dialogue mixer); David E. Fluhr, Gabriel Guy (re-recording mixers); Alan Meyerson (scoring mixer); Doc Kane (ADR mixer); Scott Curtis (foley mixer); Sing 2 – Edward Sutton (original dialogue mixer); Gary A. Rizzo, Juan Peralta (re-recording mixers); Alan Meyerson (scoring mixer); Robert Edwards (ADR mixer); Frank Rinella (foley mixer); The Mitchells vs. the Machines – Howard London, Aaron Hasson (original dialogue mixers); Tony Lamberti, Michael Semanick (re-recording mixers); Sanacore (foley mixer) |
Outstanding Achievement in Sound Mixing for a Motion Picture – Documentary
**Summer of Soul (...Or, When the Revolution Could Not Be Televised) – Paul Hsu, Roberto Fernandez, Paul Massey (re-recording mixers)**; Becoming Cousteau – Tony Volante (re-recording mixer); The Velvet Underground – Juliana Henao Mesa (production mixer); Leslie Shatz (re-recording mixer); Tina – Caleb A. Mose (production mixer); Lawrence Everson (re-recording mixer); Phil McGowan (scoring mixer); Val – Michael Haldin (production mixer); John Bolen (re-recording mixer); Garth Stevenson (scoring mixer); Mitch Dorf (ADR mixer)

=== Television ===
| Outstanding Achievement in Sound Mixing for Television Series – One Hour | Outstanding Achievement in Sound Mixing for Television Series – Half Hour |
|---|---|
| **Yellowstone: "Half the Money" – Andrejs Prokopenko (production mixer); Diego Gat, Samuel Ejnes (re-recording mixers); Michael Miller, Chris Navarro (ADR mixers) (Paramount Network)**; Squid Game: "VIPS" – Park Hyeon-Soo, Serge Perron (re-recording mixers); Cameron Sloan (ADR mixer) (Netflix); Succession: "Secession" – Ken Ishii (production mixer); Andy Kris, Nicholas Renbeck (re-recording mixers); Tommy Vicari (scoring mixer); Mark DeSimone (ADR mixer); Micah Blaichman (foley mixer) (HBO); The Morning Show: "My Least Favorite Year" – William B. Kaplan (production mixer); Elmo Ponsdomenech, Jason "Frenchie" Gaya (re-recording mixers); Carter Burwell (scoring mixer); Brian Smith (ADR mixer); James Howe (foley mixer) (Apple TV+); The White Lotus: "The Lotus Eaters" – Walter Anderson (production mixer); Christian Minkler, Ryan Collins (re-recording mixers); Jeffrey Roy (ADR mixer); Randy Wilson (foley mixer) (HBO) | **Ted Lasso: "Rainbow" – David Lascelles (production mixer); Ryan Kennedy, Sean Byrne (re-recording mixers); Brent Findley, Jamison Rabbe (ADR mixers); Arno Stephanian (foley mixer) (Apple TV+)**; Cobra Kai: "December 19" – Michael Filosa (production mixer); Joseph DeAngelis, Chris Carpenter (re-recording mixers); Phil McGowan (scoring mixer); Marilyn Morris (ADR mixer); Michael S. Head (foley mixer) (Netflix); Only Murders in the Building: "How Well Do You Know Your Neighbors?" – Joseph White Jr. (production mixer); Mathew Waters, Lindsay Alvarez (re-recording mixers); Alan DeMoss (scoring mixer); Stiv Schneider (ADR mixer); Karina Rezhevska (foley mixer) (Hulu); The Book of Boba Fett: "Chapter 1: Stranger in a Strange Land" – Shawn Holden (production mixer); Bonnie Wild, Scott R. Lewis (re-recording mixers); Alan Meyerson (scoring mixer); Richard Duarte (foley mixer) (Disney+); What We Do In The Shadows: "The Casino" – Rob Beal (production mixer); Diego Gat, Samuel Ejnes (re-recording mixers); Mike Tehrani (ADR mixer); Stacey Michaels (foley mixer) (FX) |
| Outstanding Achievement in Sound Mixing for a Non-Theatrical Motion Pictures or Limited Series | Outstanding Achievement in Sound Mixing for Television Non Fiction, Variety or Music – Series or Specials |
| **Mare of Easttown: "Sore Must Be The Storm" – Richard Bullock (production mixer); Joseph DeAngelis, Chris Carpenter (re-recording mixers) (HBO Max)**; Hawkeye: "Echoes" – Pud Cusack (production mixer); Thomas Myers, Danielle Dupre (re-recording mixers); Casey Stone (scoring mixer); Doc Kane (ADR mixer); Kevin Schultz (foley mixer) (Disney+); The Underground Railroad: "Chapter 10: Mabel" – Joseph White Jr. (production mixer); Onnalee Blank, Mathew Waters (re-recording mixers); Geoff Foster (scoring mixer); Kari Vahakuopus (foley mixer) (Amazon Prime Video); WandaVision: "Previously On" – Christopher Giles (production mixer); Danielle Dupre (re-recording mixer); Casey Stone (scoring mixer); Doc Kane (adr mixer); Frank Rinella (foley mixer) (Disney+); WandaVision: "The Series Finale" – Christopher Giles, Michael Piotrowski (production mixers); Danielle Dupre (re-recording mixer); Casey Stone (scoring mixer); Doc Kane (ADR mixer); Malcolm Fife (foley mixer) (Disney+) | **The Beatles: Get Back: "Part 3" – Peter Sutton (production mixer); Michael Hedges, Brent Burge, Alexis Feodoroff (re-recording mixers); Sam Okell (music mixer); Michael Donaldson (foley mixer) (Disney+)**; Billie Eilish: The World's A Little Blurry – Jae Kim (production mixer); Elmo Ponsdomenech, Jason "Frenchie" Gaya (re-recording mixers); Aron Forbes (scoring mixer); Jeffrey Roy (ADR mixer); Shawn Kennelly (foley mixer) (Apple TV+); Bo Burnham: Inside – Bo Burnham (production mixer); Joel Dougherty (re-recording mixer) (Netflix); Formula 1: Drive to Survive: "Man on Fire" – Doug Dreger (production mixer); Nick Fry, Steve Speed (re-recording mixers) (Netflix); McCartney 3,2,1: "These Things Bring You Together" – Laura Cunningham (production mixer); Gary A. Rizzo (re-recording mixer) (Hulu) |

=== Special awards ===
Filmmaker Award

- **Ridley Scott**

Career Achievement Award

- **Paul Massey**
