= Full Swing (2023 TV series) =

American documentary television series

- Genre: Docudrama
- Composer: H. Scott Salinas
- Country of origin: United States
- Original language: English
- No. of seasons: 4
- No. of episodes: 27

Production
- Executive producers: Chad Mumm; James Gay-Rees; Paul Martin; Warren Smith; Mark W. Olsen; Michael Riceman; Chris Wandell
- Editors: Sam Billinge; Victoria Simpson
- Running time: 40–49 minutes
- Production companies: Vox Media Studios; Box to Box Films

Original release
- Network: Netflix
- Release: February 15, 2023 – present

Full Swing is a television documentary series produced in a collaboration between Netflix and PGA Tour to give a behind-the-scenes look at the players and tournaments of the PGA Tour. In March 2023, Netflix renewed the series for a second season. A crossover event with Formula 1: Drive to Survive broadcast in November 2023 called The Netflix Cup.

== Cast ==
- Jordan Spieth
- Justin Thomas
- Brooks Koepka
- Scottie Scheffler
- Ian Poulter
- Joel Dahmen
- Matt Fitzpatrick
- Dustin Johnson
- Tony Finau
- Collin Morikawa
- Sahith Theegala
- Rory McIlroy
- Cameron Young
- Rickie Fowler
- Mito Pereira
- Tom Kim

== Episodes ==
Series overview
Season	Episodes	Originally released
1	8	February 15, 2023
2	8	March 6, 2024
3	7	February 25, 2025
4	4	April 17, 2026

=== Season 1 (2023) ===
No. overall	No. in season	Title	Original release date
1	1	"Frenemies"	February 15, 2023
2	2	"Win or Go Home"	February 15, 2023
3	3	"Money or Legacy"	February 15, 2023
4	4	"Imposter Syndrome"	February 15, 2023
5	5	"American Dreams"	February 15, 2023
6	6	"Don't Get Bitter, Get Better"	February 15, 2023
7	7	"Golf is Hard"	February 15, 2023
8	8	"Everything Has Led to This"	February 15, 2023

=== Season 2 (2024) ===
No. overall	No. in season	Title	Original release date
9	1	"The Game Has Changed Part 1"	March 6, 2024
10	2	"The Game Has Changed Part 2"	March 6, 2024
11	3	"Mind Game"	March 6, 2024
12	4	"Prove It"	March 6, 2024
13	5	"In the Shadows"	March 6, 2024
14	6	"Pick Six"	March 6, 2024
15	7	"All Roads Lead to Rome Part 1"	March 6, 2024
16	8	"All Roads Lead to Rome Part 2"	March 6, 2024

=== Season 3 (2025) ===
No. overall	No. in season	Title	Original release date
17	1	"A Brave New Game"	February 25, 2025
18	2	"Through Thick and Thin"	February 25, 2025
19	3	"Don't Call It a Comeback"	February 25, 2025
20	4	"Carrying the Burden"	February 25, 2025
21	5	"Two Tickets to Paris"	February 25, 2025
22	6	"Last Shot"	February 25, 2025
23	7	"Rebirth"	February 25, 2025

=== Season 4 (2026) ===
No. overall	No. in season	Title	Original release date
24	1	"Unfinished Business"	April 17, 2026
25	2	"The Outsiders"	April 17, 2026
26	3	"One Shot at History"	April 17, 2026
27	4	"The Last Stand"	April 17, 2026

== See also ==
- List of Netflix original programming
