= McCartney 3, 2, 1 =

2021 American documentary miniseries

- Genre: Documentary
- Written by: Mark Monroe
- Directed by: Zachary Heinzerling
- Starring: Paul McCartney; Rick Rubin
- Country of origin: United States
- Original language: English
- No. of episodes: 6

Production
- Executive producers: Paul McCartney; Rick Rubin; Scott Rodger; Peter Berg; Matthew Goldberg; Brandon Carroll; Jeff Pollack; Frank Marshall; Ryan Suffern
- Producers: Leila Mattimore; Joanna Forscher; Chloe Chapman; Paul Crowder; Eric Lynn; Mark Monroe
- Cinematography: Stuart Winecoff
- Editors: Paul Crowder; Lorian James Delman; Paul Snyder; Joshua Altman
- Running time: 27–31 minutes
- Production companies: Endeavor Content; MPL Communications; Shangri-La; Film 45; The Kennedy/Marshall Company; Diamond Docs

Original release
- Network: Hulu
- Release: July 16, 2021

McCartney 3, 2, 1 is an American documentary television miniseries starring English musician Paul McCartney and American producer Rick Rubin. The six-part series features the pair discussing McCartney's career, from the Beatles and Wings to his time as a solo artist. It was digitally released by Hulu on July 16, 2021.

== Premise ==
The series features a sit-down between Paul McCartney and music producer Rick Rubin, as the pair discuss McCartney's early life, work with the Beatles, Wings, and his 50 years as a solo artist. The series also covers the songwriting, influences, and personal relationships that formed McCartney's songs.

== Episodes ==
No.	Title	Original release date
1	"These Things Bring You Together"	July 16, 2021
Paul McCartney talks about his early years in the music industry, including his boyhood friendships with John Lennon and George Harrison.
2	"The Notes that Like Each Other"	July 16, 2021
McCartney discusses his influences, ranging from Johann Sebastian Bach to Fela Kuti.
3	"The People We Loved Were Loving Us"	July 16, 2021
McCartney lists musicians that inspired the Beatles, as well as their formative experiences traveling in India.
4	"Like Professors in a Laboratory"	July 16, 2021
McCartney and Rubin break-down the methods the Beatles used to challenge musical conventions.
5	"Couldn't You Play it Straighter?"	July 16, 2021
McCartney discusses the transformations in his bands' colors and sound through the years.
6	"The Long and Winding Road"	July 16, 2021
Rubin and McCartney go through McCartney's journey as a songwriter and artist, as well as the significance of his partnership with John Lennon.

== Release ==
The series was announced on May 17, 2021, and digitally released via Hulu on July 16, 2021. The trailer was released a week before the series' debut, on July 9. Internationally, the series premiered on Disney+ on August 25, 2021.

== Reception ==
=== Critical response ===
Review aggregator Rotten Tomatoes reported an approval rating of 97% based on 33 reviews, with an average rating of 8.7/10. The website's critics consensus reads, "Casual listeners' mileage may vary, but audiophiles and Beatles devotees will love seeing Sir Paul McCartney and producer Rick Rubin come together to talk shop." Metacritic gave the series a weighted average score of 85 out of 100 based on 14 critic reviews, indicating "universal acclaim".

Steve Green of IndieWire gave the film a grade of "A−" and wrote: "There's an electricity in the music itself, paired with Rubin and McCartney's parallel reactions to discoveries buried deep in these song mixes, that the show almost doesn't need that added visual momentum. But Heinzerling has a deft touch for when and where to augment the proceedings with an extra light show or to turn McCartney himself into a dolly track pivot point." Writing for Variety, Chris Willman said: "McCartney 3, 2, 1 is such an unerring delight that it sets a very high bar for Beatlemania satiation this year. Not because it's that artfully created or brilliantly hosted, but maybe because it doesn't aspire to impress anyone with anything except how effortlessly it prompts the most talented musician of the last century to empty out a good portion of his brainpan for public perusal." Stuart Jeffries of The Guardian rated the documentary 4 out of 5 stars, writing, "This bounteous feast for Beatles fans sees Paul McCartney dive into the back catalogue with producer Rick Rubin – who then does something truly amazing." Martin Brown of Common Sense Media rated the miniseries 3 out of 5 stars, and praised the depiction of positive messages and role models, citing creativity, thoughtfulness, and compassion.

=== Accolades ===
Year	Award	Category	Nominee(s)	Result	Ref.
2021	Golden Reel Awards	Outstanding Achievement in Sound Editing – Non-Theatrical Documentary	Jonathan Greber, Leff Lefferts, E. Larry Oatfield, Bjorn Ole Schroeder, and Kim Foscato	Nominated	
2021	Cinema Audio Society Awards	Outstanding Achievement in Sound Mixing for Television Non Fiction, Variety or Music – Series or Specials	Laura Cunningham and Gary A. Rizzo (for "These Things Bring You Together")	Nominated	
2022	Hollywood Critics Association TV Awards	Best Streaming Docuseries or Non-Fiction Series	McCartney 3, 2, 1	Nominated	
2022	Primetime Creative Arts Emmy Awards	Outstanding Cinematography for a Nonfiction Program	Stuart Winecoff (for "These Things Bring You Together")	Nominated	
2022	Primetime Creative Arts Emmy Awards	Outstanding Sound Editing for a Nonfiction or Reality Program (Single or Multi-Camera)	Jonathan Greber, Leff Lefferts, Bjorn Ole Schroeder, E. Larry Oatfield, and Kim Foscato (for "The People We Loved Were Loving Us!")	Nominated	
2022	Primetime Creative Arts Emmy Awards	Outstanding Sound Mixing for a Nonfiction or Reality Program (Single or Multi-Camera)	Gary A. Rizzo and Laura Cunningham (for "These Things Bring You Together")	Nominated	
