= Formula 1: Drive to Survive =

Documentary television series

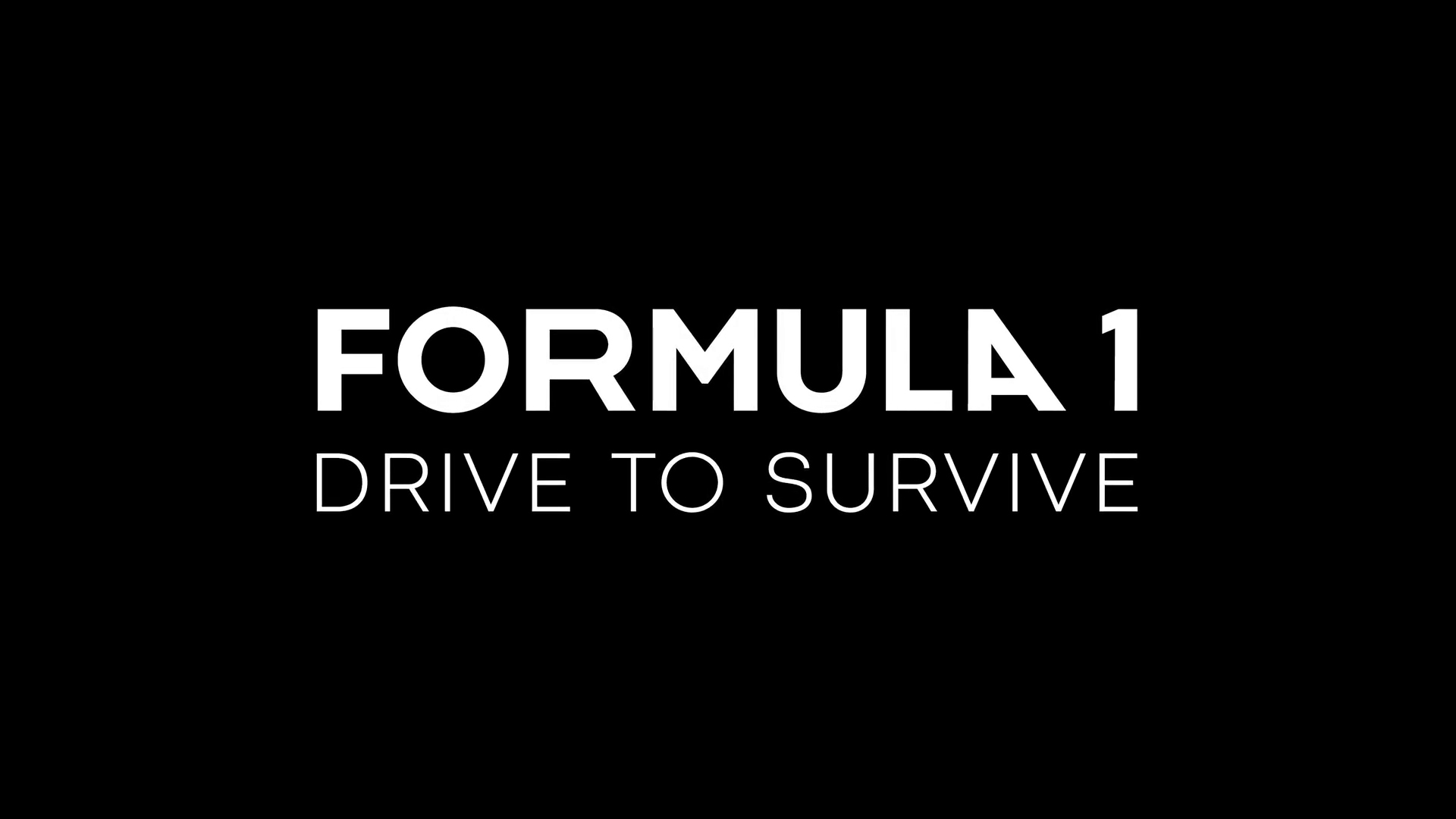
- Genre: Docudrama
- Original language: English
- No. of seasons: 8
- No. of episodes: 78

Production
- Executive producers: James Gay-Rees; Paul Martin
- Running time: 27–51 minutes
- Production companies: Box to Box Films; Formula One Management

Original release
- Network: Netflix
- Release: 8 March 2019 – present
- Network: Apple TV (United States)
- Release: 27 February 2026

Formula 1: Drive to Survive is a British television documentary series produced by Netflix in collaboration with Formula One. The series provided a behind-the-scenes look at the drivers, teams, and races along with the intense rivalries that drive the Formula One Championship. Since premiering in 2019, the show has released a total of eight seasons with the latest season being aired on 27 February 2026. The popularity of the show led to crossover events such as The Netflix Cup with Full Swing which was broadcast on Netflix in November 2023.

== Production and concept ==
The series was first announced on 24 March 2018, when Formula 1 had officially confirmed that they would be collaborating with Netflix for a ten-episode series. The main goal was to give fans exclusive access into the 2018 World Championship. However, before the series became the worldwide hit that is today it looked quite different. James Gay-Rees the executive producer revealed on the Fast Lane Podcast that the series was meant to focus only on Red Bull Racing, however it eventually covered the entire grid. By 24 July 2019, a second season was officially confirmed for 2020.

During the 2020 season the filming was suspended from March up until July due to the COVID-19 pandemic. As time passes the show continues to release new episodes every year that focus on the past racing seasons. Netflix and Apple announced a collaboration on February 26, 2026. Because Apple will be the U.S broadcaster for Formula 1 in 2026, the two companies decided to swap content to help reach even more viewers. Drive to Survive was made available on Apple TV, and in return Netflix was able to officially stream a live race, the 2026 Canadian Grand Prix for U.S subscribers.

In August 2026, Netflix confirmed that the show would be returning for a ninth season in February 2027.

== Episodes ==
Series	Episodes	Originally released	Network
1	10	8 March 2019	Netflix
2	10	28 February 2020	Netflix
3	10	19 March 2021	Netflix
4	10	11 March 2022	Netflix
5	10	24 February 2023	Netflix
6	10	23 February 2024	Netflix
7	10	7 March 2025	Netflix
8	8	27 February 2026	Apple TV (United States), Netflix
9	TBD	February 2027	Netflix

=== Season 1 (2019) ===
No. overall	No. in season	Title	Original release date
1	1	"All to Play For"	8 March 2019
2	2	"The King of Spain"	8 March 2019
3	3	"Redemption"	8 March 2019
4	4	"The Art of War"	8 March 2019
5	5	"Trouble at the Top"	8 March 2019
6	6	"All or Nothing"	8 March 2019
7	7	"Keeping Your Head"	8 March 2019
8	8	"The Next Generation"	8 March 2019
9	9	"Stars and Stripes"	8 March 2019
10	10	"Crossing the Line"	8 March 2019

=== Season 2 (2020) ===
No. overall	No. in season	Title	Original release date
11	1	"Lights Out"	28 February 2020
12	2	"Boiling Point"	28 February 2020
13	3	"Dogfight"	28 February 2020
14	4	"Dark Days"	28 February 2020
15	5	"Great Expectations"	28 February 2020
16	6	"Raging Bulls"	28 February 2020
17	7	"Seeing Red"	28 February 2020
18	8	"Musical Chairs"	28 February 2020
19	9	"Blood, Sweat & Tears"	28 February 2020
20	10	"Checkered Flag"	28 February 2020

=== Season 3 (2021) ===
No. overall	No. in season	Title	Original release date
21	1	"Cash Is King"	19 March 2021
22	2	"Back On Track"	19 March 2021
23	3	"Nobody's Fool"	19 March 2021
24	4	"We Need to Talk About Ferrari"	19 March 2021
25	5	"The End of the Affair"	19 March 2021
26	6	"The Comeback Kid"	19 March 2021
27	7	"Guenther's Choice"	19 March 2021
28	8	"No Regrets"	19 March 2021
29	9	"Man On Fire"	19 March 2021
30	10	"Down to the Wire"	19 March 2021

=== Season 4 (2022) ===
No. overall	No. in season	Title	Original release date
31	1	"Clash of the Titans"	11 March 2022
32	2	"Ace in the Hole"	11 March 2022
33	3	"Tipping Point"	11 March 2022
34	4	"A Mountain to Climb"	11 March 2022
35	5	"Staying Alive"	11 March 2022
36	6	"A Point to Prove"	11 March 2022
37	7	"Growing Pains"	11 March 2022
38	8	"Dances With Wolff"	11 March 2022
39	9	"Gloves are Off"	11 March 2022
40	10	"Hard Racing"	11 March 2022

=== Season 5 (2023) ===
No. overall	No. in season	Title	Original release date
41	1	"The New Dawn"	24 February 2023
42	2	"Bounce Back"	24 February 2023
43	3	"Matter of Principal"	24 February 2023
44	4	"Like Father, Like Son?"	24 February 2023
45	5	"Pardon My French"	24 February 2023
46	6	"Nice Guys Finish Last"	24 February 2023
47	7	"Hot Seat"	24 February 2023
48	8	"Alpha Male"	24 February 2023
49	9	"Over The Limit"	24 February 2023
50	10	"End of the Road"	24 February 2023

=== Season 6 (2024) ===
No. overall	No. in season	Title	Original release date
51	1	"Money Talks"	23 February 2024
52	2	"Fall from Grace"	23 February 2024
53	3	"Under Pressure"	23 February 2024
54	4	"The Last Chapter"	23 February 2024
55	5	"Civil War"	23 February 2024
56	6	"Leap of Faith"	23 February 2024
57	7	"C’est la Vie"	23 February 2024
58	8	"Forza Ferrari"	23 February 2024
59	9	"Three's a Crowd"	23 February 2024
60	10	"Red or Black"	23 February 2024

=== Season 7 (2025) ===
No. overall	No. in season	Title	Original release date
61	1	"Business as Usual"	7 March 2025
62	2	"Frenemies"	7 March 2025
63	3	"Looking Out for Number 1"	7 March 2025
64	4	"Carlos Signs"	7 March 2025
65	5	"Le Curse of Leclerc"	7 March 2025
66	6	"Wheels of Fortune"	7 March 2025
67	7	"In The Heat of the Night"	7 March 2025
68	8	"Elbows Out"	7 March 2025
69	9	"Under New Management"	7 March 2025
70	10	"End Game"	7 March 2025

=== Season 8 (2026) ===
No. overall	No. in season	Title	Original release date
71	1	"New Kids On The Track"	27 February 2026
72	2	"Strictly Business"	27 February 2026
73	3	"The Number 1 Problem"	27 February 2026
74	4	"A Bull With No Horns"	27 February 2026
75	5	"The Sky's The Limit"	27 February 2026
76	6	"The Duel"	27 February 2026
77	7	"What Happens In Vegas"	27 February 2026
78	8	"Call Me Chucky"	27 February 2026

== Reception ==
Since its release Drive to Survive has received massive recognition for increasing visibly to its fans. It's widely credited for attracting a new variety of audiences particularly American fans who previously had little exposure to the sport. What used to be seen as a secretive exclusive sport has now become mainstream. Researchers Caroline Soble and Mark Lowes suggest that this transformation happened once show directors stopped focusing on the technical aspect of the sport and instead focused on the storytelling. By focusing on the "natural drama" of the paddock rather than technical data, the series managed to hook a whole new audience for the sport.

However, not everything is received with praise. While the show is seen as a hit it has also received some backlash for being misleading not only to loyal viewers but to the drivers. The main issue being that the production team usually prioritizes drama instead of the actual truth. At times the series would fake commentary, misplace team radios, stage scenes, and overdramatize certain crashes and relationships within the paddock. Red Bull Driver Max Verstappen has sat out of interviews numerous times because throughout the season he felt as if the show was creating fake rivalries for pure entertainment and sensationalism. He expressed how the show wrongly portrays certain drivers as villains to create a rivalry storytelling. Though after a few conversations and meetings Verstappen participated once again in season 5 when he made a personal agreement with producers to "keep it real".

=== Awards and nominations ===
Year	Award	Category	Nominee(s)	Result	Ref.
2019	Cinema Audio Society Awards	Outstanding Achievement in Sound Mixing for Television Non Fiction, Variety or Music – Series or Specials	Nick Fry, Steve Speed, James Evans (for "The Next Generation)	Nominated	
2020	British Academy Television Craft Awards	Best Sound: Factual	Nick Fry, Steve Speed, James Evans, Nick Adams	Nominated	
2020	Royal Television Society Craft & Design Awards	Sound - Entertainment & Non Drama	Steve Speed, Nick Fry, James Evans, Hugh Dwan	Nominated	
2021	Sports Emmy Awards	Outstanding Serialized Sports Documentary	Formula 1: Drive to Survive	Nominated	
2021	British Academy Television Craft Awards	Best Sound: Factual	Nick Fry, Steve Speed, James Evans, Hugh Dwan	Won	
2021	Producers Guild of America Awards	Outstanding Sports Program	Formula 1: Drive to Survive	Nominated	
2021	Golden Reel Awards	Outstanding Achievement in Sound Editing – Non-Theatrical Documentary	Steve Speed, Nick Fry, Hugh Dwan, James Evans (for "Down to the Wire")	Nominated	
2021	Cinema Audio Society Awards	Outstanding Achievement in Sound Mixing for Television Non Fiction, Variety or Music – Series or Specials	Doug Dreger, Nick Fry, Steve Speed (for "Man on Fire")	Nominated	
2021	Royal Television Society Craft & Design Awards	Sound - Entertainment & Non Drama	Steve Speed, Nick Fry, James Evans, Hugh Dwan	Won	
2022	American Cinema Editors Awards	Best Edited Non-Scripted Series	Dan Ablett, Kevin Austin, Otto Burnham, Shane McCormack, Graham Taylor (for "Man on Fire")	Won	
2022	British Academy Television Craft Awards	Best Sound: Factual	Doug Dreger, Andrew Yarme, Nick Fry, Steve Speed, Hugh Dwan, James Evans	Nominated	
2022	Sports Emmy Awards	Outstanding Documentary Series - Serialized	Formula 1: Drive to Survive	Won	
2022	Sports Emmy Awards	Outstanding Editing - Long Form	Formula 1: Drive to Survive	Nominated	
2022	Producers Guild of America Awards	Best Sports Program	Formula 1: Drive to Survive	Nominated	
2023	Cinema Audio Society Awards	Outstanding Achievement in Sound Mixing for Television Non Fiction, Variety or Music – Series or Specials	Nick Fry, Steve Speed (for "Gloves Are Off")	Won	
2023	Golden Reel Awards	Outstanding Achievement in Sound Editing – Non-Theatrical Documentary	Steve Speed, Nick Fry, James Evans, Hugh Dwan (for "Gloves Are Off")	Won	
2023	Sports Emmy Awards	Outstanding Documentary Series - Serialized	Formula 1: Drive to Survive	Nominated	
2023	Sports Emmy Awards	Outstanding Audio/Sound - Post-Produced	Formula 1: Drive to Survive	Nominated	
2024	Cinema Audio Society Awards	Outstanding Achievement in Sound Mixing for Television – Non-Fiction, Variety, or Music/Series or Specials	Doug Dredger, Steve Speed, Nick Fry (for "Over the Limit")	Nominated	
2024	Golden Reel Awards	Outstanding Achievement in Sound Editing – Non-Theatrical Documentary	Steve Speed, Nick Fry, Adam King, Doug Dreger, Ivan Onek, James Spooner (for "Over the Limit")	Nominated	
2024	Producers Guild of America Awards	Outstanding Sports Program	Formula 1: Drive to Survive	Nominated	
2024	Sports Emmy Awards	Outstanding Documentary Series - Serialized	Formula 1: Drive to Survive	Nominated	
2024	Sports Emmy Awards	Outstanding Audio/Sound - Post-Produced	Formula 1: Drive to Survive	Nominated	
2025	Cinema Audio Society Awards	Outstanding Achievement in Sound Mixing for Television – Non-Fiction, Variety, or Music/Series or Specials	Doug Dreger, Steve Speed, Nick Fry (for "Forza Ferrari")	Nominated	
2025	Golden Reel Awards	Outstanding Achievement in Sound Editing – Non-Theatrical Documentary	Nick Fry, Steve Speed, Doug Dreger, Adam King, Tom Maclellan, James Spooner (for "Forza Ferrari")	Nominated	
2025	Golden Trailer Awards	Best Documentary/Reality Poster for a TV/Streaming Series	Netflix / Intermission Film	Won	

== Spin-offs ==
After the massive success Drive to Survive had the sport decided to bring that similar behind the scenes look to its junior categories. In 2020 F1 TV had similarly released a series known as F2: Chasing the Dream that focuses on the 2019 Formula 2 Championship. This gave fans a view of the younger drivers who were competing for a chance to finally move up to the Formula 1 grid. Since its release the show has covered almost every season beginning from 2019 up until today 2026. The sport has also become very accessible to fans all over the world since the recent seasons were released on YouTube to be streamed freely.

== See also ==
- Chasing the Dream
- 100 Days to Indy
