= List of 2026–27 NHL Three Star Awards =

The 2026–27 NHL Three Star Awards are the way the National Hockey League denotes its players of the week and players of the month of the 2026–27 season.

== Weekly ==
Weekly
Week	First Star	Second Star	Third Star	Ref
October 4, 2026	Igor Shesterkin (New York Rangers)	Evan Bouchard (Edmonton Oilers)	Paul Cotter (Vancouver Canucks)	
October 11, 2026	Auston Matthews (Toronto Maple Leafs)	Jake Oettinger (Dallas Stars)	Alexis Lafrenière (New York Rangers)	
October 18, 2026	Brady Tkachuk (Florida Panthers)	Connor McDavid (Edmonton Oilers)	Kirill Kaprizov (Minnesota Wild)	
October 25, 2026	Leon Draisaitl (Edmonton Oilers)	Devin Cooley (Calgary Flames)	Jacob Fowler (Montreal Canadiens)	
November 1, 2026	Tage Thompson (Buffalo Sabres)	Tristan Jarry (Edmonton Oilers)	Leo Carlsson (Anaheim Ducks)	
November 8, 2026	Cutter Gauthier (Anaheim Ducks)	Jack Hughes (New Jersey Devils)	Juuse Saros (Nashville Predators)	
November 15, 2026	Mark Scheifele (Winnipeg Jets)	Jesper Wallstedt (Minnesota Wild)	Nikolaj Ehlers (Carolina Hurricanes)	

== Monthly ==
Monthly
Month	First Star	Second Star	Third Star	Ref
October	Connor McDavid (Edmonton Oilers)	Kirill Kaprizov (Minnesota Wild)	Pyotr Kochetkov (Carolina Hurricanes)	

== Rookie of the Month ==
Rookie of the Month
Month	Player	Ref
October	Jacob Fowler (Montreal Canadiens)	
