= 2026–27 Ottawa Senators season =

Season of play of professional ice hockey team

2026–27 Ottawa Senators
- Division: Atlantic
- Conference: Eastern
- 2026–27 record: 15–6–3
- Home record: 8–2–2
- Road record: 7–4–1
- Goals for: 79
- Goals against: 70

Team information
- General manager: Steve Staios
- Coach: Travis Green
- Captain: Thomas Chabot
- Alternate captains: Claude Giroux; Jake Sanderson; Tim Stützle
- Arena: Canadian Tire Centre
- Minor league affiliates: Belleville Senators (AHL); Allen Americans (ECHL)

Team leaders
- Goals: Tim Stützle (13)
- Assists: Tim Stützle (18)
- Points: Tim Stützle (31)
- Penalty minutes: Nick Cousins (44)
- Plus/minus: Thomas Chabot (+15)
- Wins: Linus Ullmark (11)
- Goals against average: Linus Ullmark (1.47)

The 2026–27 Ottawa Senators season is the 35th season of operation of the Ottawa Senators of the National Hockey League (NHL). The team will attempt to return to the playoffs for a third consecutive season.

== Team business ==
The team reached an agreement with the Professional Women's Hockey League (PWHL), owners of the Ottawa Charge, allowing the team to move to the Canadian Tire Centre (CTC) for the 2026–27 season. This followed the plans of the TD Place Arena's owners to demolish the arena and replace it with a smaller arena. The Charge played their 2026 playoff games at the CTC with near sell-outs.

The team announced that it would host a four-team NHL Prospect Challenge prospects tournament in Gatineau, Quebec, at Centre Slush Puppie arena in September 2026. Other teams participating include Montreal Canadiens, Toronto Maple Leafs, and Winnipeg Jets.

The team announced the renovation of the upper seating area at one end of the Canadian Tire Centre. A new 'Fan Deck' for standing room replaced the upper level seats of the 300-level, reducing the seating capacity of the arena while allowing an open bar area for people to congregate and view the hockey games. The zone is open to all attendees at games, with separate ticketing for selected events.

== Off-season ==
After requesting a trade, team captain Brady Tkachuk was traded on June 21, 2026, to Florida Panthers for three first-round draft picks and a second-round draft pick. Tkachuk was under increased scrutiny after celebrating with the United States national team at the White House and other events. His term with the club ended with a disappointing loss in the 2026 Stanley Cup playoffs, where he failed to register a point. Tkachuk met with general manager Steve Staios and informed him that he would not re-sign with the club after his contract ended, and discussions concluded with his trade request and a list of teams acceptable for trade. Tkachuk joined the Panthers in a similar way to his brother Matthew Tkachuk, who refused to re-sign with the Calgary Flames and was traded.

Continuing in the week before the draft, the Senators traded the ninth-overall pick received for Tkachuk to San Jose Sharks for William Eklund and two prospects. The Senators traded for Andre Burakovsky from the Chicago Blackhawks and goaltender Samuel Ersson from the Toronto Maple Leafs.

== Regular season ==
In October, the Senators announced a multi-year extension for coach Travis Green, to run through the end of 2030-31. In addition, the team gave multi-year extensions to assistants Nolan Baumgartner, Ben Sexton, Mike Yeo and goalie coach Justin Peters.

=== Divisional standings ===
Atlantic Division
Pos	Team	GP	W	L	OTL	RW	GF	GA	GD	Pts
1	Ottawa Senators	24	15	6	3	12	79	70	+9	33
2	Tampa Bay Lightning	22	15	5	2	13	82	62	+20	32
3	Montreal Canadiens	24	14	6	4	9	77	71	+6	32
4	Boston Bruins	23	15	7	1	12	83	61	+22	31
5	Florida Panthers	24	13	8	3	11	76	71	+5	29
6	Buffalo Sabres	23	9	10	4	7	67	81	−14	22
7	Detroit Red Wings	23	8	12	3	6	60	71	−11	19
8	Toronto Maple Leafs	25	8	14	3	7	78	90	−12	19

Updated to game(s) played on November 21, 2026. Source: National Hockey League
Rules for classification: 1) Fewer number of games played (GP, only during regular season); 2) Greater number of regulation wins (RW); 3) Greater number of wins in regulation and overtime, excluding shootout wins (ROW); 4) Greater number of total wins, including shootouts (W); 5) Greater number of points earned in head-to-head play; if teams played an uneven number of head-to-head games, the result of the first game on the home ice of the team with the extra home game is discarded; 6) Greater goal differential (GD); 7) Greater number of goals scored (GF)

=== Conference standings ===
Eastern Conference Wild Card
Pos	Div	Team	GP	W	L	OTL	RW	GF	GA	GD	Pts
1	AT	Boston Bruins	23	15	7	1	12	83	61	+22	31
2	AT	Florida Panthers	24	13	8	3	11	76	71	+5	29
3	ME	New York Islanders	22	11	6	5	9	71	63	+8	27
4	ME	Philadelphia Flyers	26	9	11	6	8	67	88	−21	24
5	AT	Buffalo Sabres	23	9	10	4	7	67	81	−14	22
6	ME	Washington Capitals	21	10	11	0	8	72	83	−11	20
7	AT	Detroit Red Wings	23	8	12	3	6	60	71	−11	19
8	AT	Toronto Maple Leafs	25	8	14	3	7	78	90	−12	19
9	ME	Columbus Blue Jackets	21	9	12	0	4	54	68	−14	18
10	ME	Pittsburgh Penguins	22	7	13	2	3	67	80	−13	16

Updated to game(s) played on November 21, 2026. Source: National Hockey League
Rules for classification: 1) Fewer number of games played (GP, only during regular season); 2) Greater number of regulation wins (RW); 3) Greater number of wins in regulation and overtime, excluding shootout wins (ROW); 4) Greater number of total wins, including shootouts (W); 5) Greater number of points earned in head-to-head play; if teams played an uneven number of head-to-head games, the result of the first game on the home ice of the team with the extra home game is discarded; 6) Greater goal differential (GD); 7) Greater number of goals scored (GF)

== Schedule and results ==
=== Preseason ===
The preseason schedule was published on June 24, 2026.

2026 preseason game log: 1–3–1 (home: 1–1–0; road: 0–2–1)
#	Date	Visitor	Score	Home	OT	Decision	Attendance	Record	Recap
1	September 21^{A}	Ottawa	2–3	Montreal	OT	Ersson	4,500	0–0–1
2	September 23^{B}	Ottawa	1–6	Toronto		Merilainen	17,996	0–1–1
3	September 23^{B}	Toronto	4–2	Ottawa		Ullmark	11,785	0–2–1
4	September 26^{B}	Ottawa	2–4	Montreal		Ersson	20,962	0–3–1
5	September 26^{B}	Montreal	3–4	Ottawa		Ullmark	14,032	1–3–1
Notes:^{A} Game played at Colisée Vidéotron in Trois Rivieres, Quebec.^{B} Split-squad games.

=== Regular season ===
The Ottawa Senators regular season schedule was released on July 16, 2026.

2026–27 game log

October: 9–5–1 (home: 5–2–0; road: 4–3–1)
#	Date	Visitor	Score	Home	OT	Decision	Attendance	Record	Pts	Recap
1	October 3	Ottawa	3–2	Toronto		Ullmark	18,434	1–0–0	2
2	October 5	Ottawa	4–1	Boston		Ullmark	17,850	2–0–0	4
3	October 6	Ottawa	3–5	Detroit		Ersson	17,583	2–1–0	4
4	October 8	Philadelphia	1–2	Ottawa		Ullmark	17,501	3–1–0	6
5	October 10	Nashville	2–3	Ottawa	SO	Ullmark	15,025	4–1–0	8
6	October 12	Ottawa	4–1	New Jersey		Ullmark	15,085	5–1–0	10
7	October 13	St. Louis	7–2	Ottawa		Ersson	14,085	5–2–0	10
8	October 15	NY Islanders	1–2	Ottawa	SO	Ullmark	14,534	6–2–0	12
9	October 17	Ottawa	1–3	Philadelphia		Ullmark	18,953	6–3–0	12
10	October 21	Florida	1–5	Ottawa		Ullmark	17,010	7–3–0	14
11	October 22	San Jose	6–2	Ottawa		Ersson	15,469	7–4–0	14
12	October 24	NY Rangers	4–7	Ottawa		Johansson	15,034	8–4–0	16
13	October 27	Ottawa	1–4	Vegas		Johansson	16,663	8–5–0	16
14	October 29	Ottawa	5–6	Los Angeles	OT	Ersson	15,856	8–5–1	17
15	October 31	Ottawa	5–1	San Jose		Ersson	16,138	9–5–1	19

November: 6–1–2 (home: 3–0–2; road: 3–1–0)
#	Date	Visitor	Score	Home	OT	Decision	Attendance	Record	Pts	Recap
16	November 1	Ottawa	3–6	Anaheim		Johansson	17,174	9–6–1	19
17	November 4	Ottawa	2–1	Buffalo		Ersson	19,070	10–6–1	21
18	November 7	Utah	2–4	Ottawa		Ersson	17,054	11–6–1	23
19	November 10	Washington	3–2	Ottawa	OT	Ersson	16,679	11–6–2	24
20	November 12	Colorado	3–4	Ottawa	OT	Ullmark	16,289	12–6–2	26
21	November 14	Ottawa	4–1	Pittsburgh		Ullmark	18,363	13–6–2	28
22	November 17	Ottawa	2–1	Winnipeg		Ullmark	13,516	14–6–2	30
23	November 19	Philadelphia	6–5	Ottawa	OT	Ersson	15,701	14–6–3	31
24	November 21	Los Angeles	2–4	Ottawa		Ullmark	16,025	15–6–3	33
25	November 23	Calgary	–	Ottawa				0–0–0
26	November 25	Ottawa	–	Florida				0–0–0
27	November 27	Ottawa	–	Tampa Bay				0–0–0
28	November 28	Ottawa	–	Carolina				0–0–0
29	November 30	Ottawa	–	Nashville				0–0–0

December: 0–0–0 (home: 0–0–0; road: 0–0–0)
#	Date	Visitor	Score	Home	OT	Decision	Attendance	Record	Pts	Recap
30	December 3	New Jersey	–	Ottawa				0–0–0
31	December 5	Tampa Bay	–	Ottawa				0–0–0
32	December 6	Ottawa	–	Montreal				0–0–0
33	December 8	Anaheim	–	Ottawa				0–0–0
34	December 10	Vegas	–	Ottawa				0–0–0
35	December 12	Edmonton	–	Ottawa				0–0–0
36	December 14	Buffalo	–	Ottawa				0–0–0
37^{A}	December 18	Chicago	–	Ottawa				0–0–0
38^{A}	December 20	Ottawa	–	Chicago				0–0–0
39	December 27	Ottawa	–	NY Islanders				0–0–0
40	December 29	Dallas	–	Ottawa				0–0–0
41	December 31	Pittsburgh	–	Ottawa				0–0–0

January: 0–0–0 (home: 0–0–0; road: 0–0–0)
#	Date	Visitor	Score	Home	OT	Decision	Attendance	Record	Pts	Recap
42	January 2	Ottawa	–	Washington				0–0–0
43	January 5	Ottawa	–	Utah				0–0–0
44	January 6	Ottawa	–	Colorado				0–0–0
45	January 8	Ottawa	–	St. Louis				0–0–0
46	January 12	Ottawa	–	Dallas				0–0–0
47	January 14	Winnipeg	–	Ottawa				0–0–0
48	January 16	Ottawa	–	Tampa Bay				0–0–0
49	January 18	Ottawa	–	Florida				0–0–0
50	January 20	Toronto	–	Ottawa				0–0–0
51	January 23	Columbus	–	Ottawa				0–0–0
52	January 25	Carolina	–	Ottawa				0–0–0
53	January 28	Boston	–	Ottawa				0–0–0
54	January 30	NY Rangers	–	Ottawa				0–0–0

February: 0–0–0 (home: 0–0–0; road: 0–0–0)
#	Date	Visitor	Score	Home	OT	Decision	Attendance	Record	Pts	Recap
55	February 9	Columbus	–	Ottawa				0–0–0
56	February 11	Ottawa	–	Columbus				0–0–0
57	February 13	Toronto	–	Ottawa				0–0–0
58	February 15	Ottawa	–	Minnesota				0–0–0
59	February 17	Ottawa	–	Seattle				0–0–0
60	February 18	Ottawa	–	Vancouver				0–0–0
61	February 21	Ottawa	–	Calgary				0–0–0
62	February 22	Ottawa	–	Edmonton				0–0–0
63	February 25	Detroit	–	Ottawa				0–0–0
64	February 26	Ottawa	–	Buffalo				0–0–0

March: 0–0–0 (home: 0–0–0; road: 0–0–0)
#	Date	Visitor	Score	Home	OT	Decision	Attendance	Record	Pts	Recap
65	March 2	Ottawa	–	New Jersey				0–0–0
66	March 4	Boston	–	Ottawa				0–0–0
67	March 6	Seattle	–	Ottawa				0–0–0
68	March 7	Buffalo	–	Ottawa				0–0–0
69	March 9	Ottawa	–	Pittsburgh				0–0–0
70	March 11	Minnesota	–	Ottawa				0–0–0
71	March 13	Montreal	–	Ottawa				0–0–0
72	March 14	Vancouver	–	Ottawa				0–0–0
73	March 16	Ottawa	–	NY Rangers				0–0–0
74	March 18	Florida	–	Ottawa				0–0–0
75	March 20	Tampa Bay	–	Ottawa				0–0–0
76	March 24	Ottawa	–	Montreal				0–0–0
77	March 25	Ottawa	–	Boston				0–0–0
78	March 27	Ottawa	–	Toronto				0–0–0
79	March 30	Ottawa	–	Detroit				0–0–0

April: 0–0–0 (home: 0–0–0; road: 0–0–0)
#	Date	Visitor	Score	Home	OT	Decision	Attendance	Record	Pts	Recap
80	April 2	Ottawa	–	NY Islanders				0–0–0
81	April 4	Detroit	–	Ottawa				0–0–0
82	April 7	Ottawa	–	Carolina				0–0–0
83	April 8	Washington	–	Ottawa				0–0–0
84	April 10	Montreal	–	Ottawa				0–0–0

Legend: Win (2 points) Loss (0 points) Overtime/shootout loss (1 point)
Notes:
^{A} Game played at PSD Bank Dome in Düsseldorf, Germany

== Players statistics ==
As of October 31st, 2026

=== Skaters ===
Regular season
Player	GP	G	A	Pts	+/−	PIM
Tim Stützle	15	9	12	21	+6	2
Drake Batherson	15	9	8	17	+4	10
Shane Pinto	15	5	6	11	-1	8
Dylan Cozens	15	4	6	10	+1	8
Claude Giroux	15	2	6	8	+5	2
Jake Sanderson	7	1	7	8	0	2
Michael Amadio	15	3	3	6	-2	8
Fabian Zetterlund	15	1	5	6	+2	0
Stephen Halliday	15	3	2	5	-7	0
Thomas Chabot	11	1	4	5	+5	12
Ridly Greig	13	2	2	4	+4	13
Warren Foegele	13	1	3	4	+5	4
Tyler Kleven	15	2	1	3	+4	8
Carter Yakemchuk	13	1	2	3	-6	6
Jordan Spence	15	1	2	3	+2	4
Nikolas Matinpalo	13	0	3	3	+4	8
Artem Zub	8	0	3	3	+8	12
William Eklund	4	1	1	2	+1	2
Nick Cousins	15	1	1	2	-4	42
Philip Tomasino	1	0	1	1	+1	0
André Burakovsky	8	0	0	0	-2	2
Hayden Hodgson	5	0	0	0	-1	24
Hoyt Stanley	4	0	0	0	-1	4
Cameron Crotty^{‡}	3	0	0	0	+1	0
Xavier Bourgault	1	0	0	0	-1	0

=== Goaltenders ===
Regular season
Player	GP	GS	TOI	W	L	OT	GA	GAA	SA	SV%	SO	G	A	PIM
Linus Ullmark	8	8	450:04	7	1	0	10	1.33	182	.945	0	0	0	0
Jonas Johansson	3	3	148:35	1	1	0	10	4.04	71	.859	0	0	1	0
Samuel Ersson	7	4	301:24	1	3	1	19	3.78	142	.866	0	0	0	0

^{†}Denotes player spent time with another team before joining the Senators. Stats reflect time with the Senators only.
^{‡}No longer with the Senators.

== Awards and honours ==
=== Milestones ===
Regular season
Tyler Boucher	1st career NHL game 1st career NHL goal 1st career NHL point	November 17, 2026

== Roster ==
Updated November 21, 2026

No.	Nat	Player	Pos	S/G	Age	Acquired	Birthplace
22	(Canada)	Michael Amadio	RW	R	30	2024	Sault Ste. Marie, Ontario
19	(Canada)	Drake Batherson	RW	R	28	2017	Fort Wayne, Indiana
79	(Canada)	Sammy Blais	LW	L	30	2026	Montmagny, Quebec
95	(Sweden)	André Burakovsky	LW	L	31	2026	Klagenfurt, Austria
72	(Canada)	Thomas Chabot (C)	D	L	29	2015	Sainte-Marie, Quebec
21	(Canada)	Nick Cousins	C	L	33	2024	Belleville, Ontario
24	(Canada)	Dylan Cozens	C	R	25	2025	Whitehorse, Yukon
27	(Sweden)	William Eklund	LW	L	24	2026	Haninge, Sweden
30	(Sweden)	Samuel Ersson	G	L	27	2026	Falun, Sweden
37	(Canada)	Warren Foegele	LW	L	30	2026	Markham, Ontario
28	(Canada)	Claude Giroux (A)	RW	R	38	2022	Hearst, Ontario
71	(Canada)	Ridly Greig	C	L	24	2020	Calgary, Alberta
34	(Canada)	Stephen Halliday	C	L	24	2022	Ajax, Ontario
42	(Canada)	Hayden Hodgson	RW	R	30	2024	Windsor, Ontario
43	(United States)	Tyler Kleven	D	L	24	2020	Fargo, North Dakota
33	(Finland)	Nikolas Matinpalo	D	R	28	2023	Espoo, Finland
12	(United States)	Shane Pinto	C	R	26	2019	Franklin Square, New York
85	(United States)	Jake Sanderson (A)	D	L	24	2020	Whitefish, Montana
10	(Canada)	Jordan Spence	D	R	25	2025	Sydney, Australia
18	(Germany)	Tim Stützle (A)	C	L	24	2020	Viersen, Germany
62	(Canada)	Philip Tomasino	F	R	25	2026	Mississauga, Ontario
35	(Sweden)	Linus Ullmark	G	L	33	2024	Lugnvik, Sweden
26	(Canada)	Carter Yakemchuk	D	R	21	2024	Fort McMurray, Alberta
20	(Sweden)	Fabian Zetterlund	LW	R	27	2025	Karlstad, Sweden
2	(Russia)	Artem Zub	D	R	31	2020	Khabarovsk, Russia

== Transactions ==
The Senators have been involved in the following transactions during the 2026–27 season.

=== Key ===
† Contract is entry-level.
‡ Contract takes effect in the 2027–28 season.

=== Trades ===
Date	Details		Ref
September 25, 2026	To Tampa Bay Lightning Future considerations	To Ottawa Senators Jonas Johansson	

=== Players acquired ===
Date	Player	Former team	Term	Via	Ref
July 1, 2026	Sammy Blais	Montreal Canadiens	2-year	Free agency	NHL
July 1, 2026	Christian Kyrou	Dallas Stars	1-year	Free agency	NHL
July 1, 2026	Ryan Suzuki	Carolina Hurricanes	1-year	Free agency	NHL
July 1, 2026	Philip Tomasino	Philadelphia Flyers	1-year	Free agency	NHL

=== Players lost ===
Date	Player	New team	Term	Via	Ref
July 1, 2026	Lars Eller	Florida Panthers	1-year	Free agency	NHL
July 1, 2026	Dennis Gilbert	Buffalo Sabres	1-year	Free agency	NHL
July 1, 2026	Nick Jensen	Anaheim Ducks	2-year	Free agency	NHL
July 1, 2026	Garrett Pilon	Barys Astana (KHL)	1-year	Free agency	EP
July 1, 2026	Mads Sogaard	Tampa Bay Lightning	1-year	Free agency	NHL
July 19, 2026	Jamieson Rees	Straubing Tigers (DEL)	1-year	Free agency	EP
September 7, 2026	Graeme Clarke	Frölunda HC (SHL)	1-year	Free agency	EP
September 25, 2026	Leevi Merilainen	Vancouver Canucks		Waivers	
October 29, 2026	Cameron Crotty	Minnesota Wild		Waivers	

=== Signings ===
Date	Player	Term	Ref
July 1, 2026	Nick Cousins	2-year	TSN
July 1, 2026	Samuel Ersson	2-year	The Hockey News
July 1, 2026	Philippe Daoust	1-year	NHL
July 2, 2026	Leevi Merilainen	1-year	NHL
July 7, 2026	Claude Giroux	1-year	NHL
July 9, 2026	Xavier Bourgault	1-year	NHL
July 10, 2026	Tyler Boucher	1-year	NHL
September 15, 2026	Drake Batherson	8-year‡	TSN

== Draft picks ==
The 2026 NHL entry draft was held on June 26 and 27 at KeyBank Center in Buffalo, New York. Ottawa made the following selections:

Round	Overall	Player	Position	Nationality	Club team
1	25 (Note: (from Tampa Bay via Seattle and Florida))	Jonas Lagerberg Hoen	RW	Sweden	Leksands IF (SHL)
1	32	Jaxon Cover	LW	Canada	London Knights (OHL)
3	72 (Note: (from Florida))	Adam Nemec	LW	Slovakia	Sudbury Wolves (OHL)
3	87	Oscar Holmertz	C	Sweden	Linkoping HC (SHL-Jr)
3	91 (Note: (from Dallas via Carolina and Los Angeles))	Louis Felix Bourque	RW	Canada	Drummondville Voltigeurs (QMJHL)
4	110 (Note: (from Columbus via Detroit))	Elliot Lennon	G	Canada	Deerfield (Massachusetts HS)
5	151	Harris Pangretitsch	D	Canada	Sault Ste Marie Greyhounds (OHL)
6	183	Alexander Grunin	D	Russia	Sibirskie Snaipery Novosibirsk (MHL Russia Jr)

Source: NHL
