= 2026–27 Edmonton Oilers season =

National Hockey League season

2026–27 Edmonton Oilers
- Division: Pacific
- Conference: Western
- 2026–27 record: 17–5–3
- Home record: 7–3–2
- Road record: 10–2–1
- Goals for: 97
- Goals against: 72

Team information
- General manager: Stan Bowman
- Coach: Mike Babcock
- Captain: Connor McDavid
- Alternate captains: Evan Bouchard; Leon Draisaitl; Zach Hyman; Ryan Nugent-Hopkins
- Arena: Rogers Place
- Minor league affiliates: Bakersfield Condors (AHL); Fort Wayne Komets (ECHL)

Team leaders
- Goals: Leon Draisaitl (22)
- Assists: Connor McDavid (44)
- Points: Connor McDavid (57)
- Penalty minutes: Connor Murphy (35)
- Plus/minus: Evan Bouchard (+28)
- Wins: Devon Levi (10)
- Goals against average: Tristan Jarry (2.45)

The 2026–27 Edmonton Oilers season is the 48th season for the National Hockey League (NHL) franchise that was established on June 22, 1979, and 55th season for the organization overall, including their play in the World Hockey Association (WHA).

== Standings ==
=== Divisional standings ===
Pacific Division
| Pos | Team | GP | W | L | OTL | RW | GF | GA | GD | Pts |
|---|---|---|---|---|---|---|---|---|---|---|
| 1 | Edmonton Oilers | 24 | 17 | 4 | 3 | 14 | 93 | 65 | +28 | 37 |
| 2 | Vegas Golden Knights | 24 | 13 | 6 | 5 | 11 | 80 | 71 | +9 | 31 |
| 3 | Anaheim Ducks | 23 | 11 | 11 | 1 | 10 | 85 | 89 | −4 | 23 |
| 4 | San Jose Sharks | 24 | 10 | 12 | 2 | 3 | 65 | 86 | −21 | 22 |
| 5 | Seattle Kraken | 19 | 10 | 8 | 1 | 7 | 64 | 67 | −3 | 21 |
| 6 | Calgary Flames | 23 | 10 | 12 | 1 | 9 | 57 | 80 | −23 | 21 |
| 7 | Los Angeles Kings | 20 | 7 | 11 | 2 | 4 | 56 | 66 | −10 | 16 |
| 8 | Vancouver Canucks | 24 | 5 | 18 | 1 | 3 | 67 | 105 | −38 | 11 |

Updated to game(s) played on November 19, 2026. Source: National Hockey League
Rules for classification: 1) Fewer number of games played (GP, only during regular season); 2) Greater number of regulation wins (RW); 3) Greater number of wins in regulation and overtime, excluding shootout wins (ROW); 4) Greater number of total wins, including shootouts (W); 5) Greater number of points earned in head-to-head play; if teams played an uneven number of head-to-head games, the result of the first game on the home ice of the team with the extra home game is discarded; 6) Greater goal differential (GD); 7) Greater number of goals scored (GF)

=== Conference standings ===
Western Conference Wild Card
| Pos | Div | Team | GP | W | L | OTL | RW | GF | GA | GD | Pts |
|---|---|---|---|---|---|---|---|---|---|---|---|
| 1 | CE | Nashville Predators | 22 | 11 | 6 | 5 | 8 | 67 | 66 | +1 | 27 |
| 2 | CE | Utah Mammoth | 23 | 11 | 9 | 3 | 9 | 77 | 79 | −2 | 25 |
| 3 | CE | Winnipeg Jets | 23 | 11 | 9 | 3 | 8 | 71 | 77 | −6 | 25 |
| 4 | CE | St. Louis Blues | 22 | 11 | 9 | 2 | 10 | 68 | 67 | +1 | 24 |
| 5 | PA | San Jose Sharks | 24 | 10 | 12 | 2 | 3 | 65 | 86 | −21 | 22 |
| 6 | PA | Seattle Kraken | 19 | 10 | 8 | 1 | 7 | 64 | 67 | −3 | 21 |
| 7 | PA | Calgary Flames | 23 | 10 | 12 | 1 | 9 | 57 | 80 | −23 | 21 |
| 8 | PA | Los Angeles Kings | 20 | 7 | 11 | 2 | 4 | 56 | 66 | −10 | 16 |
| 9 | CE | Chicago Blackhawks | 22 | 6 | 14 | 2 | 4 | 54 | 90 | −36 | 14 |
| 10 | PA | Vancouver Canucks | 24 | 5 | 18 | 1 | 3 | 67 | 105 | −38 | 11 |

Updated to game(s) played on November 19, 2026. Source: National Hockey League
Rules for classification: 1) Fewer number of games played (GP, only during regular season); 2) Greater number of regulation wins (RW); 3) Greater number of wins in regulation and overtime, excluding shootout wins (ROW); 4) Greater number of total wins, including shootouts (W); 5) Greater number of points earned in head-to-head play; if teams played an uneven number of head-to-head games, the result of the first game on the home ice of the team with the extra home game is discarded; 6) Greater goal differential (GD); 7) Greater number of goals scored (GF)

== Schedule and results ==
=== Preseason ===
The preseason schedule was published on June 17, 2026.

2026 preseason game log: 4–0–0 (Home: 2–0–0; Road: 2–0–0)
| # | Date | Visitor | Score | Home | OT | Decision | Attendance | Record | Recap |
|---|---|---|---|---|---|---|---|---|---|
| 1 | September 19 | Winnipeg | 2–5 | Edmonton | | Jarry | 15,730 | 1–0–0 |
| 2 | September 22 | Edmonton | 2–1 | Winnipeg | OT | Ungar | 14,144 | 2–0–0 |
| 3 | September 24 | Edmonton | 2–1 | Vancouver | | Jarry | 15,880 | 3–0–0 |
| 4 | September 26 | Calgary | 1–4 | Edmonton | | Levi | 16,551 | 4–0–0 |

=== Regular season ===
The Edmonton Oilers regular season schedule was released on July 16, 2026.

2026–27 game log

September: 0–0–1 (Home: 0–0–1; Road: 0–0–0)
| # | Date | Visitor | Score | Home | OT | Decision | Attendance | Record | Points | Recap |
|---|---|---|---|---|---|---|---|---|---|---|
| 1 | September 29 | Vancouver | 6–5 | Edmonton | OT | Jarry | 18,347 | 0–0–1 | 1 |

October: 10–2–1 (Home: 4–2–1; Road: 6–0–0)
| # | Date | Visitor | Score | Home | OT | Decision | Attendance | Record | Points | Recap |
|---|---|---|---|---|---|---|---|---|---|---|
| 2 | October 1 | Edmonton | 9–7 | Vancouver | | Levi | 18,677 | 1–0–1 | 3 |
| 3 | October 3 | Seattle | 1–3 | Edmonton | | Levi | 18,070 | 2–0–1 | 5 |
| 4 | October 7 | Edmonton | 5–2 | Anaheim | | Levi | 17,174 | 3–0–1 | 7 |
| 5 | October 10 | Edmonton | 3–1 | San Jose | | Jarry | 17,435 | 4–0–1 | 9 |
| 6 | October 13 | Edmonton | 4–1 | Los Angeles | | Levi | 16,192 | 5–0–1 | 11 |
| 7 | October 15 | Utah | 4–2 | Edmonton | | Levi | 16,176 | 5–1–1 | 11 |
| 8 | October 17 | Edmonton | 6–2 | Utah | | Jarry | 14,111 | 6–1–1 | 13 |
| 9 | October 20 | Minnesota | 3–4 | Edmonton | OT | Levi | 17,032 | 7–1–1 | 15 |
| 10 | October 22 | Carolina | 5–6 | Edmonton | SO | Levi | 16,420 | 8–1–1 | 17 |
| 11 | October 24 | Toronto | 7–2 | Edmonton | | Jarry | 18,347 | 8–2–1 | 17 |
| 12 | October 26 | Detroit | 4–3 | Edmonton | SO | Jarry | 17,043 | 8–2–2 | 18 |
| 13 | October 28 | Calgary | 0–4 | Edmonton | | Jarry | 17,032 | 9–2–2 | 20 |
| 14 | October 31 | Edmonton | 4–0 | NY Islanders | | Jarry | 16,587 | 10–2–2 | 22 |

November: 7–3–1 (Home: 3–1–0; Road: 4–2–1)
| # | Date | Visitor | Score | Home | OT | Decision | Attendance | Record | Points | Recap |
|---|---|---|---|---|---|---|---|---|---|---|
| 15 | November 1 | Edmonton | 4–1 | NY Rangers | | Tomkins | 18,006 | 11–2–2 | 24 |
| 16 | November 3 | Edmonton | 3–4 | New Jersey | SO | Jarry | 16,514 | 11–2–3 | 25 |
| 17 | November 5 | Anaheim | 5–4 | Edmonton | | Tomkins | 16,587 | 11–3–3 | 25 |
| 18 | November 7 | Vancouver | 2–4 | Edmonton | | Levi | 17,555 | 12–3–3 | 27 |
| 19 | November 9 | NY Rangers | 1–3 | Edmonton | | Levi | 17,047 | 13–3–3 | 29 |
| 20 | November 11 | Philadelphia | 2–3 | Edmonton | OT | Jarry | 18,347 | 14–3–3 | 31 |
| 21 | November 14 | Edmonton | 1–0 | Toronto | | Levi | 19,002 | 15–3–3 | 33 |
| 22 | November 15 | Edmonton | 5–2 | Philadelphia | | Jarry | 18,903 | 16–3–3 | 35 |
| 23 | November 17 | Edmonton | 5–2 | Florida | | Levi | 18,432 | 17–3–3 | 37 |
| 24 | November 19 | Edmonton | 1–3 | Tampa Bay | | Levi | 19,092 | 17–4–3 | 37 |
| 25 | November 21 | Edmonton | 4–7 | Carolina | | Levi | 18,855 | 17–5–3 | 37 |
| 26 | November 22 | Edmonton | – | St. Louis |
| 27 | November 24 | Vegas | – | Edmonton |
| 28 | November 27 | Seattle | – | Edmonton |
| 29 | November 28 | Edmonton | – | Seattle |

December: 0–0–0 (Home: 0–0–0; Road: 0–0–0)
| # | Date | Visitor | Score | Home | OT | Decision | Attendance | Record | Points | Recap |
|---|---|---|---|---|---|---|---|---|---|---|
| 30 | December 1 | Buffalo | – | Edmonton |
| 31 | December 3 | Washington | – | Edmonton |
| 32 | December 6 | Edmonton | – | Chicago |
| 33 | December 8 | Edmonton | – | Minnesota |
| 34 | December 10 | Edmonton | – | Buffalo |
| 35 | December 12 | Edmonton | – | Ottawa |
| 36 | December 14 | Edmonton | – | Montreal |
| 37 | December 17 | Dallas | – | Edmonton |
| 38 | December 19 | Utah | – | Edmonton |
| 39 | December 20 | Anaheim | – | Edmonton |
| 40 | December 27 | Edmonton | – | Columbus |
| 41 | December 28 | Edmonton | – | Washington |
| 42 | December 30 | Edmonton | – | Boston |

January: 0–0–0 (Home: 0–0–0; Road: 0–0–0)
| # | Date | Visitor | Score | Home | OT | Decision | Attendance | Record | Points | Recap |
|---|---|---|---|---|---|---|---|---|---|---|
| 43 | January 2 | Edmonton | – | Detroit |
| 44 | January 3 | Edmonton | – | Pittsburgh |
| 45 | January 5 | Edmonton | – | Nashville |
| 46 | January 7 | Florida | – | Edmonton |
| 47 | January 9 | NY Islanders | – | Edmonton |
| 48 | January 11 | Tampa Bay | – | Edmonton |
| 49 | January 13 | San Jose | – | Edmonton |
| 50 | January 15 | Columbus | – | Edmonton |
| 51 | January 17 | Winnipeg | – | Edmonton |
| 52 | January 20 | Edmonton | – | Vegas |
| 53 | January 21 | Edmonton | – | Los Angeles |
| 54 | January 23 | Edmonton | – | San Jose |
| 55 | January 26 | Edmonton | – | Colorado |
| 56 | January 28 | New Jersey | – | Edmonton |
| 57 | January 30 | Montreal | – | Edmonton |

February: 0–0–0 (Home: 0–0–0; Road: 0–0–0)
| # | Date | Visitor | Score | Home | OT | Decision | Attendance | Record | Points | Recap |
|---|---|---|---|---|---|---|---|---|---|---|
| 58 | February 3 | Vegas | – | Edmonton |
| 59 | February 12 | St. Louis | – | Edmonton |
| 60 | February 13 | Pittsburgh | – | Edmonton |
| 61 | February 17 | Colorado | – | Edmonton |
| 62 | February 19 | Boston | – | Edmonton |
| 63 | February 22 | Ottawa | – | Edmonton |
| 64 | February 25 | Edmonton | – | Nashville |
| 65 | February 27 | Edmonton | – | Dallas |

March: 0–0–0 (Home: 0–0–0; Road: 0–0–0)
| # | Date | Visitor | Score | Home | OT | Decision | Attendance | Record | Points | Recap |
|---|---|---|---|---|---|---|---|---|---|---|
| 66 | March 1 | Edmonton | – | Chicago |
| 67 | March 3 | Edmonton | – | Calgary |
| 68 | March 6 | Chicago | – | Edmonton |
| 69 | March 9 | Los Angeles | – | Edmonton |
| 70 | March 11 | Nashville | – | Edmonton |
| 71 | March 13 | Edmonton | – | Seattle |
| 72 | March 15 | Edmonton | – | Colorado |
| 73 | March 18 | St. Louis | – | Edmonton |
| 74 | March 20 | Dallas | – | Edmonton |
| 75 | March 21 | Edmonton | – | Vancouver |
| 76 | March 23 | Edmonton | – | Calgary |
| 77 | March 25 | Edmonton | – | Minnesota |
| 78 | March 27 | Los Angeles | – | Edmonton |
| 79 | March 31 | San Jose | – | Edmonton |

April: 0–0–0 (Home: 0–0–0; Road: 0–0–0)
| # | Date | Visitor | Score | Home | OT | Decision | Attendance | Record | Points | Recap |
|---|---|---|---|---|---|---|---|---|---|---|
| 80 | April 2 | Edmonton | – | Vegas |
| 81 | April 3 | Edmonton | – | Anaheim |
| 82 | April 5 | Calgary | – | Edmonton |
| 83 | April 7 | Edmonton | – | Winnipeg |
| 84 | April 10 | Winnipeg | – | Edmonton |

Legend: Win (2 points) Loss (0 points) Overtime/shootout loss (1 point)

== Roster ==
Updated November 16, 2026

| No. | Nat | Player | Pos | S/G | Age | Acquired | Birthplace |
|---|---|---|---|---|---|---|---|
| 30 | (Denmark) | Frederik Andersen | G | L | 37 | 2026 | Herning, Denmark |
| 2 | (Canada) | Evan Bouchard (A) | D | R | 27 | 2018 | Oakville, Ontario |
| 34 | (Canada) | Colton Dach | C | L | 23 | 2026 | Fort Saskatchewan, Alberta |
| 16 | (Canada) | Jason Dickinson | C | L | 31 | 2026 | Georgetown, Ontario |
| 29 | (Germany) | Leon Draisaitl (A) | C | L | 31 | 2014 | Cologne, Germany |
| 14 | (Sweden) | Mattias Ekholm | D | L | 36 | 2023 | Borlange, Sweden |
| 49 | (United States) | Ty Emberson | D | R | 26 | 2024 | Eau Claire, Wisconsin |
| 26 | (Canada) | Alex Formenton | LW | L | 27 | 2026 | Barrie, Ontario |
| 10 | (United States) | Trent Frederic | C | L | 28 | 2025 | St. Louis, Missouri |
| 19 | (Sweden) | Filip Hållander | C | L | 26 | 2026 | Sundsvall, Sweden |
| 18 | (Canada) | Zach Hyman (A) | LW | R | 34 | 2021 | Toronto, Ontario |
| 13 | (Sweden) | Mattias Janmark | C | L | 33 | 2022 | Danderyd, Sweden |
| 35 | (Canada) | Tristan Jarry | G | L | 31 | 2025 | Surrey, British Columbia |
| 46 | (United States) | Max Jones | LW | L | 28 | 2025 | Rochester, Michigan |
| 21 | (Canada) | Mathieu Joseph | RW | L | 29 | 2026 | Laval, Quebec |
| 42 | (Finland) | Kasperi Kapanen | RW | R | 30 | 2024 | Kuopio, Finland |
| 27 | (Canada) | Devon Levi | G | L | 24 | 2026 | Dollard-des-Ormeaux, Quebec |
| 43 | (United States) | Owen Michaels | RW | R | 24 | 2026 | Northville, Michigan |
| 97 | (Canada) | Connor McDavid (C) | C | L | 29 | 2015 | Richmond Hill, Ontario |
| 85 | (Russia) | Shakir Mukhamadullin | D | L | 24 | 2026 | Ufa, Russia |
| 5 | (United States) | Connor Murphy | D | R | 33 | 2026 | Boston, Massachusetts |
| 93 | (Canada) | Ryan Nugent-Hopkins (A) | C | L | 33 | 2011 | Burnaby, British Columbia |
| 92 | (Russia) | Vasily Podkolzin | RW | L | 25 | 2024 | Moscow, Russia |
| 75 | (United States) | Alec Regula | D | R | 26 | 2024 | West Bloomfield, Michigan |
| 22 | (Canada) | Matt Savoie | C | R | 22 | 2024 | St. Albert, Alberta |
| 6 | (United States) | Ryan Shea | D | L | 29 | 2026 | Milton, Massachusetts |
| 96 | (Canada) | Jake Walman | D | L | 30 | 2025 | Toronto, Ontario |

== Player statistics ==
=== Skaters ===
Regular season
| Player | GP | G | A | Pts | +/− | PIM |
|---|---|---|---|---|---|---|
| Connor McDavid | 25 | 13 | 44 | 57 | +26 | 8 |
| Leon Draisaitl | 25 | 22 | 24 | 46 | +23 | 8 |
| Evan Bouchard | 25 | 12 | 26 | 38 | +28 | 6 |
| Vasily Podkolzin | 25 | 13 | 8 | 21 | +15 | 33 |
| Kasperi Kapanen | 25 | 6 | 7 | 13 | −4 | 15 |
| Ryan Nugent-Hopkins | 12 | 4 | 7 | 11 | −1 | 8 |
| Mattias Ekholm | 23 | 3 | 8 | 11 | +25 | 28 |
| Mathieu Joseph | 25 | 4 | 5 | 9 | −4 | 6 |
| Ryan Shea | 25 | 1 | 6 | 7 | −2 | 6 |
| Zach Hyman | 14 | 4 | 2 | 6 | −2 | 4 |
| Colton Dach | 19 | 4 | 2 | 6 | −2 | 17 |
| Owen Michaels | 25 | 3 | 2 | 5 | −6 | 6 |
| Jason Dickinson | 16 | 2 | 3 | 5 | 0 | 0 |
| Alex Formenton | 25 | 2 | 3 | 5 | +3 | 4 |
| Isaac Howard | 13 | 1 | 2 | 3 | 0 | 2 |
| Shakir Mukhamadullin | 20 | 1 | 1 | 2 | −4 | 6 |
| Ty Emberson | 21 | 0 | 2 | 2 | +1 | 11 |
| Trent Frederic | 22 | 1 | 0 | 1 | +1 | 24 |
| Connor Murphy | 25 | 0 | 1 | 1 | −6 | 35 |
| Jake Walman | 11 | 0 | 1 | 1 | −8 | 6 |
| Josh Samanski | 6 | 0 | 1 | 1 | +1 | 8 |
| Max Jones | 10 | 0 | 0 | 0 | −4 | 10 |
| Filip Hållander^{†} | 13 | 0 | 0 | 0 | −3 | 8 |

=== Goaltenders ===
Regular season
| Player | GP | GS | TOI | W | L | OT | GA | GAA | SA | SV% | SO | G | A | PIM |
|---|---|---|---|---|---|---|---|---|---|---|---|---|---|---|
| Devon Levi | 13 | 13 | 783:07 | 10 | 3 | 0 | 37 | 2.83 | 345 | .896 | 1 | 0 | 1 | 0 |
| Tristan Jarry | 10 | 10 | 611:52 | 6 | 1 | 3 | 25 | 2.45 | 274 | .912 | 2 | 0 | 0 | 2 |
| Matt Tomkins | 2 | 2 | 116:27 | 1 | 1 | 0 | 6 | 3.10 | 50 | .880 | 0 | 0 | 0 | 0 |

^{†}Denotes player spent time with another team before joining the Oilers. Stats reflect time with the Oilers only.
^{‡}Denotes player was traded mid-season. Stats reflect time with the Oilers only.

== Awards and honours ==
=== Awards ===
| Player | Award | Awarded | Ref. |
|---|---|---|---|
| Evan Bouchard | NHL 2nd Star of the Week (Sept. 29 – Oct. 4) | October 5, 2026 | |
| Connor McDavid | NHL 2nd Star of the Week (Oct. 12 – Oct. 18) | October 19, 2026 | |
| Leon Draisaitl | NHL 1st Star of the Week (Oct. 19 – Oct. 25) | October 26, 2026 | |
| Connor McDavid | NHL 1st Star of the Month (October) | November 1, 2026 | |
| Tristan Jarry | NHL 2nd Star of the Week (Oct. 26 – Nov. 1) | November 2, 2026 | |

=== Milestones ===
Regular season
| Player | Milestone | Reached |
|---|---|---|
| Owen Michaels | 1st NHL game | September 29, 2026 |
| Evan Bouchard | 2nd NHL hat-trick | September 29, 2026 |
| Owen Michaels | 1st NHL goal 1st NHL point | October 1, 2026 |
| Mathieu Joseph | 100th NHL assist | October 1, 2026 |
| Vasily Podkolzin | 100th NHL point | October 1, 2026 |
| Kasperi Kapanen | 100th NHL goal | October 7, 2026 |
| Connor McDavid | 800th NHL game | October 13, 2026 |
| Owen Michaels | 1st NHL assist | October 15, 2026 |
| Tristan Jarry | 24th NHL shutout | October 28, 2026 |
| Tristan Jarry | 25th NHL shutout | October 31, 2026 |
| Ryan Nugent-Hopkins | 1,038th NHL game | November 3, 2026 |
| Colton Dach | 100th NHL game | November 11, 2026 |
| Devon Levi | 1st NHL shutout | November 14, 2026 |
| Shakir Mukhamadullin | 100th NHL game | November 15, 2026 |
| Zach Hyman | 500th NHL point | November 15, 2026 |
| Jason Dickinson | 100th NHL assist | November 17, 2026 |
| Devon Levi | 1st NHL assist 1st NHL point | November 21, 2026 |

== Transactions ==
The Oilers have been involved in the following transactions during the 2026–27 season.

Key:

† Contract is entry-level.
‡ Contract initially takes effect in the 2027–28 season.

=== Trades ===
| Date | Details | | Ref |
|---|---|---|---|
| July 1, 2026 | To Buffalo Sabres 3rd-round pick in 2028 | To Edmonton Oilers Devon Levi; 7th-round pick in 2028 | |
| July 1, 2026 | To San Jose Sharks Darnell Nurse | To Edmonton Oilers Shakir Mukhamadullin; Zack Sharp | |
| October 7, 2026 | To Pittsburgh Penguins Spencer Stastney | To Edmonton Oilers Filip Hållander | |

=== Players acquired ===
| Date | Player | Former team | Term | Via | Ref |
|---|---|---|---|---|---|
| July 1, 2026 | Frederik Andersen | Carolina Hurricanes | 1-year | Free agency | |
| July 1, 2026 | Mathieu Joseph | Los Angeles Kings | 1-year | Free agency | |
| July 1, 2026 | Ryan Shea | Pittsburgh Penguins | 5-year | Free agency | |
| July 1, 2026 | Eduards Tralmaks | Detroit Red Wings | 1-year | Free agency | |
| September 9, 2026 | Alex Formenton | HC Ambrì-Piotta (NL) | 1-year | Free agency | |

=== Players lost ===
| Date | Player | New team | Term | Via | Ref |
|---|---|---|---|---|---|
| July 1, 2026 | Cam Dineen | Philadelphia Flyers | 2-year | Free agency | |
| July 1, 2026 | James Hamblin | Anaheim Ducks | 2-year | Free agency | |
| July 1, 2026 | Calvin Pickard | Minnesota Wild | 1-year | Free agency | |
| July 1, 2026 | Samuel Poulin | Montreal Canadiens | 1-year | Free agency | |
| July 1, 2026 | Jack Roslovic | Toronto Maple Leafs | 2-year | Free agency | |
| August 1, 2026 | Matvey Petrov | Khimik Voskresensk (VHL) | 2-year | Free agency | |
| August 25, 2026 | Josh Bloom | Providence Bruins (AHL) | 1-year | Free agency | |
| September 11, 2026 | Connor Ingram | | | Retirement | |
| September 17, 2026 | Curtis Lazar | Lausanne HC (NL) | 1-year | Free agency | |

=== Signings ===
| Date | Player | Term | Ref |
|---|---|---|---|
| July 1, 2026 | Max Jones | 1-year | |
| July 1, 2026 | Kasperi Kapanen | 1-year | |
| July 4, 2026 | Shakir Mukhamadullin | 2-year | |
| July 5, 2026 | Spencer Stastney | 1-year | |
| July 6, 2026 | Owen Michaels | 2-year | |
| July 12, 2026 | Colton Dach | 2-year | |

== Draft picks ==
Below are the Edmonton Oilers' selections at the 2026 NHL entry draft, which were held on June 26 to 27, 2026. It was held at the KeyBank Center in Buffalo, New York.

| Round | # | Player | Pos | Nationality | College/Junior/Club team (League) |
|---|---|---|---|---|---|
| 2 | 58 | Rudolfs Berzkalns | C | Latvia | Muskegon Lumberjacks (USHL) |
| 3 | 84 | Malcom Gastrin | LW | Sweden | Modo Hockey U20 (J20 Nationell) |
| 5 | 133 | Andrew Robinson | D | Canada | Windsor Spitfires (OHL) |
| 6 | 180 | Caden Harvey | C | United States | Windsor Spitfires (OHL) |
| 7 | 221 | Ryan Cameron | G | United States | Cedar Rapids RoughRiders (USHL) |
