= Jacob Fowler =

American ice hockey player (born 2004)

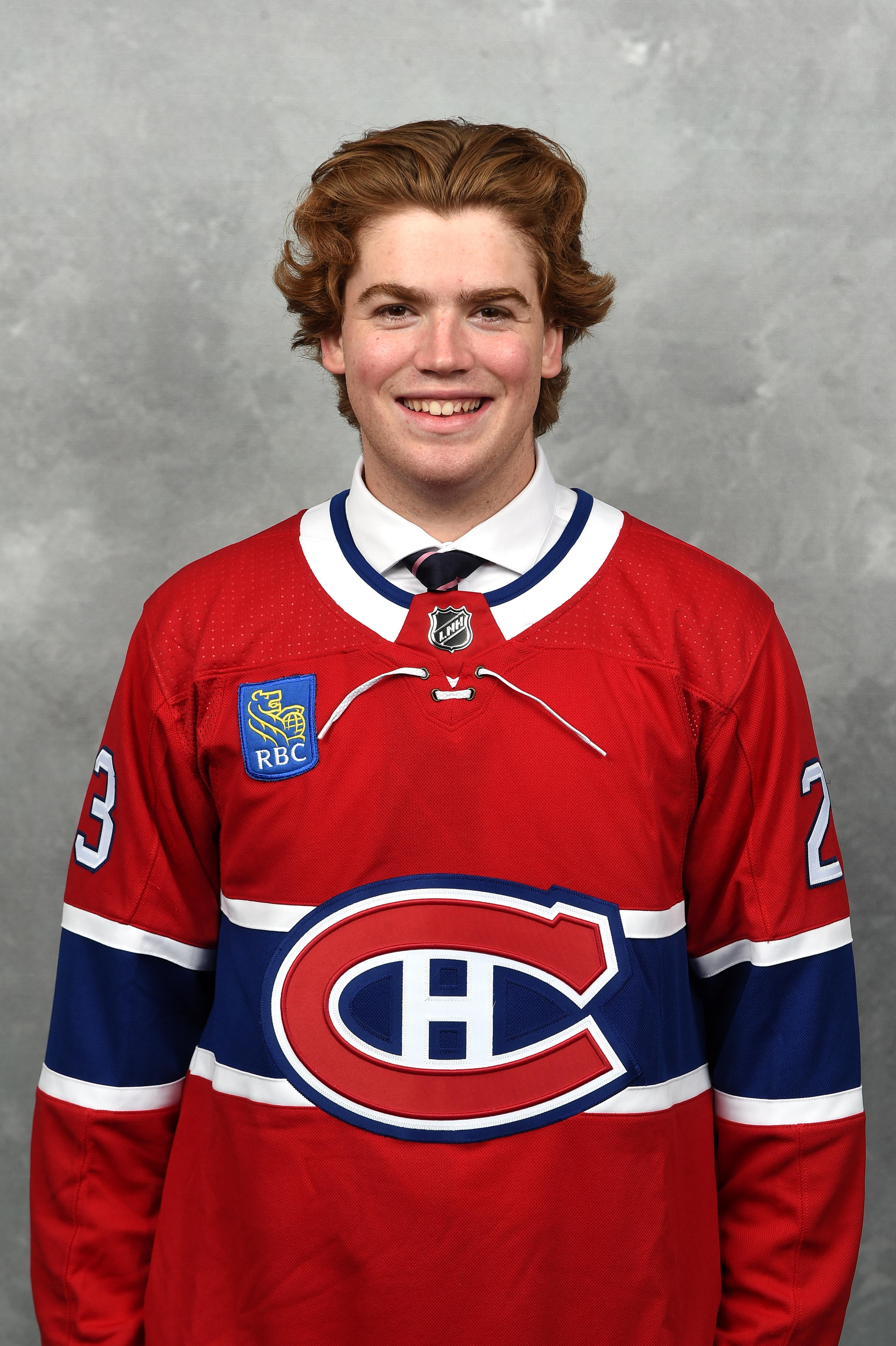
- Fowler in 2023
- Born: November 24, 2004 (age 21) Melbourne, Florida, U.S.
- Height: 6 ft 2 in (188 cm)
- Weight: 211 lb (96 kg; 15 st 1 lb)
- Position: Goaltender
- Catches: Left
- NHL team: Montreal Canadiens
- NHL draft: 69th overall, 2023; Montreal Canadiens
- Playing career: 2025–present

Jacob Fowler (born November 24, 2004) is an American professional ice hockey player who is a goaltender for the Montreal Canadiens of the National Hockey League (NHL). He was selected in the third round, 69th overall, by the Canadiens in the 2023 NHL entry draft.

== Playing career ==
=== Early years ===
Originally beginning his minor ice hockey career as a forward, Fowler would make the full-time transition to goaltender prior to age 10. As a youth, he played with the Florida Alliance based in Estero, Florida, a three-plus hour commute from his hometown of Melbourne. Thereafter, Fowler spent two seasons with the Youngstown Phantoms of the United States Hockey League (USHL). Appearing in 18 total games over the course of the 2021–22 season, he posted a 11–4–1 record along with a 2.18 goals against average (GAA) and a .927 save percentage. The following season, Fowler played in 40 games, leading all USHL goaltenders in wins, GAA and save percentage respectively. During that year's playoffs, he posted an 8–1–0 record, with a 1.36 GAA and .952 save percentage. Fowler then went 3–0–0 in the championship round with a 0.64 GAA, .976 save percentage and a 22-save shutout in the final game to help guide the Phantoms to their first Clark Cup in program history. He was subsequently named the Clark Cup Most Outstanding Player. Following an outstanding season, he was named to the All-USHL First team, as well as earning both USHL Goaltender of the Year and Dave Peterson Goalie of the Year distinctions.

On June 29, 2023, Fowler was selected in the third round, 69th overall, by the Montreal Canadiens in the 2023 NHL entry draft.

=== Collegiate ===
Fowler began his collegiate career at Boston College for the 2023–24 season. He started all six games for the Eagles in the month of October, posting a 5–1–0 record which ranked second in Hockey East and sixth nationally with an .833 winning percentage, earning Hockey East Goaltender of the Month honors. Fowler subsequently made eight starts for the Eagles in November, and was named Hockey East Goaltender of the Month for the second consecutive month. On November 18, 2023, he recorded his first career NCAA shutout in a game against UConn. Collectively, Fowler finished Hockey East conference play with a 19–3–1 record, ranking first in both wins (19) and save percentage (.925), as well as third in GAA (2.20), and was recognized as Hockey East Goaltending Champion.

During the 2024 Hockey East tournament, he made 62 saves and allowed just three goals between the Hockey East semifinals and championship games, helping the Eagles capture their 12th Hockey East tournament title, and was named to the Hockey East All-Tournament Team. Fowler registered his 31st win of the season during the regional finals of the 2024 NCAA Division I tournament, setting an NCAA record for wins by a freshman, surpassing the previous high of 30 set by Al Montoya during the 2002–03 season. For his efforts, he was named to the All-Hockey East First Team and All-Hockey East Rookie Team. He was likewise named a AHCA East First Team All-American and selected as a top-three finalist for the Mike Richter Award. Overall, Fowler finished his freshman campaign with a 32–6–1 record, ranking first across the NCAA in winning percentage (.855), fourth in save percentage (.926) and eighth in GAA (2.14).

Through eight games to begin his sophomore season, Fowler held a 7–1 record, along with an 1.26 GAA and a .950 save percentage. On November 15, 2024, in a game against UConn, he was assessed a match penalty and was ejected after delivering a blocker punch to Huskies forward Tristan Fraser after the foregoing scored a goal against him. Fowler was subsequently suspended for one game as a result of his actions. In his return on November 22 versus Northeastern, he recorded his fourth shutout of the 2024–25 season. In January 2025, Fowler, along with teammates Ryan Leonard and Gabe Perreault, were longlisted as recipient of the Hobey Baker Award recognizing the top NCAA Division I men's ice hockey player. After finishing the 2024–25 season with a 25–7–2 record, ranking second across the NCAA in GAA (1.63) and shutouts (7), as well as third in save percentage (.940), he earned All-Hockey East First Team, AHCA East First Team All-American, as well as Hockey East Goaltending Champion distinction for a second straight year. His 1.63 GAA was the lowest ever by an Eagles goaltender, while his seven shutouts were the third most registered in single season. In April 2025, Fowler edged out fellow netminders Trey Augustine (Michigan State), Albin Boija (UMaine) and Alex Tracy (Minnesota State) to win the Mike Richter Award as the top goaltender in NCAA Division I. With this, he joined Thatcher Demko, the 2016 recipient, as the only winners in Boston College program history.

=== Professional ===
On April 4, 2025, Fowler agreed to a three-year, entry-level deal with the Montreal Canadiens. He was initially assigned on an amateur tryout (ATO) basis to join the team's American Hockey League (AHL) affiliate, the Laval Rocket, for the remainder of the 2024–25 season. On April 12, Fowler would make his professional debut, posting 25 saves in a 2–1 win over the Syracuse Crunch. Laval would finish the regular season tied with Syracuse for the fewest goals allowed, but Fowler had not played enough games to qualify as a co-recipient of the Harry "Hap" Holmes Memorial Award.

Following an injury to Canadiens' starting goaltender Sam Montembeault amidst the opening round of the 2025 Stanley Cup playoffs, Cayden Primeau was recalled by Montreal to serve as their backup goaltender, resulting in Fowler assuming Laval's starter role for their first round Calder Cup playoffs series against the Cleveland Monsters. He made his AHL playoff debut on April 30, backstopping the Rocket to a 3–2 victory. Fowler recorded his first professional shutout in a 4–0 win during game 2. He would ultimately appear in six postseason games, managing three wins and three losses over the course of the Rocket's run to the Eastern Conference Finals.

Fowler started the 2025–26 season playing with the Rocket, managing a 10–5–0 record with a .919 save percentage in his first 15 games. Simultaneously, Canadiens' goaltenders Montembeault and Jakub Dobeš performed poorly in the first two months of the NHL season. Following the Canadiens' 6–1 loss to the Tampa Bay Lightning on December 9, a contest in which Montembeault and Dobeš allowed three goals each, it was announced that Fowler had been called up alongside Rocket teammates Owen Beck and Adam Engström. He made his NHL debut on December 11, making 36 saves in a 4–2 victory over the Pittsburgh Penguins. Fowler faced the Penguins for a second time on December 20, recording his first NHL shutout. On January 16 he was returned to the Rocket roster, having appeared in ten games for the Canadiens with a 4–4–2 record. Fowler was one of three Rocket players named to participate in the 2026 AHL All-Star Classic. He was called up by the Canadiens again on March 11 ahead of the game at Ottawa. He remained in Montreal for the remainder of the season, serving as the backup goaltender for Dobeš, and finishing with a 9–6–2 record and a .908 save percentage in the NHL. Fowler made his NHL playoff debut on May 16, appearing in relief of Dobeš in Game 6 of the Canadiens' second round series against the Buffalo Sabres.

In advance of the 2026–27 season, Canadiens general manager Kent Hughes stated that the team would not begin the season with three goaltenders on the roster, in what was widely considered a contest between Fowler and Montembeault for the backup role behind Dobeš. With the latter securing the spot, it was announced on September 27 that Fowler would be sent down to Laval for the start of the season. However, after Montembeault sustained an apparent injury in practice on October 7, the Canadiens recalled Fowler to the NHL, and he made his season debut the following day versus the Nashville Predators. With Dobeš struggling in October, Fowler took on a greater role with the team. He became the youngest goaltender to start in a league outdoor game when he backstopped the Canadiens to a 2–1 victory in the 2026 NHL Heritage Classic on October 25, and the following day was named NHL's third star of the week. Fowler was then named the NHL's Rookie of the Month for October, a period in which he had a 7–1–0 record with a 1.84 goals against average, .932 save percentage and two shutouts.

== International play ==
Medal record

Men's ice hockey

Representing the United States

World Junior Championships
Gold medal – first place	2024 Sweden	

World Junior A Challenge
Gold medal – first place	2022 Canada	

Internationally, Fowler first represented the United States junior team at the 2023 World Junior A Challenge, capturing gold and earned player of the game honors in the championship final. Fowler was again named to his country's national junior team to compete at the 2024 World Junior Championships. He won all three games he started during tournament play en route to a gold medal victory.

== Personal life ==
Fowler was born to parents Kerri and Jay, who both work as lawyers. He has one sibling, a brother named Jay Jay.

Fowler attended South Kent School located in northwestern Connecticut, before enrolling at Boston College. After completing two years in college, Fowler left full-time studies to begin his professional hockey career, but he has continued taking online courses with the aim of eventually earning a degree in communications.

== Career statistics ==
=== Regular season and playoffs ===
			Regular season									Playoffs
Season	Team	League	GP	W	L	T/OT	MIN	GA	SO	GAA	SV%	GP	W	L	MIN	GA	SO	GAA	SV%
2021–22	Youngstown Phantoms	USHL	18	11	4	1	963	35	2	2.18	.927	1	0	1	59	3	0	.889	3.07
2022–23	Youngstown Phantoms	USHL	40	27	9	4	2,318	88	5	2.28	.921	9	8	1	575	13	1	.952	1.36
2023–24	Boston College	HE	39	32	6	1	2,326	83	3	2.14	.926	—	—	—	—	—	—	—	—
2024–25	Boston College	HE	35	25	7	2	2,063	56	7	1.63	.940	—	—	—	—	—	—	—	—
2024–25	Laval Rocket	AHL	3	2	1	0	181	7	0	2.32	.914	8	3	3	387	16	1	2.48	.902
2025–26	Laval Rocket	AHL	27	19	7	1	1,618	60	3	2.23	.916	—	—	—	—	—	—	—	—
2025–26	Montreal Canadiens	NHL	17	9	6	2	1,011	41	1	2.43	.908	1	0	0	8	1	0	7.16	.500
NHL totals			17	9	6	2	1,011	41	1	2.43	.908	1	0	0	8	1	0	7.16	.500

=== International ===
Year	Team	Event	Result	GP	W	L	T	MIN	GA	SO	GAA	SV%
2022	United States	WJAC	1st place, gold medalist(s)	4	4	0	0	240	7	1	1.75	.918
2024	United States	WJC	1st place, gold medalist(s)	3	3	0	0	185	8	0	2.59	.889
Junior totals				7	7	0	0	425	15	1	2.14	.894

== Awards and honors ==
Award	Year	Ref
USHL
All-USHL Second Rookie Team	2022	
USA Hockey All-American Game	2023	
Clark Cup champion	2023	
Clark Cup MVP	2023	
All-USHL First Team	2023	
USHL Goaltender of the Year	2023	
Dave Peterson Goalie of the Year	2023	
College
All-Hockey East First Team	2024, 2025	
All-Hockey East Rookie Team	2024	
All-USCHO First Team	2024, 2025	
Hockey East Goaltending Champion	2024, 2025	
Hockey East All-Tournament Team	2024	
AHCA East First Team All-American	2024, 2025	
New England D1 All-Stars	2024, 2025	
Mike Richter Award	2025	
NHL
Rookie of the Month	October 2026	

== Records ==
Boston College:

- Career GAA: 1.90

NCAA:

- Most wins by a freshman in a single season: 32 (2024)

Awards and achievements
Preceded by Devon Levi	Hockey East Goaltending Champion; 2023–24, 2024–25	Succeeded by Michael Hrabal
Preceded by Kyle McClellan	Mike Richter Award; 2024–25	Succeeded by Trey Augustine
