= 2026–27 New York Rangers season =

National Hockey League season

2026–27 New York Rangers
- Division: Metropolitan
- Conference: Eastern
- 2026–27 record: 13–8–1
- Home record: 9–2–0
- Road record: 4–6–1
- Goals for: 67
- Goals against: 58

Team information
- General manager: Chris Drury
- Coach: Mike Sullivan
- Captain: J. T. Miller
- Alternate captains: Adam Fox; Mika Zibanejad
- Arena: Madison Square Garden
- Minor league affiliates: Hartford Wolf Pack (AHL); Bloomington Bison (ECHL)

Team leaders
- Goals: Alexis Lafrenière (10)
- Assists: Adam Fox (22)
- Points: Adam Fox (24)
- Penalty minutes: J. T. Miller (31)
- Plus/minus: Vladislav Gavrikov; Eeli Tolvanen (+7)
- Wins: Dylan Garand (7)
- Goals against average: joonas Korpisalo (1.67)

The 2026–27 New York Rangers season is the franchise's 100th season of play and their 101st overall season.

On October 1, 2026, during the team home opener against the Tampa Bay Lightning, Igor Shesterkin scored a empty net goaltender goal, becoming the 18th goaltender in NHL history and the first Rangers goaltender to score a goal.

== Standings ==
=== Divisional standings ===
Metropolitan Division
Pos	Team	GP	W	L	OTL	RW	GF	GA	GD	Pts
1	Carolina Hurricanes	23	17	3	3	16	95	53	+42	37
2	New Jersey Devils	23	15	8	0	10	88	73	+15	30
3	New York Rangers	22	13	8	1	13	67	58	+9	27
4	New York Islanders	22	11	6	5	9	71	63	+8	27
5	Philadelphia Flyers	26	9	11	6	8	67	88	−21	24
6	Washington Capitals	21	10	11	0	8	72	83	−11	20
7	Columbus Blue Jackets	21	9	12	0	4	54	68	−14	18
8	Pittsburgh Penguins	22	7	13	2	3	67	80	−13	16

Updated to game(s) played on November 21, 2026. Source: National Hockey League
Rules for classification: 1) Fewer number of games played (GP, only during regular season); 2) Greater number of regulation wins (RW); 3) Greater number of wins in regulation and overtime, excluding shootout wins (ROW); 4) Greater number of total wins, including shootouts (W); 5) Greater number of points earned in head-to-head play; if teams played an uneven number of head-to-head games, the result of the first game on the home ice of the team with the extra home game is discarded; 6) Greater goal differential (GD); 7) Greater number of goals scored (GF)

=== Conference standings ===
Eastern Conference Wild Card
Pos	Div	Team	GP	W	L	OTL	RW	GF	GA	GD	Pts
1	AT	Boston Bruins	23	15	7	1	12	83	61	+22	31
2	AT	Florida Panthers	24	13	8	3	11	76	71	+5	29
3	ME	New York Islanders	22	11	6	5	9	71	63	+8	27
4	ME	Philadelphia Flyers	26	9	11	6	8	67	88	−21	24
5	AT	Buffalo Sabres	23	9	10	4	7	67	81	−14	22
6	ME	Washington Capitals	21	10	11	0	8	72	83	−11	20
7	AT	Detroit Red Wings	23	8	12	3	6	60	71	−11	19
8	AT	Toronto Maple Leafs	25	8	14	3	7	78	90	−12	19
9	ME	Columbus Blue Jackets	21	9	12	0	4	54	68	−14	18
10	ME	Pittsburgh Penguins	22	7	13	2	3	67	80	−13	16

Updated to game(s) played on November 21, 2026. Source: National Hockey League
Rules for classification: 1) Fewer number of games played (GP, only during regular season); 2) Greater number of regulation wins (RW); 3) Greater number of wins in regulation and overtime, excluding shootout wins (ROW); 4) Greater number of total wins, including shootouts (W); 5) Greater number of points earned in head-to-head play; if teams played an uneven number of head-to-head games, the result of the first game on the home ice of the team with the extra home game is discarded; 6) Greater goal differential (GD); 7) Greater number of goals scored (GF)

== Schedule and results ==
=== Preseason ===
The preseason schedule was published on June 24, 2026.

2026 preseason game log: 2–2–0 (home: 1–1–0; road: 1–1–0)

Game	Date	Opponent	Score	OT	Decision	Location	Attendance	Record
1	September 21	@ New Jersey	2–3		Garand	Prudential Center	11,156	0–1–0
2	September 22	NY Islanders	3–4		Martin	Madison Square Garden	16,603	0–2–0
3	September 24	New Jersey	4–3	SO	Korpisalo	Madison Square Garden	16,078	1–2–0
4	September 25	@ NY Islanders	6–1		Shesterkin	UBS Arena	14,034	2–2–0

=== Regular season ===
The regular season schedule was published on July 16, 2026.

2026–27 game log
September: 0–1–0, 0 points (home: 0–0–0; road: 0–1–0)

Game	Date	Opponent	Score	OT	Decision	Location	Attendance	Record	Points	Recap
1	September 29	@ Boston	0–3		Shesterkin	TD Garden	17,850	0–1–0	0	

October: 7–5–1, 15 points (home: 6–1–0; road: 1–4–1)

Game	Date	Opponent	Score	OT	Decision	Location	Attendance	Record	Points	Recap
2	October 1	Tampa Bay	5–1		Shesterkin	Madison Square Garden	18,006	1–1–0	2	
3	October 2	@ Detroit	2–0		Garand	Little Caesars Arena	19,515	2–1–0	4	
4	October 4	Utah	4–2		Shesterkin	Madison Square Garden	17,377	3–1–0	6	
5	October 6	NY Islanders	5–2		Shesterkin	Madison Square Garden	18,006	4–1–0	8	
6	October 9	@ Washington	1–3		Garand	Capital One Arena	17,992	4–2–0	8	
7	October 11	Vancouver	6–2		Garand	Madison Square Garden	18,006	5–2–0	10	
8	October 13	Tampa Bay	4–1		Garand	Madison Square Garden	17,076	6–2–0	12	
9	October 15	@ New Jersey	1–7		Garand	Prudential Center	16,527	6–3–0	12	
10	October 17	@ Columbus	0–1	OT	Garand	Nationwide Arena	16,021	6–3–1	13	
11	October 19	Anaheim	5–2		Garand	Madison Square Garden	18,006	7–3–1	15	
12	October 22	@ Toronto	4–5		Garand	Scotiabank Arena	18,872	7–4–1	15	
13	October 24	@ Ottawa	4–7		Garand	Canadian Tire Centre	15,034	7–5–1	15	
14	October 26	Los Angeles	3–6		Garand	Madison Square Garden	18,006	7–6–1	15	

November: 6–2–0, 12 points (home: 3–1–0; road: 3–1–0)

Game	Date	Opponent	Score	OT	Decision	Location	Attendance	Record	Points	Recap
15	November 1	Edmonton	1–4		Garand	Madison Square Garden	18,006	7–7–1	15	
16	November 3	St. Louis	3–2		Garand	Madison Square Garden	16,950	8–7–1	17	
17	November 5	Philadelphia	3–2		Garand	Madison Square Garden	18,006	9–7–1	19	
18	November 7	@ Seattle	4–3		Korpisalo	Climate Pledge Arena	17,151	10–7–1	21	
19	November 9	@ Edmonton	1–3		Garand	Rogers Place	17,047	10–8–1	21	
20	November 11	@ Calgary	3–1		Korpisalo	Scotiabank Saddledome	17,298	11–8–1	23	
21	November 13	@ Vancouver	5–1		Garand	Rogers Arena	17,156	12-8-1	25	
22	November 16	Montreal	3–1		Korpisalo	Madison Square Garden	18,006	13-8-1	27	
23	November 22	Carolina	–			Madison Square Garden				
24	November 25	@ Buffalo	–			KeyBank Center				
25	November 27	@ Chicago	–			United Center				
26	November 28	Calgary	–			Madison Square Garden				
27	November 30	Carolina	–			Madison Square Garden				

December: 0–0–0, 0 points (home: 0–0–0; road: 0–0–0)

Game	Date	Opponent	Score	OT	Decision	Location	Attendance	Record	Points	Recap
28	December 3	San Jose	–			Madison Square Garden				
29	December 5	Colorado	–			Madison Square Garden				
30	December 7	New Jersey	–			Madison Square Garden				
31	December 8	@ Carolina	–			Lenovo Center				
32	December 11	@ Detroit	–			Little Caesars Arena				
33	December 13	Columbus	–			Madison Square Garden				
34	December 15	@ New Jersey	–			Prudential Center				
35	December 16	@ Philadelphia	–			Xfinity Mobile Arena				
36	December 18	Nashville	–			Madison Square Garden				
37	December 20	@ NY Islanders	–			UBS Arena				
38	December 22	New Jersey	–			Madison Square Garden				
39	December 27	@ St. Louis	–			Enterprise Center				
40	December 29	Detroit	–			Madison Square Garden				
41	December 31	@ Dallas	–			American Airlines Center				

January: 0–0–0, 0 points (home: 0–0–0; road: 0–0–0)

Game	Date	Opponent	Score	OT	Decision	Location	Attendance	Record	Points	Recap
42	January 3	Columbus	–			Madison Square Garden				
43	January 5	@ Columbus	–			Nationwide Arena				
44	January 7	Chicago	–			Madison Square Garden				
45	January 9	@ San Jose	–			SAP Center				
46	January 11	@ Los Angeles	–			Crypto.com Arena				
47	January 12	@ Anaheim	–			Honda Center				
48	January 16	Boston	–			Madison Square Garden				
49	January 17	Dallas	–			Madison Square Garden				
50	January 19	Philadelphia	–			Madison Square Garden				
51	January 21	@ Winnipeg	–			Canada Life Centre				
52	January 23	@ Minnesota	–			Grand Casino Arena				
53	January 25	Seattle	–			Madison Square Garden				
54	January 27	Florida	–			Madison Square Garden				
55	January 29	@ Pittsburgh	–			PPG Paints Arena				
56	January 30	@ Ottawa	–			Canadian Tire Centre				

February: 0–0–0, 0 points (home: 0–0–0; road: 0–0–0)

Game	Date	Opponent	Score	OT	Decision	Location	Attendance	Record	Points	Recap
57	February 3	Winnipeg	–			Madison Square Garden				
58	February 12	NY Islanders	–			Madison Square Garden				
59	February 14	@ Montreal	–			Bell Centre				
60	February 15	Buffalo	–			Madison Square Garden				
61	February 18	@ NY Islanders	–			UBS Arena				
62	February 20	@ Philadelphia	–			Xfinity Mobile Arena				
63	February 21	@ Carolina	–			Lenovo Center				
64	February 23	@ Washington	–			Capital One Arena				
65	February 26	Washington	–			Madison Square Garden				
66	February 28	@ Pittsburgh	–			PPG Paints Arena				

March: 0–0–0, 0 points (home: 0–0–0; road: 0–0–0)

Game	Date	Opponent	Score	OT	Decision	Location	Attendance	Record	Points	Recap
67	March 3	Boston	–			Madison Square Garden				
68	March 6	@ Buffalo	–			KeyBank Center				
69	March 7	Vegas	–			Madison Square Garden				
70	March 9	@ Utah	–			Delta Center				
71	March 11	@ Colorado	–			Ball Arena				
72	March 13	@ Vegas	–			T-Mobile Arena				
73	March 16	Ottawa	–			Madison Square Garden				
74	March 18	Toronto	–			Madison Square Garden				
75	March 20	Pittsburgh	–			Madison Square Garden				
76	March 21	Washington	–			Madison Square Garden				
77	March 23	@ Nashville	–			Bridgestone Arena				
78	March 25	@ Florida	–			Amerant Bank Arena				
79	March 27	@ Tampa Bay	–			Benchmark International Arena				
80	March 29	Minnesota	–			Madison Square Garden				

April: 0–0–0, 0 points (home: 0–0–0; road: 0–0–0)

Game	Date	Opponent	Score	OT	Decision	Location	Attendance	Record	Points	Recap
81	April 1	@ Montreal	–			Bell Centre				
82	April 3	Florida	–			Madison Square Garden				
83	April 6	Pittsburgh	–			Madison Square Garden				
84	April 10	Toronto	–			Madison Square Garden				

Legend: Win (2 points) Loss (0 points) Overtime/shootout loss (1 point)

== Roster ==
Updated November 21, 2026

No.	Nat	Player	Pos	S/G	Age	Acquired	Birthplace
28	(Denmark)	Oliver Bjorkstrand	RW	R	31	2026	Herning, Denmark
49	(Czech Republic)	Jaroslav Chmelař	RW	R	23	2021	Nové Město nad Metují, Czech Republic
50	(Canada)	Will Cuylle	LW	L	24	2020	Toronto, Ontario
16	(Russia)	Pavel Dorofeyev	RW	L	26	2026	Nizhny Tagil, Russia
5	(Canada)	Sean Durzi	D	R	28	2026	Toronto, Ontario
23	(United States)	Adam Fox (A)	D	R	28	2019	Jericho, New York
33	(Canada)	Dylan Garand	G	L	24	2020	Victoria, British Columbia
44	(Russia)	Vladislav Gavrikov	D	L	31	2025	Yaroslavl, Russia
15	(Canada)	Glenn Gawdin	C	R	29	2026	Richmond, British Columbia
43	(United States)	Luke Glendening	C	R	37	2026	East Grand Rapids, Michigan
24	(Canada)	Tye Kartye	LW	L	25	2026	Kingston, Ontario
70	(Finland)	Joonas Korpisalo	G	L	32	2026	Pori, Finland
42	(United States)	Noah Laba	C	R	23	2022	Northville, Michigan
13	(Canada)	Alexis Lafrenière	LW	L	25	2020	Saint-Eustache, Quebec
10	(United States)	J. T. Miller (C)	C	L	33	2025	East Palestine, Ohio
60	(United States)	Scott Morrow	D	R	24	2025	Darien, Connecticut
94	(United States)	Gabe Perreault	RW	R	21	2023	Sherbrooke, Quebec
26	(Sweden)	Marcus Pettersson	D	L	30	2026	Skellefteå, Sweden
14	(Canada)	Taylor Raddysh	RW	R	28	2025	Caledon, Ontario
73	(Canada)	Matt Rempe	C	R	24	2020	Calgary, Alberta
29	(Canada)	Matthew Robertson	D	L	25	2019	Edmonton, Alberta
63	(United States)	Max Sasson	C	L	26	2026	Birmingham, Michigan
4	(Canada)	Braden Schneider	D	R	25	2020	Prince Albert, Saskatchewan
31	(Russia)	Igor Shesterkin	G	L	30	2014	Moscow, Russia
38	(Slovakia)	Adam Sýkora	LW	L	22	2022	Piešťany, Slovakia
12	(Latvia)	Alberts Šmits	D	L	18	2026	Valmiera, Latvia
17	(Finland)	Eeli Tolvanen	RW	L	27	2026	Vihti, Finland
90	(Canada)	Joe Veleno	C	L	26	2026	Montreal, Quebec
93	(Sweden)	Mika Zibanejad (A)	C	R	33	2016	Huddinge, Sweden

== Player statistics ==
=== Skaters ===
As of September 14, 2026

Regular season
Player	GP	G	A	Pts	+/−	PIM

=== Goaltenders ===
Regular season
Player	GP	GS	TOI	W	L	OT	GA	GAA	SA	SV%	SO	G	A	PIM

- ^{†} Denotes player spent time with another team before joining the Rangers. Stats reflect time with the Rangers only.
- ^{‡} Denotes player was traded mid-season. Stats reflect time with the Rangers only.
- Bold/italics denotes franchise record.

== Awards and honors ==
=== Awards ===
Regular season
Player	Award	Date

=== Milestones ===
Regular season
Player	Milestone	Reached
Igor Shesterkin	1st NHL career goal (empty-netter)	October 2, 2026
Dylan Garand	1st NHL career shutout	October 2, 2026
Cole Beaudoin	1st NHL career game	October 6, 2026
Alexis Lafrenière	3rd NHL career hat-trick	October 6, 2026

=== Records ===
Regular season

== Transactions ==
The Rangers have been involved in the following transactions during the 2026–27 season.

=== Trades ===
Date	Details		Ref
July 1, 2026	To Boston Bruins Kalle Väisänen; 4th-round pick in 2028	To New York Rangers Joonas Korpisalo	
July 1, 2026	To Utah Mammoth Vincent Trocheck	To New York Rangers Cole Beaudoin; Sean Durzi conditional TOR 3rd-round pick in 2027 or UTA 3rd-round pick in 2027	
July 1, 2026	To Vancouver Canucks conditional 1st-round pick in 2030 or 1st-round pick in 2031	To New York Rangers Marcus Pettersson	
July 1, 2026	To Boston Bruins Will Borgen	To New York Rangers 2nd-round pick in 2027 conditional 2nd-round pick in 2028 or 3rd-round pick in 2028	

=== Free agents ===
Date	Player	Team	Contract term	Ref
July 1, 2026	Joe Veleno	from Montreal Canadiens	1-year	
July 1, 2026	Jonny Brodzinski	to Washington Capitals	1-year	
July 1, 2026	Trey Fix-Wolansky	to Vancouver Canucks	1-year	
July 1, 2026	Oliver Bjorkstrand	from Tampa Bay Lightning	1-year	
July 1, 2026	Marc Del Gaizo	from Montreal Canadiens	2-year	
July 1, 2026	Conor Sheary	to Buffalo Sabres	1-year	
July 1, 2026	Connor Mackey	to Chicago Blackhawks	2-year	
July 1, 2026	Glenn Gawdin	from Los Angeles Kings	2-year	
July 1, 2026	Casey Fitzgerald	to Florida Panthers	1-year	
July 2, 2026	Dennis Cholowski	from New Jersey Devils	2-year	
September 1, 2026	Eeli Tolvanen	from Seattle Kraken	1-year	
September 4, 2026	Brendan Brisson	to Toronto Maple Leafs	1-year	

=== Waivers ===
Date	Player	Team	Ref

=== Contract terminations ===
Date	Player	Via	Ref

=== Retirement ===
Date	Player	Ref

=== Signings ===
Date	Player	Term	Ref
July 6, 2026	William Trudeau	1-year	
July 13, 2026	Braden Schneider	1-year	
July 15, 2026	Alberts Šmits	3-year†	
August 19, 2026	Scott Morrow	1-year	
August 21, 2026	Vincent Iorio	1-year	

==== Key ====
† Contract is entry-level.

‡ Contract takes effect in the 2027–28 season.

== Draft picks ==
Below are the New York Rangers' selections at the 2026 NHL entry draft, which was held on June 26 and 27, 2026, at KeyBank Center in Buffalo, New York.

Round	#	Player	Pos	Nationality	College/junior/club team
1	5	Alberts Šmits	D	Latvia	EHC Red Bull München (DEL)
2	64	Ben Macbeath	D	Canada	Calgary Hitmen (WHL)
3	67	Danai Shaiikov	G	Kazakhstan	Gatineau Olympiques (QMJHL)
3	77	Charlie Morrison	D	Canada	Quebec Remparts (QMJHL)
3	81	Tomáš Chrenko	C	Slovakia	HK Nitra (Slovak Extraliga)
4	102	Spencer Bowes	LW	Canada	Ottawa 67's (OHL)
6	162	Andre Mondoux	D	Canada	Kingston Frontenacs (OHL)
6	163	Darian Anderson	RW	United States	Flint Firebirds (OHL)
7	193	Ivan Patrikhayev	D	Russia	HC CSKA Moscow (KHL)
