= 2026–27 Nashville Predators season =

National Hockey League team season

2026–27 Nashville Predators
- Division: Central
- Conference: Eastern
- 2026–27 record: 12–6–5
- Home record: 7–3–2
- Road record: 5–3–3
- Goals for: 71
- Goals against: 69

Team information
- General manager: Chris MacFarland
- Coach: Andrew Brunette
- Captain: Roman Josi
- Alternate captains: Jack Drury; Filip Forsberg; Ryan O'Reilly; Steven Stamkos
- Arena: Bridgestone Arena
- Minor league affiliates: Milwaukee Admirals (AHL); Atlanta Gladiators (ECHL)

Team leaders
- Goals: Steven Stamkos (12)
- Assists: Roman Josi (21)
- Points: Filip Forsberg (25)
- Penalty minutes: Adam Edström; Nicolas Hague (19)
- Plus/minus: Filip Forsberg; Nils Höglander (+9)
- Wins: Juuse Saros (8)
- Goals against average: Matt Murray (1.85)

The 2026–27 Nashville Predators season is the 28th season for the National Hockey League franchise that was established on June 25, 1997.

== Standings ==
=== Divisional standings ===
Central Division
Pos	Team	GP	W	L	OTL	RW	GF	GA	GD	Pts
1	Minnesota Wild	25	17	3	5	16	90	56	+34	39
2	Dallas Stars	22	14	6	2	8	64	56	+8	30
3	Colorado Avalanche	23	13	7	3	13	90	68	+22	29
4	Nashville Predators	23	12	6	5	9	71	69	+2	29
5	Utah Mammoth	24	12	9	3	10	80	81	−1	27
6	St. Louis Blues	23	12	9	2	11	77	73	+4	26
7	Winnipeg Jets	24	11	9	4	8	75	82	−7	26
8	Chicago Blackhawks	23	7	14	2	4	58	93	−35	16

Updated to game(s) played on November 21, 2026. Source: National Hockey League
Rules for classification: 1) Fewer number of games played (GP, only during regular season); 2) Greater number of regulation wins (RW); 3) Greater number of wins in regulation and overtime, excluding shootout wins (ROW); 4) Greater number of total wins, including shootouts (W); 5) Greater number of points earned in head-to-head play; if teams played an uneven number of head-to-head games, the result of the first game on the home ice of the team with the extra home game is discarded; 6) Greater goal differential (GD); 7) Greater number of goals scored (GF)

=== Conference standings ===
Western Conference Wild Card
Pos	Div	Team	GP	W	L	OTL	RW	GF	GA	GD	Pts
1	CE	Nashville Predators	23	12	6	5	9	71	69	+2	29
2	CE	Utah Mammoth	24	12	9	3	10	80	81	−1	27
3	CE	St. Louis Blues	23	12	9	2	11	77	73	+4	26
4	CE	Winnipeg Jets	24	11	9	4	8	75	82	−7	26
5	PA	Anaheim Ducks	24	11	12	1	10	87	92	−5	23
6	PA	Calgary Flames	24	10	12	2	9	60	84	−24	22
7	PA	Seattle Kraken	20	10	9	1	7	67	71	−4	21
8	PA	Los Angeles Kings	21	7	12	2	4	58	70	−12	16
9	CE	Chicago Blackhawks	23	7	14	2	4	58	93	−35	16
10	PA	Vancouver Canucks	25	6	18	1	3	71	108	−37	13

Updated to game(s) played on November 21, 2026. Source: National Hockey League
Rules for classification: 1) Fewer number of games played (GP, only during regular season); 2) Greater number of regulation wins (RW); 3) Greater number of wins in regulation and overtime, excluding shootout wins (ROW); 4) Greater number of total wins, including shootouts (W); 5) Greater number of points earned in head-to-head play; if teams played an uneven number of head-to-head games, the result of the first game on the home ice of the team with the extra home game is discarded; 6) Greater goal differential (GD); 7) Greater number of goals scored (GF)

== Schedule ==
=== Preseason ===
The preseason schedule was announced on June 25, 2026.

2026–27 game log

2026 preseason game log: 1–3–0 (home: 1–1–0; away: 0–2–0)
#	Date	Visitor	Score	Home	OT	Decision	Attendance	Record	Recap
1	September 20	Nashville	1–2	Tampa Bay		Saros	13,374	0–1–0	Recap
2	September 22	Tampa Bay	2–3	Nashville		Annunen	17,690	1–1–0	Recap
3	September 24	Nashville	5–6	Carolina		Annunen	13,863	1–2–0	Recap
4	September 26	Carolina	6–0	Nashville		Saros	17,286	1–3–0	Recap

Legend: Win Loss Overtime/shootout loss

=== Regular season ===
The regular season schedule was announced on July 16, 2026.

2026–27 game log: 12–6–5 (home: 6–3–2; away: 6–3–3)

October: 5–4–5 (home: 4–3–2; road: 1–1–3)
#	Date	Visitor	Score	Home	OT	Decision	Location	Attendance	Record	Pts	Recap
1	October 1	Minnesota	3–1	Nashville		Saros	Bridgestone Arena	17,284	0–1–0	0	Recap
2	October 3	Dallas	1–2	Nashville		Saros	Bridgestone Arena	17,260	1–1–0	2	Recap
3	October 6	Nashville	4–5	Toronto	OT	Saros	Scotiabank Arena	18,792	1–1–1	3	Recap
4	October 8	Nashville	5–2	Montreal		Saros	Bell Centre	20,962	2–1–1	5	Recap
5	October 10	Nashville	2–3	Ottawa	SO	Murray	Canadian Tire Centre	15,025	2–1–2	6	Recap
6	October 13	Vegas	5–2	Nashville		Saros	Bridgestone Arena	17,229	2–2–2	6	Recap
7	October 15	San Jose	3–2	Nashville	SO	Saros	Bridgestone Arena	17,181	2–2–3	7	Recap
8	October 17	St. Louis	2–5	Nashville		Saros	Bridgestone Arena	17,159	3–2–3	9	Recap
9	October 22	Nashville	0–6	Boston		Annunen	TD Garden	17,850	3–3–3	9	Recap
10	October 24	Nashville	2–3	Pittsburgh	OT	Saros	PPG Paints Arena	18,191	3–3–4	10	Recap
11	October 25	Colorado	2–6	Nashville		Annunen	Bridgestone Arena	17,191	4–3–4	12	Recap
12	October 27	NY Islanders	4–3	Nashville	SO	Saros	Bridgestone Arena	17,159	4–3–5	13	Recap
13	October 29	Washington	4–3	Nashville		Saros	Bridgestone Arena	17,159	4–4–5	13	Recap
14	October 31	Tampa Bay	4–5	Nashville	SO	Annunen	Bridgestone Arena	17,180	5–4–5	15	Recap

November: 7–2–0 (home: 3–0–0; road: 4–2–0)
#	Date	Visitor	Score	Home	OT	Decision	Location	Attendance	Record	Pts	Recap
15	November 3	Carolina	1–4	Nashville		Saros	Bridgestone Arena	17,159	6–4–5	17	Recap
16	November 5	Nashville	3–2	Colorado	OT	Annunen	Ball Arena	18,085	7–4–5	19	Recap
17	November 7	St. Louis	1–3	Nashville		Saros	Bridgestone Arena	17,159	8–4–5	21	Recap
18	November 10	Nashville	3–0	Los Angeles		Saros	Crypto.com Arena	15,008	9–4–5	23	Recap
19	November 11	Nashville	4–2	Anaheim		Annunen	Honda Center	17,174	10–4–5	25	Recap
20	November 13	Nashville	3–2	Vegas	SO	Saros	T-Mobile Arena	16,641	11–4–5	27	Recap
21	November 15	Nashville	2–4	San Jose		Saros	SAP Center	14,949	11–5–5	27	Recap
22	November 17	Nashville	3–7	Minnesota		Annunen	Grand Casino Arena	18,807	11–6–5	27	Recap
23	November 21	Pittsburgh	3–4	Nashville		Saros	Bridgestone Arena	17,487	12–6–5	29	Recap
24	November 25	Nashville		Dallas			American Airlines Center
25	November 27	Utah		Nashville			Bridgestone Arena
26	November 28	Nashville		Detroit			Little Caesars Arena
27	November 30	Ottawa		Nashville			Bridgestone Arena

December: 0–0–0 (home: 0–0–0; road: 0–0–0)
#	Date	Visitor	Score	Home	OT	Decision	Location	Attendance	Record	Pts	Recap
28	December 3	Chicago		Nashville			Bridgestone Arena
29	December 5	Columbus		Nashville			Bridgestone Arena
30	December 6	Nashville		St. Louis			Enterprise Center
31	December 8	Nashville		Calgary			Scotiabank Saddledome
32	December 10	Nashville		Vancouver			Rogers Arena
33	December 12	Nashville		Seattle			Climate Pledge Arena
34	December 15	Seattle		Nashville			Bridgestone Arena
35	December 18	Nashville		NY Rangers			Madison Square Garden
36	December 20	Nashville		New Jersey			Prudential Center
37	December 22	Winnipeg		Nashville			Bridgestone Arena
38	December 26	Detroit		Nashville			Bridgestone Arena
39	December 28	Nashville		Florida			Amerant Bank Arena
40	December 29	Nashville		Tampa Bay			Benchmark International Arena

January: 0–0–0 (home: 0–0–0; road: 0–0–0)
#	Date	Visitor	Score	Home	OT	Decision	Location	Attendance	Record	Pts	Recap
41	January 1	Florida		Nashville			Bridgestone Arena
42	January 2	Nashville		Carolina			Lenovo Center
43	January 5	Edmonton		Nashville			Bridgestone Arena
44	January 7	Nashville		Winnipeg			Canada Life Centre
45	January 9	Nashville		Minnesota			Grand Casino Arena
46	January 10	Nashville		Colorado			Ball Arena
47	January 12	Philadelphia		Nashville			Bridgestone Arena
48	January 14	Montreal		Nashville			Bridgestone Arena
49	January 16	Nashville		Buffalo			KeyBank Center
50	January 18	Nashville		NY Islanders			UBS Arena
51	January 20	Vancouver		Nashville			Bridgestone Arena
52	January 21	Nashville		Philadelphia			Xfinity Mobile Arena
53	January 23	Los Angeles		Nashville			Bridgestone Arena
54	January 26	Vegas		Nashville			Bridgestone Arena
55	January 28	Nashville		San Jose			SAP Center
56	January 30	Nashville		Anaheim			Honda Center
57	January 31	Nashville		Utah			Delta Center

February: 0–0–0 (home: 0–0–0; road: 0–0–0)
#	Date	Visitor	Score	Home	OT	Decision	Location	Attendance	Record	Pts	Recap
58	February 2	Nashville		Utah			Delta Center
59	February 13	Anaheim		Nashville			Bridgestone Arena
60	February 16	New Jersey		Nashville			Bridgestone Arena
61	February 18	Toronto		Nashville			Bridgestone Arena
62	February 20	Nashville		Columbus			Nationwide Arena
63	February 21	Nashville		Washington			Capital One Arena
64	February 23	Winnipeg		Nashville			Bridgestone Arena
65	February 25	Edmonton		Nashville			Bridgestone Arena
66	February 27	Los Angeles		Nashville			Bridgestone Arena

March: 0–0–0 (home: 0–0–0; road: 0–0–0)
#	Date	Visitor	Score	Home	OT	Decision	Location	Attendance	Record	Pts	Recap
67	March 2	Colorado		Nashville			Bridgestone Arena
68	March 4	Utah		Nashville			Bridgestone Arena
69	March 6	Minnesota		Nashville			Bridgestone Arena
70	March 9	Nashville		St. Louis			Enterprise Center
71	March 11	Nashville		Edmonton			Rogers Place
72	March 13	Nashville		Winnipeg			Canada Life Centre
73	March 15	Nashville		Calgary			Scotiabank Saddledome
74	March 17	Nashville		Vancouver			Rogers Arena
75	March 20	Boston		Nashville			Bridgestone Arena
76	March 23	NY Rangers		Nashville			Bridgestone Arena
77	March 26	Nashville		Chicago			United Center
78	March 27	Nashville		Dallas			American Airlines Center
79	March 30	Buffalo		Nashville			Bridgestone Arena

April: 0–0–0 (home: 0–0–0; road: 0–0–0)
#	Date	Visitor	Score	Home	OT	Decision	Location	Attendance	Record	Pts	Recap
80	April 1	Chicago		Nashville			Bridgestone Arena
81	April 3	Calgary		Nashville			Bridgestone Arena
82	April 6	Seattle		Nashville			Bridgestone Arena
83	April 8	Nashville		Chicago			United Center
84	April 10	Dallas		Nashville			Bridgestone Arena

Legend: Win Loss Overtime/shootout loss

== Roster ==
Updated November 1, 2026

No.	Nat	Player	Pos	S/G	Age	Acquired	Birthplace
29	(Finland)	Justus Annunen	G	L	26	2024	Kempele, Finland
22	(Canada)	Mavrik Bourque	RW	R	24	2026	Plessisville, Quebec
79	(United States)	Ross Colton	C	L	30	2026	Robbinsville, New Jersey
18	(United States)	Jack Drury (A)	C	L	26	2026	New York, New York
84	(Sweden)	Adam Edström	C	L	26	2026	Karlstad, Sweden
9	(Sweden)	Filip Forsberg (A)	LW	R	32	2013	Östervåla, Sweden
41	(Canada)	Nicolas Hague	D	L	27	2025	Kitchener, Ontario
21	(Sweden)	Nils Höglander	LW	L	25	2026	Bockträsk, Sweden
52	(Canada)	Daemon Hunt	D	L	24	2026	Brandon, Manitoba
59	(Switzerland)	Roman Josi (C)	D	L	36	2008	Bern, Switzerland
14	(Canada)	Alexander Kerfoot	C	L	32	2026	Vancouver, British Columbia
46	(Russia)	Ilya Lyubushkin	D	R	32	2026	Moscow, Russia
81	(Canada)	Jonathan Marchessault	C	R	35	2024	Cap-Rouge, Quebec
90	(Canada)	Ryan O'Reilly (A)	C	L	35	2023	Clinton, Ontario
48	(United States)	Nick Perbix	D	R	28	2025	Elk River, Minnesota
51	(Belarus)	Vitali Pinchuk	C	L	24	2026	Zhlobin, Belarus
74	(Finland)	Juuse Saros	G	L	31	2013	Forssa, Finland
49	(Canada)	Reid Schaefer	LW	L	23	2023	Edmonton, Alberta
76	(United States)	Brady Skjei	D	L	32	2024	Lakeville, Minnesota
91	(Canada)	Steven Stamkos (A)	C	R	36	2024	Markham, Ontario
3	(United States)	Jayden Struble	D	L	25	2026	Cumberland, Rhode Island
85	(Canada)	William Trudeau	D	L	24	2026	Varennes, Quebec
2	(Sweden)	Adam Wilsby	D	L	26	2020	Stockholm, Sweden
15	(Canada)	Shane Wright	C	R	22	2026	Burlington, Ontario

== Player statistics ==
Updated to games played November 21, 2026

=== Skaters ===
Regular season
Player	GP	G	A	Pts	+/-	PIM
Filip Forsberg	23	9	16	25	+9	8
Steven Stamkos	23	12	12	24	-7	10
Roman Josi	23	2	21	23	0	12
Ryan O'Reilly	23	9	12	21	-10	12
Nils Höglander	23	5	5	10	+9	6
Adam Wilsby	23	1	8	9	+1	8
Ross Colton	23	5	3	8	-3	6
Jonathan Marchessault	16	4	4	8	-5	4
Brady Skjei	23	0	8	8	-6	2
Adam Edstrom	23	6	1	7	0	19
Alexander Kerfoot	23	2	5	7	-2	8
Jayden Struble^{†}	19	4	2	6	0	7
Jack Drury	23	2	3	5	-5	8
Nick Perbix	22	2	3	5	-5	10
Mavrik Bourque	19	0	5	5	-9	2
Reid Schaefer	16	2	2	4	+3	4
Nicolas Hague	15	1	3	4	-4	19
Shane Wright^{†}	9	1	2	3	+5	4
Matthew Wood^{‡}	14	1	2	3	-2	4
Vitali Pinchuk	12	1	1	2	-1	4
Daemon Hunt	11	0	1	1	+3	0
Jack Ahcan	3	0	1	1	-1	0
William Trudeau	3	0	0	0	0	0
Ryan Ufko	1	0	0	0	-1	0
Ilya Lyubushkin	1	0	0	0	-2	0

=== Goaltenders ===
Updated to games played November 21, 2026

Regular season
Player	GP	GS	TOI	W	L	OT	GA	GAA	SA	SV%	SO	G	A	PIM
Juuse Saros	17	16	1,009:27	8	4	4	42	2.50	501	.916	0	0	0	0
Justus Annunen	7	6	332:01	4	2	0	22	3.98	162	.864	0	0	0	0
Matt Murray	1	0	64:57	0	0	1	8	1.85	20	.900	0	0	0	0

^{†}Denotes player spent time with another team before joining the Predators. Stats reflect time with the Predators only.
^{‡}Denotes player was traded mid-season. Stats reflect time with the Predators only.
Bold/italics denotes franchise record.

== Transactions ==
The Predators have been involved in the following transactions during the 2026–27 season.

Key:

† Entry-Level Contract
‡ Contract initially takes effect in the 2027–28 season

=== Trades ===
Date	Details		Ref
July 1, 2026	To Dallas Stars 2nd-round pick in 2027; VGK 3rd-round pick in 2028	To Nashville Predators Mavrik Bourque; Ilya Lyubushkin	
September 1, 2026	To New Jersey Devils Luke Evangelista	To Nashville Predators 1st-round pick in 2028; 2nd-round pick in 2028	
October 9, 2026	To Montreal Canadiens 2nd-round pick in 2027	To Nashville Predators Jayden Struble	
November 1, 2026	To Seattle Kraken Matthew Wood	To Nashville Predators Shane Wright	

=== Players acquired ===
Date	Player	Former team	Term	Via	Ref
July 1, 2026	Alexander Kerfoot	Utah Mammoth	2-year	Free agency	
July 1, 2026	Jack Ahcan	Colorado Avalanche	2-year	Free agency	
July 1, 2026	Hunter Skinner	St. Louis Blues	1-year	Free agency	
September 26, 2026	William Trudeau	New York Rangers		Waivers	

=== Players lost ===
Date	Player	New team	Term	Via	Ref
July 1, 2026	Erik Haula	Los Angeles Kings	2-year	Free agency	
July 1, 2026	Andreas Englund	Calgary Flames	1-year	Free agency	
July 13, 2026	Jordan Oesterle	—N/a		Retirement	

=== Signings ===
Date	Player	Term	Ref
July 3, 2026	Chase Bradley	2-year	
July 4, 2026	Mavrik Bourque	6-year	
July 5, 2026	Justin Barron	1-year	

== Draft picks ==
Below are the Nashville Predators' selections at the 2026 NHL entry draft, which was held on June 26 and 27, 2026, at the KeyBank Center in Buffalo, New York.

Round	#	Player	Pos	Nationality	College/Junior/Club (League)
1	10	Wyatt Cullen	LW	United States	U.S. National Development Team
1	31 (Note: The Carolina Hurricanes' first-round pick went to the Nashville Predators as the result of a trade on June 26, 2026 that sent two second-round picks in 2026 (42nd and 57th overall) to Carolina in exchange for this pick.)	Tommy Bleyl	D	United States	Moncton Wildcats (QMJHL)
3	70 (Note: The Seattle Kraken's third-round pick went to the Nashville Predators as the result of a trade on March 5, 2026, that sent Michael Bunting to Dallas in exchange for this pick.)	Dmitri Borichev	G	Russia	Lokomotiv Yaroslavl (KHL)
4	106	Jakub Floris	D	Slovakia	Lukko (Liiga)
4	118 (Note: The Pittsburgh Penguins' fourth-round pick went to the Nashville Predators as the result of a trade on March 5, 2025, that sent Tommy Novak and Luke Schenn to Pittsburgh in exchange for Michael Bunting and this pick.)	Justin Graf	LW	United States	Cedar Rapids RoughRiders (USHL)
5	138	Philip Hemmyr	LW	Sweden	IF Björklöven (SHL)
6	179 (Note: The Utah Mammoth's sixth-round pick went to the Nashville Predators as the result of a trade on June 28, 2025, that sent Colorado's sixth-round pick in 2025 to Utah in exchange for this pick.)	Benjamin Cossette-Ayotte	D	Canada	Val-d'Or Foreurs (QMJHL)
7	202	Charlie Puglisi	C	United States	Islanders Hockey Club (USPHL)
