= 2026–27 San Jose Sharks season =

National Hockey League team season

2026–27 San Jose Sharks
- Division: Pacific
- Conference: Western
- 2026–27 record: 11–12–2
- Home record: 6–6–1
- Road record: 5–6–1
- Goals for: 69
- Goals against: 89

Team information
- General manager: Mike Grier
- Coach: Ryan Warsofsky
- Captain: Macklin Celebrini
- Alternate captains: Barclay Goodrow; Darnell Nurse; Tyler Toffoli; Alexander Wennberg
- Arena: SAP Center
- Average attendance: 15,700
- Minor league affiliates: San Jose Barracuda (AHL); Wichita Thunder (ECHL)

Team leaders
- Goals: Macklin Celebrini (10)
- Assists: Macklin Celebrini (19)
- Points: Macklin Celebrini (29)
- Penalty minutes: Zack Ostapchuk (30)
- Plus/minus: Eric Pohlkamp (+3)
- Wins: Yaroslav Askarov (6)
- Goals against average: Alex Nedeljkovic (3.07)

The 2026–27 San Jose Sharks season is the 36th season for the National Hockey League franchise that was established on May 9, 1990.

== Standings ==
=== Divisional standings ===
Pacific Division
Pos	Team	GP	W	L	OTL	RW	GF	GA	GD	Pts
1	Edmonton Oilers	25	17	5	3	14	97	72	+25	37
2	Vegas Golden Knights	25	14	6	5	11	85	75	+10	33
3	San Jose Sharks	25	11	12	2	4	69	89	−20	24
4	Anaheim Ducks	24	11	12	1	10	87	92	−5	23
5	Calgary Flames	24	10	12	2	9	60	84	−24	22
6	Seattle Kraken	20	10	9	1	7	67	71	−4	21
7	Los Angeles Kings	21	7	12	2	4	58	70	−12	16
8	Vancouver Canucks	25	6	18	1	3	71	108	−37	13

Updated to game(s) played on November 21, 2026. Source: National Hockey League
Rules for classification: 1) Fewer number of games played (GP, only during regular season); 2) Greater number of regulation wins (RW); 3) Greater number of wins in regulation and overtime, excluding shootout wins (ROW); 4) Greater number of total wins, including shootouts (W); 5) Greater number of points earned in head-to-head play; if teams played an uneven number of head-to-head games, the result of the first game on the home ice of the team with the extra home game is discarded; 6) Greater goal differential (GD); 7) Greater number of goals scored (GF)

=== Conference standings ===
Western Conference Wild Card
Pos	Div	Team	GP	W	L	OTL	RW	GF	GA	GD	Pts
1	CE	Nashville Predators	23	12	6	5	9	71	69	+2	29
2	CE	Utah Mammoth	24	12	9	3	10	80	81	−1	27
3	CE	St. Louis Blues	23	12	9	2	11	77	73	+4	26
4	CE	Winnipeg Jets	24	11	9	4	8	75	82	−7	26
5	PA	Anaheim Ducks	24	11	12	1	10	87	92	−5	23
6	PA	Calgary Flames	24	10	12	2	9	60	84	−24	22
7	PA	Seattle Kraken	20	10	9	1	7	67	71	−4	21
8	PA	Los Angeles Kings	21	7	12	2	4	58	70	−12	16
9	CE	Chicago Blackhawks	23	7	14	2	4	58	93	−35	16
10	PA	Vancouver Canucks	25	6	18	1	3	71	108	−37	13

Updated to game(s) played on November 21, 2026. Source: National Hockey League
Rules for classification: 1) Fewer number of games played (GP, only during regular season); 2) Greater number of regulation wins (RW); 3) Greater number of wins in regulation and overtime, excluding shootout wins (ROW); 4) Greater number of total wins, including shootouts (W); 5) Greater number of points earned in head-to-head play; if teams played an uneven number of head-to-head games, the result of the first game on the home ice of the team with the extra home game is discarded; 6) Greater goal differential (GD); 7) Greater number of goals scored (GF)

== Schedule ==
=== Preseason ===
The preseason schedule was announced on June 22, 2026.

Preseason game log

2026 preseason game log: 2–1–1 (home: 1–0–1; away: 1–1–0)
#	Date	Visitor	Score	Home	OT	Decision	Attendance	Record	Recap
1	September 20	San Jose	2–6	Anaheim		Comrie	10,000	0–1–0	Recap
2	September 22	Vegas	2–1	San Jose	SO	Askarov	11,573	0–1–1	Recap
3	September 24	Anaheim	0–10	San Jose		Nedeljkovic	11,678	1–1–1	Recap
4	September 26	San Jose	4–2	Vegas		Askarov	17,264	2–1–1	Recap

Legend: Win Loss Overtime/shootout loss

=== Regular season ===
The schedule was announced on July 16, 2026.

2026–27 game log: 11–12–2 (home: 6–6–1; away: 5–6–1)

October: 7–7–1 (home: 3–4–0; away: 4–3–1)
#	Date	Visitor	Score	Home	OT	Decision	Attendance	Record	Pts	Recap
1	October 1	Florida	3–4	San Jose	OT	Askarov	17,435	1–0–0	2	Recap
2	October 3	Los Angeles	4–5	San Jose	OT	Askarov	17,435	2–0–0	4	Recap
3	October 5	San Jose	0–5	Dallas		Askarov	18,532	2–1–0	4	Recap
4	October 8	San Jose	3–2	St. Louis	OT	Nedeljkovic	18,096	3–1–0	6	Recap
5	October 10	Edmonton	3–1	San Jose		Askarov	17,435	3–2–0	6	Recap
6	October 13	Boston	6–3	San Jose		Askarov	14,748	3–3–0	6	Recap
7	October 15	San Jose	3–2	Nashville	SO	Nedeljkovic	17,181	4–3–0	8	Recap
8	October 17	San Jose	3–4	Detroit	SO	Nedeljkovic	17,979	4–3–1	9	Recap
9	October 19	San Jose	1–3	Toronto		Askarov	19,011	4–4–1	9	Recap
10	October 20	San Jose	4–3	Montreal	OT	Nedeljkovic	20,962	5–4–1	11	Recap
11	October 22	San Jose	6–2	Ottawa		Askarov	15,469	6–4–1	13	Recap
12	October 24	San Jose	4–6	Boston		Nedeljkovic	17,850	6–5–1	13	Recap
13	October 27	Buffalo	2–0	San Jose		Askarov	14,900	6–6–1	13	Recap
14	October 29	Vancouver	2–3	San Jose		Askarov	15,442	7–6–1	15	Recap
15	October 31	Ottawa	5–1	San Jose		Nedeljkovic	16,138	7–7–1	15	Recap

November: 4–5–1 (home: 3–2–1; away: 1–3–0)
#	Date	Visitor	Score	Home	OT	Decision	Attendance	Record	Pts	Recap
16	November 2	Calgary	2–1	San Jose		Askarov	13,098	7–8–1	15	Recap
17	November 4	San Jose	2–7	Los Angeles		Askarov	17,010	7–9–1	15	Recap
18	November 6	San Jose	1–4	Minnesota		Askarov	19,009	7–10–1	15	Recap
19	November 7	San Jose	3–4	Dallas		Nedeljkovic	18,532	7–11–1	15	Recap
20	November 9	NY Islanders	2–3	San Jose	SO	Askarov	13,769	8–11–1	17	Recap
21	November 11	Pittsburgh	3–2	San Jose	SO	Askarov	17,435	8–11–2	18	Recap
22	November 14	San Jose	6–5	Utah	SO	Askarov	14,111	9–11–2	20	Recap
23	November 15	Nashville	2–4	San Jose		Nedeljkovic	14,949	10–11–2	22	Recap
24	November 17	Calgary	5–2	San Jose		Askarov	13,876	10–12–2	22	Recap
25	November 21	Seattle	3–4	San Jose		Nedeljkovic	17,435	11–12–2	24	Recap
26	November 23	Minnesota		San Jose
27	November 25	San Jose		Anaheim
28	November 27	Vegas		San Jose
29	November 28	San Jose		Colorado

December: 0–0–0 (home: 0–0–0; away: 0–0–0)
#	Date	Visitor	Score	Home	OT	Decision	Attendance	Record	Pts	Recap
30	December 1	San Jose		New Jersey
31	December 3	San Jose		NY Rangers
32	December 4	San Jose		NY Islanders
33	December 6	San Jose		Pittsburgh
34	December 8	Seattle		San Jose
35	December 9	San Jose		Los Angeles
36	December 11	Los Angeles		San Jose
37	December 14	Vancouver		San Jose
38	December 16	San Jose		Vegas
39	December 19	San Jose		Vancouver
40	December 22	San Jose		Seattle
41	December 26	Vegas		San Jose
42	December 28	San Jose		Winnipeg
43	December 29	San Jose		Calgary

January: 0–0–0 (home: 0–0–0; away: 0–0–0)
#	Date	Visitor	Score	Home	OT	Decision	Attendance	Record	Pts	Recap
44	January 1	Philadelphia		San Jose
45	January 2	Toronto		San Jose
46	January 4	New Jersey		San Jose
47	January 6	Dallas		San Jose
48	January 8	Washington		San Jose
49	January 9	NY Rangers		San Jose
50	January 13	San Jose		Edmonton
51	January 14	San Jose		Calgary
52	January 16	San Jose		Seattle
53	January 18	Utah		San Jose
54	January 23	Edmonton		San Jose
55	January 28	Nashville		San Jose
56	January 30	Chicago		San Jose

February: 0–0–0 (home: 0–0–0; away: 0–0–0)
#	Date	Visitor	Score	Home	OT	Decision	Attendance	Record	Pts	Recap
57	February 10	Chicago		San Jose
58	February 13	Detroit		San Jose
59	February 15	Winnipeg		San Jose
60	February 19	San Jose		Washington
61	February 21	San Jose		Florida
62	February 23	San Jose		Tampa Bay
63	February 25	San Jose		Carolina
64	February 27	San Jose		Philadelphia

March: 0–0–0 (home: 0–0–0; away: 0–0–0)
#	Date	Visitor	Score	Home	OT	Decision	Attendance	Record	Pts	Recap
65	March 1	Montreal		San Jose
66	March 3	Columbus		San Jose
67	March 5	Colorado		San Jose
68	March 6	Tampa Bay		San Jose
69	March 9	San Jose		Vegas
70	March 11	San Jose		St. Louis
71	March 13	San Jose		Colombus
72	March 15	San Jose		Buffalo
73	March 16	San Jose		Chicago
74	March 18	San Jose		Winnipeg
75	March 20	Carolina		San Jose
76	March 22	San Jose		Anaheim
77	March 24	Anaheim		San Jose
78	March 26	San Jose		Utah
79	March 29	Colorado		San Jose
80	March 31	San Jose		Edmonton

April: 0–0–0 (home: 0–0–0; away: 0–0–0)
#	Date	Visitor	Score	Home	OT	Decision	Attendance	Record	Pts	Recap
81	April 3	San Jose		Vancouver
82	April 4	St. Louis		San Jose
83	April 8	Minnesota		San Jose
84	April 10	Anaheim		San Jose

Legend: Win Loss Overtime/shootout loss

== Roster ==
Updated November 22, 2026

No.	Nat	Player	Pos	S/G	Age	Acquired	Birthplace
5	(Canada)	Nolan Allan	D	L	23	2026	Davidson, Saskatchewan
30	(Russia)	Yaroslav Askarov	G	R	24	2024	Omsk, Russia
71	(Canada)	Macklin Celebrini (C)	C	L	20	2024	North Vancouver, British Columbia
92	(Russia)	Igor Chernyshov	LW	R	20	2024	Penza, Russia
39	(Canada)	Logan Couture	C	L	37	2007	Guelph, Ontario
10	(Canada)	Ty Dellandrea	C	R	26	2024	Port Perry, Ontario
6	(Canada)	Sam Dickinson	D	L	20	2024	Toronto, Ontario
81	(United States)	Adam Gaudette	RW	R	30	2025	Braintree, Massachusetts
23	(Canada)	Barclay Goodrow (A)	C	L	33	2024	Toronto, Ontario
51	(United States)	Collin Graf	RW	R	24	2024	Lincoln, Massachusetts
7	(United States)	Michael Kesselring	D	R	26	2026	Florence, South Carolina
17	(Canada)	Brett Leason	RW	R	27	2026	Calgary, Alberta
27	(Canada)	Mason Marchment	LW	L	31	2026	Uxbridge, Ontario
77	(Canada)	Michael Misa	C	L	19	2025	Oakville, Ontario
33	(United States)	Alex Nedeljkovic	G	L	30	2025	Parma, Ohio
25	(Canada)	Darnell Nurse (A)	D	L	31	2026	Hamilton, Ontario
9	(Russia)	Dmitry Orlov	D	L	35	2025	Novokuznetsk, Soviet Union
63	(Canada)	Zack Ostapchuk	C	L	23	2025	Edmonton, Alberta
48	(United States)	Eric Pohlkamp	D	R	22	2023	Baxter, Minnesota
44	(United States)	Kiefer Sherwood	LW	R	31	2026	Columbus, Ohio
2	(United States)	Will Smith	C	R	21	2023	Lexington, Massachusetts
41	(Sweden)	Ivar Stenberg	LW	R	19	2026	Gothenburg, Sweden
73	(Canada)	Tyler Toffoli (A)	C	R	34	2024	Scarborough, Ontario
65	(United States)	Jacob Trouba	D	R	32	2026	Rochester, Michigan
21	(Sweden)	Alexander Wennberg (A)	C	L	32	2024	Nacka, Sweden

== Player statistics ==
Updated to games played November 21, 2026

=== Skaters ===
Regular season
Player	GP	G	A	Pts	+/-	PIM
Macklin Celebrini	23	10	19	29	-3	20
Will Smith	25	8	11	19	-9	8
Dmitry Orlov	25	3	14	17	-12	8
Ivar Stenberg	25	8	8	16	-11	8
Tyler Toffoli	25	6	8	14	-4	4
Michael Misa	25	5	9	14	-4	8
Mason Marchment	25	6	6	12	-11	22
Jacob Trouba	25	2	9	11	-7	27
Kiefer Sherwood	23	2	6	8	-7	18
Collin Graf	24	3	2	5	-5	9
Nolan Allan	11	3	1	4	0	8
Igor Chernyshov	11	2	2	4	+1	2
Sam Dickinson	23	1	3	4	-5	10
Michael Kesselring	24	0	4	4	-8	13
Eric Pohlkamp	9	1	2	3	+3	0
Darnell Nurse	24	1	2	3	-3	15
Alexander Wennberg	13	0	3	3	-4	4
Adam Gaudette	10	2	0	2	-1	9
Zack Ostapchuk	23	2	0	2	-2	30
Luca Cagnoni	9	1	1	2	-3	4
Ty Dellandrea	17	0	2	2	-6	20
Barclay Goodrow	25	0	1	1	-2	22
Brett Leason	1	0	0	0	0	2
Filip Bystedt	5	0	0	0	-3	2

=== Goaltenders ===
Updated to games played November 21, 2026

Regular season
Player	GP	GS	TOI	W	L	OT	GA	GAA	SA	SV%	SO	G	A	Pts	PIM
Alex Nedeljkovic	9	9	547:32	5	3	1	28	3.07	285	.902	0	0	0	0	2
Yaroslav Askarov	16	16	967:47	6	9	1	53	3.29	475	.888	0	0	0	0	0

^{†}Denotes player spent time with another team before joining the Sharks. Stats reflect time with the Sharks only.
^{‡}Denotes player was traded mid-season. Stats reflect time with the Sharks only.
Bold/italics denotes franchise record.

== Transactions ==
The Sharks have been involved in the following transactions during the 2026–27 season.

Key:

† Entry-Level Contract
‡ Contract initially takes effect in the 2027–28 season

=== Trades ===
Date	Details		Ref
July 1, 2026	To Edmonton Oilers Shakir Mukhamadullin; Zack Sharp	To San Jose Sharks Darnell Nurse	

=== Players acquired ===
Date	Player	Former team	Term	Via	Ref
July 1, 2026	Eric Comrie	Winnipeg Jets	2-year	Free agency	
July 1, 2026	Mason Marchment	Columbus Blue Jackets	5-year	Free agency	
July 1, 2026	Jacob Trouba	Anaheim Ducks	4-year	Free agency	
July 2, 2026	Alex Barré-Boulet	Colorado Eagles (AHL)	2-year	Free agency	
July 2, 2026	Tye Felhaber	Colorado Eagles (AHL)	1-year	Free agency	
July 2, 2026	Kyle Keyser	Utah Grizzlies (ECHL)	1-year	Free agency	
July 2, 2026	Brett Leason	Hershey Bears (AHL)	1-year	Free agency	

=== Players lost ===
Date	Player	New team	Term	Via	Ref
July 1, 2026	Laurent Brossoit	Anaheim Ducks	1-year	Free agency	
July 1, 2026	Vincent Desharnais	Washington Capitals	4-year	Free agency	
July 1, 2026	Mario Ferraro	Winnipeg Jets	3-year	Free agency	
July 1, 2026	Jett Woo	Anaheim Ducks	2-year	Free agency	
September 11, 2026	John Klingberg	—N/a		Retirement	
September 16, 2026	Ryan Reaves	—N/a		Retirement	
September 17, 2026	Pavol Regenda	HV71 (SHL)	1-year	Free agency	
October 17, 2026	Philipp Kurashev	Lausanne HC (NL)	1-year	Free agency	

=== Signings ===
Date	Player	Term	Ref
June 27, 2026	Zack Ostapchuk	4-year	
June 28, 2026	Michael Kesselring	3-year	
July 1, 2026	Andre Gasseau	2-year	
July 2, 2026	Ivar Stenberg	3-year†	
July 8, 2026	Libor Hájek	1-year	
July 29, 2026	Macklin Celebrini	5-year‡	
July 31, 2026	Collin Graf	3-year	
September 8, 2026	Ilya Samsonov	1-year	

== Draft picks ==
Below are the San Jose Sharks' selections at the 2026 NHL entry draft, which will be held on June 26 and 27, 2026, at the KeyBank Center in Buffalo, New York.

Round	#	Player	Pos	Nationality	College/Junior/Club (League)
1	2	Ivar Stenberg	LW	Sweden	Frölunda HC (SHL)
1	9 (Note: The Florida Panthers' first round pick went to the San Jose Sharks as the result of a trade on June 23, 2026 that sent William Eklund, Kasper Halttunen, and Brandon Svoboda to Ottawa in exchange for this pick. Ottawa previously acquired this pick as the result of a trade on June 21, 2026 that sent Brady Tkachuk to Florida in exchange for the Tampa Bay Lightning's first round pick in 2026, a conditional first-round pick in 2029, a second-round pick in 2027 and this pick.)	Keaton Verhoeff	D	Canada	North Dakota Fighting Hawks (NCHC)
1	21 (Note: The Philadelphia Flyers first-round pick went to the San Jose Sharks as the result of the trade on June 26, 2026 that sent a first-round pick in 2026 (27th overall), second-round pick in 2026 (62nd overall) and fourth-round pick in 2026 (120th overall) to Philadelphia in exchange for this pick.)	Ryan Lin	D	Canada	Vancouver Giants (WHL)
4	127 (Note: The Vegas Golden Knights' fourth-round pick will go to the San Jose Sharks as the result of a trade on March 6, 2026, that sent Timothy Liljegren to Washington in exchange for this pick.)	Brady Knowling	G	Canada	Saginaw Spirit (OHL)
6	174 (Note: The Columbus Blue Jackets' sixth-round pick will go to the San Jose Sharks as the result of a trade on October 5, 2025, that sent Carl Grundström and Artem Guryev to Philadelphia in exchange for Ryan Ellis and this pick (being conditional at the time of the trade). The condition – San Jose will receive the earlier of Columbus or Philadelphia's sixth-round picks in 2026 – was converted on April 13, 2026, when Philadelphia qualified for the 2026 Stanley Cup playoffs after Columbus had already been eliminated from playoff contention.)	Jake Gustafson	C	United States	Portland Winterhawks (WHL)
7	201	Alexander Karmanov	D	Moldova	North Bay Battalion (OHL)
