= 2026–27 Vancouver Canucks season =

National Hockey League season

2026–27 Vancouver Canucks
- Division: Pacific
- Conference: Western
- 2026–27 record: 6–18–1
- Home record: 2–9–0
- Road record: 4–9–1
- Goals for: 71
- Goals against: 108

Team information
- General manager: Ryan Johnson
- Coach: Manny Malhotra
- Captain: Vacant
- Alternate captains: Brock Boeser; Zeev Buium; Filip Hronek; Linus Karlsson; Drew O'Connor; Elias Pettersson
- Arena: Rogers Arena
- Minor league affiliates: Abbotsford Canucks (AHL); Kalamazoo Wings (ECHL)

Team leaders
- Goals: Brock Boeser (8)
- Assists: Brock Boeser (19)
- Points: Brock Boeser (27)
- Penalty minutes: Drew O'Connor (34)
- Plus/minus: Linus Karlsson (+1)
- Wins: Leevi Meriläinen (4)
- Goals against average: Nikita Tolopilo (2.00)

The 2026–27 Vancouver Canucks season is the 57th season (56th season of play) for the National Hockey League (NHL) franchise that was established on May 22, 1970.

== Standings ==
=== Divisional standings ===
Pacific Division
Pos	Team	GP	W	L	OTL	RW	GF	GA	GD	Pts
1	Edmonton Oilers	25	17	5	3	14	97	72	+25	37
2	Vegas Golden Knights	25	14	6	5	11	85	75	+10	33
3	San Jose Sharks	25	11	12	2	4	69	89	−20	24
4	Anaheim Ducks	24	11	12	1	10	87	92	−5	23
5	Calgary Flames	24	10	12	2	9	60	84	−24	22
6	Seattle Kraken	20	10	9	1	7	67	71	−4	21
7	Los Angeles Kings	21	7	12	2	4	58	70	−12	16
8	Vancouver Canucks	25	6	18	1	3	71	108	−37	13

Updated to game(s) played on November 21, 2026. Source: National Hockey League
Rules for classification: 1) Fewer number of games played (GP, only during regular season); 2) Greater number of regulation wins (RW); 3) Greater number of wins in regulation and overtime, excluding shootout wins (ROW); 4) Greater number of total wins, including shootouts (W); 5) Greater number of points earned in head-to-head play; if teams played an uneven number of head-to-head games, the result of the first game on the home ice of the team with the extra home game is discarded; 6) Greater goal differential (GD); 7) Greater number of goals scored (GF)

=== Conference standings ===
Western Conference Wild Card
Pos	Div	Team	GP	W	L	OTL	RW	GF	GA	GD	Pts
1	CE	Nashville Predators	23	12	6	5	9	71	69	+2	29
2	CE	Utah Mammoth	24	12	9	3	10	80	81	−1	27
3	CE	St. Louis Blues	23	12	9	2	11	77	73	+4	26
4	CE	Winnipeg Jets	24	11	9	4	8	75	82	−7	26
5	PA	Anaheim Ducks	24	11	12	1	10	87	92	−5	23
6	PA	Calgary Flames	24	10	12	2	9	60	84	−24	22
7	PA	Seattle Kraken	20	10	9	1	7	67	71	−4	21
8	PA	Los Angeles Kings	21	7	12	2	4	58	70	−12	16
9	CE	Chicago Blackhawks	23	7	14	2	4	58	93	−35	16
10	PA	Vancouver Canucks	25	6	18	1	3	71	108	−37	13

Updated to game(s) played on November 21, 2026. Source: National Hockey League
Rules for classification: 1) Fewer number of games played (GP, only during regular season); 2) Greater number of regulation wins (RW); 3) Greater number of wins in regulation and overtime, excluding shootout wins (ROW); 4) Greater number of total wins, including shootouts (W); 5) Greater number of points earned in head-to-head play; if teams played an uneven number of head-to-head games, the result of the first game on the home ice of the team with the extra home game is discarded; 6) Greater goal differential (GD); 7) Greater number of goals scored (GF)

== Schedule and results ==
=== Preseason ===
The preseason schedule was released on June 30, 2026.

2026 preseason game log: 1–3–0 (home: 1–1–0; road: 0–2–0)
#	Date	Visitor	Score	Home	OT	Location	Decision	Attendance	Record	Recap
1	September 19	Vancouver	2–4	Seattle		Climate Pledge Arena	Tolopilo	17,151	0–1–0
2	September 22	Vancouver	1–3	Calgary		Scotiabank Saddledome	Lankinen	15,883	0–2–0
3	September 24	Edmonton	2–1	Vancouver		Rogers Arena	Tolopilo	15,880	0–3–0
4	September 26	Seattle	3–4	Vancouver		Rogers Arena	Lankinen	17,237	1–3–0

=== Regular season ===
2026–27 game log

September/October: 3–12–1 (Home: 1–6–0; Road: 2–6–1)
#	Date	Visitor	Score	Home	OT	Decision	Attendance	Record	Pts	Recap
1	September 29	Vancouver	6–5	Edmonton	OT	Lankinen	18,347	1–0–0	2
2	October 1	Edmonton	9–7	Vancouver		Lankinen	18,677	1–1–0	2
3	October 3	Calgary	1–4	Vancouver		Merilainen	16,591	2–1–0	4
4	October 4	Vegas	3–2	Vancouver		Lankinen	17,227	2–2–0	4
5	October 8	Vancouver	2–7	Carolina		Lankinen	18,800	2–3–0	4
6	October 10	Vancouver	1–4	New Jersey		Lankinen	15,929	2–4–0	4
7	October 11	Vancouver	2–6	NY Rangers		Lankinen	18,006	2–5–0	4
8	October 13	Vancouver	2–3	NY Islanders		Merilainen	13,647	2–6–0	4
9	October 15	Vancouver	2–3	Florida	OT	Merilainen	18,900	2–6–1	5
10	October 17	Vancouver	2–4	Tampa Bay		Lankinen	19,092	2–7–1	5
11	October 20	Carolina	6–3	Vancouver		Merilainen	17,250	2–8–1	5
12	October 22	Detroit	5–2	Vancouver		Lankinen	17,523	2–9–1	5
13	October 25	Minnesota	4–2	Vancouver		Merilainen	17,560	2–10–1	5
14	October 27	Vancouver	6–5	Anaheim	OT	Merilainen	14,000	3–10–1	7
15	October 29	Vancouver	2–3	San Jose		Merilainen	15,442	3–11–1	7
16	October 31	Toronto	4–2	Vancouver		Merilainen	17,867	3–12–1	7

November: 3–6–0 (Home: 1–3–0; Road: 2–3–0)
#	Date	Visitor	Score	Home	OT	Decision	Attendance	Record	Pts	Recap
17	November 3	Anaheim	5–4	Vancouver		Lankinen	17,100	3–13–1	7
18	November 5	Vancouver	2–6	Winnipeg		Merilainen	13,312	3–14–1	7
19	November 7	Vancouver	2–4	Edmonton		Merilainen	17,555	3–15–1	7
20	November 9	Philadelphia	3–1	Vancouver		Merilainen	17,119	3–16–1	7
21	November 13	NY Rangers	5–1	Vancouver		Merilainen	17,156	3–17–1	7
22	November 15	Vancouver	6–3	Vegas		Merilainen	16,336	4–17–1	9
23	November 16	Vancouver	3–2	Utah		Tolopilo	14,111	5–17–1	11
24	November 19	Vancouver	1–5	Seattle		Merilainen	17,151	5–18–1	11
25	November 21	Minnesota	3–4	Vancouver	SO	Merilainen	17,145	6–18–1	13
26	November 22	Chicago	–	Vancouver
27	November 25	Vancouver	–	Detroit
28	November 27	Vancouver	–	Philadelphia
29	November 29	Vancouver	–	Boston

December: 0–0–0 (Home: 0–0–0; Road: 0–0–0)
#	Date	Visitor	Score	Home	OT	Decision	Attendance	Record	Pts	Recap
30	December 1	Vancouver	–	Washington
31	December 4	Buffalo	–	Vancouver
32	December 5	Dallas	–	Vancouver
33	December 7	Washington	–	Vancouver
34	December 10	Nashville	–	Vancouver
35	December 12	Vancouver	–	Los Angeles
36	December 14	Vancouver	–	San Jose
37	December 16	Vancouver	–	Anaheim
38	December 19	San Jose	–	Vancouver
39	December 21	Utah	–	Vancouver
40	December 26	Vancouver	–	Calgary
41	December 28	Los Angeles	–	Vancouver
42	December 30	Seattle	–	Vancouver

January: 0–0–0 (Home: 0–0–0; Road: 0–0–0)
#	Date	Visitor	Score	Home	OT	Decision	Attendance	Record	Pts	Recap
43	January 2	Vancouver	–	Utah
44	January 3	Vancouver	–	Seattle
45	January 5	NY Islanders	–	Vancouver
46	January 7	Tampa Bay	–	Vancouver
47	January 9	Florida	–	Vancouver
48	January 14	Seattle	–	Vancouver
49	January 16	Columbus	–	Vancouver
50	January 18	Vancouver	–	Colorado
51	January 20	Vancouver	–	Nashville
52	January 22	Vancouver	–	Chicago
53	January 23	Vancouver	–	Pittsburgh
54	January 26	Vancouver	–	Minnesota
55	January 28	Vancouver	–	Dallas
56	January 30	Vancouver	–	St. Louis

February: 0–0–0 (Home: 0–0–0; Road: 0–0–0)
#	Date	Visitor	Score	Home	OT	Decision	Attendance	Record	Pts	Recap
57	February 1	Montreal	–	Vancouver
58	February 3	New Jersey	–	Vancouver
59	February 13	Winnipeg	–	Vancouver
60	February 16	Pittsburgh	–	Vancouver
61	February 18	Ottawa	–	Vancouver
62	February 20	Colorado	–	Vancouver
63	February 21	Boston	–	Vancouver
64	February 23	Vancouver	–	Dallas
65	February 25	Vancouver	–	St. Louis
66	February 27	Calgary	–	Vancouver

March: 0–0–0 (Home: 0–0–0; Road: 0–0–0)
#	Date	Visitor	Score	Home	OT	Decision	Attendance	Record	Pts	Recap
67	March 3	Chicago	–	Vancouver
68	March 6	Vancouver	–	Montreal
69	March 9	Vancouver	–	Buffalo
70	March 11	Vancouver	–	Columbus
71	March 13	Vancouver	–	Toronto
72	March 14	Vancouver	–	Ottawa
73	March 17	Nashville	–	Vancouver
74	March 20	St. Louis	–	Vancouver
75	March 21	Edmonton	–	Vancouver
76	March 23	Los Angeles	–	Vancouver
77	March 25	Vegas	–	Vancouver
78	March 27	Anaheim	–	Vancouver
79	March 29	Vancouver	–	Los Angeles
80	March 31	Vancouver	–	Vegas

April: 0–0–0 (Home: 0–0–0; Road: 0–0–0)
#	Date	Visitor	Score	Home	OT	Decision	Attendance	Record	Pts	Recap
81	April 3	San Jose	–	Vancouver
82	April 6	Colorado	–	Vancouver
83	April 9	Vancouver	–	Winnipeg
84	April 10	Vancouver	–	Calgary

Legend: Win (2 points) Loss (0 points) Overtime/shootout loss (1 point)

== Player statistics ==
Updated to games played November 16, 2026

=== Skaters ===
Regular season
Player	GP	G	A	Pts	+/−	PIM
Brock Boeser	23	8	15	23	−10	10
Elias Pettersson	23	6	17	23	−6	4
Jonathan Lekkerimaki	23	7	11	18	−9	8
Filip Hronek	23	1	13	14	−13	2
Jake DeBrusk	21	6	6	12	−6	4
Linus Karlsson	23	6	6	12	+2	14
Liam Ohgren	22	6	4	10	−5	8
Max Sasson	23	5	3	8	−8	19
Paul Cotter	22	4	4	8	−4	27
Jamie Oleksiak	21	2	6	8	−4	17
Marco Rossi	21	3	4	7	−8	6
Drew O'Connor	23	3	3	6	−9	30
Filip Chytil	10	3	2	5	0	6
Zeev Buium	23	0	5	5	−9	6
Elias Pettersson	23	3	1	4	−3	22
Arshdeep Bains	15	2	2	4	−3	6
Tom Willander	19	0	4	4	0	10
Brendan Gallagher	20	0	3	3	−7	10
Luke Schenn	12	0	2	2	−6	23
Aatu Raty^{‡}	4	1	0	0	−2	2
Jacob Quillan	3	0	1	1	0	12
Guillaume Brisebois	6	0	1	1	−4	2
Cameron Crotty^{†}	3	0	0	0	0	2
Victor Mancini	8	0	0	0	−2	0

=== Goaltenders ===
Regular season
Player	GP	GS	TOI	W	L	OT	GA	GAA	SA	SV%	SO	G	A	PIM
Leevi Merilainen	16	14	877:16	3	9	1	51	3.49	453	.887	0	0	0	0
Nikita Tolopilo	1	1	60:00	1	0	0	2	2.00	37	.946	0	0	0	0
Kevin Lankinen	9	8	427:40	1	8	0	43	6.03	219	.808	0	0	0	0

^{†}Denotes player spent time with another team before joining the Canucks. Stats reflect time with the Canucks only.
^{‡}Denotes player was traded mid-season. Stats reflect time with the Canucks only.

== Roster ==
Updated November 20, 2026

No.	Nat	Player	Pos	S/G	Age	Acquired	Birthplace
13	(Canada)	Arshdeep Bains	LW	L	25	2022	Surrey, British Columbia
6	(United States)	Brock Boeser (A)	RW	R	29	2015	Burnsville, Minnesota
55	(Canada)	Guillaume Brisebois	D	L	29	2015	Longueuil, Quebec
8	(United States)	Zeev Buium (A)	D	L	20	2025	Laguna Niguel, California
77	(Czech Republic)	Filip Chytil	C	L	27	2025	Kroměříž, Czech Republic
47	(United States)	Paul Cotter	C	L	27	2026	Canton, Michigan
51	(Canada)	Cameron Crotty	D	R	27	2026	Ottawa, Ontario
74	(Canada)	Jake DeBrusk	RW	L	30	2024	Edmonton, Alberta
35	(United States)	Thatcher Demko	G	L	30	2014	San Diego, California
7	(Canada)	Brendan Gallagher	RW	R	34	2026	Edmonton, Alberta
17	(Czech Republic)	Filip Hronek (A)	D	R	29	2023	Hradec Králové, Czech Republic
94	(Sweden)	Linus Karlsson (A)	C	R	27	2019	Eksjö, Sweden
32	(Finland)	Kevin Lankinen	G	L	31	2024	Helsinki, Finland
88	(Sweden)	Jonathan Lekkerimäki	RW	R	22	2022	Huddinge, Sweden
31	(Finland)	Leevi Meriläinen	G	L	24	2026	Oulunsalo, Finland
18	(United States)	Drew O'Connor (A)	LW	L	28	2025	Chatham, New Jersey
92	(Sweden)	Liam Öhgren	LW	L	22	2025	Stockholm, Sweden
4	(Canada)	Jamie Oleksiak	D	L	33	2026	Toronto, Ontario
25	(Sweden)	Elias Pettersson	D	L	22	2022	Västerås, Sweden
40	(Sweden)	Elias Pettersson (A)	C	L	28	2017	Sundsvall, Sweden
62	(Canada)	Jacob Quillan	C	L	24	2026	Dartmouth, Nova Scotia
23	(Austria)	Marco Rossi	C	L	25	2025	Feldkirch, Austria
2	(Canada)	Luke Schenn	D	R	37	2026	Saskatoon, Saskatchewan
5	(Sweden)	Tom Willander	D	R	21	2023	Stockholm, Sweden

== Transactions ==
The Canucks have been involved in the following transactions during the 2026–27 season.

Key: † Contract is entry-level.
‡ Contract initially takes effect in the 2027–28 season.

=== Trades ===
Date	Details		Ref
June 27, 2026	To Toronto Maple Leafs 6th-round pick in 2026	To Vancouver Canucks OTT 5th-round pick in 2027	
June 29, 2026	To Nashville Predators Nils Höglander	To Vancouver Canucks COL 3rd-round pick in 2029	
June 29, 2026	To Montreal Canadiens Future considerations	To Vancouver Canucks Brendan Gallagher	
July 1, 2026	To New York Rangers Marcus Pettersson	To Vancouver Canucks conditional 1st-round pick in 2030	
October 15, 2026	To Toronto Maple Leafs Aatu Raty	To Vancouver Canucks Brandon Buhr; Jacob Quillan	

=== Players acquired ===
Date	Player	Former team	Term	Via	Ref
July 1, 2026	Paul Cotter	New Jersey Devils	1-year	Free agency	
July 1, 2026	Trey Fix-Wolansky	New York Rangers	1-year	Free agency	
July 1, 2026	Jamie Oleksiak	Seattle Kraken	2-year	Free agency	
July 1, 2026	Luke Schenn	Buffalo Sabres	1-year	Free agency	
July 1, 2026	Akil Thomas	St. Louis Blues	1-year	Free agency	
July 2, 2026	Matthew Stienburg	Colorado Avalanche	1-year	Free agency	
September 25, 2026	Leevi Meriläinen	Ottawa Senators	1-year	Waivers	
November 10, 2026	Cameron Crotty	Minnesota Wild	1-year	Waivers	

=== Players lost ===
Date	Player	New team	Term	Via	Ref
July 1, 2026	Teddy Blueger	Toronto Maple Leafs	2-year	Free agency	
July 1, 2026	Curtis Douglas	Seattle Kraken	2-year	Free agency	
July 1, 2026	Danila Klimovich	Philadelphia Flyers	1-year	Free agency	
July 1, 2026	Jiří Patera	Boston Bruins	1-year	Free agency	
July 5, 2026	Chase Stillman	Detroit Red Wings	1-year	Free agency	
July 21, 2026	Nils Åman	Djurgårdens IF (SHL)	3-year	Free agency	
September 8, 2026	Pierre-Olivier Joseph	Carolina Hurricanes	1-year	Free agency	
November 10, 2026	Evander Kane	Sibir Novosibirsk (KHL)	1-year	Free agency	

=== Signings ===
Date	Player	Term	Ref
June 30, 2026	Guillaume Brisebois	1-year	
August 11, 2026	Adam Novotný	3-year†	
September 4, 2026	Zeev Buium	8-year‡	

== Draft picks ==
Below are the Vancouver Canucks selections at the 2026 NHL entry draft, which was held on June 26 and 27, 2026, at the KeyBank Center in Buffalo, New York.

Round	#	Player	Pos	Nationality	College/Junior/Club team
1	3	Caleb Malhotra	C	Canada	Brantford Bulldogs (OHL)
1	24 (Note: The Minnesota Wild's first-round pick went to the Vancouver Canucks as the result of a trade on December 12, 2025, that sent Quinn Hughes to Minnesota in exchange for Marco Rossi, Liam Ohgren, Zeev Buium, and this pick.)	Adam Novotný	LW	Czech Republic	Peterborough Petes (OHL)
2	33	Brooks Rogowski	C	United States	Oshawa Generals (OHL)
2	41 (Note: The San Jose Sharks' second-round pick went to the Vancouver Canucks as the result of a trade on January 19, 2026, that sent Kiefer Sherwood to San Jose in exchange for Cole Clayton, a second-round pick in 2027 and this pick.)	Niklas Aaram-Olsen	RW	Norway	Orebro HK (SHL)
3	78 (Note: The Columbus Blue Jackets' third-round pick went to the Vancouver Canucks as the result of a trade on March 5, 2026, that sent Conor Garland to Columbus in exchange for a second-round pick in 2028 and this pick.)	Dmitri Ivchenko	G	Russia	Omskie Yastreby (MHL)
4	97	Yaroslav Bryzgalov	LW	Belarus	Medicine Hat Tigers (WHL)
5	129	Connor Davis	RW	Canada	Cedar Rapids RoughRiders (USHL)
6	176 (Note: The Washington Capitals' sixth-round pick went to the Vancouver Canucks as the result of a trade on March 6, 2026, that sent David Kampf to Washington in exchange for this pick.)	Lucian Bernat	RW	Slovakia	Tappara U20 (U20 SM-sarja)
6	184 (Note: The Boston Bruins' sixth-round pick went to the Vancouver Canucks as the result of a trade on March 6, 2026, that sent Lukas Reichel to Boston in exchange for this pick.)	Samuel Eriksson	D	Sweden	Färjestad BK U20 (J20 Nationell)
