= William Trudeau =

Canadian ice hockey player (born 2002)

- Born: October 11, 2002 (age 23) Varennes, Quebec, Canada
- Height: 5 ft 11 in (180 cm)
- Weight: 200 lb (91 kg; 14 st 4 lb)
- Position: Defence
- Shoots: Left
- NHL team: Nashville Predators
- NHL draft: 113th overall, 2021; Montreal Canadiens
- Playing career: 2022–present

William Trudeau (born October 11, 2002) is a Canadian professional ice hockey player who is a defenceman for the Nashville Predators of the National Hockey League (NHL). He was selected in the fourth round, 113th overall, by the Montreal Canadiens in the 2021 NHL entry draft.

== Playing career ==
=== Junior ===
Initially drafted by the Drummondville Voltigeurs of the Quebec Major Junior Hockey League (QMJHL), Trudeau began his major junior career with the Charlottetown Islanders after being traded to the team in December 2018. Ranked as the 68th-best prospect amongst North American skaters by NHL Central Scouting Services (CSS) for the 2021 NHL entry draft, he was ultimately selected in the fourth round (113th overall) by the Montreal Canadiens. Over the course of three QMJHL seasons, Trudeau amassed 90 total points (20 goals and 70 assists) between 2019 and 2022.

=== Professional ===
On October 14, 2022, Trudeau was signed to a three-year entry-level contract by the Canadiens organization. During the ensuing 2022–23 season, his rookie professional campaign, he recorded seven goals and 20 assists in 60 games played for Montreal's American Hockey League (AHL) affiliate, the Laval Rocket.

After modest point production in both the 2023–24 and 2024–25 AHL seasons, Trudeau agreed to a one-year, two-way contract with the Canadiens as a restricted free agent on July 3, 2025. Once again assigned to the AHL ranks following a torn pectoral muscle for the 2025–26 season, Trudeau was traded to the New York Rangers in exchange for forward Brett Berard on June 26, 2026. He later agreed to a one-year contract with the Rangers.

After being placed on waivers ahead of the 2026–27 season, he was subsequently claimed by the Nashville Predators. Thereafter, Trudeau made his NHL debut against the Dallas Stars on October 3, 2026.

== Career statistics ==
			Regular season					Playoffs
Season	Team	League	GP	G	A	Pts	PIM	GP	G	A	Pts	PIM
2017–18	Saint-Hyacinthe Gaulois	QMAAA	1	0	0	0	0	—	—	—	—	—
2018–19	Saint-Hyacinthe Gaulois	QMAAA	42	2	17	19	16	6	2	3	5	2
2019–20	Charlottetown Islanders	QMJHL	58	4	11	15	50	—	—	—	—	—
2020–21	Charlottetown Islanders	QMJHL	40	8	23	31	29	8	0	2	2	4
2021–22	Charlottetown Islanders	QMJHL	68	8	36	44	51	14	7	4	11	10
2022–23	Laval Rocket	AHL	60	7	20	27	59	2	0	0	0	0
2023–24	Laval Rocket	AHL	70	8	16	24	69	—	—	—	—	—
2024–25	Laval Rocket	AHL	68	5	14	19	54	8	0	3	3	6
2025–26	Laval Rocket	AHL	62	8	12	20	54	5	0	0	0	12
AHL totals			260	28	62	90	236	15	0	3	3	18
