= Carter Yakemchuk =

Canadian ice hockey player (born 2005)

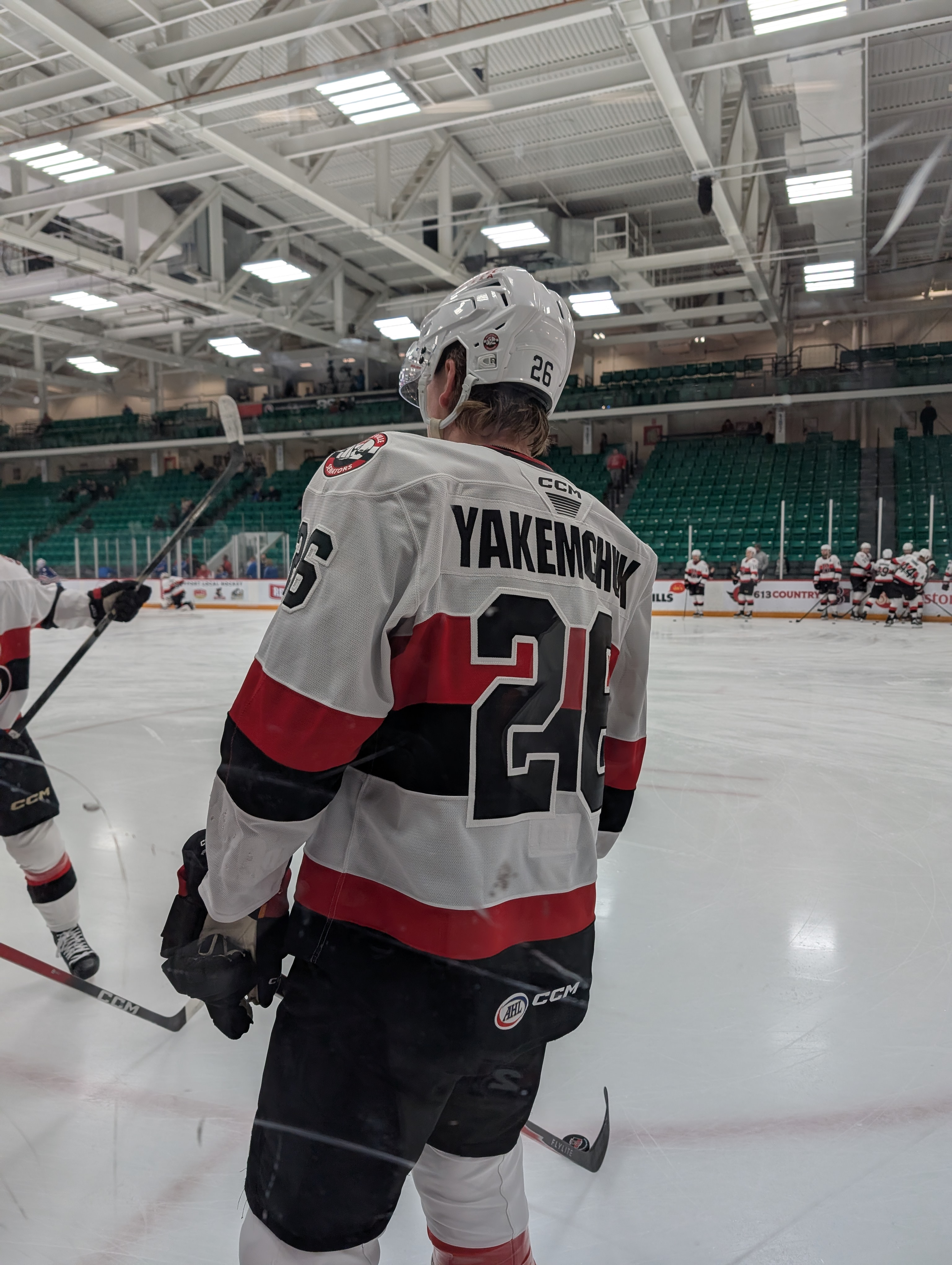
- Carter Yakemchuk warming up with the Belleville Senators in 2025
- Born: September 29, 2005 (age 21) Fort McMurray, Alberta, Canada
- Height: 6 ft 3 in (191 cm)
- Weight: 219 lb (99 kg; 15 st 9 lb)
- Position: Defence
- Shoots: Right
- NHL team: Ottawa Senators
- NHL draft: 7th overall, 2024; Ottawa Senators
- Playing career: 2025–present

Carter Yakemchuk (YA-kehm-chuhk; born September 29, 2005) is a Canadian professional ice hockey player who is a defenceman for the Ottawa Senators of the National Hockey League (NHL). He was selected seventh overall by the Senators in the 2024 NHL entry draft.

== Playing career ==
=== Amateur ===
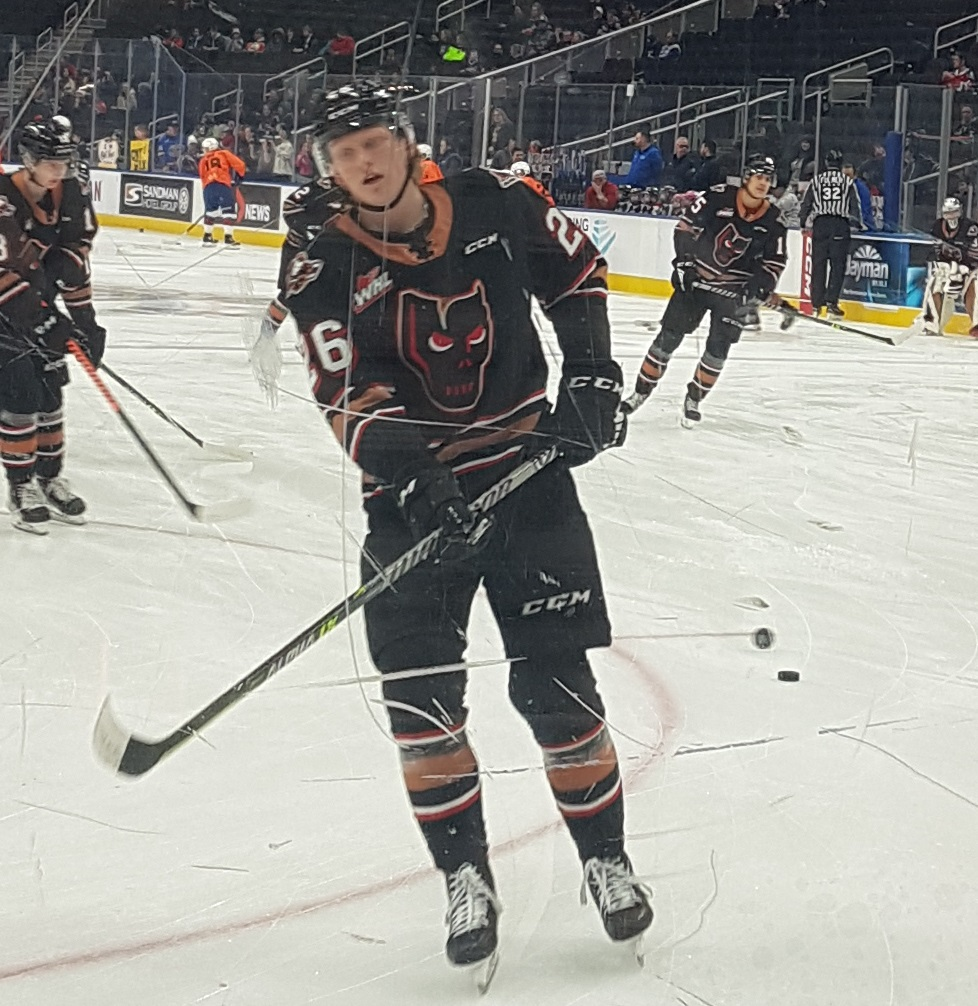
Yakemchuk with the Calgary Hitmen in 2023

Yakemchuk was selected 65th overall in the third round of the 2020 Western Hockey League (WHL) bantam draft by the Calgary Hitmen. In his rookie WHL season in 2021–22, Yakemchuk recorded four goals and eight assists for 12 points, and was named Hitmen rookie of the year. Following the 2022–23 season, in which he recorded 19 goals and 47 points, Yakemchuk was named to the WHL Central Division second all-star team. The Hitmen made the playoffs but were bounced in the first round by the Red Deer Rebels. In five playoff games, Yakemchuk tallied three assists.

In the 2023–24 season, Yakemchuk was selected as one of 40 draft-eligible players to play in the 2024 CHL/NHL Top Prospects Game. He was named WHL Player of the Week for the week ending January 28, 2024. On February 21, Yakemchuk set the Hitmen record for single-season goals by a defenceman, netting his 25th of the season against the Edmonton Oil Kings to surpass the previous mark set by Jake Bean. In his final year in major junior in 2024–25, he recorded 17 goals and 49 points in 56 games with the Hitmen. The Hitmen made the playoffs and advanced to the Eastern Conference semifinal against the Lethbridge Hurricanes where they were eliminated. In 11 playoff games, he added two goals and seven points.

=== Professional ===
Entering the 2024 NHL entry draft, Yakemchuk was considered a consensus first round pick, ranked sixth among North American skaters by NHL Central Scouting in their midseason rankings. Although scouts generally ranked him no lower than tenth overall, some had him as high as third. Yakemchuk was ultimately drafted by the Ottawa Senators at seventh overall. He was later signed to a three-year, entry-level contract with the Senators on August 6, 2024.

Yakemchuk made his professional debut in the 2025–26 season with the Senators American Hockey League (AHL) affiliate, the Belleville Senators, after attending Ottawa's training camp. After several injuries to Ottawa's defencemen, he was called up to Ottawa on March 24, 2026. That night, Yakemchuk played his first NHL game and tallied his first NHL goal and assist. After several games with Ottawa, and the recovery from injury of several of Ottawa's players, he was returned to Belleville on April 8. In 54 games with Belleville, he marked ten goals and 40 points. Later that season, in Ottawa's first round playoff matchup against the Carolina Hurricanes, he was called up for game four to replace an injured Jake Sanderson and tallied two assists. Ultimately, it was a losing effort as the Hurricanes eliminated the Senators.

== International play ==
Medal record

Representing Canada

Men's ice hockey

World U18 Championships
Bronze medal – third place	2023 Switzerland	

Yakemchuk represented Canada at the 2023 IIHF World U18 Championships.

== Career statistics ==
=== Regular season and playoffs ===
			Regular season					Playoffs
Season	Team	League	GP	G	A	Pts	PIM	GP	G	A	Pts	PIM
2021–22	Calgary Hitmen	WHL	56	4	9	13	14	—	—	—	—	—
2022–23	Calgary Hitmen	WHL	67	19	28	47	31	5	0	3	3	10
2023–24	Calgary Hitmen	WHL	66	30	41	71	120	—	—	—	—	—
2024–25	Calgary Hitmen	WHL	56	17	32	49	82	11	2	5	7	4
2025–26	Belleville Senators	AHL	54	10	30	40	36	—	—	—	—	—
2025–26	Ottawa Senators	NHL	4	1	1	2	2	1	0	2	2	0
NHL totals			4	1	1	2	2	1	0	2	2	0

=== International ===
Year	Team	Event	Result	GP	G	A	Pts	PIM
2023	Canada	U18	3rd place, bronze medalist(s)	7	0	0	0	2
Junior totals				7	0	0	0	2

== Awards and honours ==
Award	Year	Ref
WHL
Central Division Second All-Star Team	2023	

Awards and achievements
Preceded by Tyler Boucher	Ottawa Senators first-round draft pick 2024	Succeeded by Logan Hensler
