= Tim Gleason =

American ice hockey player (born 1983)

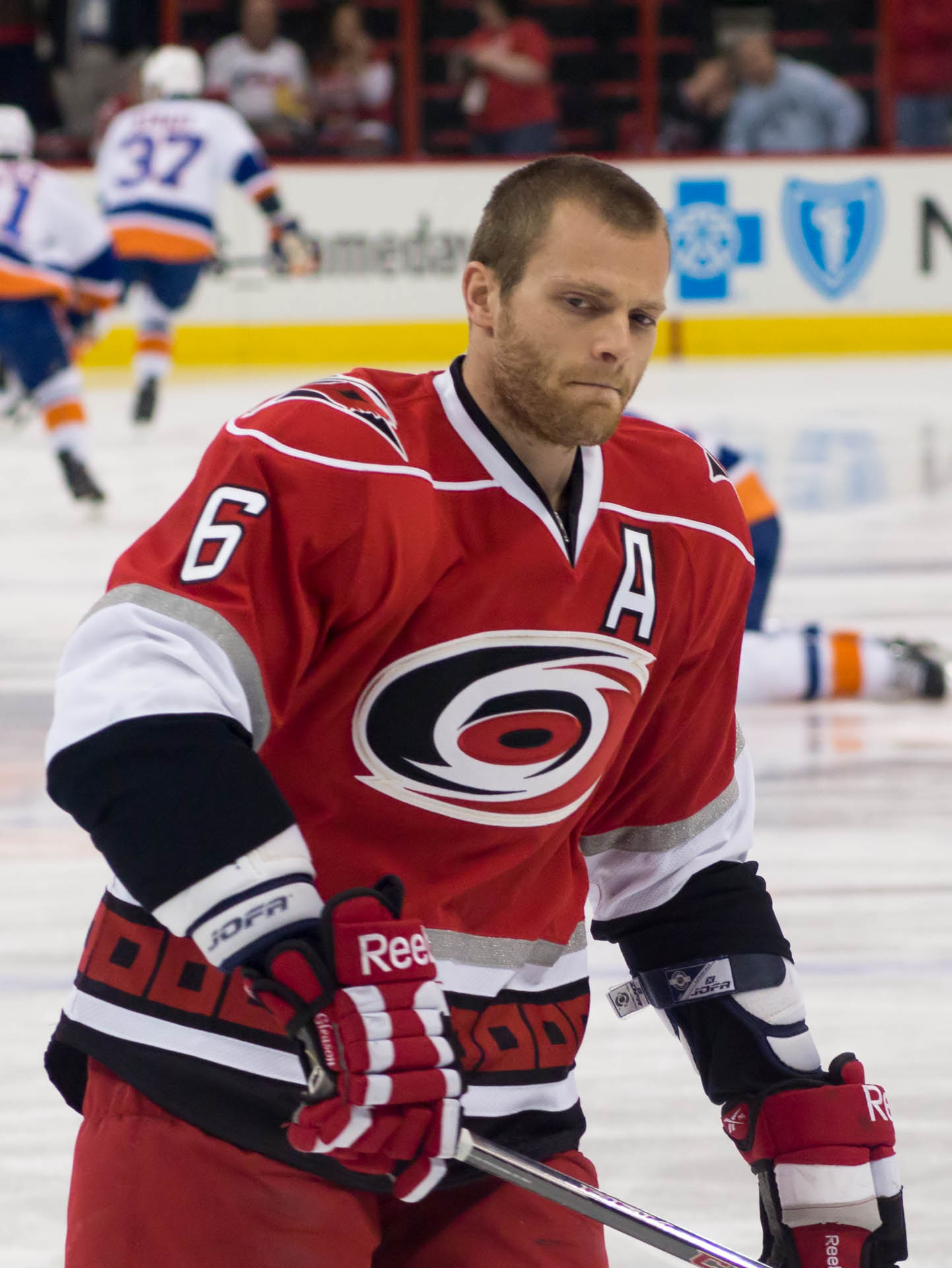
- Gleason with the Carolina Hurricanes in 2013
- Born: January 29, 1983 (age 43) Clawson, Michigan, U.S.
- Height: 6 ft 0 in (183 cm)
- Weight: 217 lb (98 kg; 15 st 7 lb)
- Position: Defense
- Shot: Left
- Played for: Los Angeles Kings; Carolina Hurricanes; Toronto Maple Leafs; Washington Capitals
- National team: United States
- NHL draft: 23rd overall, 2001; Ottawa Senators
- Playing career: 2003–2015

Timothy Patrick Gleason (born January 29, 1983) is an American former professional ice hockey defenseman and current assistant coach to the Carolina Hurricanes. Drafted by the Ottawa Senators in the first round, 23rd overall, at the 2001 NHL entry draft, Gleason played in the NHL for the Los Angeles Kings, Carolina Hurricanes, Toronto Maple Leafs and the Washington Capitals.

== Playing career ==
=== Amateur ===
As a youth, Gleason played in the 1996 Quebec International Pee-Wee Hockey Tournament with the Detroit Little Caesars minor ice hockey team.

After a standout junior ice hockey career with the Ontario Hockey League (OHL)'s Windsor Spitfires, Gleason was drafted in the first round, 23rd overall, of the 2001 NHL entry draft by the Ottawa Senators. Unable to come to terms on a contract with the Senators, Gleason was subsequently traded to the Los Angeles Kings in exchange for forward Bryan Smolinski on March 11, 2003.

=== Professional ===
After spending three years in the Kings organization, Gleason, along with Éric Bélanger, was traded to the Carolina Hurricanes on September 29, 2006, in exchange for defensemen Oleg Tverdovsky and Jack Johnson. Gleason stayed with the Hurricanes until January 1, 2014, when he was acquired by the Toronto Maple Leafs in a trade for John-Michael Liles and Dennis Robertson. On June 30, however, Gleason was placed on unconditional waivers by the Maple Leafs for the purpose of a contract buyout.

On July 3, Gleason returned to the Carolina Hurricanes as a free agent, signing a one-year, $1.2 million contract. In the 2014–15 season, Gleason resumed his physical role on the Hurricanes' blueline, appearing in 55 games and registering seven points before he was traded to the Washington Capitals in exchange for Jack Hillen and a fourth-round draft pick in 2015 on February 28, 2015.

=== International ===
Gleason played for the United States at the 2010 Winter Olympics in Vancouver, winning a silver medal.

== Playing style ==
Gleason is known for his toughness and gritty play, including the diving effort he made for the Hurricanes to prevent the puck from leaving the offensive zone in Game 7 of the 2009 Eastern Conference Semi-finals against the New Jersey Devils, which ultimately led to a game-tying goal. He also took a puck to the face whilst playing against the Washington Capitals in 2009, but returned to the ice after multiple stitches to eventually score the tying goal on a breakaway.

== Personal life ==
Gleason's cousin Ben is also a professional ice hockey player. He is under contract with the Minnesota Wild. In 2017, Gleason and former teammate Cam Ward established a winery in Napa Valley, California.

== Career statistics ==
=== Regular season and playoffs ===
			Regular season					Playoffs
Season	Team	League	GP	G	A	Pts	PIM	GP	G	A	Pts	PIM
1998–99	Leamington Flyers	WOHL	52	5	26	31	76	—	—	—	—	—
1999–2000	Windsor Spitfires	OHL	55	5	13	18	101	12	2	4	6	14
2000–01	Windsor Spitfires	OHL	47	8	28	36	124	9	1	2	3	23
2001–02	Windsor Spitfires	OHL	67	17	42	59	109	16	7	13	20	40
2002–03	Windsor Spitfires	OHL	45	7	31	38	75	7	5	2	7	17
2003–04	Los Angeles Kings	NHL	47	0	7	7	21	—	—	—	—	—
2003–04	Manchester Monarchs	AHL	22	0	8	8	19	6	0	1	1	4
2004–05	Manchester Monarchs	AHL	67	10	14	24	112	5	0	0	0	4
2005–06	Los Angeles Kings	NHL	78	2	19	21	77	—	—	—	—	—
2006–07	Carolina Hurricanes	NHL	57	2	4	6	57	—	—	—	—	—
2007–08	Carolina Hurricanes	NHL	80	3	16	19	84	—	—	—	—	—
2008–09	Carolina Hurricanes	NHL	70	0	12	12	68	18	1	4	5	32
2009–10	Carolina Hurricanes	NHL	61	5	14	19	78	—	—	—	—	—
2010–11	Carolina Hurricanes	NHL	82	2	14	16	85	—	—	—	—	—
2011–12	Carolina Hurricanes	NHL	82	1	17	18	71	—	—	—	—	—
2012–13	Carolina Hurricanes	NHL	42	0	9	9	40	—	—	—	—	—
2013–14	Carolina Hurricanes	NHL	17	0	1	1	10	—	—	—	—	—
2013–14	Toronto Maple Leafs	NHL	39	1	4	5	55	—	—	—	—	—
2014–15	Carolina Hurricanes	NHL	55	1	6	7	44	—	—	—	—	—
2014–15	Washington Capitals	NHL	17	0	2	2	11	14	0	1	1	5
NHL totals			727	17	125	142	701	32	1	5	6	37

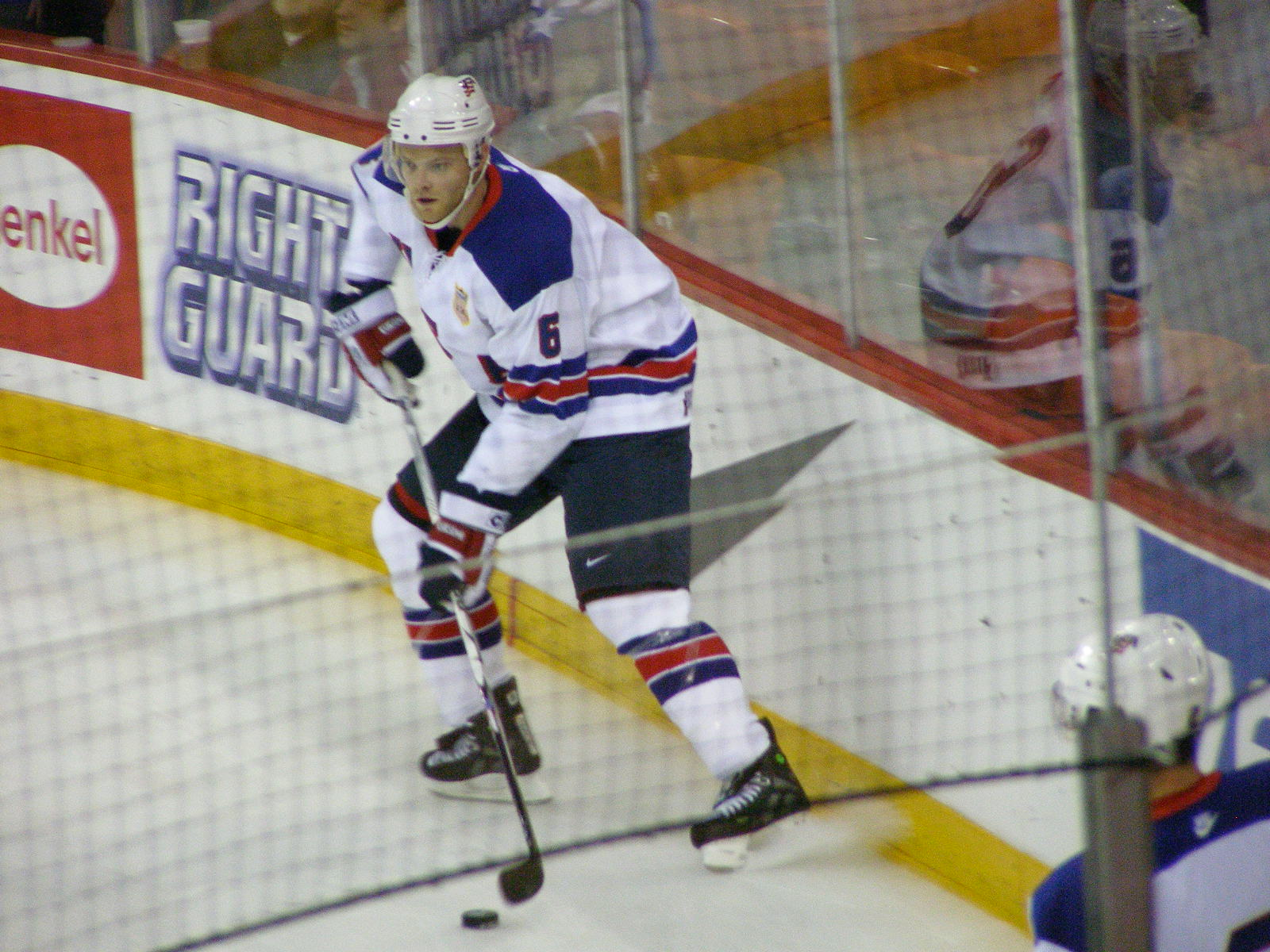
- Gleason during the 2008 IIHF World Championship

Medal record

Representing United States

Ice hockey

Olympic Games
Silver medal – second place	2010 Vancouver	

=== International ===
Year	Team	Event	Result	GP	G	A	Pts	PIM
2000	United States	U17	4th	6	1	1	2	2
2001	United States	WJC	5th	7	0	1	1	2
2003	United States	WJC	4th	1	0	0	0	0
2008	United States	WC	6th	6	0	1	1	6
2010	United States	OG	2nd place, silver medalist(s)	6	0	0	0	0
Junior totals				14	1	2	3	4
Senior totals				12	0	1	1	6

Awards and achievements
Preceded by Jason Spezza	Ottawa Senators first-round draft pick 2001	Succeeded by Jakub Klepiš
