= List of Ottawa Senators draft picks =

The complete list of players drafted by the Ottawa Senators (1992–present) of the National Hockey League (NHL) at the NHL entry draft. The Senators were approved as franchise partners of the NHL in December 1990, and participated in their first entry draft in 1992. That year, the team also participated in the 1992 NHL expansion draft.

== First round picks ==
Year	Overall	Player	Position	Nationality	Club team
1992	2	Alexei Yashin	Centre	Russia	Dynamo Moscow (Russia)
1993	1	Alexandre Daigle	Right wing	Canada	Victoriaville Tigres (QMJHL)
1994	3	Radek Bonk	Centre	Czech Republic	Las Vegas Thunder (IHL)
1995	1	Bryan Berard	Defence	United States	Detroit Jr. Red Wings (OHL)
1996	1	Chris Phillips	Defence	Canada	Prince Albert Raiders (WHL)
1997	12	Marian Hossa	Right wing	Slovakia	HC Dukla Trencin (Slovakia)
1998	15	Mathieu Chouinard	Goalie	Canada	Shawinigan Cataractes (QMJHL)
1999	26	Martin Havlat	Right wing	Czech Republic	HC Trinec Ocelari (Czech.)
2000	21	Anton Volchenkov	Defence	Russia	Krylja Sovetov (Russia)
2001	2 (from NYI)	Jason Spezza	Centre	Canada	Windsor Spitfires (OHL)
2001	23	Tim Gleason	Defence	United States	Windsor Spitfires (OHL)
2002	16	Jakub Klepis	Centre	Czech Republic	Portland Winterhawks (WHL)
2003	29	Patrick Eaves	Right wing	United States	Boston College (NCAA)
2004	23	Andrej Meszaros	Defence	Slovakia	HC Dukla Trencin (Slovakia)
2005	9	Brian Lee	Defence	United States	Lincoln Stars (USHL)
2006	28	Nick Foligno	Left wing	United States	Sudbury Wolves (OHL)
2007	29	Jim O'Brien	Centre	United States	University of Minnesota (NCAA)
2008	15	Erik Karlsson	Defence	Sweden	Frolunda HC (Sweden)
2009	9	Jared Cowen	Defence	Canada	Spokane Chiefs (WHL)
2011	6	Mika Zibanejad	Centre	Sweden	Djurgardens IF (SEL)
2011	21 (from Nashville)	Stefan Noesen	Right wing	United States	Plymouth Whalers (OHL)
2011	24 (from Detroit)	Matt Puempel	Left wing	Canada	Peterborough Petes (OHL)
2012	15	Cody Ceci	Defence	Canada	Ottawa 67's (OHL)
2013	17	Curtis Lazar	Centre/Right Wing	Canada	Edmonton Oil Kings (WHL)
2015	18	Thomas Chabot	Defence	Canada	Saint John Sea Dogs (QMJHL)
2015	21 (from NYI via BUF)	Colin White	Centre	United States	U.S. National Team Development Program (USHL)
2016	11 (from NJ)	Logan Brown	Centre	United States	Windsor Spitfires (OHL)
2017	28	Shane Bowers	Centre	Canada	Waterloo Black Hawks (USHL)
2018	4	Brady Tkachuk	Left wing	United States	Boston University (HE)
2018	26 (from BOS via NYR)	Jacob Bernard-Docker	Defence	Canada	Okotoks Oilers (AJHL)
2019	19 (from Columbus)	Lassi Thomson	Defence	Finland	Kelowna Rockets (WHL)
2020	3 (from San Jose)	Tim Stutzle	Centre	Germany	Adler Mannheim (DEL)
2020	5	Jake Sanderson	Defence	United States	U.S. National Team Development Program (USHL)
2020	28 (from NYI)	Ridly Greig	Centre	Canada	Brandon Wheat Kings (WHL)
2021	10	Tyler Boucher	Right wing	United States	U.S. National Team Development Program (USHL)
2024	7	Carter Yakemchuk	Defence	Canada	Calgary Hitmen (WHL)
2025	23 (from Nashville)	Logan Hensler	Defence	United States	Wisconsin Badgers (B1G)
2026	25 (from Tampa Bay via Seattle and Florida)	Jonas Lagerberg Hoen	Right Wing	Sweden	Leksands IF (SHL)
2026	32	Jaxon Cover	Left Wing	Cayman Islands	London Knights (OHL)

== 1992 Draft picks ==
Ottawa's draft picks at the 1992 NHL entry draft held on June 20, 1992, at the Montreal Forum in Montreal, Quebec.

Round	Overall	Player	Position	Nationality	Club team
1	2	Alexei Yashin	Centre	Russia	Dynamo Moscow (Russia)
2	25	Chad Penney	Left wing	Canada	North Bay Centennials (OHL)
3	50	Patrick Traverse	Defence	Canada	Shawinigan Cataractes (QMJHL)
4	73	Radek Hamr	Defence	Czechoslovakia	Sparta Praha (Czech.)
5	98	Daniel Guerard	Right wing	Canada	Victoriaville Tigres (QMJHL)
6	121	Alan Sinclair	Defence	United States	University of Michigan (NCAA)
7	146	Jaroslav Miklenda	Defence	Czechoslovakia	HC Olomouc (Czech.)
8	169	Jay Kenney	Defence	United States	New Milford Canterbury School (US HS)
9	194	Claude Savoie	Right wing	Canada	Victoriaville Tigres (QMJHL)
10	217	Jake Grimes	Centre	Canada	Belleville Bulls (OHL)
11	242	Tomas Jelinek	Right wing	Czechoslovakia	HPK (Finland)
11	264	Petter Ronnquist	Goalie	Sweden	Nacka HK (Sweden)

== 1993 Draft picks ==
Ottawa's draft picks at the 1993 NHL entry draft held on June 26, 1993, at the Colisée de Québec in Quebec City, Quebec.

Round	Overall	Player	Position	Nationality	Club team
1	1	Alexandre Daigle	Right wing	Canada	Victoriaville Tigres (QMJHL)
2	27	Radim Bicanek	Defence	Czech Republic	HC Dukla Jihlava (Czech.)
3	53	Patrick Charbonneau	Goalie	Canada	Victoriaville Tigres (QMJHL)
4	91 (from New Jersey)	Cosmo Dupaul	Left wing	Canada	Victoriaville Tigres (QMJHL)
6	131	Rick Bodkin	Centre	Canada	Sudbury Wolves (OHL)
7	157	Sergei Polischuk	Defence	Russia	Krylja Sovetov (Russia)
8	183	Jason Disher	Defence	Canada	Kingston Frontenacs (OHL)
9	209	Toby Kvalevog	Goalie	United States	University of North Dakota (NCAA)
9	227 (from Toronto)	Pavol Demitra	Centre	Slovakia	HC Dukla Trencin (Czech.)
10	235	Rick Schuhwerk	Defence	United States	Hingham High School (US HS)

=== Transactions ===
1. The Senators' fourth-round pick went to the Winnipeg Jets as the result of a trade on March 4, 1993 that sent the rights to Dmitri Filimonov to Ottawa in exchange for this pick.
2. The New Jersey Devils' fourth-round pick went to the Senators as the result of a trade on June 20, 1993 that sent Peter Sidorkiewicz, future considerations (Mike Peluso on June 26, 1993) and a fifth-round pick in 1994 to New Jersey in exchange for Craig Billington, Troy Mallette and this pick.
3. The Senators' fifth-round pick went to the Los Angeles Kings as the result of a trade on March 22, 1993 that sent John McIntyre to New York in exchange for this pick.
4. The Toronto Maple Leafs' ninth-round pick went to the Senators as the result of a trade on February 25, 1993 that sent Brad Miller to Toronto in exchange for this pick.
5. The Senators' eleventh-round pick went to the New York Rangers as the result of a trade on June 20, 1992 that sent an eleventh-round pick in 1992 to Ottawa in exchange for future considerations (this pick on May 7, 1993).

== 1994 Draft picks ==
Ottawa's draft picks at the 1994 NHL entry draft held on June 28 and 29, 1994, at the Hartford Civic Center in Hartford, Connecticut.

Round	Overall	Player	Position	Nationality	Club team
1	3	Radek Bonk	Centre	Czech Republic	Las Vegas Thunder (IHL)
2	29	Stanislav Neckar	Defence	Czech Republic	HC Ceske Budejovice (Czech.)
4	81	Bryan Masotta	Goalie	United States	Hotchkiss Academy (US HS)
6	131 (from Florida)	Mike Gaffney	Defence	United States	La Salle High School (US HS)
6	133	Daniel Alfredsson	Right wing	Sweden	Frolunda HC (Sweden)
7	159	Doug Sproule	Forward	United States	Hotchkiss Academy (US HS)
9	210 (from Anaheim)	Frederic Cassivi	Goalie	Canada	Saint-Hyacinthe Laser (QMJHL)
9	211	Danny Dupont	Defence	Canada	Laval Titan (QMJHL)
10	237	Steve MacKinnon	Forward	United States	Chelmsford High School (US HS)
11	274 (from Chicago)	Antti Tormanen	Left wing	Finland	Jokerit (Finland)

=== Transactions ===
1. The Senators' third-round pick went to the Tampa Bay Lightning as the result of a trade on June 29, 1994 that sent the Washington Capitals' third-round pick in 1994 (67th overall) and a 1995 (82nd overall) to the Mighty Ducks of Anaheim in exchange for this pick.
2. Anaheim previously acquired this pick as the result of a trade on June 28, 1994 that sent Sean Hill and a ninth-round pick in 1994 (210th overall) to Ottawa in exchange for this pick.
3. The Senators' fifth-round pick went to the Calgary Flames.
4. The Senators' eleventh-round pick went to the Chicago Blackhawks.

== 1995 Draft picks ==
Ottawa's draft picks at the 1995 NHL entry draft held on July 28, 1995, at Edmonton Coliseum in Edmonton, Alberta.

Round	Overall	Player	Position	Nationality	Club team
1	1	Bryan Berard	Defence	United States	Detroit Jr. Red Wings (OHL)
2	27	Marc Moro	Defence	Canada	Kingston Frontenacs (OHL)
3	53	Brad Larsen	Left wing	Canada	Swift Current Broncos (WHL)
4	89 (from Dallas)	Kevin Bolibruck	Defence	Canada	Peterborough Petes (OHL)
4	103 (from Colorado)	Kevin Boyd	Left wing	Canada	London Knights (OHL)
6	131	David Hruska	Forward	Czech Republic	Banik Sokolov (Czech.)
8	183	Kaj Linna	Defence	Finland	Boston University (NCAA)
8	184 (from NY Islanders)	Ray Schultz	Defence	Canada	Tri-City Americans (WHL)
9	231 (from St. Louis)	Erik Kaminski	Right wing	United States	Northeastern University (NCAA)

=== Transactions ===
1. The Senators' fourth-round pick went to the New Jersey Devils, traded for Jaroslav Modry.
2. The Dallas Star's fourth-round pick went to the Senators.
3. The Colorado Avalanche's fourth-round pick went to the Senators.
4. The Senators' fifth-round pick went to the Washington Capitals.
5. The Senators' seventh-round pick went to the Los Angeles Kings.
6. The Islanders' eighth-round pick went to the Senators.
7. The Senators' ninth-round pick went to the St. Louis Blues
8. The St. Louis Blues ninth-round pick went to the Senators.

== 1996 Draft picks ==
Ottawa's draft picks from the 1996 NHL entry draft held on June 22, 1996, at the Kiel Center in St. Louis, Missouri.

Round	Overall	Player	Position	Nationality	Club team
1	1	Chris Phillips	Defence	Canada	Prince Albert Raiders (WHL)
4	81	Antti-Jussi Niemi	Defence	Finland	Jokerit (Finland)
6	136	Andreas Dackell	Right wing	Sweden	Brynas IF (Sweden)
7	163	Francois Hardy	Defence	Canada	Val-d'Or Foreurs (QMJHL)
8	212	Erich Goldmann	Defence	Germany	Adler Mannheim (Germany)
9	216	Ivan Ciernik	Left wing	Slovakia	MHC Plastika Nitra (Slovakia)
9	239	Sami Salo	Defence	Finland	TPS (Finland)

== 1997 Draft picks ==
Ottawa's draft picks from the 1997 NHL entry draft held on June 21, 1997, at the Pittsburgh Civic Arena in Pittsburgh, Pennsylvania.

Round	Overall	Player	Position	Nationality	Club team
1	12	Marian Hossa	Right wing	Slovakia	HC Dukla Trencin (Slovakia)
3	58	Jani Hurme	Goalie	Finland	TPS (Finland)
3	66	Josh Langfeld	Right wing	United States	Lincoln Stars (USHL)
5	119	Magnus Arvedson	Left wing	Sweden	Farjestad BK (Sweden)
6	146	Jeff Sullivan	Defence	Canada	Halifax Mooseheads (QMJHL)
7	173	Robin Bacul	Forward	Czech Republic	Slavia Praha (Czech.)
8	203	Nick Gillis	Forward	United States	Cushing Academy (USHS)
9	229	Karel Rachunek	Defence	Czech Republic	Zlin ZPS (Czech.)

== 1998 Draft picks ==
Ottawa's draft picks from the 1998 NHL entry draft held on June 27, 1998, at the Marine Midland Arena in Buffalo, New York.

Round	Overall	Player	Position	Nationality	Club team
1	15	Mathieu Chouinard	Goalie	Canada	Shawinigan Cataractes (QMJHL)
2	44	Mike Fisher	Centre	Canada	Sudbury Wolves (OHL)
2	58	Chris Bala	Left wing	United States	Harvard University (NCAA)
3	74	Julien Vauclair	Defence	Switzerland	HC Lugano (Switzerland)
4	101	Petr Schastlivy	Left wing	Russia	Yaroslavl Torpedo (Russia)
5	130	Gavin McLeod	Defence	Canada	Kelowna Rockets (WHL)
6	161	Chris Neil	Right wing	Canada	North Bay Centennials (OHL)
7	188	Michel Périard	Defence	Canada	Shawinigan Cataractes (QMJHL)
8	223	Sergei Verenkin	Forward	Russia	Yaroslavl Torpedo (Russia)
9	246	Rastislav Pavlikovsky	Left wing	Slovakia	Utah Grizzlies (IHL)

== 1999 Draft picks ==
Ottawa's draft picks from the 1999 NHL entry draft held on June 26, 1999, at the FleetCenter in Boston, Massachusetts.

Round	Overall	Player	Position	Nationality	Club team
1	26	Martin Havlat	Left wing	Czech Republic	HC Ocelari Trinec (Czech.)
2	48	Simon Lajeunesse	Goalie	Canada	Moncton Wildcats (QMJHL)
2	62	Teemu Sainomaa	Centre	Finland	Jokerit (Finland)
3	94	Chris Kelly	Centre	Canada	London Knights (OHL)
5	154	Andrew Ianiero	Left wing	Canada	Kingston Frontenacs (OHL)
6	164	Martin Prusek	Goalie	Czech Republic	HC Vitkovice Ostrava (Czech.)
7	201	Mikko Ruutu	Right wing	Finland	HIFK (Finland)
7	209	Layne Ulmer	Centre	Canada	Swift Current Broncos (WHL)
7	213	Alexandre Giroux	Centre	Canada	Hull Olympiques (QMJHL)
9	269	Konstantin Gorovikov	Right wing	Russia	SKA Saint Petersburg (Russia)

== 2000 Draft picks ==
Ottawa's draft picks from the 2000 NHL entry draft held on June 24 and 25, 2000, at the Saddledome in Calgary, Alberta.

Round	Overall	Player	Position	Nationality	Club team
1	21	Anton Volchenkov	Defence	Russia	Krylja Sovetov (Russia)
2	45	Mathieu Chouinard	Goalie	Canada	Shawinigan Cataractes (QMJHL)
2	55	Antoine Vermette	Centre	Canada	Victoriaville Tigres (QMJHL)
3	87	Jan Bohac	Forward	Czech Republic	Slavia Praha (Czech Republic)
4	122	Derrick Byfuglien	Defence	United States	Fargo-Moorhead Ice Sharks (USHL)
5	156	Greg Zanon	Defence	Canada	University of Nebraska-Omaha (NCAA)
5	157	Grant Potulny	Centre	United States	Lincoln Stars (USHL)
5	158	Sean Connolly	Defence	United States	Marquette Northern Michigan University (NCAA)
6	188	Jason Maleyko	Defence	Canada	Brampton Battalion (OHL)
9	283	Christopher Pidwerbecki	Defence	Canada	Newmarket Hurricanes (OPJHL)

== 2001 Draft picks ==
Ottawa's draft picks from the 2001 NHL entry draft held on June 23 and 24, 2001, at the National Car Rental Center in Sunrise, Florida.

Round	Overall	Player	Position	Nationality	Club team
1	2	Jason Spezza	Centre	Canada	Windsor Spitfires (OHL)
1	23	Tim Gleason	Defence	United States	Windsor Spitfires (OHL)
3	81	Neil Komadoski	Defence	United States	University of Notre Dame (NCAA)
4	99	Ray Emery	Goalie	Canada	Sault Ste. Marie Greyhounds (OHL)
4	127	Christoph Schubert	Defence	Germany	Munich Barons (Germany)
5	162	Stefan Schauer	Defence	Germany	Garmisch-Partenkirchen Riessersee SC (Germany 2)
6	193	Brooks Laich	Centre	Canada	Moose Jaw Warriors (WHL)
7	218	Jan Platil	Defence	Czech Republic	Barrie Colts (OHL)
7	223	Brandon Bochenski	Right wing	United States	University of North Dakota (NCAA)
8	235	Neil Petruic	Defence	Canada	Kindersley Klippers (SJHL)
8	256	Gregg Johnson	Forward	United States	Boston University (NCAA)
9	286	Toni Dahlman	Right wing	Finland	Ilves (Finland)

== 2002 Draft picks ==
Ottawa's draft picks from the 2002 NHL entry draft held on June 22 and 23, 2002, at the Air Canada Centre in Toronto, Ontario.

Round	Overall	Player	Position	Nationality	Club team
1	16	Jakub Klepis	Centre	Czech Republic	Portland Winterhawks (WHL)
2	47	Alexei Kaigorodov	Centre	Russia	Metallurg Magnitogorsk (Russia)
3	75	Arttu Luttinen	Left wing	Finland	HIFK (Finland)
4	113	Scott Dobben	Forward	Canada	Erie Otters (OHL)
4	125	Johan Bjork	Defence	Sweden	Malmo Redhawks (Sweden)
5	150	Brock Hooton	Right wing	Canada	Quesnel Millionaires (BCHL)
8	246	Josef Vavra	Left wing	Czech Republic	Vsetin HC (Czech.)
9	276	Vitaly Atyushov	Defence	Russia	Molot-Prikamye Perm (Russia)

== 2003 Draft picks ==
Ottawa's draft picks from the 2003 NHL entry draft held on June 21 and 22, 2003, at the Gaylord Entertainment Center in Nashville, Tennessee.

Round	Overall	Player	Position	Nationality	Club team
1	29	Patrick Eaves	Right wing	United States	Boston College (NCAA)
2	67	Igor Mirnov	Forward	Russia	Dynamo Moscow (Russia)
3	100	Philippe Seydoux	Defence	Switzerland	Kloten Flyers (Switzerland)
4	135	Mattias Karlsson	Defence	Sweden	Brynas IF (Sweden)
5	142	Tim Cook	Defence	United States	River City Lancers (USHL)
5	166	Sergei Gimayev	Defence	Russia	Severstal Cherepovets (Russia)
7	228	Will Colbert	Defence	Canada	Ottawa 67's (OHL)
8	269	Ossi Louhivaara	Forward	Finland	Kookoo (Finland)
9	291	Brian Elliott	Goalie	Canada	University of Wisconsin–Madison (NCAA)

== 2004 Draft picks ==
Ottawa's draft picks from the 2004 NHL entry draft held on June 26 and 27, 2004, at the RBC Center in Raleigh, North Carolina.

Round	Overall	Player	Position	Nationality	Club team
1	23	Andrej Meszaros	Defence	Slovakia	HC Dukla Trencin (Slovakia)
2	58	Kirill Lyamin	Defence	Russia	CSKA Moscow (Russia)
3	77	Shawn Weller	Left wing	United States	Capital District Selects (EJHL)
3	87	Peter Regin	Centre	Denmark	Herning IK (Denmark)
3	89	Jeff Glass	Goalie	Canada	Kootenay Ice (WHL)
4	122	Alexander Nikulin	Centre	Russia	CSKA Moscow (Russia)
5	141	Jim McKenzie	Right wing	United States	Sioux Falls Stampede (USHL)
5	156	Roman Wick	Right wing	Switzerland	Kloten Flyers (Switzerland)
7	219	Joe Cooper	Right wing	Canada	Miami University (NCAA)
8	251	Matt McIlvane	Centre	United States	Chicago Steel (USHL)
9	284	John Wikner	Left wing	Sweden	Frolunda HC (Sweden)

== 2005 Draft picks ==
Ottawa's draft picks from the 2005 NHL entry draft held on July 30, 2005, at the Westin Hotel in Ottawa, Ontario.

Round	Overall	Player	Position	Nationality	Club team
1	9	Brian Lee	Defence	United States	Lincoln Stars (USHL)
3	70	Vitaly Anikienko	Defence	Russia	Lokomotiv Yaroslavl (Russia)
4	95	Cody Bass	Centre	Canada	Mississauga IceDogs (OHL)
4	98	Ilya Zubov	Centre	Russia	Traktor Chelyabinsk (Russia)
4	115	Janne Kolehmainen	Left wing	Finland	SaiPa (Finland)
5	136	Tomas Kudelka	Defence	Czech Republic	Zlin ZPS (Czech.)
6	186	Dmitri Megalinsky	Defence	Russia	Lokomotiv Yaroslavl (Russia)
7	204	Colin Greening	Left wing	Canada	Upper Canada College (OFSAA)

== 2006 Draft picks ==
Ottawa's draft picks from the 2006 NHL entry draft held on June 24, 2006, at General Motors Place in Vancouver, British Columbia.

Round	Overall	Player	Position	Nationality	Club team
1	28	Nick Foligno	Left wing	United States	Sudbury Wolves (OHL)
3	68	Eric Gryba	Defence	Canada	Green Bay Gamblers (USHL)
3	91	Kaspars Daugavins	Left wing	Latvia	HK Riga 2000 (Latvia)
4	121	Pierre-Luc Lessard	Defence	Canada	Gatineau Olympiques (QMJHL)
5	151	Ryan Daniels	Goalie	Canada	Saginaw Spirit (OHL)
6	181	Kevin Koopman	Defence	Canada	Vernon Vipers (BCHL)
7	211	Erik Condra	Right wing	United States	University of Notre Dame (NCAA)

== 2007 Draft picks ==
Ottawa's draft picks at the 2007 NHL entry draft held on June 22 and 23, 2007, at Nationwide Arena in Columbus, Ohio.

Round	Overall	Player	Position	Nationality	Club team
1	29	Jim O'Brien	Centre	United States	University of Minnesota (NCAA)
2	60	Ruslan Bashkirov	Left wing	Russia	Quebec Remparts (QMJHL)
3	90	Louie Caporusso	Left wing	Canada	St. Michael's Buzzers (OPJRA)
4	120	Ben Blood	Defence	United States	Shattuck-Saint Mary's (Midget Major AAA)

== 2008 Draft picks ==
Ottawa's picks at the 2008 NHL entry draft at Scotiabank Place in Ottawa, Ontario.

Round	Overall	Player	Position	Nationality	Club team
1	15	Erik Karlsson	Defence	Sweden	Frolunda HC (Gothenburg) (Sweden)
2	42	Patrick Wiercioch	Defence	Canada	Omaha Lancers (USHL)
3	79	Zack Smith	Centre	Canada	Swift Current Broncos (WHL)
4	109	Andre Petersson	Forward	Sweden	HV71 (Sweden)
4	119	Derek Grant	Center	Canada	Langley Chiefs (BCHL)
5	139	Mark Borowiecki	Defence	Canada	Smiths Falls Bears (CJHL)
7	199	Emil Sandin	Forward	Sweden	Brynas IF (Sweden)

== 2009 Draft picks ==
The 2009 NHL entry draft was held in Montreal, Quebec, on June 26–27, 2009. Ottawa made the following picks:

Round	Overall	Player	Position	Nationality	Club team
1	9	Jared Cowen	Defence	Canada	Spokane Chiefs (WHL)
2	39	Jakob Silfverberg	Right wing/Left Wing	Sweden	Brynas IF (Sweden)
2	46 (from Columbus)	Robin Lehner	Goalie	Sweden	Frolunda HC (Sweden)
4	100	Chris Wideman	Defence	United States	Miami University (CCHA)
5	130	Mike Hoffman	Centre/Left Wing	Canada	Drummondville Voltigeurs (QMJHL)
5	146 (from Boston via Phoenix)	Jeff Costello	Left wing	United States	Cedar Rapids RoughRiders (USHL)
6	160	Corey Cowick	Left wing	Canada	Ottawa 67's (OHL)
7	190	Brad Peltz	Left wing	United States	Avon Old Farms (HS-CT)
7	191 (from Edmonton)	Michael Sdao	Defence	United States	Lincoln Stars (USHL)

=== 2009 Draft transactions ===
- The Columbus Blue Jackets' second-round pick went to the Senators as the result of a trade on March 4, 2009 that sent Antoine Vermette to Columbus in exchange for Pascal Leclaire and this pick.
- The Senators' third-round pick went to the Nashville Predators as the result of a trade on June 20, 2008, that sent a first-round pick in 2008 to Ottawa in exchange for a first-round pick in 2008 and this pick.
- The Boston Bruins' fifth-round pick went to the Senators as the result of a trade on June 25, 2008, that sent Brian McGrattan to the Phoenix Coyotes for this pick. Phoenix previously acquired this pick as the result of a trade on December 6, 2007, that sent Alex Auld to Boston for Nate DiCasmirro and this pick.
- The Edmonton Oilers' seventh-round pick went to the Senators as the result of a trade on June 27, 2009, that sent a sixth-round pick in 2010 to Edmonton in exchange for this pick.

== 2010 Draft picks ==
The 2010 NHL entry draft was held in Los Angeles, California, on June 25–26, 2010. Ottawa made the following picks:

Round	Overall	Player	Position	Nationality	Club team
3	76	Jakub Culek	Left wing	Czech Republic	Rimouski Oceanic (QMJHL)
4	106	Marcus Sorensen	Right wing	Sweden	Sodertalje SK (Sweden)
6	178 (from San Jose)	Mark Stone	Right wing	Canada	Brandon Wheat Kings (WHL)
7	196	Bryce Aneloski	Left wing	United States	Cedar Rapids RoughRiders (USHL)

=== 2010 Draft transactions ===
1. The Senators' first-round pick went to the St. Louis Blues as the result of a trade on June 25, 2010 that sent David Rundblad to Ottawa in exchange for the pick.
2. The Senators' second-round pick went to the Edmonton Oilers as the result of a trade on June 26, 2010 that sent the rights to Riley Nash to the Carolina Hurricanes in exchange for the pick. Carolina previously acquired the pick as the result of a trade on February 12, 2010 that sent Matt Cullen to Ottawa in exchange for Alexandre R. Picard and this pick.
3. The Senators' fifth-round pick went to the San Jose Sharks as the result of a trade on September 12, 2009 that sent Milan Michalek, Jonathan Cheechoo and a second-round pick in 2010 to Ottawa in exchange for Dany Heatley and this pick. The Senators traded the Sharks' second-round pick to the Islanders for Andy Sutton.

== 2011 Draft picks ==
The 2011 NHL entry draft was held in Saint Paul, Minnesota, on June 24–25, 2011. The Senators decided to break up their team and start to rebuild. As a result of trading several veterans for draft picks, Ottawa had a total of ten draft picks. Ottawa had three in the first round after trading Mike Fisher to Nashville and trading two second-round picks to Detroit on draft day for their first-round pick. Ottawa made the following picks:

Round	Overall	Player	Position	Nationality	Club team
1	6	Mika Zibanejad	Centre	Sweden	Djurgardens IF (SEL)
1	21 (from Nashville)	Stefan Noesen	Right wing	United States	Plymouth Whalers (OHL)
1	24 (from Detroit)	Matt Puempel	Left wing	Canada	Peterborough Petes (OHL)
2	61 (from Boston)	Shane Prince	Left wing	United States	Ottawa 67's (OHL)
4	96	Jean-Gabriel Pageau	Centre	Canada	Gatineau Olympiques (QMJHL)
5	126	Fredrik Claesson	Defence	Sweden	Djurgardens IF (SEL)
6	156	Darren Kramer	Centre	Canada	Spokane Chiefs (WHL)
6	171 (from Phoenix)	Max McCormick	Left wing	United States	Sioux City Musketeers (USHL)
7	186	Jordan Fransoo	Defence	Canada	Brandon Wheat Kings (WHL)
7	204 (from Pittsburgh)	Ryan Dzingel	Centre	United States	Lincoln Stars (USHL)

== 2012 Draft picks ==
The 2012 NHL entry draft was held in Pittsburgh, Pennsylvania on June 22–23, 2012. Ottawa made the following picks:

Round	Overall	Player	Position	Nationality	Club team
1	15	Cody Ceci	Defence	Canada	Ottawa 67's (OHL)
3	76	Chris Driedger	Goalie	Canada	Calgary Hitmen (WHL)
3	82 (from Nashville)	Jarrod Maidens	Centre/Left Wing	Canada	Owen Sound Attack (OHL)
4	106	Tim Boyle	Defence	United States	Noble and Greenough School (USHS-MA)
5	136	Robert Baillargeon	Centre	United States	Indiana Ice (USHL)
6	166	Francois Brassard	Goalie	Canada	Quebec Remparts (QMJHL)
7	196	Mikael Wikstrand	Defence	Sweden	Mora IK (Allsvenskan)

== 2013 Draft picks ==
The 2013 NHL entry draft was held in Newark, New Jersey on June 30, 2013. Ottawa made the following picks:

Round	Overall	Player	Position	Nationality	Club team
1	17	Curtis Lazar	Centre/Right Wing	Canada	Edmonton Oil Kings (WHL)
3	78	Marcus Hogberg	Goalie	Sweden	Linkopings HC (SE)
4	102 (from Philadelphia via Tampa Bay)	Tobias Lindberg	Right wing	Sweden	Djurgardens IF (SE)
4	108	Ben Harpur	Defence	Canada	Guelph Storm (OHL)
5	138	Vincent Dunn	Centre	Canada	Val-d'Or Foreurs (QMJHL)
6	161 (from Dallas)	Chris Leblanc	Right wing	United States	South Shore Kings (EJHL)
6	168	Quentin Shore	Centre	United States	University of Denver (WCHA)

=== 2012 Draft transactions ===
1. The Ottawa Senators' second-round pick went to the St. Louis Blues as the result of a trade on February 26, 2012, that sent Ben Bishop to Ottawa in exchange for this pick.
2. The Philadelphia Flyers' fourth-round pick went to the Ottawa Senators as the result of a trade on April 3, 2013, that sent Ben Bishop to Tampa Bay in exchange for Cory Conacher and this pick. Tampa Bay previously acquired this pick as the result of a trade on February 18, 2012 that sent Pavel Kubina to Philadelphia in exchange for a conditional second-round pick in either 2012 or 2013 and this pick.
3. The Dallas Stars' sixth-round pick went to the Ottawa Senators as the result of a trade on June 7, 2013, that sent Sergei Gonchar to Dallas in exchange for this pick (being conditional at the time of the trade). The condition – Ottawa will receive a sixth-round pick in 2013 if Gonchar signs with Dallas prior to the 2013 NHL entry draft – was converted on June 8, 2013.

== 2014 Draft picks ==
The 2014 NHL entry draft was held in Philadelphia, Pennsylvania on June 27–28, 2014. Ottawa made the following picks:

Round	Overall	Player	Position	Nationality	Club team
2	40	Andreas Englund	Defence	Sweden	Djurgardens IF (J20 SuperElit)
3	70	Miles Gendron	Defence	United States	Rivers School (NEPSAC)
4	100	Shane Eiserman	Left wing	United States	Dubuque Fighting Saints (USHL)
7	189 (from Winnipeg)	Kelly Summers	Defence	Canada	Carleton Place Canadians (CCHL)
7	190	Francis Perron	Left wing	Canada	Rouyn-Noranda Huskies (QMJHL)

=== 2014 Draft transactions ===
1. The Ottawa Senators' first-round pick went to the Anaheim Ducks as the result of a trade on July 5, 2013, that sent Bobby Ryan to Ottawa in exchange for Jakob Silfverberg, Stefan Noesen and this pick.
2. The Ottawa Senators' fifth-round pick went to the Edmonton Oilers as the result of a trade on March 5, 2014, that sent Ales Hemsky to Ottawa in exchange for a third-round pick in 2015 and this pick.
3. The Ottawa Senators' sixth-round pick went to the Minnesota Wild as the result of a trade on March 12, 2013, that sent Matt Kassian to Ottawa in exchange for this pick.
4. The Winnipeg Jets' seventh-round pick went to the Ottawa Senators as the result of a trade on June 28, 2014, that sent a sixth-round pick in 2015 to Winnipeg in exchange for this pick.

== 2015 Draft picks ==
The 2015 NHL entry draft was held in Sunrise, Florida on June 26–27, 2015. Ottawa made the following picks:

Round	Overall	Player	Position	Nationality	Club team
1	18	Thomas Chabot	Defence	Canada	Saint John Sea Dogs (QMJHL)
1	21 (from NYI via Buffalo)	Colin White	Centre	United States	U.S. National Team Development Program (USHL)
2	36 (from New Jersey)	Gabriel Gagne	Right wing	Canada	Victoriaville Tigres (QMJHL)
2	48	Filip Chlapik	Centre	Czech Republic	Charlottetown Islanders (QMJHL)
4	107 (from Pittsburgh via Edmonton)	Christian Wolanin	Defence	United States	Muskegon Lumberjacks (USHL)
4	109	Filip Ahl	Left wing	Sweden	HV71 (J20 SuperElit)
5	139	Christian Jaros	Defence	Slovakia	Lulea HF (J20 SuperElit)
7	199	Joey Daccord	Goalie	United States	Cushing Academy (USHS)

=== 2015 Draft transactions ===
1. The New York Islanders' first-round pick went to the Ottawa Senators as the result of a trade on June 26, 2015 that sent Robin Lehner and David Legwand to Buffalo in exchange for this pick. Buffalo previously acquired this pick as the result of a trade on October 27, 2013 that sent Thomas Vanek to New York in exchange for Matt Moulson, a second-round pick in 2015 and this pick (being conditional at the time of the trade). The condition – Buffalo will receive a first-round pick in 2014 or 2015 at New York's choice – was converted on May 22, 2014 when the Islanders elected to keep their 2014 first-round pick.
2. The New Jersey Devils’ second-round pick went to the Ottawa Senators as the result of a trade on June 27, 2015 that sent Dallas’ second-round pick in 2015 (42nd overall) and a conditional fourth-round pick in 2015 or 2016 to New Jersey in exchange for this pick.
3. The Ottawa Senators' third-round pick went to the New York Rangers as the result of a trade on June 27, 2015 that sent Cam Talbot and a seventh-round pick in 2015 (209th overall) to Edmonton in exchange for Montreal's second-round pick in 2015 (57th overall), a seventh-round pick in 2015 (184th overall) and this pick. Edmonton previously acquired this pick as the result of a trade on March 5, 2014 that sent Ales Hemsky to Ottawa in exchange for a fifth-round pick in 2014 and this pick.
4. The Pittsburgh Penguins' fourth-round pick went to the Ottawa Senators as the result of a trade on June 27, 2015 that sent Eric Gryba to Edmonton in exchange for Travis Ewanyk and this pick.
5. The Ottawa Senators' sixth-round pick went to the Carolina Hurricanes as the result of a trade on December 18, 2014 that sent Jay Harrison to Winnipeg in exchange for this pick. Winnipeg previously acquired this pick as the result of a trade on June 28, 2014 that sent a seventh-round pick in 2014 to Ottawa in exchange for this pick.

== 2016 Draft picks ==
The 2016 NHL entry draft was held in Buffalo, New York, on June 24–25, 2016. Ottawa made the following picks:

Round	Overall	Player	Position	Nationality	Club team
1	11 (from New Jersey)	Logan Brown	Centre	United States	Windsor Spitfires (OHL)
2	42	Jonathan Dahlen	Left wing	Sweden	Timra IK (Allsvenskan)
4	103	Todd Burgess	Right wing	United States	Fairbanks Ice Dogs (NAHL)
5	133	Maxime Lajoie	Defence	Canada	Swift Current Broncos (WHL)
6	163	Markus Nurmi	Right wing	Finland	TPS (Jr. A Liiga)

=== 2016 Draft transactions ===
- The New Jersey Devils' first-round pick (#11 overall) went to the Ottawa Senators as a result of trade that was made on June 25, 2016 that sent Ottawa's first-round pick (#12 overall) and a conditional third-round pick (#80 overall) to the Devils.
- The Ottawa Senators' seventh-round pick went to the New York Islanders as part of a trade that saw Shane Prince being traded to the Islanders on February 29, 2016.

== 2017 Draft picks ==
The 2017 NHL entry draft was held in Chicago, Illinois on June 23–24, 2017. Ottawa made the following picks:

Round	Overall	Player	Position	Nationality	Club team
1	28	Shane Bowers	Centre	Canada	Waterloo Black Hawks (USHL)
2	47 (from Calgary)	Alex Formenton	Left wing	Canada	London Knights (OHL)
4	121	Drake Batherson	Centre	Canada	Cape Breton Screaming Eagles (QMJHL)
6	183	Jordan Hollett	Goalie	Canada	Medicine Hat Tigers (WHL)

=== 2017 Draft transactions ===
- The Calgary Flames' second-round pick (#47 overall) went to the Ottawa Senators as the result of a trade on March 1, 2017, that sent Curtis Lazar and Mike Kostka to Calgary in exchange for Jyrki Jokipakka and this pick.
- The Senators' second-round pick went the Toronto Maple Leafs as the result of a trade on February 9, 2016, that sent Dion Phaneuf, Matt Frattin, Casey Bailey, Ryan Rupert and Cody Donaghey to Ottawa in exchange for Milan Michalek, Jared Cowen, Colin Greening, Tobias Lindberg and this pick.
- The Senators' third-round pick went to the Chicago Blackhawks as the result of a trade on April 28, 2017, that sent Scott Darling to Carolina in exchange for this pick. Carolina previously acquired this pick as the result of a trade on February 28, 2017, that sent Viktor Stalberg to Ottawa in exchange for this pick.
- The Senators' fifth-round pick went to the Pittsburgh Penguins as the result of a trade on November 2, 2016, that Mike Condon to Ottawa exchange for this pick.
- The Senators' seventh-round pick went to the New Jersey Devils as the result of a trade on June 24, 2017, that sent Nashville's sixth-round pick in 2017 (185th overall) to San Jose in exchange for a seventh-round pick in 2017 (205th overall) and this pick. San Jose previously acquired this pick as the result of a trade on January 24, 2017, that sent Tommy Wingels to Ottawa in exchange for Buddy Robinson, Zack Stortini and this pick.

== 2018 Draft picks ==
The 2018 NHL entry draft was held in Dallas, Texas, on June 22–23, 2018. Ottawa made the following picks:

Round	Overall	Player	Position	Nationality	Club team
1	4	Brady Tkachuk	Left wing	United States	Boston University (HE)
1	26 (from Boston via NYR)	Jacob Bernard-Docker	Defence	Canada	Okotoks Oilers (AJHL)
2	48 (from New Jersey via NYR)	Jonny Tychonick	Defence	Canada	Penticton Vees (BCHL)
4	95	Jonathan Gruden	Left wing	United States	U.S. National Team Development Program (USHL)
5	126	Angus Crookshank	Left wing	Canada	Langley Rivermen (BCHL)
6	157	Kevin Mandolese	Goalie	Canada	Cape Breton Screaming Eagles (QMJHL)
7	188	Jakov Novak	Left wing/Centre	Canada	Janesville Jets (NAHL)
7	194 (from NYR)	Luke Loheit	Right wing	United States	Minnetonka High School (USHS)

=== 2018 Draft transactions ===
- The Pittsburgh Penguins' first-round pick went to the Ottawa Senators as the result of a trade on February 23, 2018, that sent Derick Brassard and Ottawa's 2018 third-round pick to Pittsburgh in exchange for Ian Cole, Filip Gustavsson, Pittsburgh's third-round pick in 2019 and this pick.
- The Senators' second-round pick went to the New York Rangers as the result of a trade on July 18, 2016, that sent Derick Brassard and New York's seventh-round pick in 2018 to Ottawa in exchange for Mika Zibanejad and this pick.

== 2019 Draft picks ==
The 2019 NHL entry draft was held in Vancouver, British Columbia, on June 21–22, 2019. Ottawa made the following picks:

Round	Overall	Player	Position	Nationality	Club team
1	19 (from Columbus)	Lassi Thomson	Defence	Finland	Kelowna Rockets (WHL)
2	32	Shane Pinto	Centre	United States	Tri-City Storm (USHL)
2	37 (from NYR via CAR)	Mads Sogaard	Goalie	Denmark	Medicine Hat Tigers (WHL)
4	94	Viktor Lodin	Centre	Sweden	Orebro HK (SHL)
5	125	Mark Kastelic	Centre	United States	Calgary Hitmen (WHL)
7	187	Maxence Guenette	Defence	Canada	Val-d'Or Foreurs (QMJHL)

=== 2019 Draft transactions ===
- The Senators' first-round pick went to the Colorado Avalanche as the result of a trade on November 5, 2017 that sent Matt Duchene to Ottawa in exchange for Kyle Turris, Shane Bowers, Andrew Hammond, a third-round pick in 2019 and this pick (being conditional at the time of the trade). The condition – Colorado will receive a first-round pick in 2019 if the Senators' first-round pick in 2018 is inside the top ten selections and the Senators decide to defer the pick to 2019 – was converted on June 22, 2018.
- The Columbus Blue Jackets' first-round pick went to the Senators as the result of a trade on February 22, 2019 that sent Matt Duchene and Julius Bergman to Columbus in exchange for Vitalii Abramov, Jonathan Davidsson, a conditional first-round pick in 2020 and this pick (being conditional at the time of the trade). The condition – Ottawa will receive a first-round pick in 2019 if the Blue Jackets' first-round pick is outside of the top three selections in the 2019 NHL entry draft – was converted when the Blue Jackets clinched a spot in the 2019 Stanley Cup playoffs on April 5, 2019.
- The Florida Panthers' second-round pick went to the Senators as the result of a trade on September 13, 2018 that sent Erik Karlsson and Francis Perron to San Jose in exchange for Chris Tierney, Dylan DeMelo, Josh Norris, Rudolfs Balcers, a conditional first-round pick in 2019 or 2020, a conditional first-round pick in 2021, a conditional first-round pick no later than 2022 and this pick (being conditional at the time of the trade). The condition – Ottawa will receive the higher of Florida or San Jose's second-round pick in 2019. – was converted on March 26, 2019 when Florida was eliminated from the 2019 Stanley Cup playoffs ensuring that Florida would select higher than San Jose.
- The Senators' third-round pick went to the Colorado Avalanche as the result of a trade on November 5, 2017 that sent Matt Duchene to Ottawa in exchange for Kyle Turris, Shane Bowers, Andrew Hammond, a conditional first-round pick in 2018 and this pick.
- The Pittsburgh Penguins' third-round pick went to the Senators as the result of a trade on February 23, 2018 that sent Derick Brassard to Vegas in exchange for this pick.

== 2020 Draft picks ==
The 2020 NHL entry draft was held via the Internet on October 6–7, 2020. Ottawa made the following ten picks:

Round	Overall	Player	Position	Nationality	Club team
1	3 (from San Jose)	Tim Stutzle	Centre/Left Wing	Germany	Adler Mannheim (DEL)
1	5	Jake Sanderson	Defence	United States	University of North Dakota (NCHC)
1	28 (from NYI)	Ridly Greig	Centre	Canada	Brandon Wheat Kings (WHL)
2	33	Roby Jarventie	Left wing	Finland	Ilves (Liiga)
2	44 (from Toronto)	Tyler Kleven	Defence	United States	University of North Dakota (NCHC)
2	61 (from Dallas via VGK)	Egor Sokolov	Left wing	Russia	Cape Breton Eagles (QMJHL)
3	71 (from Winnipeg)	Leevi Meriläinen	Goalie	Finland	Oulun Karpat (Jr. A)
5	155 (from Tampa Bay)	Eric Engstrand	Left wing	Sweden	Malmo Redhawks (SHL)
6	158 (from San Jose)	Philippe Daoust	Left wing	Canada	Moncton Wildcats (QMJHL)
6	181 (from St. Louis via EDM)	Cole Reinhardt	Left wing	Canada	Brandon Wheat Kings (WHL)

=== 2020 Draft transactions ===
- The San Jose Sharks' first-round pick went to the Senators as the result of a trade on September 13, 2018 that sent Erik Karlsson and Francis Perron to San Jose in exchange for Chris Tierney, Dylan DeMelo, Josh Norris, Rudolfs Balcers, a conditional second-round pick in 2019, a conditional first-round pick in 2021, a conditional first-round pick no later than 2022 and this pick (being conditional at the time of the trade). The condition – Ottawa will receive a first-round pick in 2020 if San Jose qualifies for the 2019 Stanley Cup playoffs – was converted on March 19, 2019.
- The New York Islanders' first-round pick went to the Senators as the result of a trade on February 24, 2020 that sent Jean-Gabriel Pageau to New York in exchange for a second-round pick in 2020, a conditional third-round pick in 2022 and this pick (being conditional at the time of the trade). The condition – Ottawa will receive a first-round pick in 2020 if New York's first-round pick is outside the top three selections – was converted when the Islanders advanced to the First Round of the 2020 Stanley Cup playoffs on August 7, 2020.
- The Toronto Maple Leafs' second-round pick went to the Senators as the result of a trade on October 7, 2020 that sent the Islanders' second-round pick and a third-round pick both in 2020 (59th and 64th overall) to Toronto in exchange for this pick.
- The Dallas Stars' second-round pick went to the Senators as the result of a trade on February 25, 2019 that sent Mark Stone and Tobias Lindberg to Vegas in exchange for Erik Brannstrom, Oscar Lindberg and this pick. Vegas previously acquired this pick as the result of a trade on June 26, 2017 that sent Marc Methot to Dallas in exchange for Dylan Ferguson and this pick.
- The Senators' third-round pick went to the Toronto Maple Leafs as the result of a trade on October 7, 2020 that sent a second-round pick in 2020 (44th overall) to Ottawa in exchange for the Islanders' second-round pick in 2020 (59th overall) and this pick.
- The Winnipeg Jets' third-round pick went to the Senators as the result of a trade on February 18, 2020 that sent Dylan DeMelo to Winnipeg in exchange for this pick.
- The Senators' fourth-round pick went to the Florida Panthers as the result of a trade on October 2, 2020 that sent Josh Brown to Ottawa in exchange for this pick.
- The Senators' fifth-round pick went to the Edmonton Oilers as the result of a trade on October 7, 2020 that sent a third-round pick in 2020 (76th overall) to San Jose in exchange for Buffalo's fourth-round pick in 2020 (100th overall) and this pick. San Jose previously acquired this pick as the result of a trade on June 19, 2018 that sent Mikkel Boedker, Julius Bergman and a sixth-round pick in 2020 to Ottawa in exchange for Mike Hoffman, Cody Donaghey and this pick.
- The Tampa Bay Lightning's fifth-round pick went to the Senators as the result of a trade on July 30, 2019 that sent Mike Condon and a sixth-round pick in 2020 to Tampa Bay in exchange for Ryan Callahan and this pick.
- The Senators' sixth-round pick went to the Tampa Bay Lightning as the result of a trade on July 30, 2019 that sent Ryan Callahan and a fifth-round pick in 2020 to Ottawa in exchange for Mike Condon and this pick.
- The San Jose Sharks' sixth-round pick went to the Senators as the result of a trade on June 19, 2018 that sent Mike Hoffman, Cody Donaghey and a fifth-round pick in 2020 to San Jose in exchange for Mikkel Boedker, Julius Bergman and this pick.
- The St. Louis Blues' sixth-round pick went to the Senators as the result of a trade on November 22, 2018 that sent Chris Wideman to Edmonton in exchange for this pick. Edmonton previously acquired this pick in a trade on October 1, 2018 that sent Jakub Jerabek to St. Louis in exchange for this pick (being conditional at the time of the trade). The condition – Edmonton will receive a sixth-round pick in 2020 if Jerabek plays in less than 50 games during the 2018–19 NHL season – was converted on December 22, 2018.
- The Senators' seventh-round pick went to the Chicago Blackhawks as the result of a trade on October 7, 2020 that sent Montreal's seventh-round pick in 2021 to Montreal in exchange for this pick. Montreal previously acquired this pick as the result of a trade on February 24, 2020 that sent Matthew Peca to Ottawa in exchange for Aaron Luchuk and this pick.

== 2021 Draft picks ==
The 2021 NHL entry draft was held electronically on July 23–24, 2021. Ottawa made the following picks:

Round	Overall	Player	Position	Nationality	Club team
1	10	Tyler Boucher	Right wing	United States	U.S. National Team Development Program (USHL)
2	39 (from San Jose)	Zack Ostapchuk	Centre	Canada	Vancouver Giants (WHL)
2	49 (from St. Louis via BUF, VGK, and LAK)	Benjamin Roger	Defence	Canada	London Knights (OHL)
3	74	Oliver Johansson	Left wing	Sweden	Timra IK (HockeyAllsvenskan)
4	123 (from Carolina)	Carson Latimer	Right wing	Canada	Edmonton Oil Kings (WHL)
7	202	Chandler Romeo	Defence	Canada	Brantford Bandits (GOJHL)

=== Transactions ===
1. The San Jose Sharks' second-round pick went to the Senators as the result of a trade on September 13, 2018, that sent Erik Karlsson and Francis Perron to San Jose in exchange for Chris Tierney, Dylan DeMelo, Josh Norris, Rudolfs Balcers, a conditional second-round pick in 2019, a conditional l first-round pick in 2019 or 2020, a conditional first-round pick no later than 2022, and this pick (being conditional at the time of the trade). The condition – Ottawa will receive a second-round pick in 2021 if Karlsson re-signs with the Sharks for the 2019–20 NHL season and the Sharks do not make the 2019 Stanley Cup Finals – was converted on June 17, 2019, when Karlsson re-signed with San Jose for the 2019–20 NHL season.
2. The Senators' second-round pick went to the Los Angeles Kings as the result of a trade on July 24, 2021, that sent St. Louis' second-round pick and a fifth-round pick both in 2021 (49th and 136th overall) to Ottawa in exchange for this pick.
3. The St. Louis Blues' second-round pick went to the Senators as the result of a trade on July 24, 2021, that sent a second-round pick in 2021 (42nd overall) to Los Angeles in exchange for a fifth-round pick in 2021 (136th overall) and this pick.
4. The Senators' fourth-round pick went to the New York Rangers as the result of a trade on October 7, 2019, that sent Vladislav Namestnikov to Ottawa in exchange for Nick Ebert and this pick.
5. The Carolina Hurricanes' fourth-round pick went to the Senators as the result of a trade on July 24, 2021, that sent Los Angeles' fifth-round pick and a sixth-round pick both in 2021 (136th and 170th overall) to Carolina in exchange for this pick.
6. The Senators' fifth-round pick went to the Dallas Stars as the result of a trade on July 23, 2021, that sent a first-round pick in 2021 (15th overall) to Detroit in exchange for Washington's first-round pick and the Rangers' second-round pick both in 2021 (23rd and 48th overall) and this pick.
  Detroit previously acquired this pick as the result of a trade on April 11, 2021, that sent Jon Merrill to Montreal in exchange for Hayden Verbeek and this pick.
  Montreal previously acquired this pick as the result of a trade on January 2, 2020, that sent Mike Reilly to Ottawa in exchange for Andrew Sturtz and this pick.
7. The Senators' sixth-round pick went to the Carolina Hurricanes as the result of a trade on July 24, 2021, that sent a fourth-round pick in 2021 (123rd overall) to Ottawa in exchange for Los Angeles' fifth-round pick in 2021 (136th overall) and this pick.

== 2022 Draft picks ==
The 2022 NHL entry draft was held July 7–8, 2022 at the Bell Centre arena in Montreal, Quebec. The Senators traded their first-round pick and second-round pick to acquire Alex DeBrincat. The Senators' top pick was made in the second round - defenceman Filip Nordberg with the 64th-overall pick. The team had nine selections overall.

Round	Overall	Player	Position	Nationality	Club team
2	64 (from Tampa Bay)	Filip Nordberg	Defence	Sweden	Sodertalje SK (HockeyAllsvenskan)
3	72	Oskar Pettersson	Right wing	Sweden	Rogle J20 (J20 Nationell)
3	87 (from Boston)	Tomas Hamara	Defence	Czechia	Tappara U20 (U20 SM-sarja)
4	104	Stephen Halliday	Centre	Canada	Dubuque Fighting Saints (USHL)
5	136	Jorian Donovan	Defence	Canada	Hamilton Bulldogs (OHL)
5	143 (from Winnipeg)	Cameron O'Neill	Right wing	United States	Mount St. Charles Academy (NEPACK 18U)
5	151 (from Boston)	Kevin Reidler	Goaltender	Sweden	AIK J18 (J20 Nationell)
6	168	Theo Wallberg	Defence	Sweden	Skelleftea AIK J20 (J20 Nationell)
7	206 (from NY Islanders)	Tyson Dyck	Centre	Canada	Cranbrook Bucks (BCHL)

=== Transactions ===
1. The Senators' first-round and second-round picks went to the Chicago Blackhawks as the result of a trade on July 7, 2022, that sent Alex DeBrincat to Ottawa in exchange for a third-round pick in 2024 and these picks.
2. The Tampa Bay Lightning's second-round pick went to the Senators as the result of a trade on December 27, 2020, that sent Marian Gaborik and Anders Nilsson to Tampa Bay in exchange for Braydon Coburn, Cedric Paquette and this pick.
1. The Boston Bruins' third-round pick went to the Senators as the result of a trade on April 11, 2021, that sent Mike Reilly to Boston in exchange for this pick.
1. The Winnipeg Jets' fifth-round pick went to the Senators as the result of a trade on March 21, 2022, that sent Zach Sanford to Winnipeg in exchange for this pick.
2. The Boston Bruins' fifth-round pick went to the Senators as the result of a trade on March 21, 2022, that sent Josh Brown and a conditional seventh-round pick in 2022 to Boston in exchange for Zach Senyshyn and this pick.
1. The Senators' seventh-round pick went to the Boston Bruins as the result of a trade on March 21, 2022, that sent Zach Senyshyn and a fifth-round pick in 2022 to Ottawa in exchange for Josh Brown and this pick (being conditional at the time of the trade). The condition – Boston will receive a seventh-round pick in 2022 if Senyshyn plays in fewer than five games for the Senators before the conclusion of the 2021–22 NHL season – was converted when it was no longer possible for Senyshyn to play in five games for Ottawa in the 2021–22 season on April 26, 2022.
2. The New York Islanders' seventh-round pick went to the Ottawa Senators as the result of a trade on April 11, 2021, that sent Braydon Coburn to New York in exchange for this pick.

== 2023 Draft picks ==
The 2023 NHL entry draft was held in Nashville, Tennessee, on June 28–29, 2023. Ottawa made the following picks:

Round	Overall	Player	Position	Nationality	Club team
4	108	Hoyt Stanley	Defence	Canada	Victoria Grizzlies (BCHL)
5	140	Matthew Andonovski	Defence	Canada	Kitchener Rangers (OHL)
7	204	Owen Beckner	Centre	Canada	Salmon Arm Silverbacks (BCHL)
7	207 (from Nashville)	Vladimir Nikitin	Goalie	Kazakhstan	Snezhnye Barsy (KHC)
7	215 (from NYR)	Nicholas Vantassell	Centre	United States	Green Bay Gamblers (USHL)

=== Transactions ===
1. The Senators' first-round pick went to the Arizona Coyotes as the result of a trade on March 1, 2023, that sent Jakob Chychrun to Ottawa in exchange for Washington's conditional second-round pick in 2024, a second-round pick in 2026 and this pick (being conditional at the time of the trade). The condition – Arizona will receive a first-round pick in 2023 if Ottawa's first-round pick in 2023 is outside of the top five selections – was converted when Ottawa did not win either draw in the 2023 NHL Draft Lottery on May 8, 2023.
2. The Senators' second-round pick went to the Chicago Blackhawks as the result of a trade on February 22, 2023, that sent future considerations to Ottawa in exchange for Nikita Zaitsev, a fourth-round pick in 2026 and this pick.
3. The Senators' third-round pick went to the St. Louis Blues as the result of a trade on February 17, 2023, that sent Noel Acciari and Josh Pillar to Toronto in exchange for Adam Gaudette, Mikhail Abramov, a first-round pick in 2023, a second-round pick in 2024 and this pick.
  Toronto previously acquired this pick as the result of a trade on July 11, 2022, that sent future considerations to Ottawa in exchange for Matt Murray, a seventh-round pick in 2024 and this pick.
4. The Senators' sixth-round pick went to the Philadelphia Flyers as the result of a trade on March 3, 2023, that sent Patrick Brown to Ottawa in exchange for this pick.
5. The Nashville Predators' seventh-round pick went to the Senators as a result of a trade on April 12, 2021, that sent Erik Gudbranson to Nashville in exchange for Brandon Fortunato and this pick.
6. The New York Rangers' seventh-round pick went to the Senators as the result of a trade on February 19, 2023, that sent Tyler Motte to New York in exchange for Julien Gauthier and this pick (being conditional at the time of the trade). The condition – Ottawa will receive a seventh-round pick in 2023 if the Rangers do not advance to the Second Round of the 2023 Stanley Cup playoffs – was converted on May 1, 2023.

== 2024 Draft picks ==
The 2024 NHL entry draft was held in Las Vegas, Nevada, on June 28–29, 2024. Ottawa chose the following players:

Round	Overall	Player	Position	Nationality	Club team
1	7	Carter Yakemchuk	Defence	Canada	Calgary Hitmen (WHL)
2	39	Gabriel Eliasson	Defence	Sweden	HV71 J20 (J20 Nationell)
4	104	Luke Ellinas	Centre	Canada	Kitchener Rangers (OHL)
4	112 (from Detroit)	Javon Moore	Left wing	United States	Minnetonka High School (USHS-MN)
4	117 (from Tampa Bay)	Blake Montgomery	Left wing	United States	Lincoln Stars (USHL)
5	136	Eerik Wallenius	Defence	Finland	HPK (Liiga)

=== Transactions ===
1. The Senators' third-round pick went to the Chicago Blackhawks as the result of a trade on July 7, 2022, that sent Alex DeBrincat to Ottawa in exchange for a first and second-round pick in 2022 and this pick.
2. The Senators' sixth-round pick went to the Carolina Hurricanes as the result of a trade on March 15, 2024, that sent Jamieson Rees to Ottawa in exchange for this pick.
3. The Senators' seventh-round pick went to the Toronto Maple Leafs as the result of a trade on July 11, 2022, that sent future considerations to Ottawa in exchange for Matt Murray, a third-round pick in 2023 and this pick.
4. The Detroit Red Wings' fourth-round pick went to the Senators as the result of a trade on July 9, 2023, that sent Alex DeBrincat to Detroit in exchange for Dominik Kubalik, Donovan Sebrango, a conditional first-round pick in 2024 and this pick.
5. The Tampa Bay Lightning's fourth-round pick went to the Senators as the result of a trade on March 20, 2022, that sent Nick Paul to Tampa Bay in exchange for Mathieu Joseph and this pick.

== 2025 Draft picks ==
The 2025 NHL entry draft is being held in Los Angeles, California, on June 27–28, 2025. Ottawa chose the following players:

Round	Overall	Player	Position	Nationality	Club team
1	23 (from Nashville)	Logan Hensler	Defence	United States	Wisconsin Badgers (B1G)
3	93 (from Carolina via WSH)	Blake Vanek	Forward	United States	Stillwater High School (USHS-MN)
4	97 (from San Jose)	Lucas Beckman	Goalie	Canada	Baie-Comeau Drakkar (QMJHL)
5	149	Dmitri Isayev	Left Wing	Russia	Avtomobilist Yekaterinburg Jr. (MHL)
6	181	Bruno Idzan	Left Wing	Croatia	Lincoln Stars (USHL)
7	213	Andrei Trofimov	Goalie	Russia	Stalnye Lisy (MHL)

=== Transactions ===
1. The Nashville Predators acquired the Senators' 21st overall pick for the 23rd overall pick and a third round pick (67th overall) in this draft.
2. The Los Angeles Kings traded for the Senators' third-round pick (67th overall), which had been previously acquired earlier in the draft from the Nashville Predators, and a 2026 sixth-round pick previously acquired from the Colorado Avalanche for Jordan Spence.
3. The Senators acquired the 93rd overall pick from the Washington Capitals (previously acquired from the Carolina Hurricanes) in exchange for Ottawa's 96th overall pick (previously acquired from the Florida Panthers) and a seventh-round pick in 2027.
4. The Senators acquired their fourth-round pick (97th overall) from the San Jose Sharks along with Fabian Zetterlund and Tristen Robins on March 7, 2025, in exchange for Noah Gregor, Zack Ostapchuk, and Ottawa's second-round pick (53rd overall) in the 2025 entry draft.

== 2026 Draft picks ==
The 2026 NHL entry draft is being held in Buffalo, New York, on June 26–27, 2026. Ottawa chose the following players:

Round	Overall	Player	Position	Nationality	Club team
1	25 (from Tampa Bay via SEA and FLA)	Jonas Lagerberg Hoen	Right Wing	Sweden	Leksands IF (SHL)
1	32	Jaxon Cover	Left Wing	Cayman Islands	London Knights (OHL)
3	72 (from Florida)	Adam Nemec	Left Wing	Slovakia	Sudbury Wolves (OHL)
3	87	Oscar Holmertz	Centre	Sweden	Linköping HC (SHL)
3	91 (from Dallas via CAR and LAK)	Louis-Felix Bourque	Right Wing	Canada	Drummondville Voltigeurs (QMJHL)
4	110 (from Columbus via DET)	Elliot Lennon	Goalie	Canada	Madison Capitals (USHL)
5	151	Harris Pangretitsch	Defence	Canada	Sault Ste. Marie Greyhounds (OHL)
6	183	Alexander Grunin	Defence	Russia	Sibirskie Snaipery (MHL)
