= Tyler Boucher =

American ice hockey player (born 2003)

- Born: January 16, 2003 (age 23) Scottsdale, Arizona, U.S.
- Height: 6 ft 1 in (185 cm)
- Weight: 205 lb (93 kg; 14 st 9 lb)
- Position: Winger
- Shoots: Right
- NHL team: Ottawa Senators
- NHL draft: 10th overall, 2021; Ottawa Senators
- Playing career: 2023–present

Tyler Boucher (born January 16, 2003) is an American professional ice hockey player who is a winger for the Ottawa Senators of the National Hockey League (NHL). Boucher was drafted in the first round, tenth overall, by the Senators in the 2021 NHL entry draft.

== Playing career ==
=== Amateur ===
Boucher began his junior hockey career with the USA Hockey National Team Development Program's National Under-17 team playing in the United States Hockey League (USHL) in the 2019–20 season, appearing in 24 games, scoring four goals, seven assists for 11 points before the season was canceled due to the COVID-19 pandemic on March 18, 2020. He returned to the Development Program playing in the USHL for the 2020–21 season, but he suffered two knee injuries and a bout with COVID-19 that cut his playing time down to five games. He recorded three goals and five points. During the season, he committed to play college hockey for the Boston University Terriers of the National Collegiate Athletic Association (NCAA) Division I's Hockey East conference.

After beginning the 2021–22 season with the Terriers, collecting two goals and three points through 17 games, he signed a professional contract. No longer eligible to continue with any team in the NCAA after losing his amateur status, Boucher joined the major junior Ottawa 67's of the Ontario Hockey League (OHL) to continue his development. He was originally drafted by the 67's in the 2019 OHL Priority Selection 143rd overall. In 24 games with the 67's, Boucher scored seven goals and 14 points in the regular season. The 67's qualified for the playoffs and faced the North Bay Battalion in the first round. However, their playoff run was short-lived as the Battalion swept the 67's in four games in their best-of-seven series. Boucher added one goal and two points in the four games. For the 2022–23 season, Boucher returned to play with the 67's. His season was cut short in March after a shoulder injury sidelined him that he suffered while playing with the United States men's national junior ice hockey team. In 21 games with the 67's, Boucher scored ten goals and 18 points.

=== Professional ===
Boucher was selected by the Ottawa Senators of the National Hockey League (NHL) in the first round, tenth overall, of the 2021 NHL entry draft. He was selected much earlier than his NHL Central Scouting draft ranking, which was 25th overall among North American skaters. Although committed to college, having suffered a bout of COVID-19 and an injury during the season, the Senators ranked him highly due to his "hard-nosed style" and similarity to NHL forward Tom Wilson.

Boucher signed a three-year, entry-level contract with Ottawa on December 28, 2021. After two seasons in junior, he joined the Senators organization for the 2023–24 season but failed to play in training camp due to a groin injury. He was assigned to Ottawa's American Hockey League (AHL) affiliate, the Belleville Senators in October. Boucher remained with Belleville for the entire season, his season cut short by two injuries. He made 21 appearances for Belleville, tallying two goals and five points. He was assigned to Belleville to start the 2024–25 season. He made 47 appearances with Belleville, scoring five goals and 10 points. However, his season was cut short again by injury, suffering one to his leg in a game against the Wilkes-Barre/Scranton Penguins in January 2025 when one of the Penguins fell on him. He was assigned to Belleville to start the 2025–26 season. He made only 47 appearances with Belleville, tallying 12 goals and 26 points. He missed a large chunk of time at the beginning of the season with an upper body injury, but after returning, recorded 20 points in Belleville's final 35 games. After Belleville was eliminated from AHL post-season contention, he was recalled by Ottawa on April 19, 2026, but saw no playing time.

In the 2026 off-season, he signed a one-year, two-way contract with Ottawa on July 10. No longer waivers-exempt, he was placed on waivers by the Senators at the end of training camp and after going unclaimed, was assigned to Belleville to start the 2026–27 season. On November 17, he was called up by Ottawa to play his first NHL game against the Winnipeg Jets. In the second period, he scored his first NHL goal on an assist from Thomas Chabot.

== International play ==
Medal record

Representing United States

Ice hockey

World Junior Championships
Bronze medal – third place	2023 Canada	

On December 12, 2022, Boucher was named to the United States men's national junior ice hockey team to compete at the 2023 World Junior Ice Hockey Championships. During the tournament, he recorded three goals and one assist in six games, helping the US team to a bronze medal. He suffered a torn labrum in his right shoulder, prematurely ending his participation in the tournament.

== Personal life ==
Boucher is the son of Philadelphia Flyers' broadcaster and former goaltender, Brian Boucher. He was born on January 16, 2003, in Scottsdale, Arizona while his father was playing for the Phoenix Coyotes. According to Tyler, he chose not to get into goaltending because "I don't think my mom (Melissa Boucher) could handle that one again. She had enough trauma with my dad."

To attend his first game in Winnipeg, his parents had to travel by car to Montreal from Philadelphia due to a US air traffic control system failure. His sister Brianna flew from Boston to Montreal to meet them. They then boarded an early flight from Montreal to Winnipeg, arriving in the afternoon of the game.

== Career statistics ==
=== Regular season and playoffs ===
			Regular season					Playoffs
Season	Team	League	GP	G	A	Pts	PIM	GP	G	A	Pts	PIM
2018–19	Avon Old Farms	USHS	26	9	14	23	—	—	—	—	—	—
2019–20	U.S. National Development Team	USHL	24	4	7	11	47	—	—	—	—	—
2020–21	U.S. National Development Team	USHL	5	3	2	5	13	—	—	—	—	—
2021–22	Boston University	HE	17	2	1	3	34	—	—	—	—	—
2021–22	Ottawa 67's	OHL	24	7	7	14	22	4	1	1	2	6
2022–23	Ottawa 67's	OHL	21	10	7	17	32	—	—	—	—	—
2023–24	Belleville Senators	AHL	21	2	3	5	34	—	—	—	—	—
2024–25	Belleville Senators	AHL	47	5	5	10	34	—	—	—	—	—
2025–26	Belleville Senators	AHL	47	12	14	26	68	—	—	—	—	—
AHL totals			115	19	22	41	136	—	—	—	—	—

=== International ===
Year	Team	Event	Result	GP	G	A	Pts	PIM
2019	United States	U17	2nd place, silver medalist(s)	6	1	3	4	16
2023	United States	WJC	3rd place, bronze medalist(s)	6	3	1	4	8
Junior totals				12	4	4	8	24

Awards and achievements
Preceded by Ridly Greig	Ottawa Senators first-round draft pick 2021	Succeeded by Carter Yakemchuk
