= Ridly Greig =

Canadian ice hockey player (born 2002)

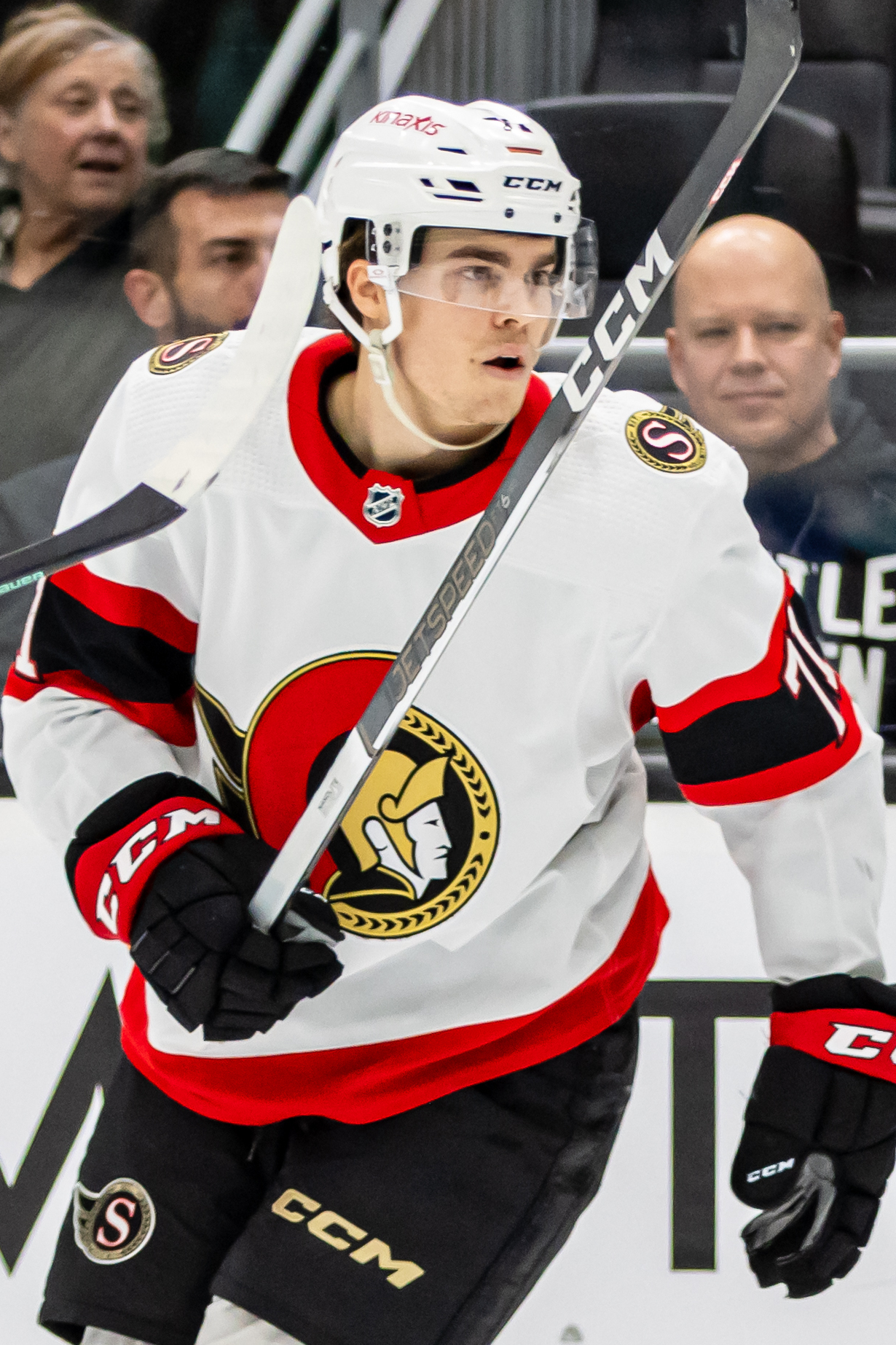
- Greig in 2024
- Born: August 8, 2002 (age 23) Lethbridge, Alberta, Canada
- Height: 6 ft 0 in (183 cm)
- Weight: 184 lb (83 kg; 13 st 2 lb)
- Position: Centre
- Shoots: Left
- NHL team: Ottawa Senators
- National team: Canada
- NHL draft: 28th overall, 2020; Ottawa Senators
- Playing career: 2021–present

Ridly Greig (born August 8, 2002) is a Canadian professional ice hockey player who is a centre for the Ottawa Senators of the National Hockey League (NHL). He was selected by the Senators in the first round of the 2020 NHL entry draft with the 28th overall pick.

== Playing career ==
=== Amateur ===
Greig was selected by the Brandon Wheat Kings of the Western Hockey League (WHL) in the first round, eight overall, of the 2017 WHL bantam draft. In his first season of junior hockey with Brandon, Greig appeared in only four games during the 2017–18 season, marking just one assist. In his second season with Brandon, and his first full one in the WHL in 2018–19, Greig recorded 14 goals and 21 assists for 35 points in 63 games. He returned to Brandon for the COVID-19 pandemic-shortened 2019–20 season, recording 26 goals and 60 points in 54 games before the season was ended prematurely on March 23, 2020 with no playoffs. The following 2020–21 season was again abbreviated by the pandemic, starting on December 4, 2020 limited to just 24 games and no playoffs. Greig appeared in 21 of Brandon's 24 games, scoring 10 goals and 32 points. Ahead of the 2021–22 season, Greig was named the 66th captain in Wheat Kings history. He made 39 appearances with Brandon that season, recording 26 goals and 63 points. The Wheat Kings made the WHL playoffs for the first time in Greig's time with the team. Brandon was eliminated by the Red Deer Rebels in six games in the best-of-seven first round series. Greig added two goals and three points in the series.

=== Professional ===
Greig was selected by the Ottawa Senators of the National Hockey League (NHL) in the first round, 28th overall, of the 2020 NHL entry draft. He signed a three-year, entry-level contract with the Senators on December 30, 2020. In the Ottawa Senators' training camp in 2021, Greig was suspended for two games for an illegal cross-check to the Winnipeg Jets's Pierre-Luc Dubois. He joined Ottawa's American Hockey League (AHL) affiliate, the Belleville Senators, at the end of the 2021–22 season and played in Belleville's Calder Cup playoff loss to the Rochester Americans. He joined Belleville full-time at the beginning of the 2022–23 season. Greig was recalled by Ottawa on January 23, 2023. Greig made his NHL debut on January 25, 2023, in Ottawa against the New York Islanders playing on a line with Alex DeBrincat and Claude Giroux. He registered an assist in the game. On February 19, 2023, Greig scored his first NHL goal against the St. Louis Blues. Greig was assigned to Belleville on February 25, 2023, after playing in 11 games for Ottawa. He was recalled again by Ottawa on March 15, 2023, after Ottawa had lost four straight games. Greig finished the season in Ottawa, recording two goals and nine points in 20 games. He added 15 goals and 29 points in 39 games with Belleville.

He made Ottawa's lineup out of training camp ahead of the 2023–24 season and was expected to add some secondary scoring, grit and toughness to Ottawa's bottom two lines. Early in the season, he missed ten games after suffering a high ankle sprain, returning December 4, playing on the third line with Dominik Kubalík and Mathieu Joseph. On January 16, 2024, he scored two goals in a 7–4 loss to the Colorado Avalanche. On February 10, in a 5–3 victory over the Toronto Maple Leafs, Greig used a slapshot to score a goal on an empty net very late in the game, a play Maple Leafs' defenceman Morgan Rielly took issue with and skated over and cross-checked Grieg in the face. Grieg was not seriously injured in the interaction, however, this led to Rielly to being suspended by the NHL for five games. He played in 72 games, recording 13 goals and 26 points.

During the Senators training camp ahead of the 2024–25 season, Greig suffered an upper-body injury in an exhibition game with the Toronto Maple Leafs. Then in mid October, he suffered another upper-body injury, forcing him to miss a week of games. He returned to the lineup on October 21 against the Utah Hockey Club. On January 10, 2025, Greig signed a four-year contract extension with Ottawa. In 78 games with Ottawa, he scored 13 goals and 34 points. The Senators qualified for the playoffs and he made his NHL playoff debut on April 20 in game one of their first round series against the Toronto Maple Leafs. He scored his first playoff goal in the game. In the first round, Grieg established himself as a pest, drawing penalties from Maple Leafs' goaltender Anthony Stolarz. However, the Senators were eliminated in six games in their best-of-seven series. In the six games, Grieg tallied just the one goal.

In the 2025–26 season, Greig tallied 13 goals and 35 points in 77 games. The Senators made the playoffs again, but were swept in the first round by the Carolina Hurricanes. Greig registered one assist in the four games. In Game 4 of the series, during a break in play, a scrum took place in which the Hurricanes' Sean Walker and the Senators' Warren Foegele became entangled. Greig took the opportunity to punch Walker, who could not defend himself. Since the Senators had failed to move on in the playoffs, Greig was suspended for two games at the start of the 2026–27 season.

== International play ==
Medal record

Representing Canada

Ice hockey

World Junior Championships
| Gold medal – first place | 2022 Canada | |

Greig was selected for Team Canada's roster for the 2022 World Junior Ice Hockey Championships. He distinguished himself in the early going, being named the team's best player in two of four group-stage games. He then suffered an injury in the first period of the quarter-final game against Team Switzerland, as a result of which he missed the remainder of the tournament, considered a significant loss for the team. However, Greig shared in Team Canada's eventual gold medal win.

Greig accepted an invitation to make his senior national team debut at the 2024 IIHF World Championship. Grieg appeared in five games, as Canada finished fourth in the tournament, losing the bronze medal game to Sweden, 4–2.

== Personal life ==
Greig's father Mark played nine seasons in the National Hockey League (NHL) for the Hartford Whalers, Toronto Maple Leafs, Calgary Flames and Philadelphia Flyers. He has two sisters named Kyra and Dara. Dara is a professional ice hockey player for the Ottawa Charge of the Professional Women's Hockey League (PWHL). She played for the Montreal Victoire before this. Previously she played college ice hockey at Wisconsin and Colgate. His other sister Kyra as of 2019–20 played for the University of Lethbridge in the Canadian U Sports League.

== Career statistics ==
=== Regular season and playoffs ===
| | | | Regular season | | | | | Playoffs |
| Season | Team | League | GP | G | A | Pts | PIM | GP | G | A | Pts | PIM |
|---|---|---|---|---|---|---|---|---|---|---|---|---|
| 2017–18 | Lethbridge Hurricanes Midget AAA | AMHL | 32 | 24 | 30 | 54 | 44 | 12 | 5 | 16 | 21 | 20 |
| 2017–18 | Brandon Wheat Kings | WHL | 4 | 0 | 1 | 1 | 0 | — | — | — | — | — |
| 2018–19 | Brandon Wheat Kings | WHL | 63 | 14 | 21 | 35 | 57 | — | — | — | — | — |
| 2019–20 | Brandon Wheat Kings | WHL | 56 | 26 | 34 | 60 | 83 | — | — | — | — | — |
| 2020–21 | Belleville Senators | AHL | 7 | 1 | 2 | 3 | 2 | — | — | — | — | — |
| 2020–21 | Brandon Wheat Kings | WHL | 21 | 10 | 22 | 32 | 39 | — | — | — | — | — |
| 2021–22 | Brandon Wheat Kings | WHL | 39 | 26 | 37 | 63 | 92 | 6 | 2 | 1 | 3 | 22 |
| 2021–22 | Belleville Senators | AHL | — | — | — | — | — | 1 | 0 | 1 | 1 | 2 |
| 2022–23 | Belleville Senators | AHL | 39 | 15 | 14 | 29 | 46 | — | — | — | — | — |
| 2022–23 | Ottawa Senators | NHL | 20 | 2 | 7 | 9 | 12 | — | — | — | — | — |
| 2023–24 | Ottawa Senators | NHL | 72 | 13 | 13 | 26 | 66 | — | — | — | — | — |
| 2024–25 | Ottawa Senators | NHL | 78 | 13 | 21 | 34 | 60 | 6 | 1 | 0 | 1 | 8 |
| 2025–26 | Ottawa Senators | NHL | 77 | 13 | 22 | 35 | 83 | 4 | 0 | 1 | 1 | 2 |
| NHL totals | | | 247 | 41 | 63 | 104 | 221 | 10 | 1 | 1 | 2 | 10 |

=== International ===
| Year | Team | Event | Result | GP | G | A | Pts | PIM |
|---|---|---|---|---|---|---|---|---|
| 2018 | Canada Red | U17 | 4th | 6 | 0 | 1 | 1 | 14 |
| 2019 | Canada | HG18 | 2nd place, silver medalist(s) | 5 | 2 | 1 | 3 | 4 |
| 2022 | Canada | WJC | 1st place, gold medalist(s) | 5 | 3 | 3 | 6 | 8 |
| 2024 | Canada | WC | 4th | 5 | 0 | 0 | 0 | 2 |
| Junior totals | | | | 16 | 5 | 5 | 10 | 26 |
| Senior totals | | | | 5 | 0 | 0 | 0 | 2 |

Awards and achievements
| Preceded by Jake Sanderson | Ottawa Senators first-round draft pick 2020 | Succeeded by Tyler Boucher |
