= Jonas Lagerberg Hoen =

Swedish ice hockey player (born 2007)

- Born: 24 October 2007 (age 18) Mora, Sweden
- Height: 6 ft 2 in (188 cm)
- Weight: 185 lb (84 kg; 13 st 3 lb)
- Position: Right winger
- Shoots: Right
- SHL team: Leksands IF
- NHL draft: 25th overall, 2026; Ottawa Senators

Jonas Lagerberg Hoen (born 24 October 2007) is a Swedish ice hockey right winger for Leksands IF of the Swedish Hockey League (SHL). He was drafted 25th overall by the Ottawa Senators in the 2026 NHL entry draft.

== Playing career ==
Lagerberg Hoen was a member of the Malungs IF program before joining Leksands IF for the 2022–23 season. He became one of the top junior players for Leksands in the subsequent seasons. He split his first season between the U16 team and the U18 team in the J18 Region, scoring 50 points in 19 games with the former. In 2023–24, Lagerberg Hoen scored 23 points in 22 games in the J18 Region and 7 points in 16 games in the J18 Nationell tournament. Considered "creative [with] a deadly wrist shot" according to CBS Sports, Lagerberg Hoen then played for the U20 team in 2024–25 and had 27 goals and three assists in 38 games.

Lagerberg Hoen tallied 16 points in nine games for the U20 team in 2025–26 and also made two appearances for the Leksands IF "A" team. However, he missed almost all of the season after a knee injury in October 2025 that required ACL surgery. In April 2026, he signed a contract with the Leksands IF "A" team for the 2026–27 season.

The NHL Central Scouting Bureau ranked Lagerberg Hoen as the 19th-best European skater eligible for the 2026 NHL entry draft. He was selected by the Ottawa Senators in the first round, 25th overall, of the draft.

== International play ==
Lagerberg Hoen appeared in five games for Sweden at the 2024 Hlinka Gretzky Cup.

== Personal life ==
Lagerberg Hoen was born on 24 October 2007 in Mora, Sweden. His brother, Lucas, also played professionally for Leksands IF.

== Career statistics ==
=== Regular season and playoffs ===
			Regular season					Playoffs
Season	Team	League	GP	G	A	Pts	PIM	GP	G	A	Pts	PIM
2024–25	Leksands IF	J20	38	27	3	30	18	7	2	3	5	0
2025–26	Leksands IF	J20	9	9	7	16	33	—	—	—	—	—
2025–26	Leksands IF	SHL	2	0	0	0	0	—	—	—	—	—
SHL totals			2	0	0	0	0	—	—	—	—	—

Awards and achievements
Preceded by Logan Hensler	Ottawa Senators first-round draft pick 2026	Succeeded by Jaxon Cover
