= Stefan Noesen =

American ice hockey player (born 1993)

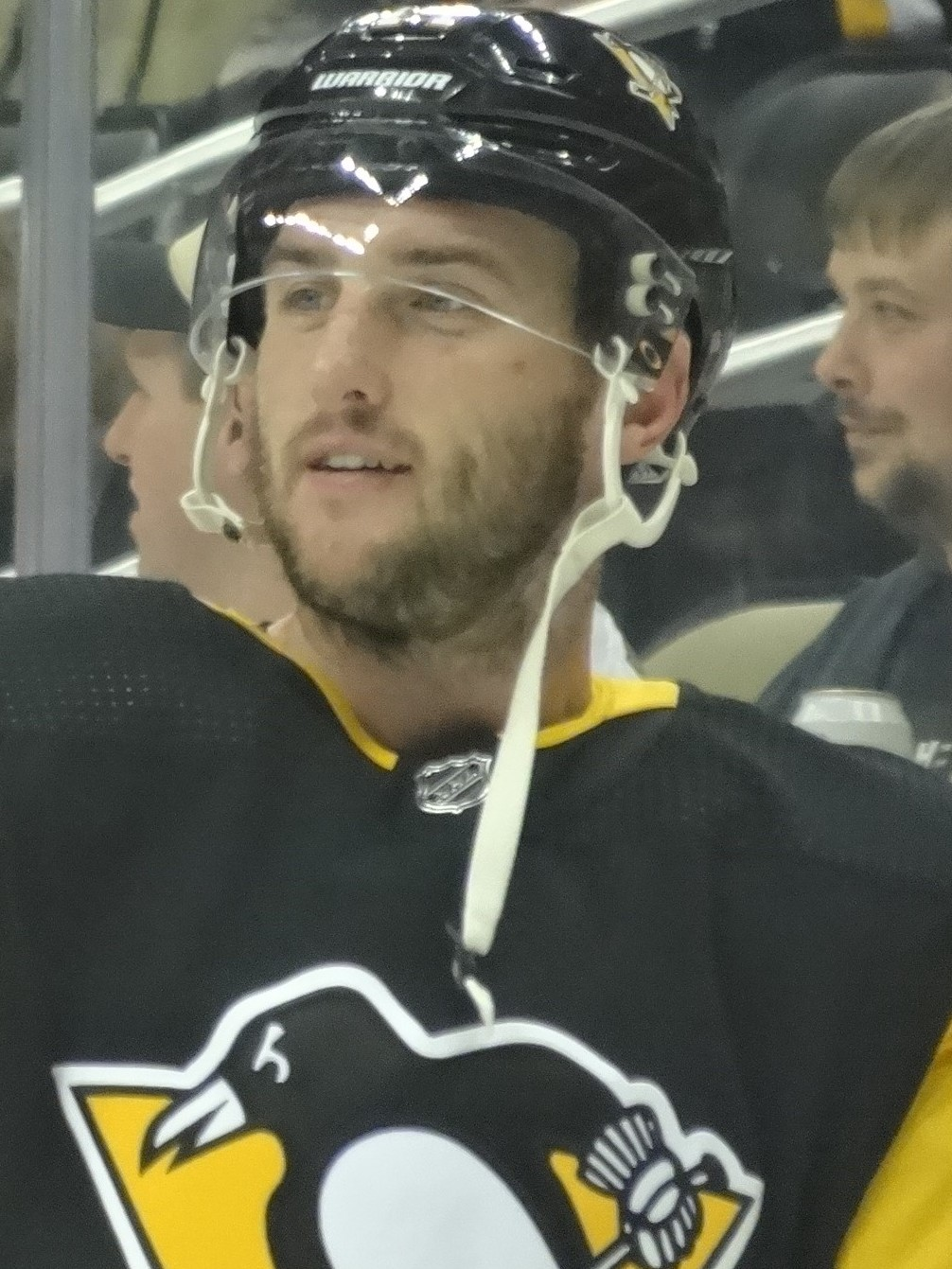
- Noesen with the Pittsburgh Penguins in 2019
- Born: February 12, 1993 (age 33) Plano, Texas, U.S.
- Height: 6 ft 1 in (185 cm)
- Weight: 205 lb (93 kg; 14 st 9 lb)
- Position: Winger
- Shoots: Right
- NHL team (P) Cur. team Former teams: New Jersey Devils; Utica Comets (AHL); Anaheim Ducks; Pittsburgh Penguins; San Jose Sharks; Toronto Maple Leafs; Carolina Hurricanes
- NHL draft: 21st overall, 2011; Ottawa Senators
- Playing career: 2013–present

Stefan Noesen (born February 12, 1993) is an American professional ice hockey player who is a winger for the Utica Comets of the American Hockey League (AHL) while under contract to the New Jersey Devils of the National Hockey League (NHL).

== Playing career ==
Noesen grew up playing ice hockey in the Dallas suburbs; one of his childhood teammates was future Devils teammate Blake Coleman. He eventually moved north at age 14 and ended up playing major junior ice hockey with the Plymouth Whalers of the Ontario Hockey League (OHL). He was selected by the Ottawa Senators with the first-round draft pick, which the team obtained from the Nashville Predators in exchange for Mike Fisher. He signed an entry-level contract with Ottawa on December 29, 2011.

Following the resolution of the 2012–13 NHL lockout, Noesen was invited to the Senators' training camp held in Ottawa. He failed to make the Senators' lineup and on January 16, 2013, was returned to junior to play for the major junior team Plymouth Whalers.

On July 5, 2013, Noesen was traded to the Anaheim Ducks along with Jakob Silfverberg and a 2014 first-round pick in exchange for Bobby Ryan. On December 7, 2016, Noesen scored his first NHL goal.

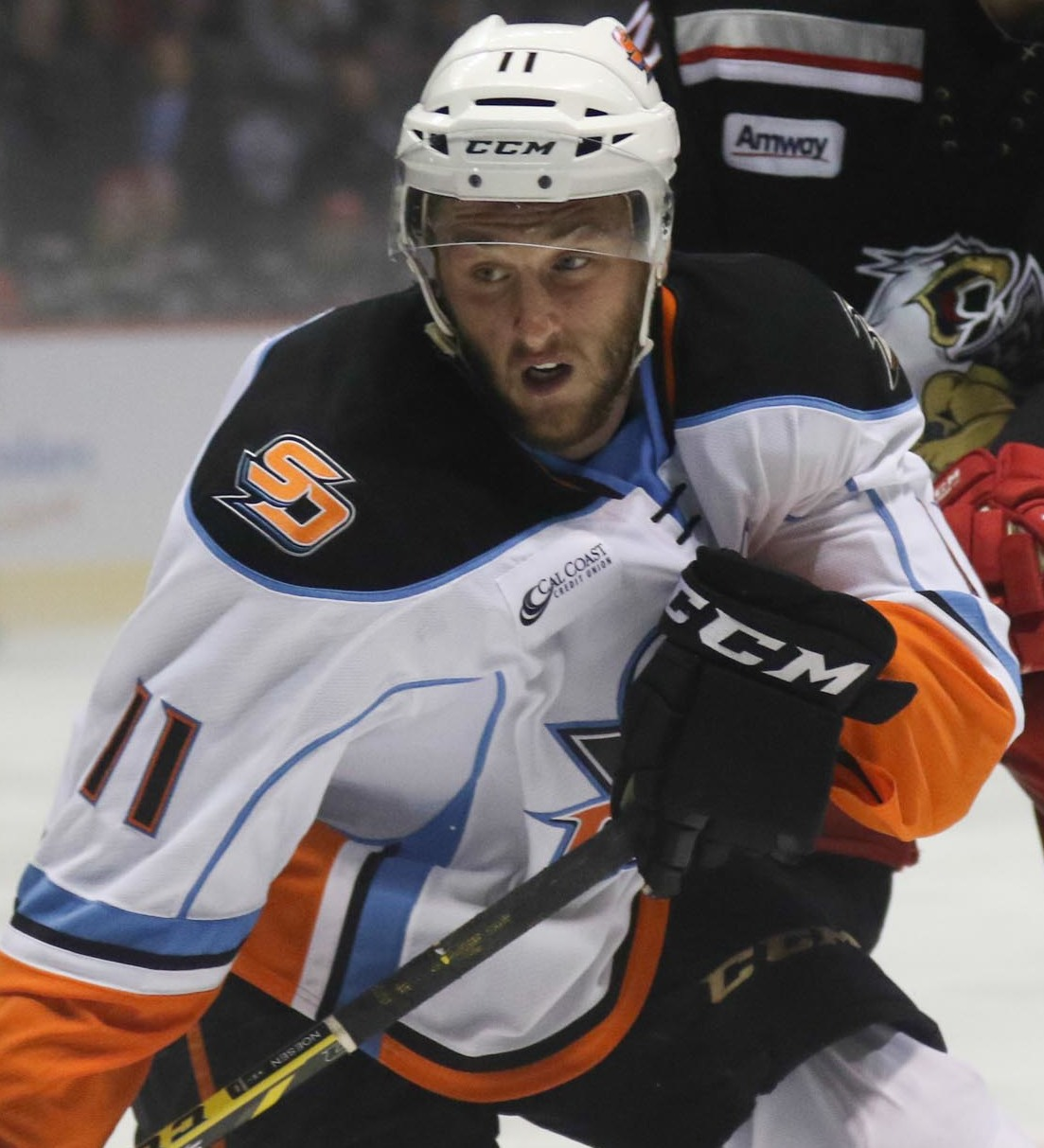
Noesen with the San Diego Gulls in 2015

In the midst of his longest tenure in the NHL during the 2016–17 season, Noesen was placed on waivers by the Ducks after two goals in 12 games. On January 25, 2017, Noesen was claimed off waivers from Anaheim by the New Jersey Devils. On July 26, the Devils re-signed Noesen to a one-year, two-way contract worth $660,000.

Noesen had a career-high in points the following season, scoring a total of 13 goals and 27 points in 72 games; he was one of several improved players on the team who helped the Devils reach the playoffs for the first time since their 2012 Stanley Cup Final appearance, while playing on a line with Travis Zajac and Blake Coleman. His performance improvement earned him another one-year extension with the Devils, which was worth $1.725 million. However, Noesen missed a lot of time during the 2018–19 season after re-injuring his left knee, appearing in only 41 games and registering eight points.

On June 25, 2019, Noesen was not tendered a qualifying offer to remain with the Devils, releasing him as an unrestricted free agent. On September 3, Noesen agreed to attend the Dallas Stars' training camp on a professional tryout (PTO). Noesen remained with the team to play for his home state club through the preseason before he was released by the Stars.

On October 4, 2019, Noesen signed a one-year American Hockey League (AHL) contract with the Wilkes-Barre/Scranton Penguins. After scoring 22 points in as many games with the club, he signed a one-year, two-way contract with the Pittsburgh Penguins on December 2. In his debut on December 4, Noesen scored in a 3–0 win over the St. Louis Blues.

After being waived by the Penguins, he was claimed by the San Jose Sharks on December 19, 2019. He had one goal in nine games with the Penguins. Noesen made his debut two days later against the St. Louis Blues, scoring a goal in a 5–2 loss. He finished the season with six goals and eight points in 31 games with the Sharks. On October 9, 2020, he re-signed with the Sharks on a one-year deal.

During the 2020–21 season, Noesen split time between the Sharks and their AHL affiliate, the San Jose Barracuda. On April 11, 2021, Noesen was traded to the Toronto Maple Leafs along with Nick Foligno in a three-team deal in which the Columbus Blue Jackets received Toronto's 2021 first-round draft pick and 2022 fourth-round draft pick, and the Sharks received Toronto's 2021 fourth-round draft pick.

As a free agent following his brief tenure within the Maple Leafs organization, on July 31, 2021, the Carolina Hurricanes signed Noesen to a one-year, $750,000 contract. Following a successful AHL season and Calder Cup win with the Chicago Wolves, the Hurricanes re-signed him to a two-year deal. In his first full season with Carolina, he played all over the forward group, appearing in 78 games and scoring a career-high 13 goals and 36 points. He scored the game-winning goal in game one of the first round matchup between the Hurricanes and the New York Islanders in the 2023 Stanley Cup playoffs. The Hurricanes eliminated the Islanders in six games. The Hurricanes then defeated the New Jersey Devils in five games, and faced the Florida Panthers in the Eastern Conference finals. Noesen scored in game one, which was the sixth-longest game in NHL history. In game four of the series, Noesen was hurt and left the game with an upper body injury. The Hurricanes were eliminated by the Panthers in four games.

After three successful seasons within the Hurricanes organization, Noesen left Carolina as a free agent and was signed to a three-year, $8.25 million contract to return to former club, the New Jersey Devils, on July 1, 2024.

Noesen appeared in two games with the Devils during the 2026–27 season before he was put on waivers, and was then assigned to New Jersey's AHL affiliate, the Utica Comets, when he cleared waivers on October 9, 2026.

== International play ==
Noesen was named to the United States junior team for the 2013 World Junior Championships but was not allowed to participate in the tournament. At the time, he was serving a 10-game OHL suspension for a charging incident during a game against the Oshawa Generals, and the International Ice Hockey Federation (IIHF) honored the suspension.

== Personal life ==
Noesen married his fiancée Alyson in July 2018.

== Career statistics ==
			Regular season					Playoffs
Season	Team	League	GP	G	A	Pts	PIM	GP	G	A	Pts	PIM
2009–10	Plymouth Whalers	OHL	33	3	5	8	4	—	—	—	—	—
2010–11	Plymouth Whalers	OHL	68	34	43	77	80	11	6	5	11	16
2011–12	Plymouth Whalers	OHL	63	38	44	82	74	7	7	8	15	4
2012–13	Plymouth Whalers	OHL	51	25	28	53	43	15	7	12	19	15
2013–14	Norfolk Admirals	AHL	2	0	0	0	4	4	0	4	4	4
2014–15	Norfolk Admirals	AHL	27	7	9	16	27	—	—	—	—	—
2014–15	Anaheim Ducks	NHL	1	0	0	0	0	—	—	—	—	—
2015–16	San Diego Gulls	AHL	65	10	22	32	56	9	2	5	7	2
2015–16	Anaheim Ducks	NHL	1	0	0	0	0	—	—	—	—	—
2016–17	San Diego Gulls	AHL	22	6	9	15	40	—	—	—	—	—
2016–17	Anaheim Ducks	NHL	12	2	0	2	2	—	—	—	—	—
2016–17	New Jersey Devils	NHL	32	6	2	8	22	—	—	—	—	—
2017–18	New Jersey Devils	NHL	72	13	14	27	36	4	1	0	1	4
2018–19	New Jersey Devils	NHL	41	3	5	8	28	—	—	—	—	—
2019–20	Wilkes-Barre/Scranton Penguins	AHL	22	14	8	22	58	—	—	—	—	—
2019–20	Pittsburgh Penguins	NHL	6	1	0	1	0	—	—	—	—	—
2019–20	San Jose Sharks	NHL	34	6	2	8	32	—	—	—	—	—
2020–21	San Jose Sharks	NHL	5	0	0	0	2	—	—	—	—	—
2020–21	San Jose Barracuda	AHL	12	2	4	6	23	—	—	—	—	—
2020–21	Toronto Maple Leafs	NHL	1	0	0	0	0	—	—	—	—	—
2020–21	Toronto Marlies	AHL	4	1	2	3	9	—	—	—	—	—
2021–22	Chicago Wolves	AHL	70	48	37	85	112	18	9	16	25	18
2021–22	Carolina Hurricanes	NHL	2	0	0	0	0	—	—	—	—	—
2022–23	Carolina Hurricanes	NHL	78	13	23	36	32	15	4	4	8	11
2023–24	Carolina Hurricanes	NHL	81	14	23	37	33	11	4	0	4	21
2024–25	New Jersey Devils	NHL	78	22	19	41	54	5	1	1	2	10
2025–26	New Jersey Devils	NHL	38	3	4	7	33	—	—	—	—	—
NHL totals			482	83	92	175	274	35	10	5	15	46

== Awards and honors ==
Award	Year	Ref
AHL
First All-Star Team	2022	
Calder Cup champion	2022	

Awards and achievements
Preceded by Mika Zibanejad	Ottawa Senators first-round draft pick 2011	Succeeded by Matt Puempel
