= Logan Hensler =

American ice hockey player (born 2006)

- Hensler playing for the University of Wisconsin in January 2026
- Born: October 14, 2006 (age 19) Woodbury, Minnesota, U.S.
- Height: 6 ft 2 in (188 cm)
- Weight: 192 lb (87 kg; 13 st 10 lb)
- Position: Defense
- Shoots: Right
- NCAA team: University of Wisconsin
- NHL draft: 23rd overall, 2025; Ottawa Senators

Logan Hensler (born October 14, 2006) is an American college ice hockey defenseman for the University of Wisconsin of the National Collegiate Athletic Association (NCAA). He was drafted 23rd overall by the Ottawa Senators in the 2025 NHL entry draft.

== Early life and education ==
Hensler was born to Joe and Alicia Hensler, and has two brothers, Dylan and Dain. He attended Saint Ambrose of Woodbury Catholic School in Woodbury, Minnesota, where he played ice hockey for Woodbury Athletic Association (WAA). He was named a finalist for the Wiz Wyatt Award in 2020. He then attended Hill-Murray School in Maplewood, Minnesota. During the 2021–22 season he recorded seven goals and 17 assists in 31 games.

== Playing career ==
Hensler played for the USA Hockey National Team Development Program (NTDP) during the 2022–23 season, where he recorded five goals and 23 assists in 60 games with the under-17 team. He also recorded five goals and 15 assists in 38 games in the United States Hockey League (USHL). During the 2023–24 season, he recorded four goals and 28 assists in 61 games with the under-18 team, and three goals and 13 assists in 27 games for the NTDP in the USHL. During the 2023 Dick's Sporting Goods USHL Fall Classic he recorded two goals and three assists in two games, including the game-winning overtime goal in a game against Dubuque Fighting Saints. He was subsequently named the USHL's defenseman of the week for the week ending September 26, 2023.

On August 15, 2023, Hensler verbally committed to play college ice hockey at the University of Wisconsin. On November 14, he signed his National Letter of Intent (NLI) to play ice hockey during the 2024–25 season. At 17 years old, he is the youngest player on the team.

== International play ==
Medal record

Representing United States

Ice hockey

World Junior Championships
Gold medal – first place	2025 Canada	

World U18 Championships
Silver medal – second place	2024 Finland	

Hensler represented the United States at the 2024 IIHF World U18 Championships where he recorded one goal and five assists in seven games and won a silver medal.

On December 24 2025, Hensler was named to the United States men's national junior ice hockey team to compete at the 2026 World Junior Ice Hockey Championships.

== Career statistics ==
=== Regular season and playoffs ===
			Regular season					Playoffs
Season	Team	League	GP	G	A	Pts	PIM	GP	G	A	Pts	PIM
2022–23	U.S. National Development Team	USHL	38	5	15	20	6	3	0	1	1	0
2023–24	U.S. National Development Team	USHL	27	3	13	16	6	—	—	—	—	—
2024–25	University of Wisconsin	B1G	32	2	10	12	27	—	—	—	—	—
2025–26	University of Wisconsin	B1G	23	4	8	12	20	—	—	—	—	—
NCAA totals			55	6	18	24	47	—	—	—	—	—

=== International ===
Year	Team	Event	Result	GP	G	A	Pts	PIM
2024	United States	U18	2nd place, silver medalist(s)	7	1	5	6	0
2025	United States	WJC	1st place, gold medalist(s)	7	0	1	1	8
2026	United States	WJC	5th	5	0	0	0	4
Junior totals				19	1	6	7	12

== Awards and honours ==
Award	Year	Ref
College
All-Big Ten Freshman Team	2025	

Awards and achievements
Preceded by Carter Yakemchuk	Ottawa Senators first-round draft pick 2025	Succeeded by Jonas Lagerberg Hoen
