= Jaxon Cover =

Caymanian ice hockey player (born 2008)

- Born: February 13, 2008 (age 18) Miami, Florida, U.S.
- Height: 6 ft 2 in (188 cm)
- Weight: 183 lb (83 kg; 13 st 1 lb)
- Position: Left wing
- Shoots: Left
- OHL team: London Knights
- NHL draft: 32nd overall, 2026; Ottawa Senators

Jaxon Cover (born February 13, 2008) is a Caymanian junior ice hockey player who is a left winger for the London Knights of the Ontario Hockey League (OHL). He was drafted 32nd overall by the Ottawa Senators in the 2026 NHL entry draft.

== Playing career ==
Cover was born in Miami, and raised in the Cayman Islands. He began his career playing roller hockey before transitioning to ice hockey at 13 years old. He attended summer hockey camps in Toronto, and moved to Canada to attend St. Andrew's College in Aurora.

In April 2024, Cover was selected in the fourth round, 64th overall, by the London Knights in the OHL Priority Selection. On March 3, 2025, he signed with the Knights. He began his career during the 2024–25 season, and recorded two assists in three games. During the 2025–26 season, he recorded 20 goals and 32 assists in 67 regular season games and two goals and one assist in five games during the playoffs.

On April 10, 2026, he committed to play college ice hockey at Penn State during the 2027–28 season.

On June 26, Cover was drafted in the first round, 32nd overall, by the Ottawa Senators in the 2026 NHL entry draft.

== Personal life ==
Cover's father is Canadian and his mother is Caymanian.

== Career statistics ==
			Regular season					Playoffs
Season	Team	League	GP	G	A	Pts	PIM	GP	G	A	Pts	PIM
2024–25	London Knights	OHL	3	0	2	2	2	—	—	—	—	—
2025–26	London Knights	OHL	67	20	32	52	48	5	2	1	3	6
OHL totals			70	20	34	54	50	5	2	1	3	6

Awards and achievements
Preceded by Jonas Lagerberg Hoen	Ottawa Senators first-round draft pick 2026	Succeeded by Incumbent
