= Jake Sanderson =

Canadian–American ice hockey player (born 2002)

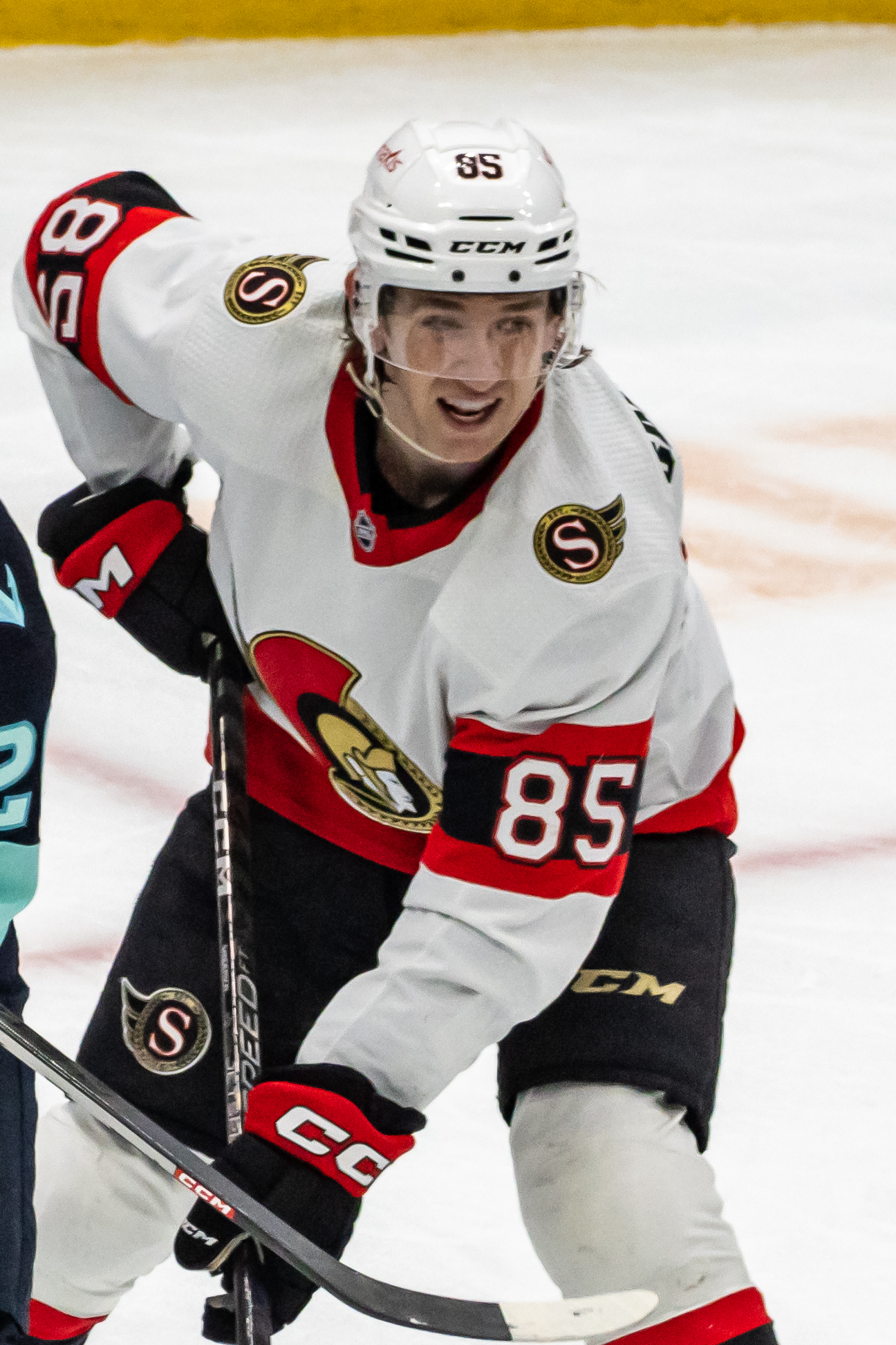
- Sanderson in 2023
- Born: July 8, 2002 (age 24) Whitefish, Montana, U.S.
- Height: 6 ft 2 in (188 cm)
- Weight: 202 lb (92 kg; 14 st 6 lb)
- Position: Defense
- Shoots: Left
- NHL team: Ottawa Senators
- National team: United States
- NHL draft: 5th overall, 2020; Ottawa Senators
- Playing career: 2022–present

Jake Sanderson (born July 8, 2002) is an American and Canadian professional ice hockey player who is a defenseman and alternate captain for the Ottawa Senators of the National Hockey League (NHL). He was selected by the Senators in the first round, fifth overall, of the 2020 NHL entry draft.

== Early life ==
Sanderson was born on July 8, 2002, in Whitefish, Montana, United States, to former National Hockey League (NHL) forward Geoff Sanderson and his wife Ellen. His uncle Guy played for Clarkson University while his father's cousins Wade and Sheldon Brookbank both played in the NHL. Similarly, his brother Ben committed to playing ice hockey at Colorado College and his younger brother Sawyer played AA hockey. While his father played professionally, Sanderson and his brothers moved to Phoenix, Arizona; Buffalo, New York; and Columbus, Ohio.

In Whitefish, Sanderson competed for the Glacier Avalanche of the Glacier Hockey Association alongside his brother Ben from age eight to 11. At the age of 12, the family moved to Calgary, Alberta. Sanderson originally aspired to be a goaltender and even had his own set of equipment at one point, but was eventually deterred by his father and committed to being a skater. He played a mix of forward and defense growing up and eventually became a full-time defenseman at 14 years of age. Sanderson is a dual citizen of Canada and the United States.

== Playing career ==
Upon moving to Calgary, Sanderson played within the Springbank Rockies minor hockey association and earned stints with the Calgary Bantam AAA Flames and the Edge School Mountaineers Elite 15s. He was eventually drafted in the fourth round of the Western Hockey League (WHL) draft by the Kootenay Ice but chose to maintain his National Collegiate Athletic Association (NCAA) eligibility. Sanderson moved to play at the Edge School before joining the U.S. National Development Team (USNTDP).

As a member of the USNTDP, Sanderson was encouraged to graduate early from high school and play college hockey a year early. He was scouted by two schools, the University of North Dakota (UND) and Harvard University, before agreeing to UND. In his final year with the USNTDP, Sanderson recorded 29 points in 47 games. As a result, he ranked fourth amongst North American skaters by the NHL Central Scouting Bureau's final ranking. Before the 2020 NHL entry draft, Sanderson was named the winner of the Dave Tyler Junior Player of the Year Award for most outstanding United States-born player in junior hockey.

=== Collegiate ===
Sanderson joined the North Dakota Fighting Hawks men's ice hockey team for the 2020–21 season, which play in the NCAA's National Collegiate Hockey Conference (NCHC), while majoring in kinesiology. As a freshman, he recorded two goals and 13 assists for 15 points through 22 games. Sanderson recorded his first collegiate goal on December 4, 2020, before missing seven games to compete at the 2021 World Junior Ice Hockey Championships with Team USA. He finished his rookie season with numerous honors including being named to the All-NCHC Rookie Team, NCHC Distinguished Scholar-Athlete, and earning All-NCHC Academic Team honors. During the quarterfinals of the NCAA championship, Sanderson led the team in both shots on goal and blocks while seeing nearly 53 minutes of ice time during a historic five-overtime game.

Sanderson returned to UND for his sophomore season as an assistant captain, where he was named to the 2021 NCHC Preseason All-Conference Team.

=== Professional ===
Sanderson was selected by the Ottawa Senators in the first round, fifth overall, of the 2020 NHL entry draft. Having completed his sophomore college season, Sanderson, while recovering from a hand injury, decided to conclude his collegiate career, signing a three-year, entry-level contract with the Ottawa Senators on March 27, 2022. He made his NHL debut in October against the Buffalo Sabres. Sanderson scored his first NHL goal on November 23, 2022, in a 4–1 loss against the Vegas Golden Knights. Sanderson finished eighth in scoring on the Senators during the 2022–23 season, playing well for the team, recording 32 points in 77 games. At the end of the season, Sanderson was named to the NHL's All-Rookie Team.

On September 6, 2023, the Senators announced that Sanderson had signed an eight-year, $64.4-million contract extension with the team. In the 2023–24 season improved his scoring with 38 points in 79 games, recording three assists in a 5–4 victory over the Montreal Canadiens on April 13, 2024. Analysis after the season concluded indicated that Sanderson had become a key member of the Senators' defense corps. In the following 2024–25 season, Sanderson began the season poorly, struggling through the first three months. However, as the season wore on, Sanderson improved, setting career highs in goals (11), assists (46), and points (57). He set three milestones in the season, making his 200th appearance on January 16, 2025, and recording his 100th NHL assist and 100th NHL point. The Senators qualified for the 2025 Stanley Cup playoffs, marking their return for the first time in eight years. The Senators faced the Toronto Maple Leafs in their first round, best-of-seven series. In Game 4 on April 27, with the Senators facing elimination, Sanderson scored his first NHL playoff goal in overtime, to win the game 4–3 . Ultimately the Maple Leafs eliminated the Senators in six games.

Sanderson appeared in 67 games during the 2025–26 season, recording 14 goals and 40 assists. He was ninth in the league in average ice time, With an average of 24:50 minutes per game. Having accrued only four minor penalties in the process, the Professional Hockey Writers' Association named him a finalist for the Lady Byng Memorial Trophy, awarded for sportsmanlike conduct. The Senators qualified for the 2026 Stanley Cup playoffs, entering a first round series against the Carolina Hurricanes, the top team in the Eastern Conference. Sanderson managed two assists in the first three games, before exiting Game 3 midway through after being concussed by Hurricanes forward Taylor Hall. In his absence, the Senators were eliminated in four games.

After suffering a lower-body injury in the Senators 2026 season opener against the Maple Leafs on October 3, Sanderson missed 8 games before returning in a 5-1 win over the Florida Panthers, in which he tallied 2 assists.

== International play ==
Medal record

Men's ice hockey

Representing the United States

Olympic Games
Gold medal – first place	2026 Milano Cortina	

4 Nations Face-Off
Runner-up	2025 Canada/United States	

World Junior Championships
Gold medal – first place	2021 Canada	

While Sanderson is a dual citizen of the United States and Canada, he has chosen to represent the United States internationally. As a member of Team USA at the 2021 World Junior Ice Hockey Championships, he assisted the game-winning goal in the semifinals against Finland. During the finals, he led all team members in ice time with 21 minutes, 41 seconds as they captured the gold medal against Canada.

In his last year of U20 eligibility, Sanderson returned to represent the United States at the 2022 World Junior Ice Hockey Championships. On December 21, 2021, it was announced he would be the captain of the team. Team USA made it to the quarterfinals of the tournament after winning all four games in their group. They were defeated by Czechia 4–2 in the game.

On January 10, 2022, Sanderson accepted an invitation to play for the United States' hockey team at the 2022 Winter Olympic Games. NHL players were ineligible to compete due to COVID-19 complications. On February 4, Sanderson was put into isolation in California before the Olympic Games due to a positive COVID-19 test. Once again Team USA won all their group games and made it to the quarterfinals. However, they were defeated in the shootout by Slovakia.

In February 2025, after star defenseman Quinn Hughes was too hurt to play for the United States at the inaugural 4 Nations Face-Off tournament, Sanderson was asked to join the team as his replacement. The United States advanced to the final against Canada, in which Sanderson scored his first goal of the tournament. However, Canada won the game in overtime 3–2 and the United States finished second.

On January 2, 2026, he was named to Team USA's roster for the 2026 Winter Olympics. Sanderson finished the games with two assists and a minus-1 overall, with 10 shots total on goal. Both assists had been during the game against Germany. Amid backlash faced by the men's Olympic hockey team regarding the inclusion of FBI director Kash Patel during their gold medal celebrations and members of the team laughing at President Trump's comments of being impeached if he did not invite the women's team to the White House, Sanderson was among the majority who visited with the president and attended the State of the Union. When asked about the team and his personal reaction afterwards, Sanderson stated that laughing at Trump's joke was a mistake and that there was a positive relationship between the men and women's teams.

== Career statistics ==
=== Regular season and playoffs ===
			Regular season					Playoffs
Season	Team	League	GP	G	A	Pts	PIM	GP	G	A	Pts	PIM
2018–19	US NTDP Juniors	USHL	22	2	5	7	0	2	0	1	1	0
2018–19	US NTDP U17	USDP	44	4	20	24	18	—	—	—	—	—
2019–20	US NTDP Juniors	USHL	19	2	12	14	8	—	—	—	—	—
2019–20	US NTDP U18	USDP	47	7	22	29	12	—	—	—	—	—
2020–21	University of North Dakota	NCHC	22	2	13	15	4	—	—	—	—	—
2021–22	University of North Dakota	NCHC	23	8	18	26	6	—	—	—	—	—
2022–23	Ottawa Senators	NHL	77	4	28	32	12	—	—	—	—	—
2023–24	Ottawa Senators	NHL	79	10	28	38	23	—	—	—	—	—
2024–25	Ottawa Senators	NHL	80	11	46	57	12	6	1	2	3	2
2025–26	Ottawa Senators	NHL	67	14	40	54	8	3	0	2	2	2
NHL totals			303	39	142	181	55	9	1	4	5	4

=== International ===
Year	Team	Event	Result	GP	G	A	Pts	PIM
2018	United States	U17	8th	5	0	1	1	0
2021	United States	WJC	1st place, gold medalist(s)	7	0	2	2	0
2022	United States	OG	5th	1	0	1	1	0
2024	United States	WC	5th	8	0	4	4	0
2025	United States	4NF	2nd	2	1	0	1	0
2026	United States	OG	1st place, gold medalist(s)	6	0	2	2	0
Junior totals				12	0	3	3	0
Senior totals				17	1	7	8	0

== Awards and honors ==
Award	Year	Ref
College
All-NCHC Rookie Team	2021	
NCHC All-Tournament Team	2021	
All-NCHC Second Team	2022	
AHCA West First Team All-American	2022	
NHL
NHL All-Rookie Team	2023	

Awards and achievements
Preceded by Tim Stützle	Ottawa Senators first-round draft pick 2020	Succeeded by Ridly Greig
