= Bedsy =

Bedsy is a nickname that may refer to:

- Connor Bedard (born 2005), Canadian ice hockey player
- Danny Buderus (born 1978), Australian rugby league player
