= List of current NHL captains and alternate captains =

Professional ice hockey players who lead their teams in the National Hockey League

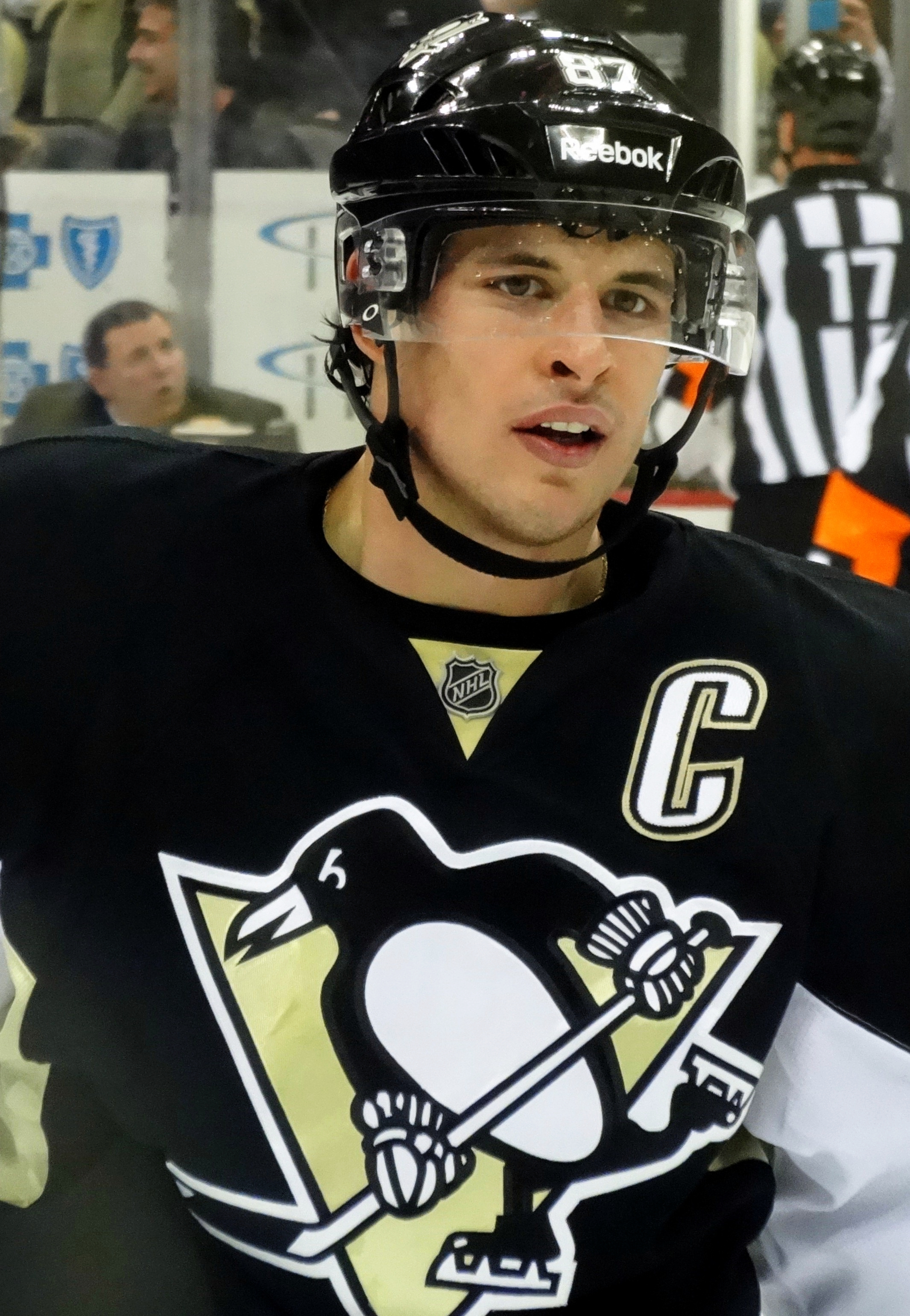
Sidney Crosby, the longest-tenured captain in NHL history, and captain of the Pittsburgh Penguins since 2007. The captain can be identified by the large "C" on his jersey.

The National Hockey League (NHL) is a professional ice hockey league composed of 32 teams, founded in 1917. Each team may select a captain, who has the "privilege of discussing with the referee any questions relating to interpretation of rules which may arise during the progress of a game." Each team is also permitted to select alternate captains, who serve when the captain is not on the ice. Captains are required to wear the letter "C" on their uniform for identification while alternate captains wear the letter "A"; both letters are 3 inches (7.6 cm) in height.

Rule 6.2 of the 2008–09 Official NHL Rulebook indicates that "[only] when the captain is not in uniform, the coach shall have the right to designate three alternate captains. This must be done prior to the start of the game." Many NHL teams with a named captain select more than two alternate captains and rotate the "A"s among these players throughout the season.

Goaltenders are not permitted to serve as captains during games. This rule was instituted in 1948 after teams complained that it took Montreal Canadiens goaltender Bill Durnan too long to skate to talk with the officials and back to his crease. Vancouver Canucks goaltender Roberto Luongo served as captain for two seasons (2008–09 and 2009–10), but because of the League's rule, he was not allowed to serve as captain on-ice or wear the "C" on his jersey, though it was incorporated into the artwork on his mask. As a result, the Canucks were allowed to dress three alternate captains in games, as opposed to the League standard of two. Two (of the three) alternate captains handled on-ice duties in Luongo's place. Other than Durnan and Luongo, five other goaltenders have captained their team: John Ross Roach of the Toronto St. Patricks, George Hainsworth of the Montreal Canadiens, Roy Worters of the New York Americans, Alec Connell of the original Ottawa Senators and Charlie Gardiner of the Chicago Black Hawks.

When Connor McDavid was named captain of the Edmonton Oilers, he became the youngest permanent captain in NHL history. Gabriel Landeskog of the Colorado Avalanche and Sidney Crosby of the Pittsburgh Penguins, are the second- and third-youngest players to be named captain in NHL history, respectively. In 1984, Brian Bellows was named interim captain of the Minnesota North Stars when Craig Hartsburg was injured, and is the youngest player to captain a team in NHL history. However, because Bellows served only on an interim basis, McDavid retains the distinction of being the youngest permanent captain in the League's history. Mark Messier is the only player to captain two separate teams to Stanley Cup championships, those being the 1989–90 Edmonton Oilers and the 1993–94 New York Rangers. Sidney Crosby also became the youngest captain to win the Stanley Cup with the Pittsburgh Penguins in 2009, when Crosby was just 21 years old. The oldest permanent captain in league history was Zdeno Chara of the Boston Bruins, who turned 43 years old during his last NHL season (2019–20) with the Bruins.

== Key ==
† Spent entire NHL career with team

Position abbreviations
Abbreviation	Definition
C	Centre
LW	Left wing
RW	Right wing
D	Defenceman

== Captains ==
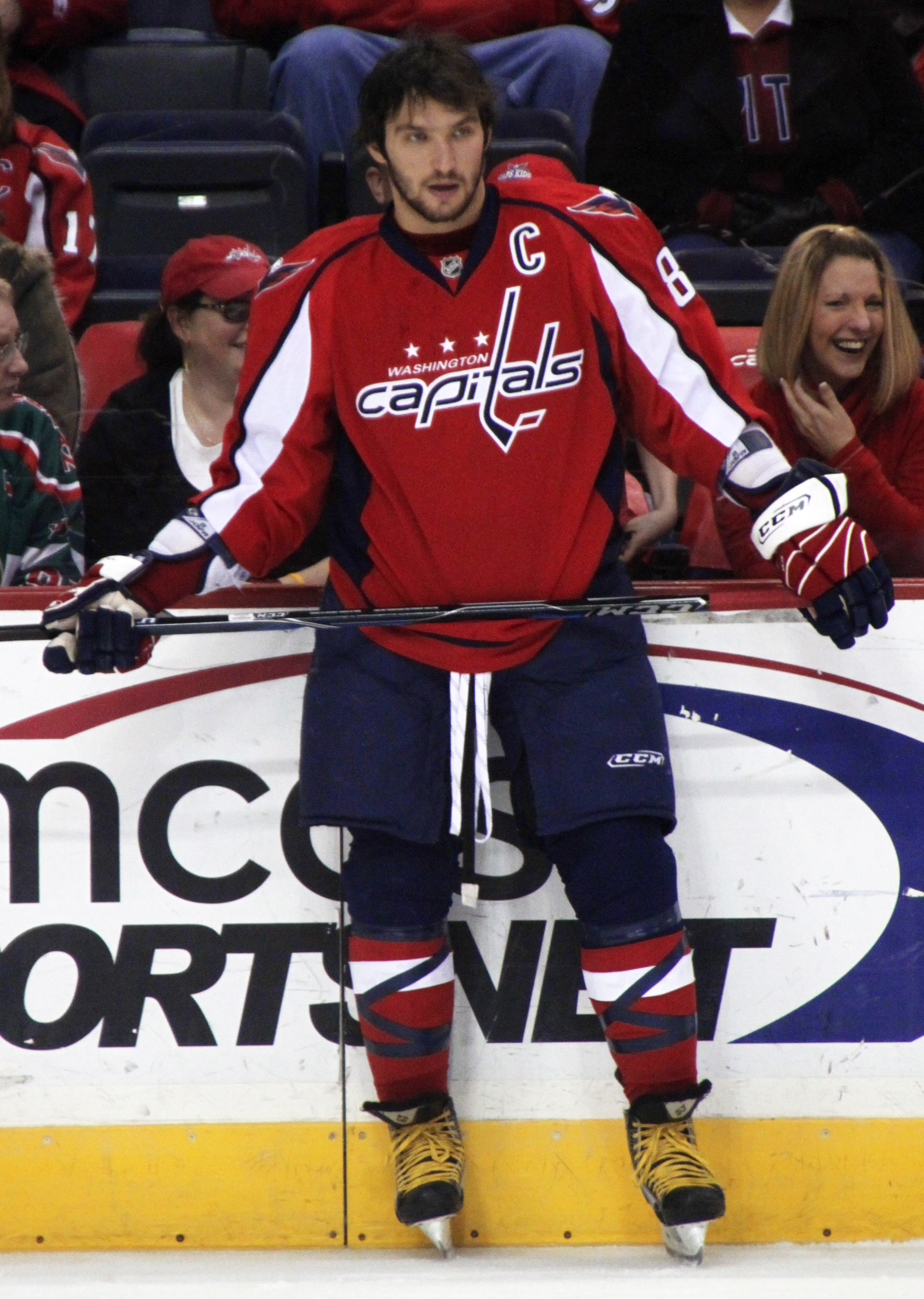
Alexander Ovechkin, captain of the Washington Capitals since 2010

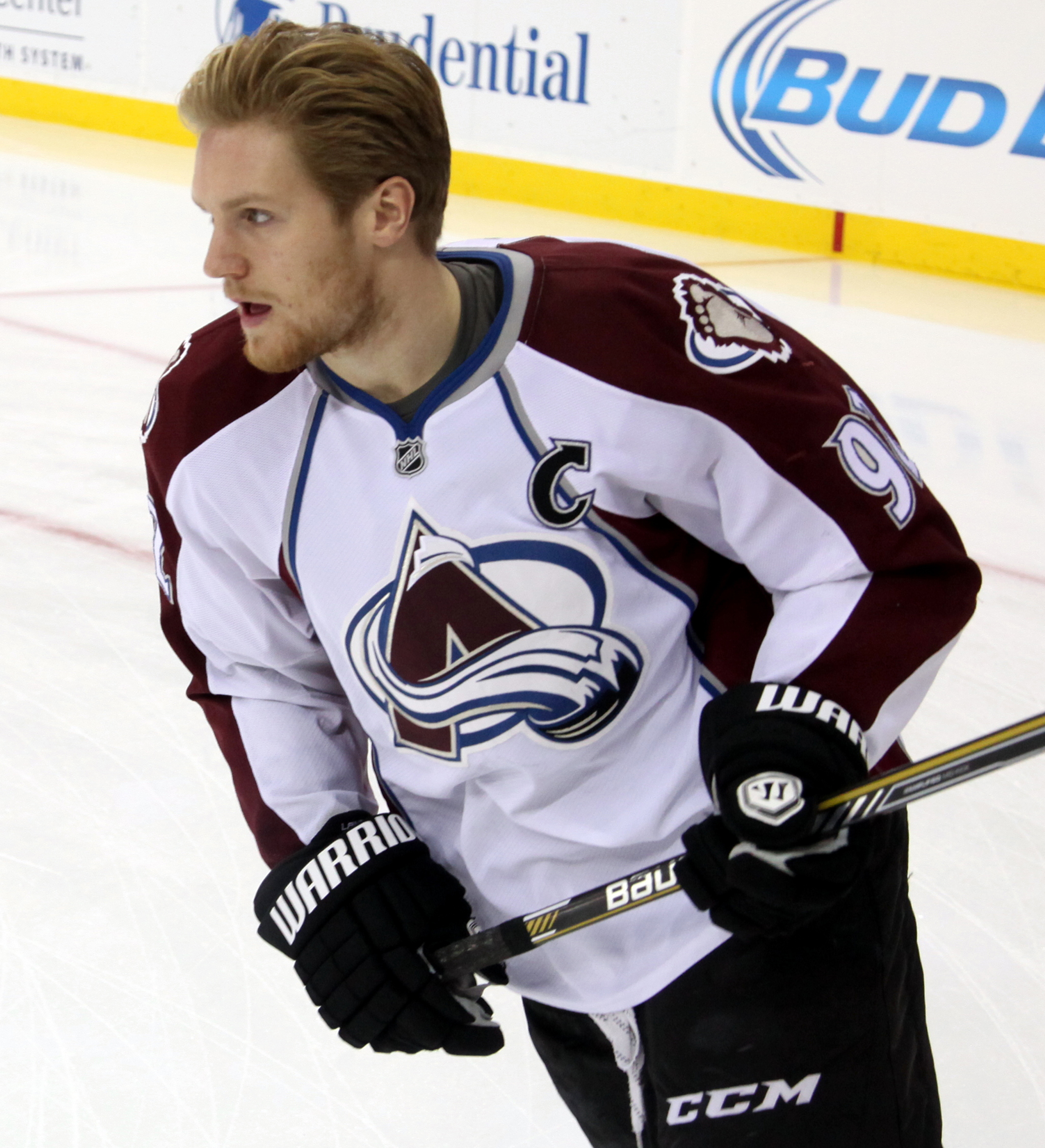
Gabriel Landeskog, captain of the Colorado Avalanche since 2012

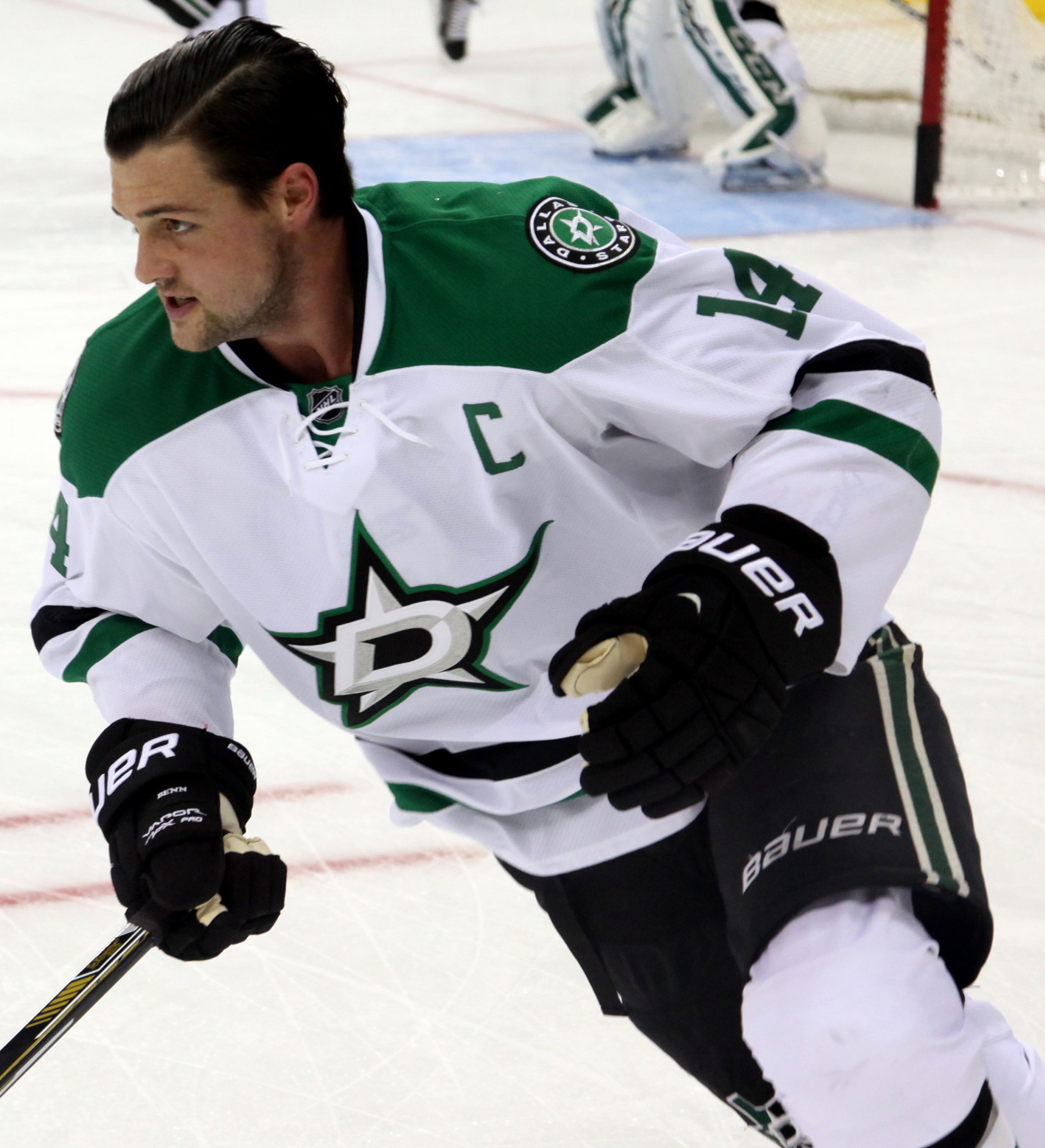
Jamie Benn, captain of the Dallas Stars since 2013

Twenty-nine of the thirty-two NHL teams currently have a captain, with the Columbus Blue Jackets, Detroit Red Wings, and Vancouver Canucks being the three exceptions. Of the twenty-nine captains, twenty-two of them have been with their team for their entire NHL career. The current longest-tenured captain in the league is Sidney Crosby of the Pittsburgh Penguins, who has served in that role since May 31, 2007.

List of current NHL Captains
Team	Captain	Since	Pos
Anaheim Ducks	Mikael Granlund	2026–27	C
Boston Bruins	David Pastrňák†	2026–27	RW
Buffalo Sabres	Rasmus Dahlin†	2024–25	D
Calgary Flames	Mikael Backlund†	2023–24	C
Carolina Hurricanes	Jordan Staal	2019–20	C
Chicago Blackhawks	Connor Bedard†	2026–27	C
Colorado Avalanche	Gabriel Landeskog†	2012–13	LW
Columbus Blue Jackets	Vacant	2026–27 (Note: Most recent captain, Boone Jenner, left as a free agent following the 2025–26 season and signed with the Washington Capitals.)	—N/a
Dallas Stars	Jamie Benn†	2013–14	LW
Detroit Red Wings	Vacant	2026–27 (Note: Most recent captain, Dylan Larkin, was stripped of his captaincy in September 2026.)	—N/a
Edmonton Oilers	Connor McDavid†	2016–17	C
Florida Panthers	Aleksander Barkov†	2018–19	C
Los Angeles Kings	Drew Doughty†	2026–27	D
Minnesota Wild	Jared Spurgeon†	2020–21	D
Montreal Canadiens	Nick Suzuki†	2022–23	C
Nashville Predators	Roman Josi†	2017–18	D
New Jersey Devils	Nico Hischier†	2020–21	C
New York Islanders	Bo Horvat	2026–27	C
New York Rangers	J. T. Miller	2025–26	C
Ottawa Senators	Thomas Chabot†	2026–27	D
Philadelphia Flyers	Sean Couturier†	2023–24	C
Pittsburgh Penguins	Sidney Crosby†	2007–08	C
San Jose Sharks	Macklin Celebrini†	2026–27	C
Seattle Kraken	Jordan Eberle	2024–25	RW
St. Louis Blues	Robert Thomas†	2026–27	C
Tampa Bay Lightning	Victor Hedman†	2024–25	D
Toronto Maple Leafs	Auston Matthews†	2024–25	C
Utah Mammoth	Clayton Keller	2024–25	LW
Vancouver Canucks	Vacant	2025–26 (Note: Most recent captain, Quinn Hughes, was traded to the Minnesota Wild in December 2025.)	—N/a
Vegas Golden Knights	Mark Stone	2020–21	RW
Washington Capitals	Alexander Ovechkin†	2009–10	LW
Winnipeg Jets	Adam Lowry†	2023–24	C

== Alternate captains ==
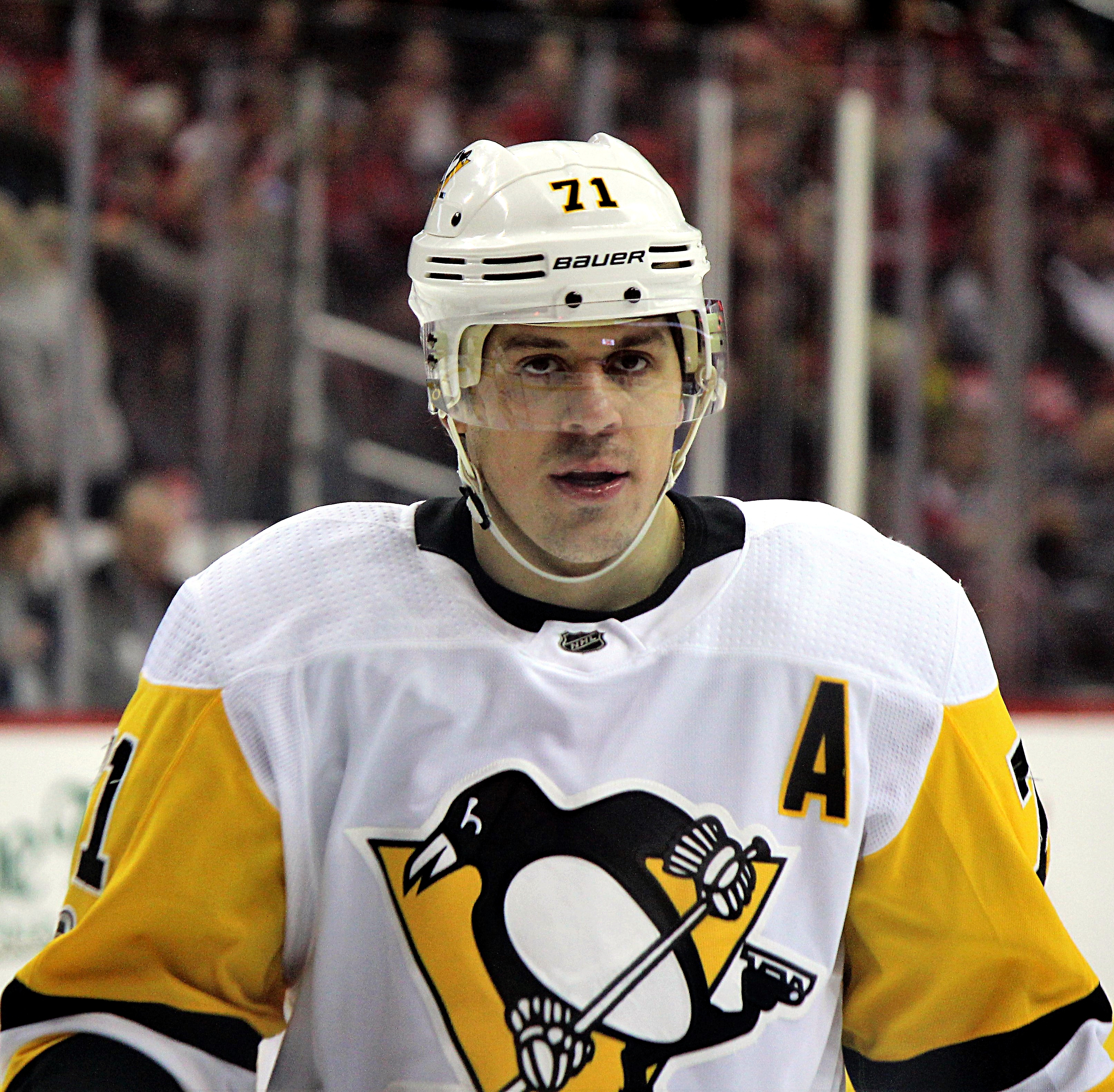
Evgeni Malkin, the longest-tenured alternate captain in the NHL, and alternate captain of the Pittsburgh Penguins since 2008

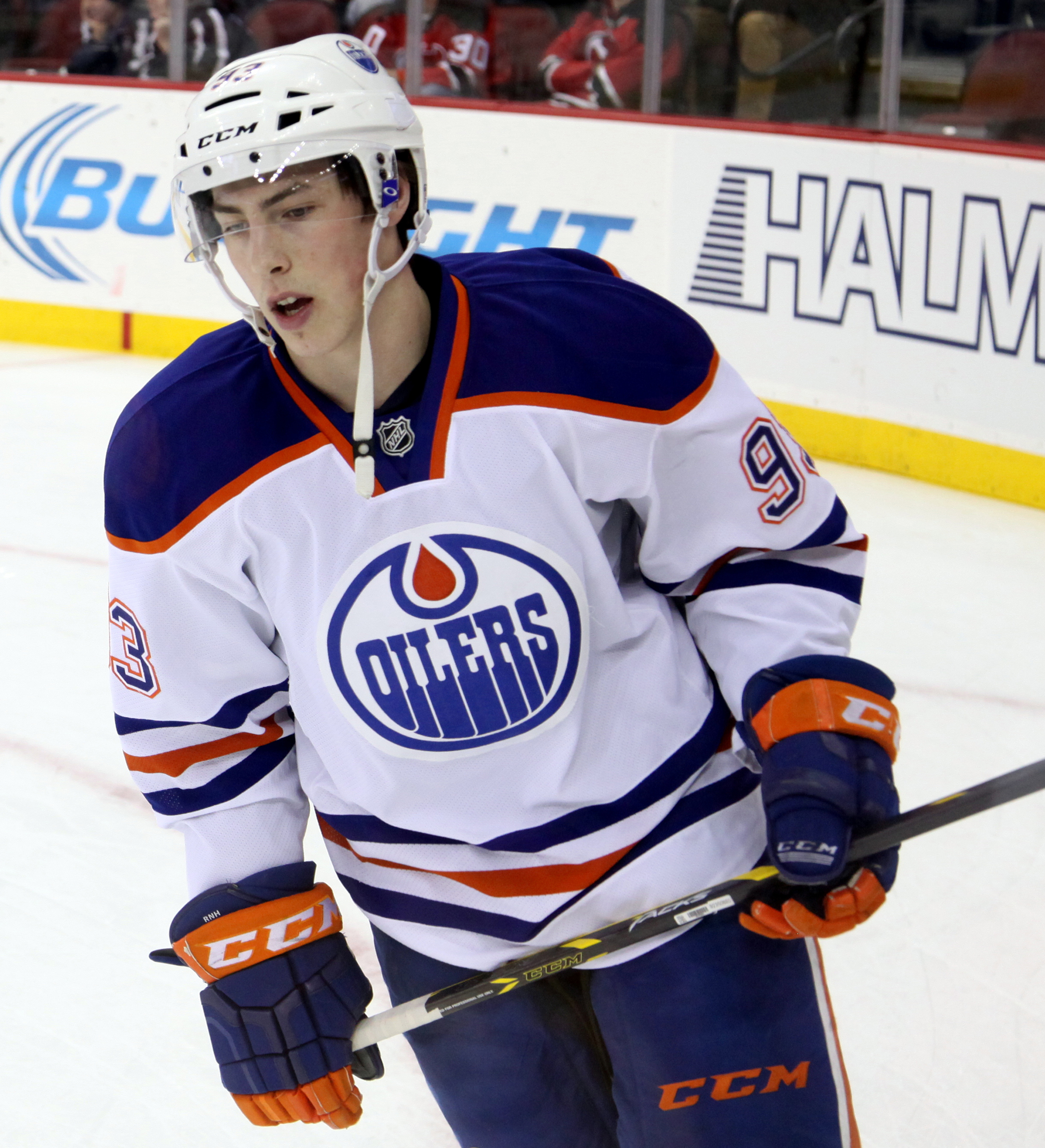
Ryan Nugent-Hopkins, alternate captain of the Edmonton Oilers since 2015

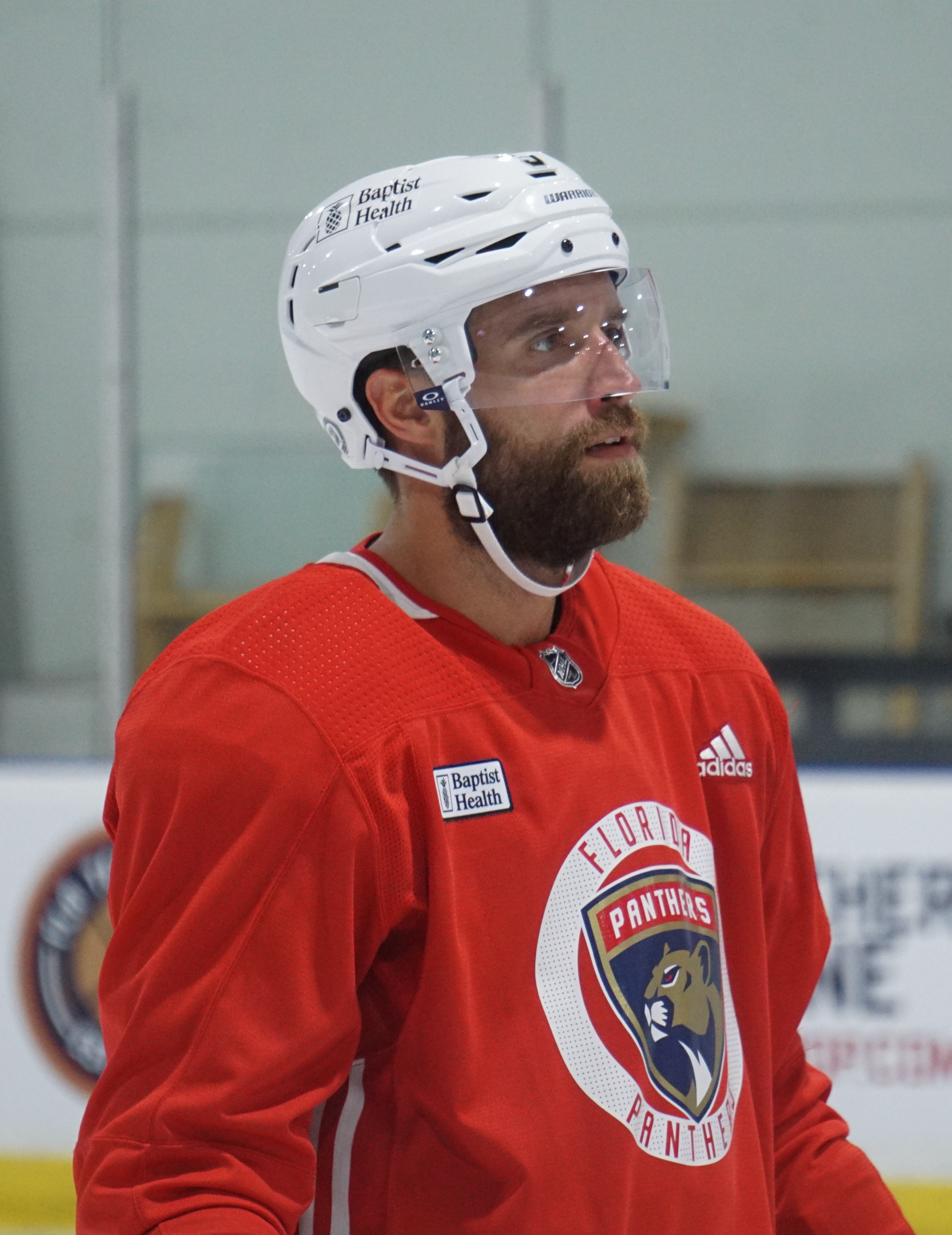
Aaron Ekblad, alternate captain of the Florida Panthers since 2016

Thirty-one of the thirty-two NHL teams have named at least the regulation two alternate captains with the exception of the Columbus Blue Jackets. Of the ninety alternate captains, forty-five of them have been with their team for their entire NHL career. Teams that have named more than the regulation two alternate captains (or three in the case of teams without a captain) are required to rotate the two (or three) "A"s between those players by methods of their choosing. The current longest-tenured alternate captain in the league is Evgeni Malkin of the Pittsburgh Penguins, who has served in that role since 2008.

List of current NHL alternate captains
Team	Alternate captain(s)	Since	Pos
Anaheim Ducks	Leo Carlsson†	2025–26	C
Anaheim Ducks	Jackson LaCombe†	2025–26	D
Anaheim Ducks	Alex Killorn	2023–24	LW
Anaheim Ducks	Troy Terry†	2026–27	RW
Boston Bruins
Boston Bruins	Tanner Jeannot	2026–27	LW
Boston Bruins	Hampus Lindholm	2025–26	D
Boston Bruins	Charlie McAvoy†	2023–24	D
Buffalo Sabres
Buffalo Sabres	Mattias Samuelsson†	2024–25	D
Buffalo Sabres	Tage Thompson	2024–25	C
Calgary Flames
Calgary Flames	Jonathan Huberdeau	2022–23	LW
Calgary Flames	Zach Whitecloud	2026–27	D
Carolina Hurricanes
Carolina Hurricanes	Sebastian Aho†	2021–22	C
Carolina Hurricanes	Jordan Martinook	2019–20	LW
Carolina Hurricanes	Jaccob Slavin†	2019–20	D
Chicago Blackhawks
Chicago Blackhawks	Tyler Bertuzzi	2025–26	LW
Chicago Blackhawks	Patrick Kane	2026–27	RW
Colorado Avalanche
Colorado Avalanche	Nathan MacKinnon†	2016–17	C
Colorado Avalanche	Cale Makar†	2023–24	D
Columbus Blue Jackets
Columbus Blue Jackets	Zach Werenski†	2021–22	D
Columbus Blue Jackets	Rotating	2026–27	--
Dallas Stars
Dallas Stars	Miro Heiskanen†	2022–23	D
Dallas Stars	Roope Hintz†	2024–25	C
Dallas Stars	Esa Lindell†	2019–20	D
Dallas Stars	Tyler Seguin	2017–18	C
Detroit Red Wings
Detroit Red Wings	Alex DeBrincat	2026–27	LW
Detroit Red Wings	Lucas Raymond†	2025–26	RW
Detroit Red Wings	Moritz Seider†	2025–26	D
Edmonton Oilers
Edmonton Oilers	Evan Bouchard†	2026–27	D
Edmonton Oilers	Leon Draisaitl†	2019–20	C
Edmonton Oilers	Zach Hyman	2026–27	LW
Edmonton Oilers	Ryan Nugent-Hopkins†	2015–16	C
Florida Panthers
Florida Panthers	Aaron Ekblad†	2016–17	D
Florida Panthers	Matthew Tkachuk	2022–23	RW
Los Angeles Kings	Mikey Anderson†	2025–26	D
Los Angeles Kings	Adrian Kempe†	2025–26	RW
Los Angeles Kings	Artemi Panarin	2026–27	LW
Minnesota Wild	Marcus Foligno	2021–22	LW
Minnesota Wild	Kirill Kaprizov†	2023–24	LW
Montreal Canadiens	Josh Anderson	2026–27	RW
Montreal Canadiens	Mike Matheson	2023–24	D
Nashville Predators
Nashville Predators	Jack Drury	2026–27	C
Nashville Predators	Filip Forsberg†	2024–25	LW
Nashville Predators	Ryan O'Reilly	2023–24	C
Nashville Predators	Steven Stamkos	2025–26	C
New Jersey Devils
New Jersey Devils	Jesper Bratt†	2025–26	LW
New Jersey Devils	Jack Hughes†	2022–23	C
New York Islanders
New York Islanders	Kyle Palmieri	2024–25	RW
New York Islanders	Ryan Pulock†	2024–25	D
New York Islanders	Matthew Schaefer†	2026–27	D
New York Islanders	Brayden Schenn	2026–27	C
New York Rangers
New York Rangers	Adam Fox†	2023–24	D
New York Rangers	Mika Zibanejad	2018-19	C
Ottawa Senators
Ottawa Senators	Claude Giroux	2022–23	RW
Ottawa Senators	Jake Sanderson†	2026–27	D
Ottawa Senators	Tim Stützle†	2026–27	C
Philadelphia Flyers
Philadelphia Flyers	Travis Konecny†	2023–24	RW
Philadelphia Flyers	Travis Sanheim†	2025–26	D
Pittsburgh Penguins	Kris Letang†	2017–18	D
Pittsburgh Penguins	Evgeni Malkin†	2008–09	C
San Jose Sharks
San Jose Sharks	Barclay Goodrow	2024–25	C
San Jose Sharks	Darnell Nurse	2026–27	D
San Jose Sharks	Tyler Toffoli	2024–25	RW
San Jose Sharks	Alexander Wennberg	2025–26	C
Seattle Kraken	Matty Beniers†	2024–25	C
Seattle Kraken	Vince Dunn	2026–27	D
Seattle Kraken	Adam Larsson	2021–22	D
Seattle Kraken	Brandon Montour	2026–27	D
St. Louis Blues
St. Louis Blues	Philip Broberg	2026–27	D
St. Louis Blues	Dylan Holloway	2026–27	C
St. Louis Blues	Jake Neighbours†	2025–26	LW
St. Louis Blues	Colton Parayko†	2020–21	D
Tampa Bay Lightning
Tampa Bay Lightning	Nikita Kucherov†	2022–23	RW
Tampa Bay Lightning	Ryan McDonagh	2024–25	D
Toronto Maple Leafs	Morgan Rielly†	2016–17	D
Toronto Maple Leafs	John Tavares	2024–25	C
Utah Mammoth	Lawson Crouse	2024–25	LW
Utah Mammoth	Mikhail Sergachev	2024–25	D
Vancouver Canucks	Brock Boeser†	2025–26	RW
Vancouver Canucks	Zeev Buium	2026–27	D
Vancouver Canucks	Filip Hronek	2025–26	D
Vancouver Canucks	Linus Karlsson†	2026–27	RW
Vancouver Canucks	Drew O'Connor	2026–27	LW
Vancouver Canucks	Elias Pettersson†	2022–23	C
Vegas Golden Knights
Vegas Golden Knights	Jack Eichel	2023–24	C
Vegas Golden Knights	William Karlsson	2023–24	C
Vegas Golden Knights	Alex Pietrangelo	2020–21	D
Washington Capitals	Matt Roy	2026–27	D
Washington Capitals	Dylan Strome	2025–26	C
Washington Capitals	Tom Wilson†	2023–24	RW
Winnipeg Jets
Winnipeg Jets	Josh Morrissey†	2019–20	D
Winnipeg Jets	Mark Scheifele†	2016–17	C

== See also ==
- List of current AHL captains and alternate captains
