= Adam Lowry =

Canadian ice hockey player (born 1993)

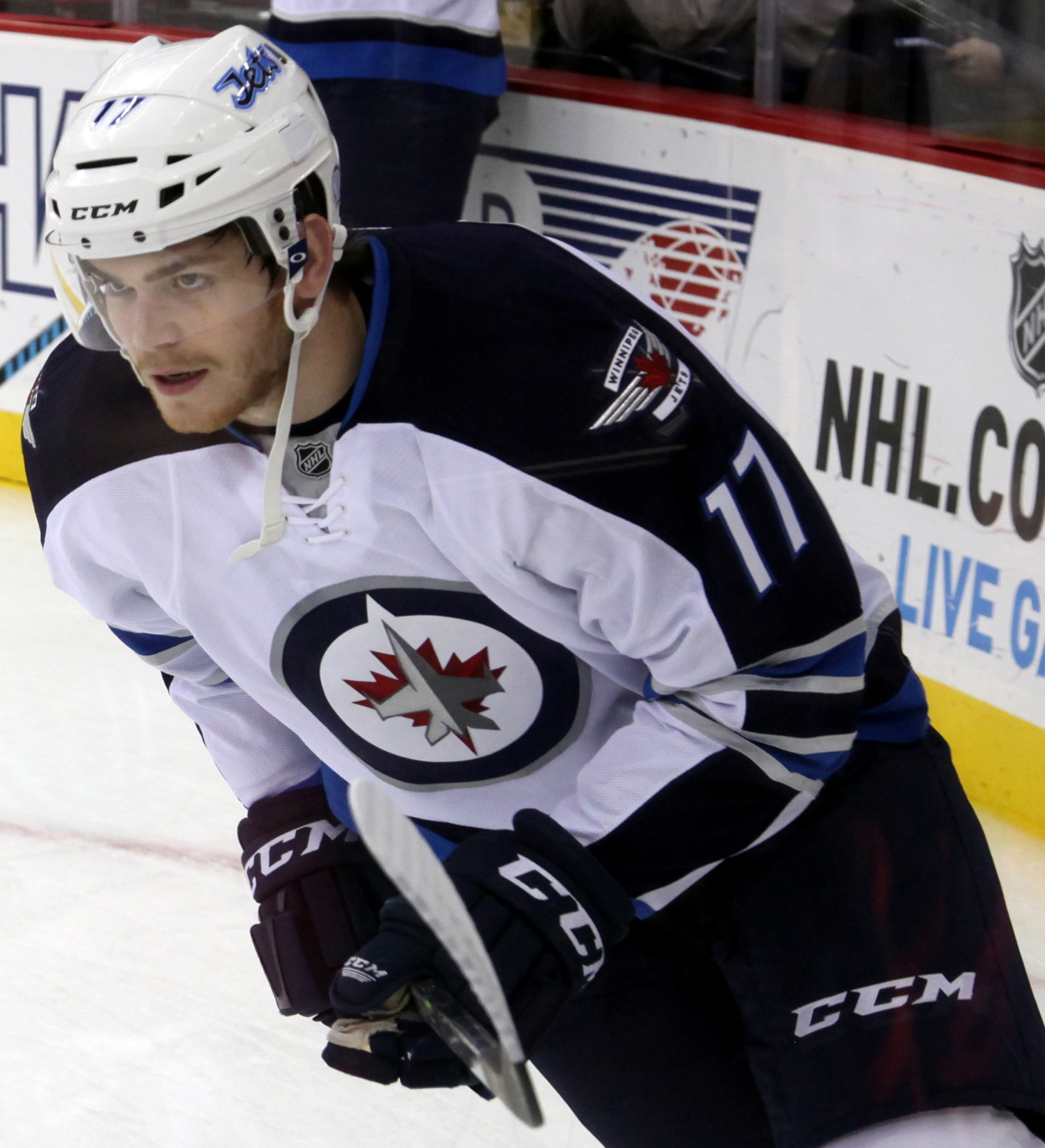
- Lowry with the Winnipeg Jets in 2014
- Born: March 29, 1993 (age 33) St. Louis, Missouri, U.S.
- Height: 6 ft 5 in (196 cm)
- Weight: 205 lb (93 kg; 14 st 9 lb)
- Position: Centre
- Shoots: Left
- NHL team: Winnipeg Jets
- National team: Canada
- NHL draft: 67th overall, 2011; Winnipeg Jets
- Playing career: 2013–present

Adam Lowry (born March 29, 1993) is a Canadian professional ice hockey player who is a centre and captain for the Winnipeg Jets of the National Hockey League (NHL).

== Early life ==
Adam Lowry was born on March 29, 1993, in St. Louis, Missouri, where his father, Dave, was a member of the St. Louis Blues. In 2008, Lowry was drafted in the fourth round, 78th overall by the Swift Current Broncos at the 2008 WHL Bantam Draft. Despite being drafted, Lowry played one more season of minor hockey with the Calgary Rangers of the Alberta Midget Hockey League.

== Playing career ==
=== Amateur ===
On August 27, 2009, Lowry signed a WHL contract with the Swift Current Broncos. In his rookie season with the Broncos, Lowry scored 15 goals and 34 points in 61 games played as a 16-year-old. Lowry won the Daryl K. (Doc) Seaman Trophy as scholastic player of the year.

Entering his second season with the Broncos, Lowry became ill with mononucleosis before training camp. As a result, Lowry was unable to play in August and September 2010. Despite his early-season illness, Lowry finished the season with 18 goals and 45 points in 66 games played as the Broncos failed to advance to the WHL playoffs. For the second consecutive season, Lowry was the Eastern Conference nominee for the Daryl K. (Doc) Seaman Trophy; however, he was unable to defend his title from the previous season, losing the award to Colin Smith of the Kamloops Blazers.

Following his season with the Broncos, Lowry was ranked 58th among North American skaters by the NHL Central Scouting Bureau heading into the 2011 NHL entry draft, and improved over his ranking of 62nd at the midway point of the season. On June 25, 2011, Lowry was drafted in the third round, 67th overall by the Winnipeg Jets.

=== Professional ===
On April 4, 2013, Lowry concluded his major junior career by signing an amateur tryout contract with the St. John's IceCaps of the American Hockey League (AHL). He played six games in the AHL and tallied one assist before signing an entry-level contract with the Jets. Despite finishing early, Lowry was named the recipient of the Four Broncos Memorial Trophy as the 2012–13 WHL Player of the Year. Following the conclusion of the 2012–13 season, Lowry was one of the several prospects invited to participate in the Jets' 2013 Development Camp. In September 2013, after participating in training camp, Lowry was reassigned to the St. John's IceCaps for his first full professional season. While with the IceCaps, Lowry was shifted to center, where he tallied 17 goals and 16 assists for 33 points through 64 games. He also helped the IceCaps reach the 2014 Calder Cup Finals against the Texas Stars, who swept them in five games.

Lowry was promoted to the Winnipeg Jets for the 2014–15 season where he played on their third line alongside Mathieu Perreault and Dustin Byfuglien. Upon joining the team, Lowry scored his first career NHL goal on October 21 to help the Jets beat the Carolina Hurricanes 3–1. His linemates changed throughout the season and by January 2015, he was playing alongside Evander Kane and Chris Thorburn who helped him register six goals and 15 points through 48 games. On April 11, 2015, Lowry was one of five Jets players to score in a win over the Calgary Flames to tie a franchise high of games won and set a new franchise best for points in a season with 99. He subsequently made his post-season debut on April 16 in Game 1 against the Anaheim Ducks. During the game, he became the fastest rookie to score in his NHL playoff debut in eight years. Lowry concluded his rookie season with 12 goals and 26 points through 84 regular–season and playoff games combined. Beyond point production, Lowry also recorded seven hits in six different games during the season to lead all Jets in hits with 256.

Upon re-joining the Jets for his second season, head coach Paul Maurice experimented with Lowry on the first line alongside Andrew Ladd and Bryan Little in an attempt to spread out the offense. By December, he had recorded eight points and 22 penalty minutes through 31 games and was reassigned to the Jets' new AHL affiliate, the Manitoba Moose. After tallying four points in four games with the Moose, Lowry was recalled to the NHL level following the placement of Mark Scheifele on injured reserve. He rejoined the Jets' lineup for their game against the Pittsburgh Penguins and played 16 minutes and 52 seconds of ice time alongside Ladd and Alexander Burmistrov. However, his time in the lineup was cut short after he suffered an upper-body injury on January 14 and was placed on injured reserve. Following a six-day break for the NHL All-Star Game, Lowry returned to practice with the Jets on February 1, 2016. The following day, he rejoined their lineup and scored a goal in a 5–3 loss to the Dallas Stars. His fifth goal of the season came on March 12, to help the Jets win for the first time that season when trailing after two periods. At the conclusion of the season, Lowry was offered a qualifying offer by the Jets to retain his negotiation rights and later signed him to a two-year, one-way contract with an average annual value of $1.125 million.

In the first year of his new contract, Lowry set new career-highs with 15 goals and 14 assists for 29 points while playing a mostly defensive role. He finished the season averaging over two-and-a-half minutes of shorthanded ice time per game to lead all forwards in that category. Lowry also ranked first in defensive zone face-offs with 159, which accounted for 61 per cent of Lowry's zone starts.

The following season, Lowry was limited to only 45 games due to numerous injuries. As the 2017–18 season approached, he suffered a lower-body injury during a pre-season game against the Calgary Flames. He re-joined the team prior to their opening night game and participated in line rushes between Joel Armia and Brandon Tanev. Lowry played in four games to start the season before being injured again and placed on injured reserve on October 17. He was activated off injured reserve on November 6 for a game against the Dallas Stars. Lowry remained healthy for the next two months before suffering another injury in January which forced him to miss eight games. However, after playing in one game he was returned to injured reserve and the Jets called up Brendan Lemieux and Nic Petan. He missed 19 more games as a result of this injury. Despite being limited to 45 regular-season games for the Jets, he recorded 21 points and eight penalty minutes. He also led Winnipeg forwards in shorthanded time-on-ice in the regular season. Lowry later credited the access to video as being the main reason why his play had improved since his rookie season.

As the Jets qualified for the 2018 Stanley Cup playoffs, they met with the Minnesota Wild in Round One. Lowry continued his face-off streak in Game 1 and won three straight draws to help the Jets protect their one-goal lead. The Jets eventually beat the Wild in five games and they met the Nashville Predators in the Second Round. During their series against the Predators, Lowry tied for second on the Jets with four drawn penalties and ranked fourth in hits with 23. With his assistance, the Jets beat the Predators to qualify for their first Western Conference Final in Jets history. Throughout their post-season run, Lowry remained alongside Andrew Copp but switched between Brandon Tanev and Joel Armia. As a result of his on-ice play, Lowry signed a three-year, $8.75 million contract with an average annual value of $2.916 million to remain with the Jets on July 12, 2018.

Following an injury-riddled season, Lowry returned to the Jets for a completely healthy 2018–19 season. Once again, his linemates changed throughout the season, and his wing was joined by Mathieu Perreault and Brandon Tanev. When speaking about his line, Lowry praised them for being "really tenacious on the puck" and for creating a lot of second chances. In February, Lowry was re-joined with Bryan Little as his winger in a similar position he played during the 2018 playoffs. On March 2, 2019, Lowry was suspended for two games after high-sticking Nashville Predators player Filip Forsberg. Lowry also forfeited $31,362.00 of his salary to the Players' Emergency Assistance Fund. Upon returning from his suspension, Lowry helped lead the Jets to an 8–1 win over the Hurricanes and clinch first place in the Central Division. Lowry's nine goals by March 24, helped the Jets qualify for their second-consecutive Stanley Cup playoffs for the first time in franchise history. When the Jets met with the St. Louis Blues in the first round, Lowry was placed on the fourth line with Pär Lindholm and Jack Roslovic as his wingers. He played two games with this line before being reunited with Tanev and Copp for Game 3 where he remained until they were eliminated in Game 6.

Once the 2019–20 season arrived, Lowry was placed on a new line alongside Gabriel Bourque and Mark Letestu, which was more defensively minded. He was soon reunited with Copp and Roslovic after 11 games. On October 28, 2019, Lowry was suspended for the second time in his career after boarding Flames defenseman Oliver Kylington. Lowry also forfeited $71,138.22 of his salary to the Players' Emergency Assistance Fund. Upon returning from his suspension, Lowry played 11:50 minutes of ice time and recorded three shots on goal in an eventual 4–3 overtime win over the Vegas Golden Knights. As a result of injuries to the Jets' lineup in late December, Lowry's line changed again and he played alongside Bourque and Mason Appleton. Following an open-ice hit on Lowry by Chicago Blackhawks forward Drake Caggiula on January 19, 2020, Lowry was expected to miss at least one month to recover from the upper-body injury. At the time of the injury, he had accumulated four goals and six assists through 47 games. He returned to the Jets' lineup on March 9, for a game against the Arizona Coyotes, after missing 20 straight games.

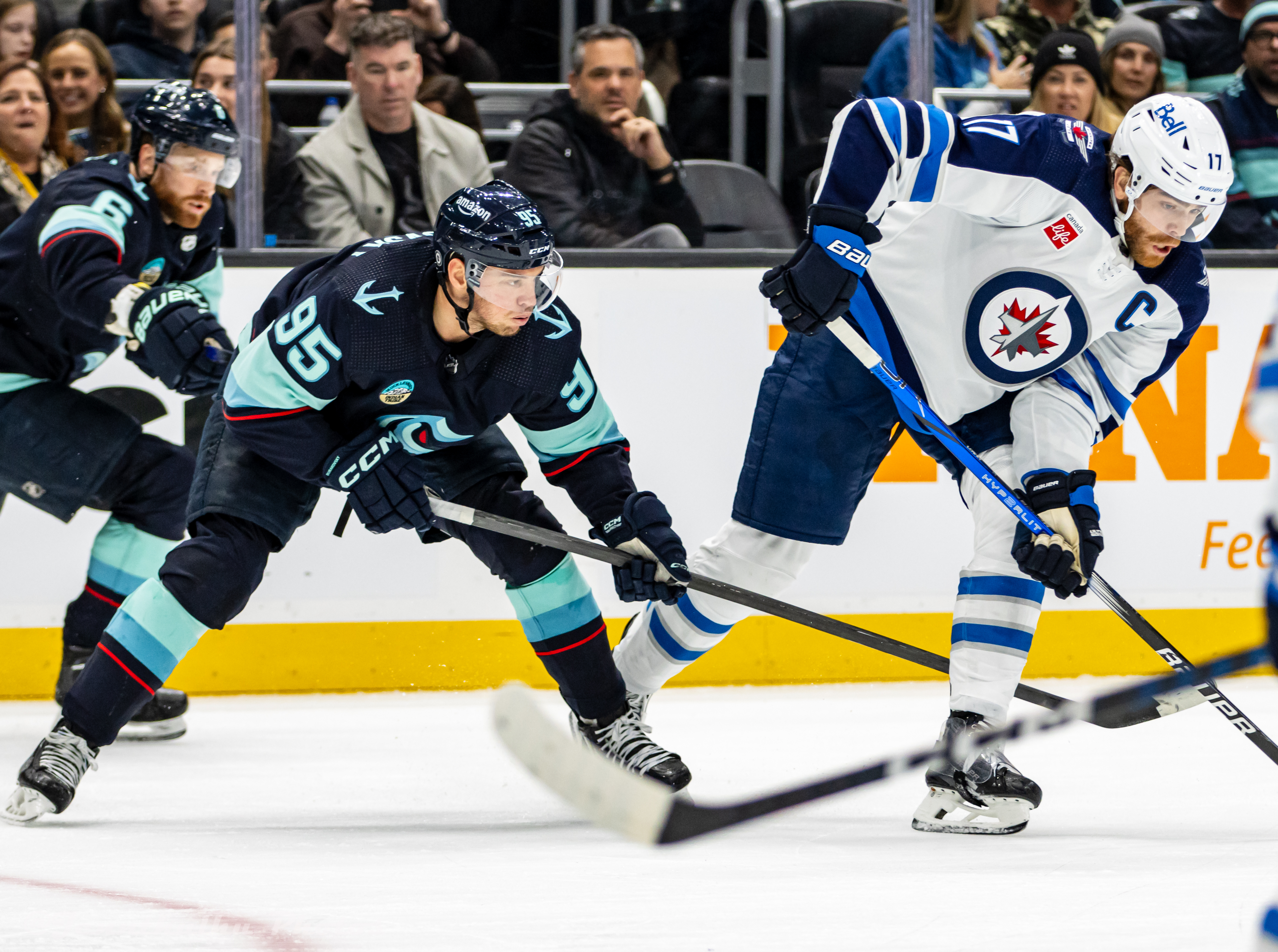
Lowry (right) in action with the Winnipeg Jets in 2024.

On April 22, 2021, Lowry suffered an injury during a game against the Toronto Maple Leafs and was unable to finish the game. Although he passed the NHL's concussion protocol, he missed the following game against the Leafs out of precaution. At the time of the injury, Lowry had tallied eight goals and 12 assists through 46 games.

Entering the 2023–24 season, Lowry was named captain of the Jets on September 12, 2023. He became the third in the team's history since relocating to Winnipeg, and the tenth overall in franchise history.

During the 2025 playoffs, the Jets matched up against the St. Louis Blues, with Lowry scoring goals in Game 1, Game 2, and the game-winning goal in double overtime of Game 7. In the Jets' second round tilt against the Dallas Stars, Lowry scored one goal in Game 2 before the Jets were eliminated in 6 games.

Lowry signed a 5-year, $25 million extension on November 19, 2025, to stay with the Jets through the 2030-31 season.

== Personal life ==
Born in St. Louis, Missouri, Lowry was raised in Calgary, Alberta, where his father, Dave, played for the Calgary Flames and later was an assistant coach for the Flames.

Lowry's older brother, Joel, is also an ice hockey player who played for Cornell University and, like Adam, was drafted in the 2011 NHL entry draft, in the fifth round, 140th overall by the Los Angeles Kings. Lowry also resided in the South Florida and Silicon Valley regions, as a result of his father's career.

== Career statistics ==
=== Regular season and playoffs ===
			Regular season					Playoffs
Season	Team	League	GP	G	A	Pts	PIM	GP	G	A	Pts	PIM
2009–10	Swift Current Broncos	WHL	61	15	19	34	57	3	0	1	1	6
2010–11	Swift Current Broncos	WHL	66	18	27	45	84	—	—	—	—	—
2011–12	Swift Current Broncos	WHL	36	12	25	37	90	—	—	—	—	—
2012–13	Swift Current Broncos	WHL	72	45	43	88	102	5	3	2	5	4
2012–13	St. John's IceCaps	AHL	9	0	1	1	4	—	—	—	—	—
2013–14	St. John's IceCaps	AHL	64	17	16	33	49	17	2	3	5	16
2014–15	Winnipeg Jets	NHL	80	11	12	23	46	4	1	2	3	2
2015–16	Winnipeg Jets	NHL	74	7	10	17	53	—	—	—	—	—
2015–16	Manitoba Moose	AHL	4	0	4	4	2	—	—	—	—	—
2016–17	Winnipeg Jets	NHL	82	15	14	29	52	—	—	—	—	—
2017–18	Winnipeg Jets	NHL	45	8	13	21	8	17	0	2	2	8
2018–19	Winnipeg Jets	NHL	78	12	11	23	33	6	1	0	1	0
2019–20	Winnipeg Jets	NHL	49	4	6	10	23	4	1	2	3	2
2020–21	Winnipeg Jets	NHL	52	10	14	24	13	8	2	2	4	0
2021–22	Winnipeg Jets	NHL	79	13	8	21	59	—	—	—	—	—
2022–23	Winnipeg Jets	NHL	82	13	23	36	48	5	4	1	5	2
2023–24	Winnipeg Jets	NHL	81	12	23	35	57	5	2	0	2	7
2024–25	Winnipeg Jets	NHL	73	16	18	34	28	13	4	0	4	16
2025–26	Winnipeg Jets	NHL	70	5	16	21	32	—	—	—	—	—
NHL totals			845	126	168	294	452	62	15	9	24	37

Medal record

Representing Canada

Ice hockey

World Championships
Silver medal – second place	2022 Finland	

=== International ===
Year	Team	Event	Result	GP	G	A	Pts	PIM
2010	Canada Pacific	U17	5th	5	1	2	3	2
2022	Canada	WC	2nd place, silver medalist(s)	10	4	5	9	4
Junior totals				5	1	2	3	2
Senior totals				10	4	5	9	4

== Awards and honours ==
Award	Year
WHL
Daryl K. (Doc) Seaman Trophy	2010
Four Broncos Memorial Trophy	2013

Awards and achievements
Preceded by Stefan Elliott	Winner of the Daryl K. (Doc) Seaman Trophy; 2010	Succeeded by Colin Smith
Sporting positions
Preceded by Blake Wheeler	Winnipeg Jets captain 2023–present	Incumbent
