= Macklin Celebrini =

Canadian ice hockey player (born 2006)

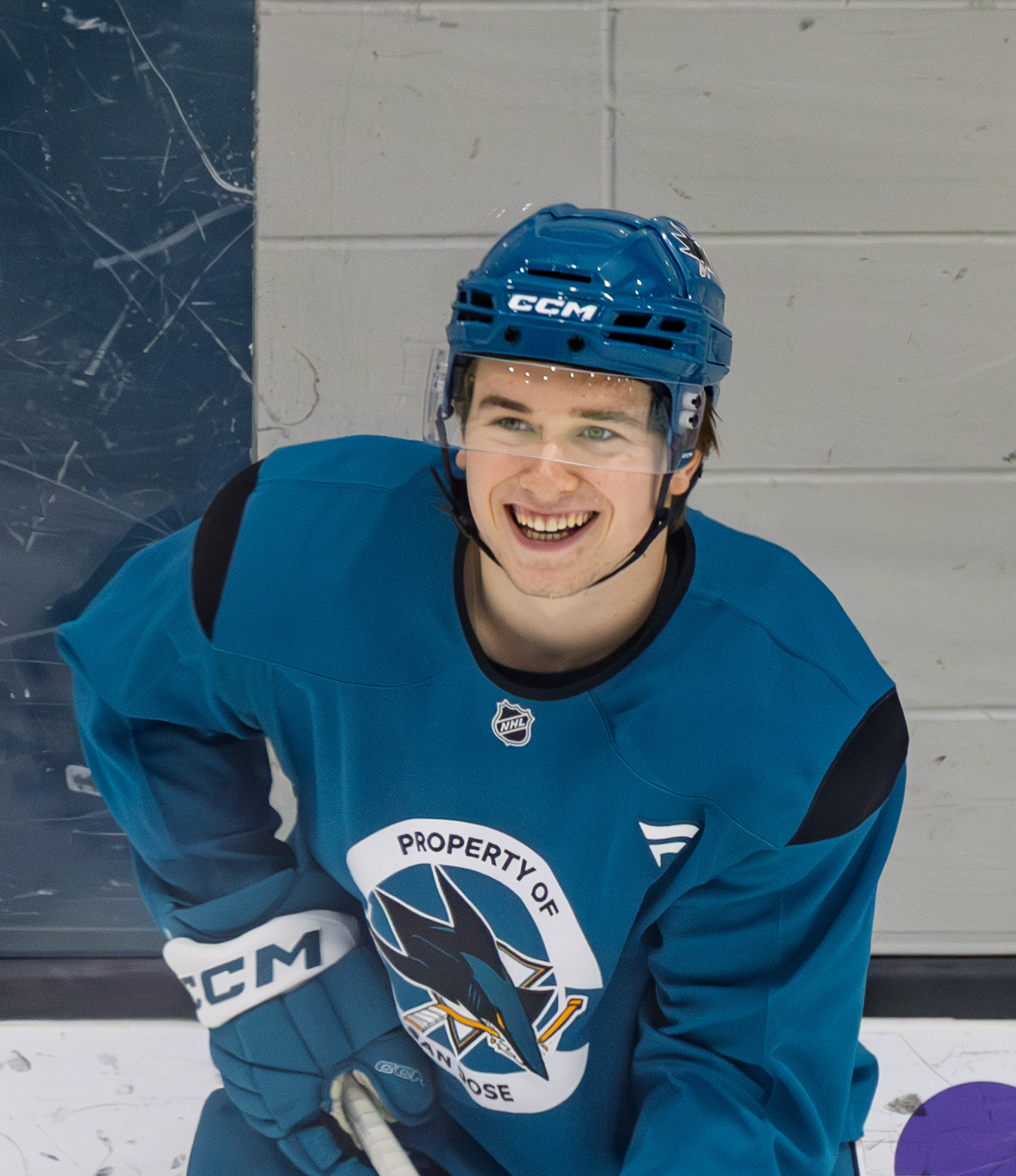
- Celebrini with the San Jose Sharks in April 2026
- Born: June 13, 2006 (age 20) North Vancouver, British Columbia, Canada
- Height: 6 ft 0 in (183 cm)
- Weight: 190 lb (86 kg; 13 st 8 lb)
- Position: Centre
- Shoots: Left
- NHL team: San Jose Sharks
- National team: Canada
- NHL draft: 1st overall, 2024; San Jose Sharks
- Playing career: 2024–present

Macklin Richard Celebrini (born June 13, 2006) is a Canadian professional ice hockey player who is a centre and captain for the San Jose Sharks of the National Hockey League (NHL). Selected first overall by the Sharks in the 2024 NHL entry draft, Celebrini made his NHL debut in the 2024–25 season and was a finalist for the Calder Memorial Trophy.

Celebrini played college ice hockey for the Boston University Terriers during the 2023–24 season, and won the Hobey Baker Award that year as a freshman, becoming the youngest player to do so at 17.

Internationally, Celebrini has represented Canada multiple times, including the 2024 World Junior Championships, the 2025 World Championship, the 2026 Winter Olympics, and the 2026 World Championship as team captain. In 2026, he became the youngest NHL player to play for Canada at the Winter Olympics.

== Early life ==
Macklin Richard Celebrini was born on June 13, 2006, in North Vancouver, British Columbia, Canada, to Robyn and Rick Celebrini. Both Robyn and Rick played soccer, Robyn playing collegiately, and Rick playing for the Canada under-20 national team and the Vancouver 86ers. After an injury, Rick became a physiotherapist, eventually working for the Vancouver Whitecaps FC, and in 2018, started working for the Golden State Warriors of the National Basketball Association (NBA) as their director of sports medicine and performance. Celebrini grew up a fan of the Vancouver Canucks, his hometown team.

Celebrini is the second of four children. His older brother, Aiden, was drafted by the Vancouver Canucks in the sixth round of the 2023 NHL entry draft. The two brothers played together for the 2023–24 college season at Boston University. His two younger siblings also play sports; his sister, Charlie, plays tennis, and his brother, R.J., plays youth ice hockey.

== Playing career ==
=== Early years ===
Celebrini started skating at only three years old. He played minor hockey in Vancouver with the North Shore Winter Club before his family moved to the San Francisco Bay Area when he was 13, where he would continue to play in USA Hockey Youth Tier I (AAA) leagues. He would spend the 2019–20 season with the San Jose Jr. Sharks 14U AAA program, leading the team with 94 points in 54 games. Celebrini then spent two seasons at Shattuck-Saint Mary's School, a boarding school in Minnesota whose elite hockey program operates under the name "Hockey Center of Excellence." During the 2020–21 season he led the 14U AAA team in assists and was second in points with 90 assists and 141 points in 50 games. The team went on to win the 2021 Youth Tier I 14U National Championship. In the 2021–22 season, at just 15 years old, he played with the 18U-Prep team where he led the team during the regular season in both points and assists with 117 points and 67 assists in 52 games. The team went on to win the 2022 Prep Hockey Conference Championship.

For the 2022–23 season, at age 16, Celebrini signed with the Chicago Steel of the United States Hockey League (USHL). He won the scoring title with 86 points (46 goals, 40 assists) in 50 games, leading all USHL players in both points and goals. Celebrini broke the record for most points ever by an under-17 player in USHL history. He also broke the Steel franchise record for most single-season power play goals with 21 and most goals in a game with 5. After helping the Steel reach the USHL's Eastern Conference finals, Celebrini was named Player of the Year, Rookie of the Year, and Forward of the Year, becoming the second USHL player to win all three awards and the first to do so in a single season. Celebrini was also named to the All-USHL and All-Rookie first teams.

=== College ===
Celebrini committed to play for Boston University for the 2023–24 season at just 17, playing alongside his older brother, Aiden. During his freshman year, he led the nation in points per game (1.69) and finished the season ranked second in the country in goals (32) and third in points (63) in just 38 games. He won Hockey East Player of the Year, Hockey East Rookie of the Year, Hockey East Scoring Champion, and the Hockey East Three-Stars Award, while also earning Hockey East First Team All-Star and All-Rookie Teams honours. He became just the fourth player in NCAA history to win Hockey East Player of the Year and Hockey East Rookie of the Year in the same season. Celebrini was further recognized nationally as a First Team All-American and the NCAA Tim Taylor National Rookie of the Year, and regionally as the New England Rookie of the Year and a New England Division I All-Star. He was the fourth freshman since 2000 to record at least 30 goals and 30 assists in a single season. Celebrini capped off his season by winning the Hobey Baker Award, becoming the youngest player to win the award, and the fourth freshman to do so, following Paul Kariya in 1993, Jack Eichel in 2015 and Adam Fantilli in 2023.

=== Professional ===
Celebrini was drafted first overall in the 2024 NHL entry draft by the San Jose Sharks, signing a three-year, entry-level contract with the Sharks on July 6, 2024. He made his NHL debut on October 10, recording both his first goal and first assist in a 5–4 overtime loss to the St. Louis Blues. His goal, scored at 7:01 into the first period, made him the second-fastest first overall pick to score his first NHL goal, behind only Mario Lemieux, and his two points made him the youngest player in NHL history to record a multi-point game in his debut. Celebrini had sustained a lower-body injury in the preseason and reaggravated it during his debut; he was then placed on injured reserve on October 12, missing 12 games before returning to the lineup on November 5. On November 7, he recorded his first multi-goal game against the Minnesota Wild, becoming only the third player in Sharks franchise history to do so before the age of 19. Celebrini led all NHL forwards in puck battle wins per game during November and was named November Rookie of the Month after leading all rookies in goals, points, game-winning goals, and shots on goal. On December 23, he recorded two assists against the Vancouver Canucks in his first NHL game in his hometown, giving him 25 points in his first 25 games; he was the first NHL rookie since Connor McDavid, and the 10th in league history to reach that mark. On January 16, 2025, against the Columbus Blue Jackets, Celebrini became the fastest rookie in Sharks history to reach 40 points, doing so in only 45 games. On April 9, two days after breaking the Sharks' rookie assists record, Celebrini scored his first NHL hat-trick against the Wild, becoming the first rookie to do so in the 2024–25 season, and setting the Sharks' single-season rookie points record in the same game.

Celebrini finished his rookie season with 63 points (25 goals, 38 assists) in 70 games. He led the Sharks in points and was second on the team in both goals and assists. His 25 goals were also the most ever by an 18-year-old in Sharks history. Among all rookies, he ranked second in goals behind Matvei Michkov, and tied Michkov for second in points behind Lane Hutson. Celebrini placed third in voting for the Calder Memorial Trophy, awarded to the NHL's best rookie, and was unanimously named to the league's All-Rookie Team. During the summer of 2025, Celebrini and fellow North Vancouver native Connor Bedard of the Chicago Blackhawks trained together in their hometown, with Celebrini stating that both players learned from each other. In July 2025, Celebrini and Sharks teammate Will Smith trained for a week in Halifax with Sidney Crosby and Nathan MacKinnon, both of whom had played alongside Celebrini for Canada in May at the 2025 World Championship.

On October 8, 2025, Celebrini was named one of the home alternate captains ahead of the 2025–26 season, becoming the youngest alternate captain in Sharks franchise history at 19 years old. Celebrini opened the 2025–26 season with 23 points in his first 15 games, briefly leading the NHL in scoring and becoming the third teenager in NHL history to reach that mark, after Wayne Gretzky and Steve Yzerman. On October 23, he recorded a hat-trick and two assists in a five-point night against the New York Rangers in the Sharks' first win of the season, and on November 18 he added another hat-trick, including the overtime winner, in a 3–2 win against the Utah Mammoth. On November 29, Celebrini reached 100 career NHL points with an assist, becoming the second-fastest Shark overall and the fastest Sharks draft pick to do so. On December 16, he recorded two goals and two assists in a 6–3 win over the Calgary Flames to become the third-fastest teenager in league history, behind Crosby and Gretzky, to reach 50 points in a season. Three days later, he passed Gretzky for the second-most points by a teenager before the Christmas break, with 53 points in 35 games. On December 29, Celebrini recorded a goal and two assists against the Anaheim Ducks, giving him 60 points in 39 games, the most by a teenager before New Year's Day in NHL history. He had a 13-game point streak that ended on January 11, 2026, tying Nathan MacKinnon for the second-longest by a teenager in NHL history behind Patrik Laine, and Mikael Granlund for the second-longest in Sharks franchise history. Celebrini and Will Smith became the second-highest-scoring under-21 teammate duo in NHL history, factoring into 55 goals together before Smith turned 21 on March 17, behind only Patrick Kane and Jonathan Toews, who combined on 64. Celebrini became the sixth teenager in NHL history, after Gretzky, Dale Hawerchuk, Mario Lemieux, Jimmy Carson, and Crosby, to record 100 points in a season when he scored against the St. Louis Blues on March 30. On April 16, the final game of the regular season, Celebrini recorded a goal and two assists against the Winnipeg Jets to reach 115 points and become the Sharks' single-season points leader, surpassing Joe Thornton's record of 114. The two assists also made Celebrini the only teenager besides Gretzky to record at least 40 goals and 70 assists in a single season.

Celebrini was one of only four Sharks to have played all 82 games that season. He finished with 115 points (45 goals, 70 assists), 56 points ahead of the Sharks' next-highest scorer, which was the widest gap between any NHL team's top two scorers since 1990–91. Celebrini also factored into 46.2% of the Sharks' goals, second in the NHL behind that season's Art Ross Trophy winner Connor McDavid, and surpassing Gretzky's teenage mark of 45.5%. Celebrini finished fourth in league scoring and fourth in the Hart Memorial Trophy voting, and was named a finalist for the Ted Lindsay Award, given by the National Hockey League Players' Association (NHLPA) to the "most outstanding" player in the NHL.

On July 29, 2026, less than a month after becoming eligible for a contract extension, Celebrini signed a five-year, $94 million contract with the Sharks, worth $18.8 million annually, to start in the 2027–28 season. Two months later, on September 25, he was named the 11th full-time (14th overall) captain in Sharks history, succeeding Logan Couture. Celebrini became the youngest captain in Sharks franchise history, the sixth-youngest captain in NHL history, and the youngest active captain in the NHL for the 2026–27 season, at only 20 years old.

On November 12, Celebrini scored his 200th career NHL point with a goal against the Pittsburgh Penguins, becoming the fifth-youngest player in NHL history and the youngest player in Sharks history to reach the milestone. Doing so in 171 games, Celebrini became the fastest player among those who began their NHL careers with the Sharks and the second-fastest overall in Sharks history to reach 200 points with the franchise.

== International play ==
Medal record

Men's ice hockey

Representing Canada

Winter Olympics
Silver medal – second place	2026 Milano Cortina	

World U18 Championships
Bronze medal – third place	2023 Switzerland	

Celebrini made his international debut for Canada with the under-17 team in the 2022 World U-17 Hockey Challenge. The following year, he was named to the under-18 team for the 2023 World U18 Championships, where he scored the bronze medal-winning goal against Slovakia in overtime. Celebrini later played with the junior team at the 2024 World Junior Championships, leading the team in scoring with four goals and four assists.

Following the conclusion of his collegiate season, Celebrini accepted an invitation to make his senior team debut at the 2024 World Championship, but was dropped from the roster following the addition of NHL players whose teams were eliminated in the first round of the 2024 Stanley Cup playoffs. He made his debut the following year at the 2025 World Championship, recording three goals and three assists for a total of six points in eight games for Canada, with the team finishing in fifth place.

Celebrini was invited to Hockey Canada's 2025 National Teams Orientation Camp in anticipation of the 2026 Winter Olympics as the youngest player to be considered for the senior team at the time. On December 31, 2025, Celebrini was named to Canada's roster for the Winter Olympics, making him the youngest-ever NHL player to be named to the Canadian men's Olympic team. In Milan, Celebrini assumed a key role for Canada in the tournament, playing on the team's top line alongside Connor McDavid and Nathan MacKinnon. He opened the scoring for Canada in a 5–0 win over the Czech Republic, surpassing Jonathan Toews to become the youngest Canadian NHL player to score an Olympic goal. In the preliminary game against France, Celebrini became the first NHL player to score a penalty-shot goal in Olympics history. In the semifinal round, he recorded the most ice-time of any Canadian player in their 3–2 comeback victory over Finland. Canada was ultimately defeated by the United States in the finals, receiving the silver medal. Overall, Celebrini recorded five goals and five assists for 10 points in six games. He set the record for most goals and points by a teenager in an Olympic tournament with NHL players and finished as the tournament's leading goal scorer, ranking second in points overall, and was named to the Olympic All-Star Team.

Celebrini returned to Canada's roster for the 2026 World Championship as the team's captain, making him the second-youngest player to ever captain Canada's senior team after Roy Heximer, who was named captain aged 18 during the 1938 World Championship. Celebrini was voted to remain captain after Sidney Crosby, the national team captain for several international competitions starting from the 2014 Winter Olympics, was added to the roster after the Pittsburgh Penguins were eliminated from the 2026 Stanley Cup playoffs. Canada ultimately reached the bronze medal game, losing in an upset to Norway. Celebrini led the team with 14 points in 10 games, and was named the Best Forward of the tournament, as well as to the All-Star Team.

On July 9, 2026, Celebrini was named the IIHF Male Player of the Year for the 2025–26 season, receiving 40.8% of the vote.

== Personal life ==
Celebrini is of Croatian descent through his paternal grandfather, Anton Celebrini, who was born in Porat, a village on the island of Krk.

Celebrini lived with former San Jose Sharks captain Joe Thornton and his family for his first two seasons in the NHL. As of August 2026 he lives with teammate and close friend Will Smith.

Following his selection in the 2024 draft, Celebrini signed an endorsement agreement with CCM Hockey, joining the company's "Pro Roster" as an exclusive brand ambassador. He also serves as a brand ambassador for Chipotle, Sony, and Lululemon. In May 2026, he partnered with Airbnb for a promotional campaign tied to the 2026 FIFA World Cup match held in Toronto, hosting a specialized soccer camp. In September 2026, Celebrini signed a marketing partnership with Tim Hortons, appearing in televised commercials and digital campaigns as one of the faces of the 2026–27 Upper Deck Hockey Card Collection and "Next Gen Phenoms" insert cards.

Celebrini serves as the Pacific region ambassador for the Kruger Big Assist program, which supports minor hockey associations in Canada. He is also a brand ambassador with OpenRoad Foundation, supporting philanthropic initiatives across British Columbia and Ontario.

On June 14, 2026, Celebrini was announced as the cover athlete of NHL 27, becoming the youngest player to appear on the cover and the first Shark to do so since Owen Nolan in NHL 2001. On August 15, a one-of-one Celebrini rookie card from Upper Deck's 2024–25 Young Guns Outburst Gold set sold at auction for $1.28 million, the highest publicly recorded sale for an ice hockey card featuring any player other than Wayne Gretzky.

== Career statistics ==
=== Regular season and playoffs ===
			Regular season					Playoffs
Season	Team	League	GP	G	A	Pts	PIM	GP	G	A	Pts	PIM
2021–22	Shattuck-Saint Mary's	USHS-Prep	52	50	67	117	44	11	8	12	20	12
2022–23	Chicago Steel	USHL	50	46	40	86	62	2	0	0	0	2
2023–24	Boston University	NCAA-HE	38	32	32	64	18	—	—	—	—	—
2024–25	San Jose Sharks	NHL	70	25	38	63	28	—	—	—	—	—
2025–26	San Jose Sharks	NHL	82	45	70	115	44	—	—	—	—	—
NHL totals			152	70	108	178	72	—	—	—	—	—

=== International ===
Year	Team	Event	Result	GP	G	A	Pts	PIM
2022	Canada Black	U17	4th	4	1	1	2	0
2023	Canada	U18	3rd place, bronze medalist(s)	7	6	9	15	6
2024	Canada	WJC	5th	5	4	4	8	0
2025	Canada	WC	5th	8	3	3	6	0
2026	Canada	OG	2nd place, silver medalist(s)	6	5	5	10	4
2026	Canada	WC	4th	10	6	8	14	4
Junior totals				16	11	14	25	6
Senior totals				24	14	16	30	8

== Awards and honours ==
Award	Year	Ref
USHL
USHL Player of the Year	2023	
USHL Rookie of the Year	2023	
USHL Forward of the Year	2023	
All-USHL First Team	2023	
USHL All-Rookie First Team	2023	
College
All-Hockey East First Team	2024	
Hockey East All-Rookie Team	2024	
Hockey East Scoring Champion	2024	
Hockey East Three-Stars Award	2024	
Hockey East Rookie of the Year	2024	
Hockey East Player of the Year	2024	
Tim Taylor Award	2024	
Hobey Baker Award	2024	
AHCA East First Team All-American	2024	
NHL
NHL All-Rookie Team	2025	
EA Sports NHL cover athlete	2027	
San Jose Sharks
Sharks Player of the Year	2025, 2026	
Sharks Rookie of the Year	2025	
International
Winter Olympics All-Star Team	2026	
World Championship Best Forward	2026	
World Championship All-Star Team	2026	
IIHF Male Player of the Year	2026	

Awards and achievements
Preceded by Devon Levi	Hockey East Player of the Year; 2023–24	Succeeded by Ryan Leonard
Preceded by Lane Hutson	Hockey East Rookie of the Year; 2023–24	Succeeded by Cole Hutson
Preceded by Lane Hutson	Hockey East Three-Stars Award; 2023–24	Succeeded by Ryan Leonard
Preceded by Lane Hutson	Hockey East Scoring Champion; 2023–24	Succeeded by Ryan Leonard
Preceded by Adam Fantilli	Tim Taylor Award; 2023–24	Succeeded by Cole Hutson
Preceded by Adam Fantilli	Hobey Baker Award; 2023–24	Succeeded by Isaac Howard
Preceded by Connor Bedard	NHL first overall draft pick 2024	Succeeded by Matthew Schaefer
Preceded by Quentin Musty	San Jose Sharks first-round draft pick 2024	Succeeded by Sam Dickinson
Sporting positions
Preceded by Logan Couture	San Jose Sharks captain 2026–present	Incumbent
