= Roman Červenka =

Czech ice hockey player (born 1985)

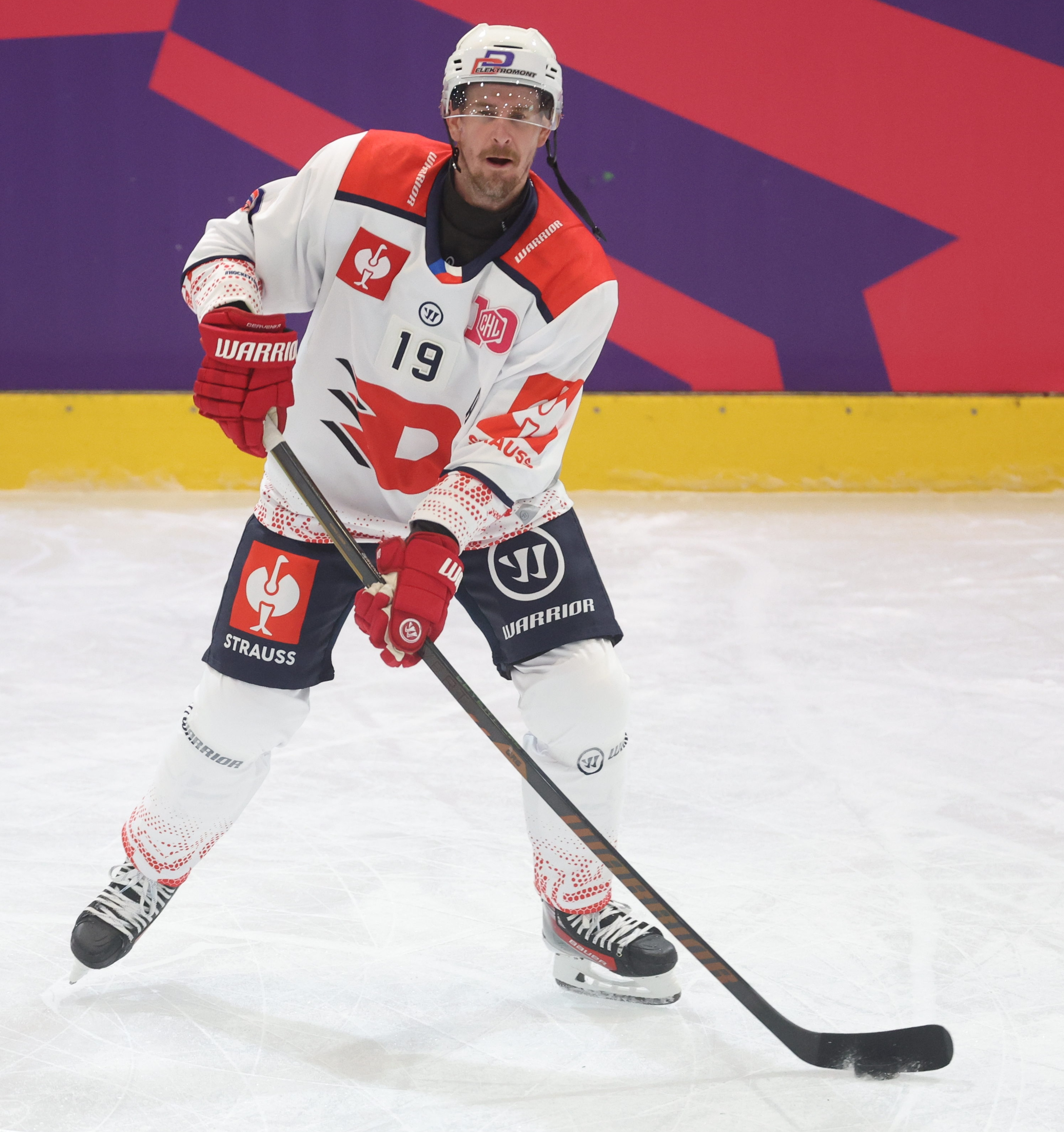
- Červenka in 2024
- Born: 10 December 1985 (age 40) Prague, Czechoslovakia
- Height: 5 ft 11 in (180 cm)
- Weight: 201 lb (91 kg; 14 st 5 lb)
- Position: Centre
- Shoots: Left
- ELH team Former teams: HC Dynamo Pardubice; Slavia Praha; Avangard Omsk; Lev Praha; Calgary Flames; SKA Saint Petersburg; Piráti Chomutov; Fribourg-Gottéron; ZSC Lions; SC Rapperswil-Jona Lakers
- National team: Czech Republic
- NHL draft: Undrafted
- Playing career: 2003–present

Roman Červenka (born 10 December 1985) is a Czech professional ice hockey player who is a centre for HC Dynamo Pardubice of the Czech Extraliga (ELH). He formerly played for Piráti Chomutov and Slavia Praha of the Czech Extraliga, Avangard Omsk, Lev Praha and SKA Saint Petersburg of the Kontinental Hockey League (KHL). He was the leading goal scorer in the KHL in 2010–11 and was named to the All-Star team in 2011–12 before moving to North America after signing a contract with the National Hockey League (NHL)'s Calgary Flames. He played 39 games in the NHL during the 2012–13 season before returning to Europe.

Internationally, Červenka has played with the Czech Republic national team on several occasions, winning a bronze medal at the 2005 World Junior Championships, gold and bronze at the 2010 and 2011 World Championships, respectively. Additionally, he also represented his country at the Olympic Games each time since 2010. He has served as the team's captain at the World Championships each year since 2022.

== Playing career ==
Červenka began playing with Slavia Praha's junior teams, playing for the under-18 team in 2000–01 and 2001–02, and the under-20 team in 2002–03 and 2003–04. During the 2003–04 season, he also made his Czech Extraliga debut, playing 15 games with the top-level team. After playing for various junior-level and 1 Liga teams during the 2004–05 and 2005–06 seasons, Červenka rejoined Slavia Praha in 2006–07. In 2008–09, he scored 59 points (28 goals and 31 assists) in 51 games.

Červenka has represented the Czech Republic with the national team on multiple occasions. He earned a bronze medal at the 2005 World Junior Championships. He also played at the 2009 IIHF World Championship and was selected to play for the 2010 Winter Olympics. At the time of the Olympic team selection, Červenka led the Extraliga with 55 points in 35 games.

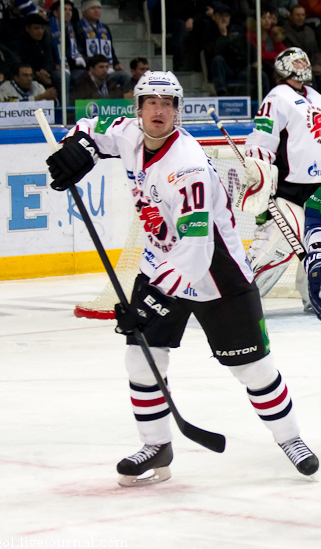
Červenka in 2011.

On 25 May 2010, Červenka signed a two-year contract with Russian club Avangard Omsk of the Kontinental Hockey League (KHL). He earned a place on the left wing of the first line alongside his countryman Jaromír Jágr and established himself as a prolific KHL scoring forward. In his first season in the league, Červenka was selected to play in the Kontinental Hockey League All-Star Game, collecting more fan votes than any other skater in the league. Having scored 31 times in the 2010–11 season, Červenka earned the Top Goalscorer award from the KHL.

On 2 May 2012, Červenka signed a one-year contract with a base salary of $975,000 and a maximum of $3.775 million with the Calgary Flames of the National Hockey League (NHL). His debut with the team was delayed by the 2012–13 NHL lockout, during which he returned to play for Slavia Praha. He appeared in 9 games for the team, scoring 13 points. He left the team due to injury, then returned to action with Lev Praha of the KHL, but suffered another injury after only five games. He was further sidelined by a blood clot issue that left him out of the Flames' lineup to start the 2012–13 NHL season. Červenka missed the first three games of the season before making his NHL debut on 26 January 2013 in a 4–3 victory over the Edmonton Oilers. He scored his first NHL point (an assist) in the following game, against the Colorado Avalanche. Červenka's year with the Flames was disappointing largely due to missing training camp, subpar conditioning, struggling with the English language and coaches finding his defensive zone play to be a liability.

On 16 May 2013, Červenka returned to the KHL after signing a three-year contract with SKA Saint Petersburg. He left after two years and then spent the 2015–16 season with Piráti Chomutov of the Czech Extraliga; he scored 23 goals and provided 38 assists in 49 games during the regular season, ranking first in league scoring.

In March 2016, he signed with HC Fribourg-Gottéron of the Swiss National League (NL). After two seasons in Fribourg, on 23 May 2018, Červenka joined ZSC Lions on a one-year contract. On 20 June 2019, Červenka signed a one-year contract with his third Swiss club, SC Rapperswil-Jona Lakers, to remain in the NL. Červenka played for five years for the Lakers, serving as captain for the 2022-23 season, before returning to the ELH by signing a two-year deal with HC Dynamo Pardubice.

Serving as an alternate captain for Pardubice, Červenka would finish 5th in the league in points, with 46. He would also be a core part of the team for their playoff run, where he would lead the league in playoff assists and points, with 14 and 19, respectively, to Pardubice run to the finals, where they would fall to HC Kometa Brno in seven games. In his second season with the team, Červenka would lead the league in both points in assists in the regular season, scoring 19 goals and 41 assists for 60 points in 43 games, helping him earn him the league MVP award. For the second straight season, Červenka would have an outstanding playoff run, and help lead Pardubice to the finals. He would score 14 goals and 11 assists for 25 points in 17 games, good for leading the league in playoff goals, as well as playoff points for the second straight season. This time, fortune was in Červenka and Pardubice's favor, as they would win the league, capping off a great season. Červenka would also win playoff MVP for his efforts.

== Personal life ==
Červenka is Orthodox Christian, after Jaromír Jágr took him to churches in Omsk where he would be baptized. His younger brother Marek (born 1992) is a professional football player.

== International play ==
Medal record

Representing Czech Republic

World Championships
Gold medal – first place	2010 Germany	
Gold medal – first place	2024 Czechia	
Bronze medal – third place	2011 Slovakia	
Bronze medal – third place	2022 Finland	

World Junior Championships
Bronze medal – third place	2005 United States	

Červenka has had a decorated career with the Czech Republic national team. He first represented the country at the 2005 World Junior Ice Hockey Championships, where he won bronze. Since then, he has represented Czechia in multiple international tournaments, including the Ice Hockey World Championships and the Olympic Games. In additional to this, he has served as captain for the team on multiple occasions. He first served as captain at the 2008 IIHF World Championships. He also served as captain at the 2022 and 2026 Winter Olympics, and has been the captain of the team at the World Championships since 2022. On May 17, 2025, during the 2025 World Championships, Červenka became the fifth player to play in 100 games for either the Czech Republic or Czechoslovakia at the World Championships, scoring a hat-trick in a victory against Kazakhstan.

Červenka won gold with the Czech national team at the 2010 World Championships, and bronze the year later in 2011. As captain, he helped lead the team to the bronze at the 2022 World Championships, and gold in 2024, with the latter being in his home country.

Following the 2024 World Championship, where he finished tied for fourth in the tournament in scoring with 11 points, and tied for second with eight assists, Červenka was named a Media All Star for the tournament, and was also named the 2024 IIHF Male Player of the Year.

Červenka is the Czech Republic's all-time leading scorer at the Ice Hockey World Championships, and also holds the record for scoring the most points for the team in the tournament, when he scored 18 points at the 2022 World Championship.

== Career statistics ==
=== Regular season and playoffs ===
Bold indicates led league

			Regular season					Playoffs
Season	Team	League	GP	G	A	Pts	PIM	GP	G	A	Pts	PIM
2000–01	HC Slavia Praha	CZE U18	41	4	8	12	14	2	0	0	0	2
2001–02	HC Slavia Praha	CZE U18	41	30	23	53	36	2	1	0	1	2
2002–03	HC Slavia Praha	CZE U20	48	19	13	32	44	3	0	1	1	6
2003–04	HC Slavia Praha	CZE U20	34	20	33	53	90	2	0	1	1	0
2003–04	HC Slavia Praha	ELH	15	0	1	1	2	—	—	—	—	—
2003–04	HC Kometa Brno	CZE-2	3	1	1	2	2	—	—	—	—	—
2004–05	HC Slavia Praha	CZE U20	9	3	5	8	22	—	—	—	—	—
2004–05	HC VČE Hradec Králové, a.s.	CZE-2	23	15	8	**23**	28	—	—	—	—	—
2004–05	HC Rebel Havlíčkův Brod	CZE-3	1	0	1	1	0	12	6	1	7	20
2005–06	HC Slavia Praha	CZE U20	10	6	6	12	6	—	—	—	—	—
2005–06	HC Slavia Praha	ELH	22	0	0	0	12	—	—	—	—	—
2005–06	HC VČE Hradec Králové, a.s.	CZE-2	7	1	2	3	14	—	—	—	—	—
2005–06	HC Slovan Ústečtí Lvi	CZE-2 U20	2	1	3	4	0	—	—	—	—	—
2005–06	HC Slovan Ústečtí Lvi	CZE-2	23	7	6	13	22	11	1	3	4	16
2006–07	HC Slavia Praha	ELH	51	6	6	12	54	6	3	1	4	6
2007–08	HC Slavia Praha	ELH	41	19	11	30	72	14	4	4	8	20
2008–09	HC Slavia Praha	ELH	51	28	31	59	56	18	**13**	11	**24**	20
2009–10	HC Slavia Praha	ELH	50	30	**43**	**73**	56	16	9	**15**	**24**	34
2010–11	Avangard Omsk	KHL	51	**31**	30	61	56	12	5	4	9	4
2011–12	Avangard Omsk	KHL	54	23	16	39	18	20	11	10	**21**	4
2012–13	HC Slavia Praha	ELH	9	5	8	13	14	—	—	—	—	—
2012–13	HC Lev Praha	KHL	5	1	2	3	2	—	—	—	—	—
2012–13	Calgary Flames	NHL	39	9	8	17	14	—	—	—	—	—
2013–14	SKA Saint Petersburg	KHL	53	14	25	39	34	10	6	11	17	8
2014–15	SKA Saint Petersburg	KHL	55	13	23	36	22	22	2	5	7	10
2015–16	Piráti Chomutov	ELH	49	23	**38**	**61**	96	8	3	6	9	12
2016–17	HC Fribourg–Gottéron	NLA	44	16	35	51	32	—	—	—	—	—
2017–18	HC Fribourg–Gottéron	NL	32	13	24	37	28	5	1	4	5	4
2018–19	ZSC Lions	NL	22	5	16	21	8	—	—	—	—	—
2019–20	SC Rapperswil–Jona Lakers	NL	32	14	27	41	30	—	—	—	—	—
2020–21	SC Rapperswil–Jona Lakers	NL	49	16	35	51	63	9	1	6	7	10
2021–22	SC Rapperswil–Jona Lakers	NL	52	20	44	**64**	30	7	2	4	6	4
2022–23	SC Rapperswil–Jona Lakers	NL	43	16	**43**	**59**	60	6	1	2	3	8
2023–24	SC Rapperswil–Jona Lakers	NL	47	12	28	40	28	—	—	—	—	—
2024–25	HC Dynamo Pardubice	ELH	50	19	27	46	14	15	5	**14**	**19**	12
2025–26	HC Dynamo Pardubice	ELH	43	19	**41**	**60**	28	17	**14**	11	**25**	4
ELH totals			381	149	206	355	404	102	51	62	113	110
KHL totals			218	82	96	178	132	64	24	30	54	26
NHL totals			39	9	8	17	14	—	—	—	—	—
NL totals			321	112	252	364	279	27	5	16	21	26

=== International ===
Bold indicates led tournament

Year	Team	Event	Result	GP	G	A	Pts	PIM
2005	Czech Republic	WJC	3rd place, bronze medalist(s)	7	1	0	1	8
2009	Czech Republic	WC	6th	7	2	1	3	2
2010	Czech Republic	OG	7th	5	0	2	2	0
2010	Czech Republic	WC	1st place, gold medalist(s)	9	1	1	2	2
2011	Czech Republic	WC	3rd place, bronze medalist(s)	9	4	6	10	4
2014	Czech Republic	OG	6th	5	2	0	2	2
2014	Czech Republic	WC	4th	10	2	3	5	4
2015	Czech Republic	WC	4th	10	2	3	5	0
2016	Czech Republic	WC	5th	8	2	5	7	2
2016	Czech Republic	WCH	6th	2	0	0	0	0
2017	Czech Republic	WC	7th	8	3	3	6	4
2018	Czech Republic	OG	4th	6	3	1	4	4
2018	Czech Republic	WC	7th	8	0	2	2	8
2022	Czechia	OG	9th	4	2	3	5	0
2022	Czechia	WC	3rd place, bronze medalist(s)	10	5	**12**	**17**	10
2023	Czechia	WC	8th	8	3	6	9	0
2024	Czechia	WC	1st place, gold medalist(s)	10	3	8	11	4
2025	Czechia	WC	6th	8	6	8	14	4
2026	Czechia	OG	8th	5	2	3	5	2
2026	Czechia	WC	5th	8	2	3	5	2
Junior totals				7	1	0	1	8
Senior totals				140	44	70	114	54

== Awards and honours ==
Award	Year
CZE-2
Czechia2 Champion	2006
ELH
Czech Extraliga Champion	2008, 2026
Czech Extraliga Player of the Year	2015–16
Czech Extraliga MVP	2025-26
Czech Extraliga Playoff MVP	2026
KHL
KHL Best Sniper Award	2010–11
KHL First All-Star Team	2011–12
Golden Helmet Award	2011–12
KHL All-Star Game	2011, 2012
Gagarin Cup champion	2015
NL
NL Media All-Star Team	2021–22, 2022–23
NL Media Best Forward	2021–22, 2022–23
NL Media MVP	2021–22, 2022–23
NL MVP	2021–22, 2022–23
International
World Championship All-Star Team	2022
World Championship Top 3 Player on Team	2022, 2024, 2025, 2026
World Championship All-Star Team	2024
IIHF Male Player of the Year	2024
Czech Republic
Medal of Merit	2024
