= IIHF Male Player of the Year =

International ice hockey award

- Sport: Ice hockey
- Awarded for: Annually to the player who "best exemplifies exceptional skill, determination, team success, and sporting character on and off the ice during the preceding season."

History
- First award: 2023
- First winner: Connor Bedard
- Most recent: Macklin Celebrini (2026)

The IIHF Male Player of the Year award is given out annually by the International Ice Hockey Federation (IIHF), in recognition of the ice hockey player who "best exemplifies exceptional skill, determination, team success, and sporting character on and off the ice during the preceding season." It is selected by a panel of media and IIHF representatives drawn from among the member states of the International Ice Hockey Federation.

In order to be eligible, a player must have competed in at least one of four IIHF tournaments (the Winter Olympics, IIHF World Championships, IIHF World Junior Championships, or IIHF World U18 Championships) as well as in a national domestic league "of the highest caliber for that country," with "the combined performances of which were deemed superior to all other players."

It was first awarded in 2023, along with its counterpart, the IIHF Female Player of the Year. Connor Bedard, of the Canadian national junior team and the WHL's Regina Pats, was the inaugural recipient.

== Winners ==
Year	Winner	National Team	Club	Ref
2023	Connor Bedard	Canada U20	Regina Pats (WHL)	
2024	Roman Červenka	Czech Republic	SC Rapperswil-Jona Lakers (NL)	
2025	Sven Andrighetto	Switzerland	ZSC Lions (NL)	
2026	Macklin Celebrini	Canada	San Jose Sharks (NHL)	

== See also ==
- IIHF Female Player of the Year
