= Connor Bedard =

Canadian ice hockey player (born 2005)

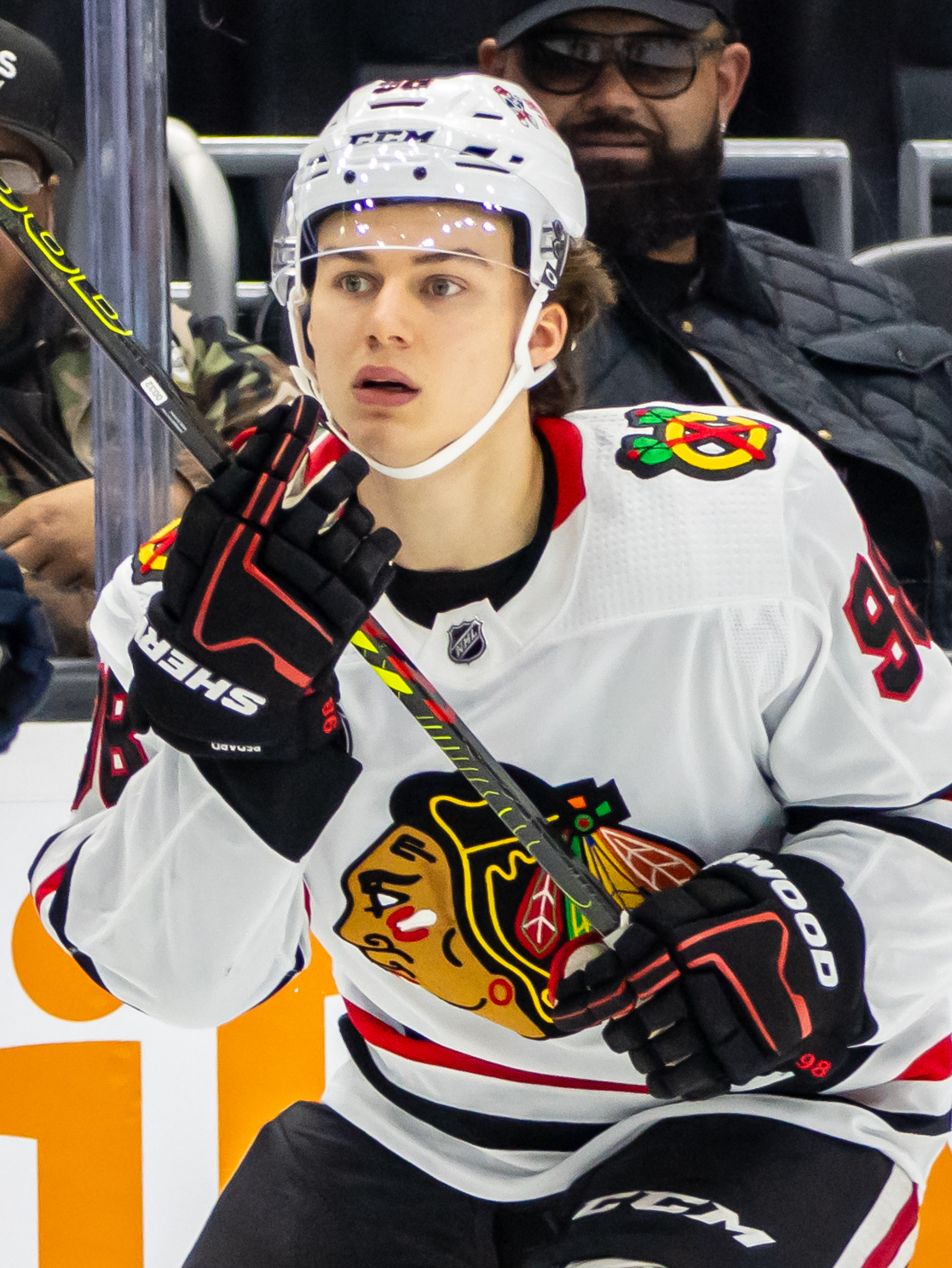
- Bedard with the Chicago Blackhawks in December 2023
- Born: July 17, 2005 (age 21) North Vancouver, British Columbia, Canada
- Height: 5 ft 10 in (178 cm)
- Weight: 190 lb (86 kg; 13 st 8 lb)
- Position: Centre
- Shoots: Right
- NHL team: Chicago Blackhawks
- National team: Canada
- NHL draft: 1st overall, 2023; Chicago Blackhawks
- Playing career: 2023–present

Connor Thomas Bedard (born July 17, 2005) is a Canadian professional ice hockey player who is a centre and captain for the Chicago Blackhawks of the National Hockey League (NHL). Considered one of the top ice hockey prospects of his generation, he was selected first overall by the Blackhawks in the 2023 NHL entry draft and made his NHL debut that year. Bedard would go on to win the Calder Memorial Trophy as rookie of the year in 2024.

Bedard was selected by the Regina Pats of the Western Hockey League (WHL) first overall in the WHL bantam draft in 2020 as the first WHL player of exceptional player status and won the Jim Piggott Memorial Trophy as the league's top rookie player in his debut season. In his third year in the WHL, he won the Bob Clarke Trophy as the league's leading scorer and was given the Four Broncos Memorial Trophy as its most valuable player, before also earning the Canadian Hockey League's Top Scorer and Player of the Year honours.

Competing internationally for Canada, Bedard won championships with the Canadian national under-18 team in 2021 and with the Canadian national junior team in 2022 and 2023. His 2023 tournament performance set several national and international points records and led to him being named the event's MVP. Bedard was the inaugural recipient of the IIHF Male Player of the Year award.

== Early life ==
Connor Thomas Bedard was born on July 17, 2005, and grew up in North Vancouver, British Columbia, with his parents, Tom and Melanie, and sister Madi. Connor's great-great uncle James Bedard played 22 NHL games for Chicago between 1949 and 1951. In 2018, Bedard emerged as a young hockey prospect, being named "The Future of Hockey" in an article by The Hockey News. Bedard played minor hockey with West Vancouver Academy Prep of the Canadian Sport School Hockey League. While playing with this school's U15 and U18 teams, Bedard led the league in goals and points and was named most valuable player both years. Bedard grew up a fan of the Vancouver Canucks and went to home games at Rogers Arena several times, but considered Sidney Crosby his childhood idol.

== Playing career ==
=== Regina Pats (2020–2023) ===
In March 2020, Bedard was granted exceptional player status by Hockey Canada, allowing him to enter the major junior-level Canadian Hockey League component leagues a year early. He was the first player granted such status to play in the Western Hockey League (WHL). In the 2020 WHL bantam draft, Bedard was selected first overall by the Regina Pats. In September 2020, Bedard was loaned to the HV71 junior hockey system in Sweden, where he could play while the WHL season was delayed due to the COVID-19 pandemic. He played with HV71 until the WHL returned to play for its 2020–21 season beginning in March 2021. Due to the pandemic, his rookie season was a shortened one with all of the Pats games played at Regina's Brandt Centre. As a rookie, Bedard scored 12 goals and 16 assists for 28 points in 15 games before leaving for the 2021 World U18 Championships. He was awarded the Jim Piggott Memorial Trophy as the WHL's rookie of the year.

During the 2021–22 WHL season, Bedard became the youngest player to score 50 or more goals in a season, scoring his 50th and 51st goals in the last game of the regular season. He finished the year with 51 goals and 49 assists for 100 points, ranking second in the WHL in goals and fourth in points. He was only the third 16-year-old to manage a 100-point season in the WHL, and the first to do so in the 21st century. Despite Bedard's scoring, the Pats narrowly missed qualifying for the playoffs. As he attended the 2022 NHL entry draft as an observer, Bedard was profiled in The New York Times as "the most exciting future NHL player attending this week's draft."

After not recording a point in his opening game of the 2022–23 season, Bedard embarked on a lengthy points streak that made him the league's top scorer. On November 17, he became the first WHL player in a decade to record twenty-game point streaks in consecutive seasons. Bedard was noted for attracting large crowds for the Pats' road games; his first-ever return to the Greater Vancouver area for a game against the Vancouver Giants drew over 5,000 fans, which was nearly double the Giants' season average. Despite missing eleven games in December and early January while attending the World Junior Championships, Bedard still led the WHL in scoring upon his return to the lineup on January 8, where he had four goals and two assists in a 6–2 home victory over the Calgary Hitmen.

With the Pats not considered a title contender, there was media discussion in advance of the WHL's 2023 trade deadline about whether the Pats should seek to trade him to a contending team in exchange for future assets. Pats general manager John Paddock asserted that he would not trade Bedard, noting in addition that per WHL rules Bedard would have to consent to be traded, and that "Connor has the final say. He wants to be a Regina Pat and finish his career in Regina, clear?" Ultimately, the trade deadline passed without any transaction.

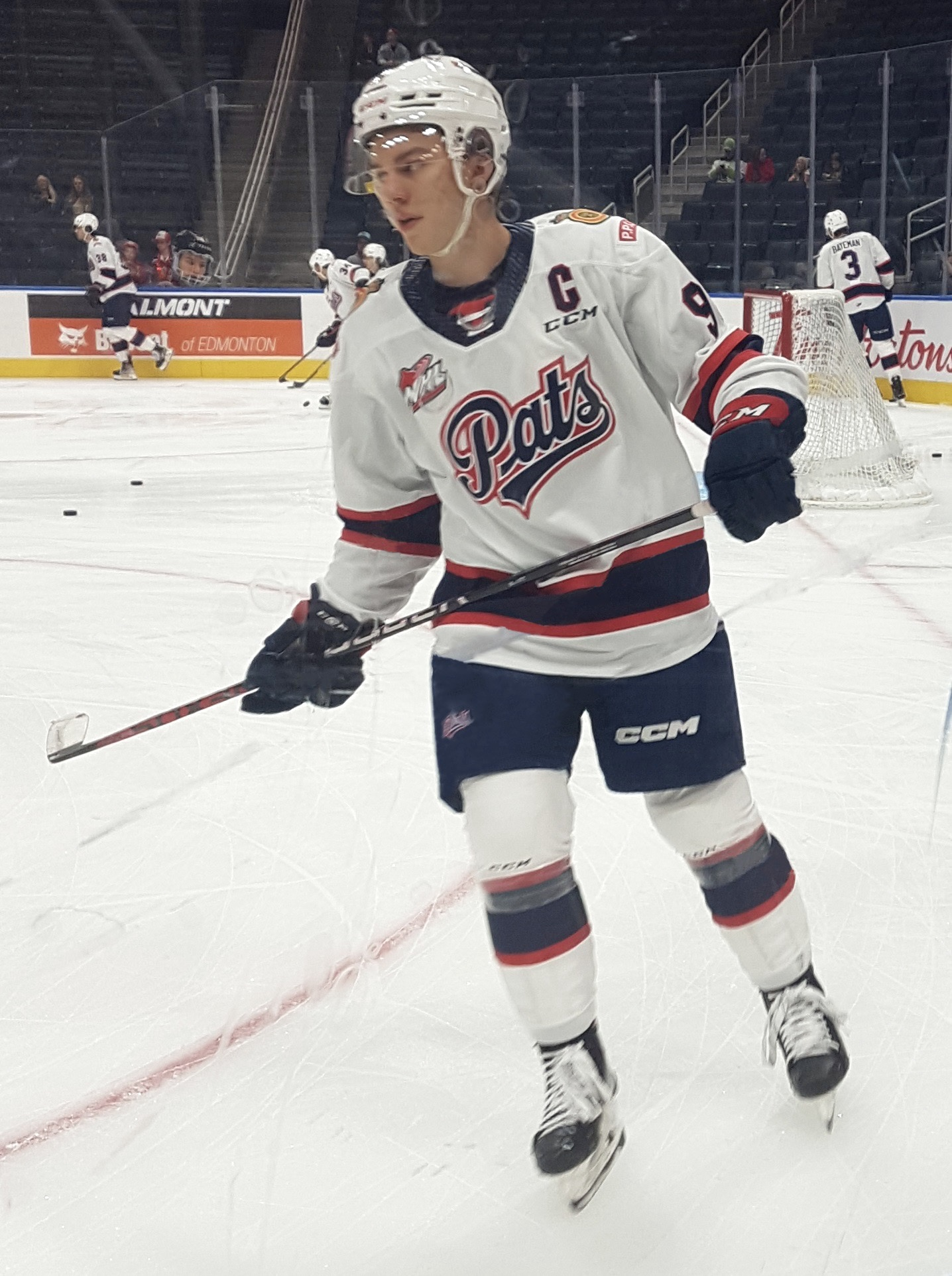
Bedard with the Regina Pats in September 2022.

While Bedard's status as an audience draw was already apparent earlier in the season, this effect ramped up noticeably following his return from the 2023 World Junior Championships, which had significantly elevated his national profile. A January road trip through the province of Alberta saw team record attendance (7,287) at the Red Deer Rebels' Peavey Mart Centrium, while Medicine Hat Tigers' sellout of their arena saw more than double their average attendance. The Lethbridge Hurricanes offered standing-room only at the Enmax Centre. The Pats played a nationally televised game against the Hitmen in the Saddledome, the home of the NHL's Calgary Flames. The Saddledome's upper seating was made available for the occasion, resulting in a near-record WHL attendance of 17,223 when the Hitmen's seasonal average was only 3500.

Bedard finished the regular season with 71 goals and 72 assists in 57 games, winning the Bob Clarke Trophy as the WHL's leading scorer. His 143 points also led the CHL in scoring for the year, and he was the first WHL player to have a 140-point season since 1995–96. The league subsequently awarded Bedard the Four Broncos Memorial Trophy as WHL player of the year. He was the first draft-eligible player to be named league MVP since Sam Reinhart nine years prior. Bedard was later given the CHL's Top Draft Prospect and Player of the Year awards—becoming the first person to win those and the CHL Top Scorer Award in a single season—and named to the revived CHL First All-Star Team.

The Regina Pats qualified for the 2023 WHL playoffs, drawing a first-round match-up against the Saskatoon Blades. Bedard had two goals and an assist in a 6–1 Regina victory in the series opener, the first playoff points of his career. The Pats won the first two games of the series, but lost the next three straight. Bedard had a goal and three assists in Game 6, a 5–3 Regina victory that forced Game 7. The Pats were eliminated by the Blades, losing Game 7 in Saskatoon by a score of 4–1. Bedard had 10 goals and 10 assists in the series, which was expected to mark the end of his WHL and junior career.

=== 2023 NHL entry draft ===
Bedard attracted considerable interest as a future high selection in the NHL entry draft from an early age, speculation that was accelerated by his being granted exceptional status to play in the WHL. Much of the early conversation two years in advance of the 2023 NHL entry draft involved a debate of his merits versus those of Russian winger Matvei Michkov, also considered a budding top talent with the same draft eligibility. Following their dueling appearances on their respective countries' national teams at the 2021 World U18 Championships and the abortive initial edition of the 2022 World Junior Championships, many in the media suggested a career rivalry between them comparable to that between Russian Alexander Ovechkin and Canadian Sidney Crosby, who were selected first overall in 2004 and 2005 respectively. However, following Michkov's signing of a multi-year contract extension with his KHL club SKA Saint Petersburg, as well as geopolitical uncertainties resultant from the Russian invasion of Ukraine, it was widely presumed that Bedard would be picked first in the draft.

Entering his draft year as the consensus choice to be taken first overall, much of the debate around Bedard's future concerned whether he warranted being considered a "generational" talent, comparable to Crosby, Ovechkin and Connor McDavid. A number of NHL teams, notably the Chicago Blackhawks and Arizona Coyotes, were said to be openly tanking the 2022–23 season in the hopes of obtaining favourable odds in the draft lottery. The Sports Network produced a parody song about this, called "Bad for Bedard". ESPN remarked that fans of "potential lottery teams have adopted some variation of 'Fail/Tank/Lose Hard for Bedard' as a 2022–23 battle cry." The first overall selection was ultimately won by the Blackhawks, making them Bedard's presumptive destination. A Chicago Sun-Times reporter stated that within an hour and a half of the lottery outcome being announced, Chicago had already sold $2.5 million of season ticket packages.

In advance of the draft in Nashville, Tennessee, Bedard received the E.J. McGuire Award of Excellence, bestowed by the NHL Central Scouting Bureau to "the candidate who best exemplifies commitment to excellence through strength of character, competitiveness, and athleticism."

=== Chicago Blackhawks (2023–present) ===
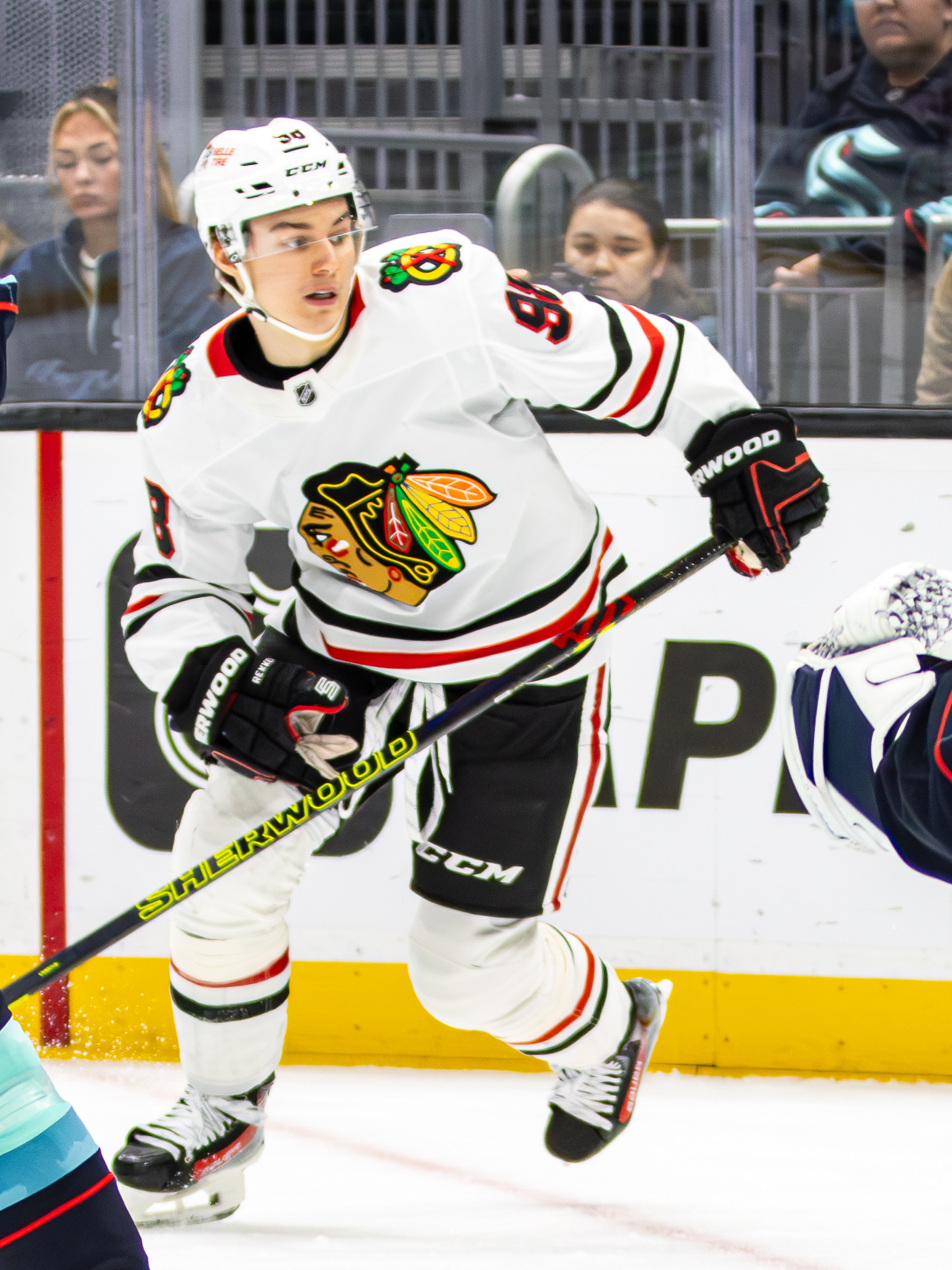
Bedard playing for the Chicago Blackhawks in November 2024

On June 28, 2023, the Chicago Blackhawks selected Bedard first overall in the 2023 NHL entry draft. It was the second Blackhawks' first overall selection in team history, after Patrick Kane in 2007. He was also the second player born in British Columbia selected first overall, after Ryan Nugent-Hopkins in 2011.

Bedard signed a three-year, entry-level contract with the Blackhawks on July 17, his 18th birthday. He made his NHL debut on October 10, where Bedard recorded his first point, an assist, in a 4–2 win over the Pittsburgh Penguins. Bedard scored his first NHL goal in the opening period the next night, on October 11, of a 3–1 loss to the Boston Bruins. His first two NHL games were the most-watched regular season ice hockey games for ESPN and TNT respectively. On November 9, Bedard tallied two goals and two assists in a 5–3 win against the Tampa Bay Lightning, becoming the third-youngest player in NHL history to record a four-point game, the youngest rookie to do so since 1944, as well as becoming the youngest in Blackhawks franchise history to record a multi-goal game. On January 4, 2024, Bedard was selected to represent the Blackhawks at the 2024 National Hockey League All-Star Game. He would have been the youngest All-Star in NHL history; however, the following day, he sustained a broken jaw after a check from New Jersey Devils defenceman Brendan Smith, and was placed on injured reserve for six-to-eight weeks after undergoing surgery. Due to the injury, he was excluded from the All-Star Game rosters, but managed to appear in the "One-Timers" skills competition, serving pucks to Mathew Barzal, Nathan MacKinnon and David Pastrňák. Bedard returned to action on February 15, registering one assist in a 4–1 loss against the Penguins. On March 12, Bedard put up a career-high of five points, with a goal and four assists to lead the Blackhawks to a 7–2 win over the Anaheim Ducks. He finished the season with 22 goals and 61 points in 68 games, leading all NHL rookies, and was the recipient of the Calder Memorial Trophy as rookie of the year, becoming the first Blackhawks player since Artemi Panarin in 2016 to receive the award.

Bedard recorded 23 goals and 44 assists for 67 points in all 82 games during his sophomore 2024–25 season.

On November 7, 2025, Bedard recorded his fourth career four-point game in a 4–0 win over the Calgary Flames, becoming the first player since Steven Stamkos to record four or more four-point games before age 21. Bedard's offensive production continued during the opening month of the 2025–26 NHL season. He sustained a shoulder injury in a 3–2 loss against the St. Louis Blues on December 12, which sidelined him for 12 games. Bedard was sixth in scoring amongst all skaters in NHL at the time of the injury. He was formally appointed as an alternate captain for the team after captain Nick Foligno was traded midway through the season. Bedard tallied career highs with 30 goals and 45 assists in 69 games during the 2025–26 season.

In July 2026, Bedard suffered a shoulder injury during an off-season training session, which required surgery and would sideline him for the first month of the 2026–27 season. On July 17, Bedard signed a five-year, $75 million contract extension with the Blackhawks. On September 15, the Blackhawks named Bedard as the 37th captain in franchise history. On November 17, Bedard injured his right shoulder in a game against the Toronto Maple Leafs. On November 21, the Blackhawks announced Bedard would undergo surgery to repair his shoulder and miss an indefinite amount of time. He registered 18 points (7 goals, 11 assists) in 15 games up to that point in the season.

== International play ==
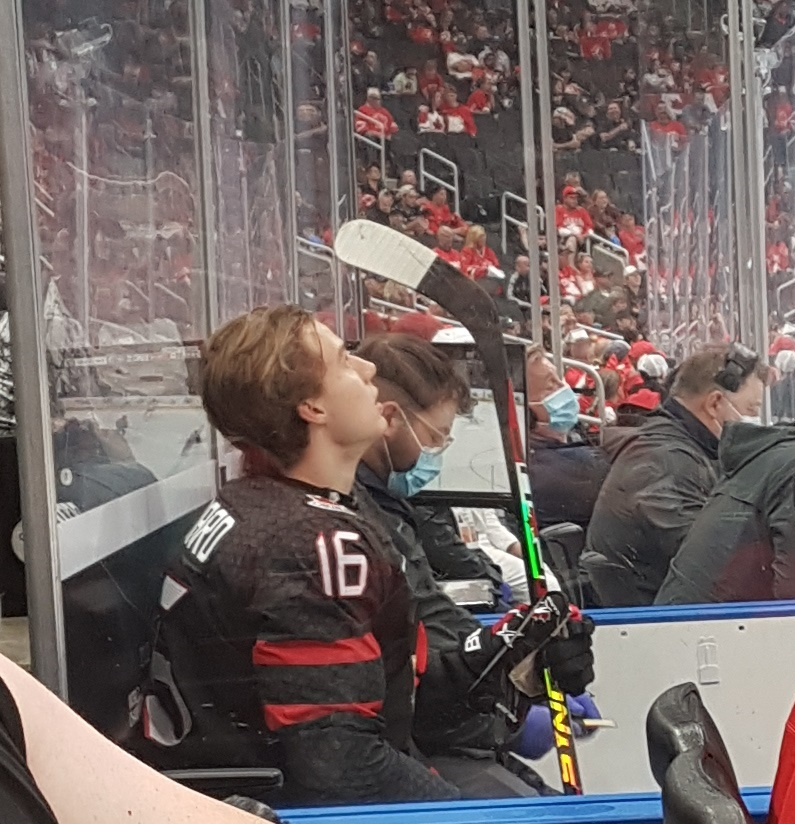
- Bedard serving a penalty at the 2022 World Junior Championships

Medal record

Men's ice hockey

Representing Canada

World Junior Championships
Gold medal – first place	2022 Canada	
Gold medal – first place	2023 Canada	

World U18 Championships
Gold medal – first place	2021 United States	

In April and May 2021, Bedard played for the Canada under-18 team at the 2021 World U18 Championships, winning a gold medal, tying for second in the tournament in points, and earning a spot on the media all-star team.

On December 12, 2021, Bedard became the seventh 16-year-old to be selected by Canada for the 2022 World Junior Championships. Initially the thirteenth forward in the lineup, by the end of the team's first game he had been elevated to the top six. Bedard scored four goals in an 11–2 victory over Austria, breaking Wayne Gretzky's record for most goals by a 16-year-old at the championships, and tying the overall Canadian record for most goals in a single World Junior game. However, the tournament was cancelled on December 29 due to concerns about COVID-19; it was subsequently announced that the event would be rebooted in August 2022.

On April 18, 2022, Bedard was named to the Canadian team for the 2022 World U18 Championships, the only returning player from the previous year's championship team. He scored a hat trick in the second game of the tournament, an 8–3 victory over Germany, breaking Shane Wright's record for Canada goal-scoring at the U18 Championships, and simultaneously breaking Mathew Barzal's Canada points record. Later in the summer, at the revived World Junior Championships, Bedard again played for Canada, attracting considerable attention for his shot. He recorded four goals and four assists over the course of the seven-game tournament, winning gold with Canada.

On December 12, 2022, Bedard was named to the Canadian national team to compete at the 2023 World Junior Championships. When he scored the opening goal in the quarter-final match against Slovakia, Bedard broke the Canadian record for career goals and points at the tournament. He also set a new world record for World Junior points by a player under the age of 19, previously held by Jaromír Jágr. Bedard's game-winning goal, scored in overtime, was called an "indelible stamp" on the tournament. He recorded nine goals and fourteen assists during the seven-game tournament, winning gold with Canada for the second consecutive year. Bedard was named the championships' best forward and most valuable player by the IIHF directorate, as well as to the media all-star team. Bedard was the inaugural recipient of the IIHF Male Player of the Year award.

Following the end of the 2023–24 NHL season, with the Blackhawks not qualifying for the 2024 Stanley Cup playoffs, Bedard accepted an invitation to make his debut with the senior national team at the 2024 World Championship. Bedard would score his first senior international goal on May 11, 2024, against Great Britain, helping Canada to a 4–2 victory. He began the tournament with a strong offensive showing, recording five goals and one assist in Canada's first three games. However, his production subsequently tapered off, with no points registered in the following four contests. Bedard's offensive drought led to diminished ice-time before he was relegated to Canada's 13th forward. He appeared in the Canada's final game against Sweden, where he was held without a point in a 4–2 loss to Sweden. Bedard finished the tournament with eight points in ten games.

== Career statistics ==
=== Regular season and playoffs ===
Bold indicates led league

			Regular season					Playoffs
Season	Team	League	GP	G	A	Pts	PIM	GP	G	A	Pts	PIM
2018–19	West Van Academy Prep	CSSHL U15	30	64	24	88	22	4	5	2	7	2
2019–20	West Van Academy Prep	CSSHL U18	36	43	41	84	32	1	1	1	2	0
2020–21	HV71 J18	J18 Region	1	1	1	2	0	―	―	―	―	―
2020–21	HV71 J20	J20 National	4	2	2	4	0	―	―	―	―	―
2020–21	Regina Pats	WHL	15	12	16	28	6	―	―	―	―	―
2021–22	Regina Pats	WHL	62	51	49	100	42	―	―	―	―	―
2022–23	Regina Pats	WHL	57	**71**	**72**	**143**	62	7	10	10	20	8
2023–24	Chicago Blackhawks	NHL	68	22	39	61	28	―	―	―	―	―
2024–25	Chicago Blackhawks	NHL	82	23	44	67	70	―	―	―	―	―
2025–26	Chicago Blackhawks	NHL	69	30	45	75	50	―	―	―	―	―
NHL totals			219	75	128	203	148	―	―	―	―	―

=== International ===
Bold indicates led tournament

Year	Team	Event	Result	GP	G	A	Pts	PIM
2021	Canada	U18	1st place, gold medalist(s)	7	7	7	14	2
2022	Canada	U18	5th	4	6	1	7	4
2022 (Note: The initial 2022 World Junior Championships was cancelled due to the COVID-19 pandemic; however the scoring from that tournament was still counted.)	Canada	WJC	—	2	4	1	5	0
2022	Canada	WJC	1st place, gold medalist(s)	7	4	4	8	2
2023	Canada	WJC	1st place, gold medalist(s)	7	**9**	**14**	**23**	2
2024	Canada	WC	4th	10	5	3	8	10
Junior totals				27	30	27	57	10
Senior totals				10	5	3	8	10

== Awards and honours ==
Award	Year	Ref
CSSHL
CSSHL U15 Most Valuable Player	2019	
CSSHL U18 Most Valuable Player	2020	
WHL
WHL Exceptional Player Status	2020	
Jim Piggott Memorial Trophy	2021	
Bob Clarke Trophy	2023	
Four Broncos Memorial Trophy	2023	
CHL
CHL Top Scorer Award	2023	
CHL Top Draft Prospect Award	2023	
David Branch Player of the Year Award	2023	
First All-Star Team	2023	
NHL
E.J. McGuire Award of Excellence	2023	
NHL All-Star Game	2024	
Calder Memorial Trophy	2024	
NHL All-Rookie Team	2024	
International
World U18 Championship Media All-Star Team	2021	
WJC Best Forward	2023	
WJC Media All-Star Team	2023	
WJC MVP	2023	
IIHF Male Player of the Year	2023	

== Notes ==
Awards and achievements
Preceded by Juraj Slafkovský	NHL first-overall draft pick 2023	Succeeded by Macklin Celebrini
Preceded by Sam Rinzel	Chicago Blackhawks first-round draft pick 2023	Succeeded by Oliver Moore
Preceded by Matty Beniers	Winner of the Calder Memorial Trophy; 2024	Succeeded by Lane Hutson
Sporting positions
Preceded by Nick Foligno	Chicago Blackhawks captain 2026–present	Incumbent
