= 2026–27 NHL season =

National Hockey League season

- League: National Hockey League
- Sport: Ice hockey
- Duration: September 29, 2026 – June 2027
- Games: 84
- Teams: 32
- TV partner(s): Sportsnet/SN1/SN360, TVA Sports (Canada); ESPN/ABC/ESPN2, TNT/TBS/truTV (United States)
- Streaming partner(s): Sportsnet+, Amazon Prime Video (Canada); ESPN app/Hulu/Disney+, HBO Max (United States)

Draft
- Top draft pick: Gavin McKenna
- Picked by: Toronto Maple Leafs

Regular season

Playoffs

Stanley Cup

NHL seasons
- 2025–26 2027–28

The 2026–27 NHL season is the 110th season of operation (109th season of play) of the National Hockey League (NHL). The season features an 84-game regular season schedule for the first time since 1993–94. The regular season began on September 29, 2026. The Stanley Cup playoffs are then planned to begin in April 2027, ending with the Stanley Cup Final in June.

== League business ==
=== Collective bargaining agreement ===
On June 27, 2025, the league and the NHL Players' Association agreed on a new four-year collective bargaining agreement (CBA) that will take effect from the 2026–27 to 2029–30 seasons. Among the changes under the agreement, the 2026–27 regular season expands from 82 to 84 games, featuring two more divisional games; the additional regular season games will come with a reduction in the number of preseason games played, down from 6 to 4.

Additionally, as part of the new CBA, the 2026–27 season will see the end of the use of amateur emergency back-up goaltenders (EBUGs) supplied by the home team for each game; instead, teams must hire their own emergency goaltender who will travel with the team and is permitted to have other non-player team duties. To prevent the hiring of "ringers", each team's new EBUG must fulfill the following conditions: they must not have played professional hockey at any level in the previous three seasons, cannot have ever played a single game in the NHL under a standard player contract, cannot have played more than 80 professional games in their careers, and are not on the reserve list or restricted free agent list of any NHL teams. If a team maintains three or more goaltenders on their active roster, the team is still required to hire a permanent EBUG but is not required to have their EBUG present for a game. EBUGs will be required to wear 00 as their uniform number. Under the prior EBUG rules, the home maintained list a list of local EBUGs, but their names were not generally public knowledge; the identities of the new permanent EBUGs were required to be submitted to the league and announced, allowing for a list of EBUGs to be compiled.

=== Winnipeg Jets franchise consolidation ===
On September 24, 2026, the NHL announced that the franchise records and statistics of the original Winnipeg Jets from 1972 to 1996 would be moved from the inactive Arizona Coyotes franchise to the current Winnipeg Jets franchise. As a result, the Jets' franchise records include both its original and current incarnations as well as the Atlanta Thrashers.

=== Entry draft ===
The 2026 NHL entry draft took place on June 26–27 at KeyBank Center in Buffalo, New York.

== Coaching changes ==
Coaching changes
Off–season
Team	2025–26 coach	2026–27 coach	Notes
Edmonton Oilers	Kris Knoblauch	Mike Babcock	Knoblauch was fired on May 14, 2026, two weeks after the Oilers' elimination from the 2026 Stanley Cup playoffs. In parts of three seasons with the team, Knoblauch totaled a 135–77–21 record, with two consecutive Stanley Cup Final appearances in 2024 and 2025. Babcock, most recently head coach of the Columbus Blue Jackets during part of the 2023 offseason, was cleared by the NHLPA and NHL in an investigation on June 18, and was named head coach on June 23.
Los Angeles Kings	Jim Hiller; D. J. Smith*	Peter Laviolette	Hiller was fired on March 1, 2026, after the Kings started the season 24–21–14, including a 2–5–1 record in his final eight games. In parts of three seasons with Los Angeles, Hiller posted a 93–58–24 record, reaching the playoffs in both of his completed seasons, but losing to the Edmonton Oilers in the first round both times. Smith, most recently an assistant coach for Los Angeles, and formerly head coach of the Ottawa Senators from 2019 to 2023, was named interim head coach the same day. Smith finished out the season 11–6–6, with Los Angeles being swept in the first round of the playoffs. Laviolette, most recently head coach of the New York Rangers from 2023 to 2025, was named head coach on June 9.
Toronto Maple Leafs	Craig Berube	Jim Hiller	Berube was fired on May 13, 2026, approximately a month after the end of the Maple Leafs' season. In two seasons with Toronto, Berube posted a 84–62–18 record, reaching the second round of the 2025 Stanley Cup playoffs in his first year, but missing the playoffs in his second. Hiller, most recently head coach of the Los Angeles Kings from 2024 to 2026, was named head coach on June 17.
Vancouver Canucks	Adam Foote	Manny Malhotra	Foote was fired on May 19, 2026, approximately a month after the end of the Canucks' season. In his only season with Vancouver, Foote recorded a 25–49–8 record, finishing last in the NHL. Malhotra, the head coach of the Canucks' American Hockey League (AHL) affiliate, the Abbotsford Canucks, and who played for the NHL Canucks from 2010 to 2013, was named head coach on June 1.
Vegas Golden Knights	Bruce Cassidy; John Tortorella	Ryan Craig	Cassidy was fired on March 29, 2026, with eight games remaining in the season, after the Golden Knights started the season 32–26–16, including a 3–5–2 record in his final ten games. In just under four seasons with Vegas, Cassidy recorded a 178–99–43 record, with three playoff appearances, leading the franchise to its first Stanley Cup championship in 2023. Tortorella, most recently head coach of the Philadelphia Flyers from 2022 to 2025, was named head coach the same day, signing a contract for the remainder of the season and playoffs. Tortorella finished out the season 7–0–1, with Vegas reaching the 2026 Stanley Cup Final, but losing to the Carolina Hurricanes. On June 16, the Golden Knights announced that Tortorella would not return as head coach for the 2026–27 season. Craig, the head coach of the Golden Knights' AHL affiliate, the Henderson Silver Knights, and previously an assistant coach with Vegas from 2017 to 2023, was named head coach on June 17.

(*) Indicates interim

== Front office changes ==
General Managers
Off–season
Team	2025–26 general manager	2026–27 general manager	Notes
Colorado Avalanche	Chris MacFarland	Joe Sakic	On June 2, 2026, MacFarland departed the Avalanche to become president of hockey operations and general manager of the Nashville Predators. Sakic, the Avalanche's president of hockey operations, and previously general manager from 2014 to 2022, re-assumed the role of general manager the same day.
Detroit Red Wings	Steve Yzerman	Shawn Horcoff*	On July 15, 2026, the Red Wings announced that Yzerman would step down as general manager, instead becoming a senior advisor to owner Christopher Ilitch; however, he remained in the role until a successor was found. Horcoff, the assistant general manager and general manager of the Red Wings' American Hockey League (AHL) affiliate Grand Rapids Griffins, was named interim general manager on September 15.
Nashville Predators	Barry Trotz	Chris MacFarland	On February 2, 2026, Trotz announced his intention to retire as the Predators' general manager, instead serving as an advisor through the end of his contract; however, he stayed in the role until a successor was found. MacFarland, most recently the general manager of the Colorado Avalanche, was named president of hockey operations and general manager on June 2.
New Jersey Devils	Tom Fitzgerald	Sunny Mehta	Fitzgerald was fired on April 6, 2026, after the Devils began the season 40–34–3. Fitzgerald had served as the Devils' general manager since 2020, as well as president of hockey operations since 2024, overseeing two playoff berths in six completed seasons. Mehta, most recently assistant general manager of the Florida Panthers, and formerly an executive with the Devils from 2014 to 2017, was named general manager on April 16.
St. Louis Blues	Doug Armstrong	Alexander Steen	Armstrong was signed to a three-year contract extension on June 13, 2024, as the president of hockey operations for the Blues. Steen was also named as special assistant to the general manager at the same time through the 2025–26 season, with the intention to become the general manager of the Blues beginning with the 2026–27 season. On April 24, 2026, the Blues formally confirmed that Steen would succeed Armstrong as general manager on July 1, with Armstrong remaining as president of hockey operations; however, the Blues later announced on June 30 that Steen had officially begun his general manager duties that day.
Toronto Maple Leafs	Brad Treliving; Ryan Hardy*; Brandon Pridham*	John Chayka	Treliving was fired on March 30, 2026, after the Maple Leafs began the season 31–30–13. Treliving had served as the Maple Leafs' general manager since 2023, overseeing playoff berths in his two completed seasons. The following day, Toronto announced that assistant general managers Hardy and Pridham would serve as co-interim general managers for the remainder of the 2025–26 season. Chayka, most recently general manager of the Arizona Coyotes from 2016 to 2020, was named general manager on May 3.
Vancouver Canucks	Patrik Allvin	Ryan Johnson	On April 17, 2026, the day after the conclusion of the Canucks' season, Allvin was fired by the Canucks. Allvin had served as general manager since 2022, overseeing one playoff appearance. Johnson, the assistant general manager, and general manager of the Canucks' AHL affiliate Abbotsford Canucks, was promoted to general manager on May 14.

(*) Indicates interim.

== Arena changes ==
- This is planned to be the last season the Calgary Flames will play their home games at Scotiabank Saddledome before moving to Scotia Place.

== Regular season ==
The regular season began on September 29, 2026, and will end on April 10, 2027.

=== International games ===
The Seattle Kraken and Carolina Hurricanes played two games against each other on November 12 and 14, 2026 at Veikkaus Arena in Helsinki, Finland. The Chicago Blackhawks and Ottawa Senators are scheduled to play two games against each other on December 18 and 20, 2026 at PSD Bank Dome in Düsseldorf, Germany.

=== Outdoor games ===
The league has scheduled three outdoor games this season:

- The 2026 Heritage Classic was held on October 25, 2026, at Princess Auto Stadium in Winnipeg, with the Winnipeg Jets hosting the Montreal Canadiens.
- The 2027 Winter Classic is scheduled for December 31, 2026, at Rice–Eccles Stadium in Salt Lake City, with the Utah Mammoth hosting the Colorado Avalanche.
- The 2027 Stadium Series is scheduled for February 20, 2027, at AT&T Stadium in Arlington, Texas, with the Dallas Stars hosting the Vegas Golden Knights.

=== All-Star Game ===
The 2027 All-Star Game is scheduled for February 7, 2027, at UBS Arena at Elmont, New York, the home of the New York Islanders. The All-Star Game would be played for the first time since 2024. The league instead held the 4 Nations Face-Off in 2025, then the players participated in the 2026 Winter Olympics. The league originally planned a 2026 All-Star Game at UBS Arena as a "send-off" to the Olympics, but decided against it.

== Standings ==
=== Eastern Conference ===
Top 3 (Metropolitan Division)
Pos	Team	GP	W	L	OTL	RW	GF	GA	GD	Pts
1	Carolina Hurricanes	23	17	3	3	16	95	53	+42	37
2	New Jersey Devils	23	15	8	0	10	88	73	+15	30
3	New York Rangers	22	13	8	1	13	67	58	+9	27

Updated to game(s) played on November 21, 2026. Source: National Hockey League
Rules for classification: 1) Fewer number of games played (GP, only during regular season); 2) Greater number of regulation wins (RW); 3) Greater number of wins in regulation and overtime, excluding shootout wins (ROW); 4) Greater number of total wins, including shootouts (W); 5) Greater number of points earned in head-to-head play; if teams played an uneven number of head-to-head games, the result of the first game on the home ice of the team with the extra home game is discarded; 6) Greater goal differential (GD); 7) Greater number of goals scored (GF)

Top 3 (Atlantic Division)
Pos	Team	GP	W	L	OTL	RW	GF	GA	GD	Pts
1	Ottawa Senators	24	15	6	3	12	79	70	+9	33
2	Tampa Bay Lightning	22	15	5	2	13	82	62	+20	32
3	Montreal Canadiens	24	14	6	4	9	77	71	+6	32

Updated to game(s) played on November 21, 2026. Source: National Hockey League
Rules for classification: 1) Fewer number of games played (GP, only during regular season); 2) Greater number of regulation wins (RW); 3) Greater number of wins in regulation and overtime, excluding shootout wins (ROW); 4) Greater number of total wins, including shootouts (W); 5) Greater number of points earned in head-to-head play; if teams played an uneven number of head-to-head games, the result of the first game on the home ice of the team with the extra home game is discarded; 6) Greater goal differential (GD); 7) Greater number of goals scored (GF)

Eastern Conference Wild Card
Pos	Div	Team	GP	W	L	OTL	RW	GF	GA	GD	Pts
1	AT	Boston Bruins	23	15	7	1	12	83	61	+22	31
2	AT	Florida Panthers	24	13	8	3	11	76	71	+5	29
3	ME	New York Islanders	22	11	6	5	9	71	63	+8	27
4	ME	Philadelphia Flyers	26	9	11	6	8	67	88	−21	24
5	AT	Buffalo Sabres	23	9	10	4	7	67	81	−14	22
6	ME	Washington Capitals	21	10	11	0	8	72	83	−11	20
7	AT	Detroit Red Wings	23	8	12	3	6	60	71	−11	19
8	AT	Toronto Maple Leafs	25	8	14	3	7	78	90	−12	19
9	ME	Columbus Blue Jackets	21	9	12	0	4	54	68	−14	18
10	ME	Pittsburgh Penguins	22	7	13	2	3	67	80	−13	16

Updated to game(s) played on November 21, 2026. Source: National Hockey League
Rules for classification: 1) Fewer number of games played (GP, only during regular season); 2) Greater number of regulation wins (RW); 3) Greater number of wins in regulation and overtime, excluding shootout wins (ROW); 4) Greater number of total wins, including shootouts (W); 5) Greater number of points earned in head-to-head play; if teams played an uneven number of head-to-head games, the result of the first game on the home ice of the team with the extra home game is discarded; 6) Greater goal differential (GD); 7) Greater number of goals scored (GF)

=== Western Conference ===
Top 3 (Central Division)
Pos	Team	GP	W	L	OTL	RW	GF	GA	GD	Pts
1	Minnesota Wild	25	17	3	5	16	90	56	+34	39
2	Dallas Stars	22	14	6	2	8	64	56	+8	30
3	Colorado Avalanche	23	13	7	3	13	90	68	+22	29

Updated to game(s) played on November 21, 2026. Source: National Hockey League
Rules for classification: 1) Fewer number of games played (GP, only during regular season); 2) Greater number of regulation wins (RW); 3) Greater number of wins in regulation and overtime, excluding shootout wins (ROW); 4) Greater number of total wins, including shootouts (W); 5) Greater number of points earned in head-to-head play; if teams played an uneven number of head-to-head games, the result of the first game on the home ice of the team with the extra home game is discarded; 6) Greater goal differential (GD); 7) Greater number of goals scored (GF)

Top 3 (Pacific Division)
Pos	Team	GP	W	L	OTL	RW	GF	GA	GD	Pts
1	Edmonton Oilers	25	17	5	3	14	97	72	+25	37
2	Vegas Golden Knights	25	14	6	5	11	85	75	+10	33
3	San Jose Sharks	25	11	12	2	4	69	89	−20	24

Updated to game(s) played on November 21, 2026. Source: National Hockey League
Rules for classification: 1) Fewer number of games played (GP, only during regular season); 2) Greater number of regulation wins (RW); 3) Greater number of wins in regulation and overtime, excluding shootout wins (ROW); 4) Greater number of total wins, including shootouts (W); 5) Greater number of points earned in head-to-head play; if teams played an uneven number of head-to-head games, the result of the first game on the home ice of the team with the extra home game is discarded; 6) Greater goal differential (GD); 7) Greater number of goals scored (GF)

Western Conference Wild Card
Pos	Div	Team	GP	W	L	OTL	RW	GF	GA	GD	Pts
1	CE	Nashville Predators	23	12	6	5	9	71	69	+2	29
2	CE	Utah Mammoth	24	12	9	3	10	80	81	−1	27
3	CE	St. Louis Blues	23	12	9	2	11	77	73	+4	26
4	CE	Winnipeg Jets	24	11	9	4	8	75	82	−7	26
5	PA	Anaheim Ducks	24	11	12	1	10	87	92	−5	23
6	PA	Calgary Flames	24	10	12	2	9	60	84	−24	22
7	PA	Seattle Kraken	20	10	9	1	7	67	71	−4	21
8	PA	Los Angeles Kings	21	7	12	2	4	58	70	−12	16
9	CE	Chicago Blackhawks	23	7	14	2	4	58	93	−35	16
10	PA	Vancouver Canucks	25	6	18	1	3	71	108	−37	13

Updated to game(s) played on November 21, 2026. Source: National Hockey League
Rules for classification: 1) Fewer number of games played (GP, only during regular season); 2) Greater number of regulation wins (RW); 3) Greater number of wins in regulation and overtime, excluding shootout wins (ROW); 4) Greater number of total wins, including shootouts (W); 5) Greater number of points earned in head-to-head play; if teams played an uneven number of head-to-head games, the result of the first game on the home ice of the team with the extra home game is discarded; 6) Greater goal differential (GD); 7) Greater number of goals scored (GF)

== Statistics ==
=== Scoring leaders ===
The following players led the league in regular season points at the completion of games played on November 21, 2026.

Player	Team	GP	G	A	Pts	+/–	PIM
Connor McDavid	Edmonton Oilers	25	13	44	57	+26	8
Leon Draisaitl	Edmonton Oilers	25	22	24	46	+23	8
Kirill Kaprizov	Minnesota Wild	25	18	27	45	+25	4
Evan Bouchard	Edmonton Oilers	25	12	26	38	+28	8
Quinn Hughes	Minnesota Wild	24	8	26	34	+15	8
Auston Matthews	Toronto Maple Leafs	25	14	19	33	+9	8
Sebastian Aho	Carolina Hurricanes	23	13	19	32	+12	16
Matthew Tkachuk	Florida Panthers	23	7	25	32	+2	34
Tim Stützle	Ottawa Senators	24	13	18	31	+12	10
David Pastrnak	Boston Bruins	23	11	20	31	+6	8

=== Leading goaltenders ===
The following goaltenders led the league in regular season goals against average at the completion of games played on November 21, 2026, while playing at least 780 minutes.

Player	Team	GP	TOI	W	L	OTL	GA	SO	SA	SV%	GAA
Pyotr Kochetkov	Carolina Hurricanes	15	899:44	13	1	1	27	2	302	.911	1.80
Jesper Wallstedt	Minnesota Wild	22	1,329:15	16	2	4	44	0	575	.923	1.99
Jake Oettinger	Dallas Stars	17	1,011:06	12	4	1	38	4	383	.901	2.25
Joel Hofer	St. Louis Blues	16	956:37	9	6	1	36	2	465	.923	2.26
Jacob Fowler	Montreal Canadiens	15	907:28	10	3	2	35	2	425	.918	2.31
Dylan Garand	New York Rangers	15	808:59	7	7	1	32	1	356	.910	2.37
Ilya Sorokin	New York Islanders	15	903:20	9	4	2	36	1	439	.918	2.39
Juuse Saros	Nashville Predators	17	1,009:27	8	4	4	42	1	501	.916	2.50
Mackenzie Blackwood	Colorado Avalanche	17	986:00	11	4	1	42	1	438	.904	2.56
Andrei Vasilevskiy	Tampa Bay Lightning	17	1,018:02	11	5	1	44	0	418	.895	2.59

== Uniforms ==
=== Wholesale team changes ===
- The Calgary Flames re-introduced their home jerseys worn from 2003 to 2007 as alternate uniforms, paying tribute to the team's 2004 Stanley Cup Final run, replacing the black alternates worn from 2022 to 2026. It will be worn four times during the season against each team the Flames played against in that Stanley Cup Final run.
- The New York Rangers re-introduced their navy blue third jerseys worn from 2023 to 2025, inspired by New York City, and featuring their shield logo as the crest. It will be worn four times during the season.

=== "Hometown Remix" jerseys ===
On August 19, 2026, the league announced the "Hometown Remix" program, consisting of jerseys for all 32 teams meant to invoke the "fans, city, and local culture" of the franchises.

Metropolitan Division

- Carolina Hurricanes: A storm gray jersey featuring a full body version of the mascot Stormy as the crest. Red striping with silver trim and embossed oak leaf details honors Raleigh's nickname, the "City of Oaks," while the city's skyline appears along the hem.
- Columbus Blue Jackets: A gray version of their 2025 Stadium Series jersey featuring the cannon logo across the front. Navy shoulder panels include an embossed star and filigree detailing, while arched sleeve striping honors Columbus's nickname, "Arch City."
- New Jersey Devils: A black version of their 2024 Stadium Series jersey, but featuring an enlarged version of the current logo without its surrounding roundel. The sleeve striping is sharper and more angular than the team's standard design, with New Jersey state outlines incorporated into the hem.
- New York Islanders: A white jersey featuring the 1990s "Fisherman" logo in a simplified form. Navy shoulder panels, teal and orange striping, wave patterns, lighthouse shoulder patches, and fishhook style lettering reference Long Island's maritime culture.
- New York Rangers: A navy jersey featuring the diagonal "NEW YORK" wordmark they wore from 1978 to 1987, and the 1990s logo depicting the head of the Statue of Liberty. Silver detailing and red sleeve accents evoke the city's architecture and the statue's torch.
- Philadelphia Flyers: A dark gray Liberty Bell inspired jersey featuring the Flyers' crest in cream and orange. Six orange stripes around the sleeves and waist represent the team's sixty years of existence, while Liberty Bell inscriptions and cracked number motifs are featured.
- Pittsburgh Penguins: A navy jersey using an Andy Warhol style pop art treatment of the current logo. Light blue and gold screen-print effects are paired with shoulder patches honoring The Igloo and the Golden Triangle.
- Washington Capitals: A steel blue jersey combining the 1990s "screaming eagle" logo with the Capitol and hockey sticks logo. White marble patterned shoulder and waist panels, bronze accents, and cherry blossom motifs evoke Washington's monuments and civic identity.

Atlantic Division

- Boston Bruins: A brown varsity style jersey inspired by the team's inaugural uniforms and Boston's college culture. Gold and white striping, a lace up collar, letterman style shoulder patches, and a red brick pattern referencing the Freedom Trail complete the design.
- Buffalo Sabres: A royal-blue jersey featuring the 1990s "goathead" logo recolored in the team's current blue and gold. Lightning bolts and stars appear in the striping to honor Buffalo's nickname, the "City of Light," while the shoulder patches combine the old B logo with an electrified sabre.
- Detroit Red Wings: A traditional red and white jersey featuring the current winged wheel logo with the "Hockeytown" wordmark above it. Copper collar details and an interior octopus pattern reference Detroit's playoff traditions.
- Florida Panthers: A sunrise coral jersey inspired by 1990s South Florida designs. The palm tree and hockey stick logo appears before a tropical sunset, with navy sleeves, gold striping, and a snarling panther shoulder patch.
- Montreal Canadiens: A white jersey featuring a reworked version of the logo with architectural detailing inspired by Old Montreal. A red gradient references Mount Royal, while the five ancestral emblems from the flag of Montreal appear on the sleeves.
- Ottawa Senators: A black and gold jersey featuring the current logo in metallic gold. Tonal patterns inspired by Ottawa's Gothic architecture, bilingual shoulder patches, river bridge imagery, and arched lettering honor the city's identity as Canada's capital.
- Tampa Bay Lightning: A black jersey featuring the skull logo inside a roundel. Sky blue lightning bolt striping and a hem detail inspired by the Bayshore Boulevard balustrade reference the waterfront.
- Toronto Maple Leafs: A warm cream jersey featuring a vintage Maple Leafs logo with vein motifs across the crest, striping, and numbers. The design commemorates the centennial of the Maple Leafs name and includes additional references to the team's early visual identity.

Central Division

- Chicago Blackhawks: A vivid green jersey featuring the current Blackhawks logo rendered in a chain stitch style. Black and cream striping, the tomahawk C shoulder patches, Chicago flag stars, and the inscription "I Will the Spirit of Chicago" are featured on the jersey.
- Colorado Avalanche: A white jersey featuring a large C crest based on the Colorado state flag. Graduated blue mountain patterns appear inside the crest and numbers, with additional Rocky Mountain imagery on the shoulders and hem.
- Dallas Stars: A white jersey featuring a black and neon green version of the current logo inspired by the illuminated Dallas skyline. Geometric striping references the glowing sphere atop Reunion Tower, while neon style lettering reinforces the nighttime theme.
- Minnesota Wild: A black jersey that closely resembles the 1991–93 North Stars dark jersey in its final years featuring a nighttime version of the current Wild logo, with a crescent moon replacing the sun. Ursa Major and Ursa Minor appear on the sleeves, while two stars on the numbers honor the Twin Cities.
- Nashville Predators: A deep navy jersey styled after country music stagewear and the tailoring of Music Row. Gold filigree, tonal pinstripes, letterpressed numbers, and Tennessee iris details surround the logo.
- St. Louis Blues: Their alternate jersey from 2008 to 2016 featuring a circular Blues crest incorporating the Gateway Arch, but now in black and features river waves. Metallic silver accents and debossed wave patterns evoke the Mississippi River and the city's industrial architecture.
- Utah Mammoth: A Mountain Blue jersey featuring the U tusk logo on the front. Black shoulder panels and white and black striping form a tusk shaped silhouette, with additional snow textured details and Wasatch Range imagery featured on the jersey.
- Winnipeg Jets: A dark navy jersey inspired by the northern lights. Blue and green aurora gradients appear across the logo, sleeves, numbers, and socks, while a Manitoba landscape is featured inside the hem.

Pacific Division

- Anaheim Ducks: A Kelly green jersey with purple sleeves and purple and gold striping, reviving the colors associated with the team's namesake film, The Mighty Ducks. The current logo is recolored to match, while the striping and hem include references to the coast and parks of Orange County.
- Calgary Flames: A red and gold jersey commemorating the final season of the Saddledome. Circular sleeve details, roofline inspired striping, and textured gold elements reference the arena, with the years 1983 and 2027 marking its opening and scheduled closure; the 1988 Winter Olympics are also incorporated into the design.
- Edmonton Oilers: A black and orange jersey honoring Edmonton's oil industry. A tonal version of the logo, oil splatter textures, "Oil Country" imagery, and the 1990s rig worker logo appear throughout the uniform.
- Los Angeles Kings: A purple, black, and gold jersey combining the Gretzky era chevron crest with the team's original Forum Blue and gold palette. Hollywood style lettering, palm tree detailing, and six diamonds represent the team's sixty years of existence.
- San Jose Sharks: A bright teal jersey featuring shark mouth motifs around the team's secondary logo. Black lower sleeves use rows of shark teeth with pink accents, while a "Shark Tank" detail appears inside the hem.
- Seattle Kraken: A black nautical jersey inspired by scrimshaw, the engraved bone art associated with sailors and whalers. The team's Space Needle anchor logo appears in weathered bone white, with nautical style lettering, Mount Rainier imagery, and Washington state flower details.
- Vancouver Canucks: A nighttime style navy jersey featuring a dark version of the current logo. Blue sleeve striping contains a debossed Vancouver skyline, while the hem references the Lions Gate Bridge and the shoulder patches use the hockey stick in the rink logo.
- Vegas Golden Knights: A black jersey featuring the current in metallic gold and jade. Casino felt textures, card suits, roulette striping, playing card numbers, and a Vegas wordmark reference the city's ties to gambling and entertainment.

=== Outdoor game uniforms ===
- The Montreal Canadiens and Winnipeg Jets introduced uniforms for the 2026 Heritage Classic. The Canadiens' uniforms resembled their red home jerseys, but with a vintage-styled crest and other added details, while the Jets' uniforms largely recreated those used in the 2016 Heritage Classic, evoking their World Hockey Association-era uniforms and utilizing the franchise's 1970s-1980s logo as its crest.
- The Colorado Avalanche and Utah Mammoth introduced uniforms for the 2027 Winter Classic. Both uniforms are inspired by the ski culture and mountain communities in Utah and Colorado. The Avalanche's uniforms feature a vintage-styled "C" crest with mountains inside, while the Mammoth's uniforms contain a wooly mammoth crest and a "UTAH" wordmark above.

== Milestones ==
=== First games ===
The following is a list of notable players who played their first NHL game during the 2026–27 season, listed with their first team.

Player	Team	Notability
Gavin McKenna	Toronto Maple Leafs	First overall pick in the 2026 draft

=== Major milestones reached ===
- On September 30, 2026, Pittsburgh Penguins forward Sidney Crosby began his 20th season as the team's captain, becoming the longest-tenured captain in NHL history, and surpassing the record previously set by Steve Yzerman of the Detroit Red Wings.
- On October 1, 2026, New York Rangers goaltender Igor Shesterkin became the 18th goaltender in NHL history to score a goal in an NHL game.
- On October 9, 2026, Columbus Blue Jackets goaltender Cam Talbot debuted for the team, becoming the first goaltender in NHL history to play for nine different franchises.
- On October 10, 2026, New Jersey Devils goaltender Jake Allen played his 500th game, becoming the 86th goaltender to reach the mark.
- On October 23, 2026, Chicago Blackhawks defenseman Ian Cole played his 1,000th NHL game, becoming the 426th player to reach the mark.
- On October 31, 2026, Pittsburgh Penguins forward Sidney Crosby recorded his 1,112 NHL assist, setting a new record for most assists with one franchise, and breaking the record previously set by Ray Bourque with the Boston Bruins.
- On November 12, 2026, Carolina Hurricanes forward Taylor Hall played his 1,000th NHL game, becoming the 427th player to reach the mark, and the first to do so in a game outside of North America.
- On November 12, 2026, Los Angeles Kings goaltender Darcy Kuemper played his 500th game, becoming the 87th goaltender to reach the mark.
- On November 14, 2026, Colorado Avalanche defenseman Brent Burns played his 1,600th NHL game, becoming the 14th player to reach the mark.
- On November 14, 2026, Dallas Stars forward Jamie Benn recorded his 1,000th NHL point, becoming the 104th player to reach the mark.
- On November 17, 2026, Anaheim Ducks forward Cutter Gauthier recorded a hat trick against the St. Louis Blues, becoming the first player in NHL history to record four hat tricks in a single month.
- On November 21, 2026, New York Islanders forward Casey Cizikas played his 1,000th NHL game, becoming the 428th player to reach the mark.

== Media rights ==
=== National ===
==== Canada ====
This is the first season of a 12-year renewal to the NHL's Canadian broadcast rights with Rogers Sports & Media. Both Amazon Prime Video and TVA Sports renewed their sub-licensing agreements with Rogers for the entire 12 years.

Rogers did not renew its sub-licensing agreement with CBC Television for Hockey Night in Canada, ending the CBC's relationship with the NHL after 74 years. The CBC maintains ownership of the HNIC brand, and will instead use it for Saturday night Professional Women's Hockey League (PWHL) games as part of its new CBC Sports Primetime anthology.

Linear television

- Saturday night games were rebranded as Saturday Night Hockey, and will continue to air across the four regional Sportsnet feeds, SN1, and SN360, with weekly doubleheaders featuring at least one Canadian team in each matchup. Sportsnet would also be able to flex more regional games from its networks to national telecasts. For the first time since the 2021–22 season, Sportsnet will have its own Tuesday opening-night doubleheader featuring Canadian teams (in previous seasons, the Tuesday opening-night only featured American teams for ESPN's U.S. media deal). Citytv and Omni Television will also no longer carry broadcasts, ending all free-to-air television coverage of the NHL in Canada; Sportsnet confirmed the cancellation of Omni's Hockey Night in Canada: Punjabi Edition on August 14, 2026.
- TVA Sports will offer French-language broadcasts of up to 350 regular season games per season, including regular season events as the Heritage Classic, Winter Classic, and All-Star Game. Out of these games, TVA will televise at least 32 Montreal Canadiens games per-season, an increase from 22.

Streaming

- Sportsnet+'s Standard plan takes over Monday Night Hockey from Amazon Prime Video. The Standard plan will also continue to simulcast all national games and in-market regional games aired on Sportsnet's linear channels, while Sportsnet+'s higher Premium plan will continue to include out-of-market games. Sportsnet+'s add-on plan via television provider authentication includes Monday Night Hockey and over 100 U.S.–U.S. games.
- Under its new deal, Amazon Prime Video takes over Wednesday Night Hockey from Sportsnet and will produce all its games in both English and French, succeeding its previous Monday Night Hockey package.

Postseason

Under the new sub-licensing deal, first- and second-round games will be split between Sportsnet-produced telecasts (either on Sportsnet, SN1, or SN360) and Amazon Prime Video. During the first round, the Sportsnet networks will have the first three choices of which series to televise, Amazon Prime Video will have the fourth and fifth choices, and the Sportsnet networks will have the remaining three series. Sportsnet will then have the first two picks of which second-round series to air, and Amazon Prime Video will pick third, and Sportsnet will air the fourth and final series. Sportsnet will exclusively televise the conference finals and the Stanley Cup Final.

Amazon Prime Video will hold French-language rights to all playoff series that it selects, aside from those featuring the Montreal Canadiens. TVA Sports will hold French-language rights to all playoff series that are televised by Sportsnet, as well as exclusive French-language rights to any series featuring the Montreal Canadiens (even if they are picked by Amazon).

==== United States ====
This is the sixth season of the league's seven-year U.S. national broadcast rights deals with the ESPN family of networks and TNT Sports.

Linear television

- ESPN continues to have the opening day tripleheader before airing games on select days throughout the regular season as its schedule permits, primarily on Tuesdays and Thursdays. ESPN also has Sunday night doubleheaders on four select weekends between late February and April. ABC's Hockey Saturday has 16 regular season games on free-to-air television across select weekends between January and April, including one doubleheader, three tripleheaders, a Saturday afternoon game on January 16 prior to the NFL Wild Card games, and a special Sunday afternoon edition on January 31 prior to the NFL Conference Championship games, and the Stadium Series, marking the first time since 2024 that the outdoor game will be on ABC instead of ESPN. ESPN and ABC will also have the All-Star skills competition and the All-Star Game, respectively.
- TNT continues to primarily carry Wednesday night games throughout the regular season, select Tuesday and Thursday games when the linear ESPN network does not have games, the Thanksgiving Showdown, the Winter Classic, and a Martin Luther King Jr. Day doubleheader. This season, the network will also have a Friday doubleheader on opening week, and one Monday game on November 16 as it features three Original Six matchups during that particular week. TNT's Sunday schedule this season includes the Heritage Classic in October, five consecutive weekends in February and March, and the last Sunday of the regular season in April. The March 21 game in particular would mark the first time under its contract that TNT will have the NHL instead of two of the Sunday night Round of 32 NCAA March Madness games (TNT will still avoid conflicting with the March Madness Regional Finals on March 28). Some of TNT's games may be simulcast on TruTV. TBS may be used as an overflow channel. Not all of TNT Sports' regular season games will be exclusive broadcasts and are subject to blackout in local markets.
- NHL Network will continue to televise games when the other national broadcasters are not airing games and will again primarily simulcast local coverage.

Streaming

- The ESPN app will continue to stream games depending on the tier. ESPN+ (the ESPN app's Select plan) will have 47 exclusive games on select days throughout this season, primarily on Tuesdays and Thursdays when the linear ESPN network does not have games. Disney+ will join Hulu this season in simulcasting ESPN+'s exclusive games. ESPN+ will also continue to have the NHL Power Play out-of-market package, and on-demand replays of every concluded NHL game regardless of broadcaster. The ESPN app's higher Unlimited plan will continue to include the live streaming of the linear ESPN Networks and ABC's games.
- HBO Max ad-free tiers will stream all TNT Sports-produced games.

Postseason

First- and second-round games will be split between ESPN-produced telecasts (either on ESPN, ABC, or ESPN2) and TNT Sports-produced telecasts (either on TNT or TBS, with selected simulcasts on TruTV). Each U.S. team's regional broadcaster will also televise local coverage of first-round games, except for any game on ABC.

The ESPN networks will have the first choice of which conference final series to air, and TNT Sports will broadcast the other conference finals. As per the alternating rotation, TNT will air the Stanley Cup Final for the third and last time under its seven-year contract.

==== Radio ====
This will be the fourth season of the league's six-year deal with SiriusXM and SiriusXM Canada to simulcast all 32 teams' local regular season and postseason broadcasts.

=== Local ===
==== Folding of FanDuel Sports Network ====
Due to continued financial difficulties, FanDuel Sports Network wound down operations after the 2025–26 season, affecting seven teams.

- The Detroit Red Wings announced an agreement with MLB Local Media to produce and distribute their games, in conjunction with its broadcast arrangements for the co-owned Detroit Tigers. Games will air via local television providers on the Detroit SportsNet channel, with direct-to-consumer streaming available via MLB.tv and the MLB app.
- The Los Angeles Kings renewed with FanDuel Sports Network West for at least the 2026–27 season after the channel was acquired by MLB's Los Angeles Angels in March 2026; the channel was later renamed "Angels Broadcast Television" (ABTV), continuing its operations as a team-owned network. On September 18, 2026, the Kings announced that it will offer a DTC service via DAZN, and extended its contract with ABTV to also cover the 2027–28 season.
  - On September 2, 2026, the Angels announced an agreement to sell the team to Colorado Avalanche owner Stan Kroenke, which owns the Denver-based RSN Altitude Sports and Entertainment.
- The Nashville Predators announced a multi-year deal with Scripps Sports, with WNPX serving as the team's flagship station, and games streaming on a DTC platform operated by DAZN subsidiary ViewLift Media.
- On July 21, 2026, the NHL announced that it would launch a new "Centralized Production Group" for local media with the Columbus Blue Jackets, St. Louis Blues, Carolina Hurricanes, and Minnesota Wild as part of its NHL Productions division, led by former MLB Network president Rob McGlarry. The "production hub" would provide centralized production and distribution support for the teams' regional broadcasts, with teams given flexibility in developing distribution and advertising models. On September 2, 2026, the NHL announced that all four teams would stream their games through branded DTC services on Amazon Prime Video, branded as Blue Jackets Hockey Network, Blue Note+, Hurricanes Hockey Network, and Wild+ respectively. These services are standalone products and do not require an Amazon Prime subscription. The NHL also reached agreements with Charter Spectrum and FuboTV to offer the broadcasts on part-time channels, and limited packages of games may be sublicensed to broadcast television.
  - Matrix Midwest acquired rights to two of the Blues' preseason games.
  - The Hurricanes will air a package of 10 games on WRAL-TV and WRAZ, primarily on Saturday nights; they will also be carried by Cox Media Group and Gray Media stations outside of the Raleigh area.
  - The Wild will air a package of 10 games on KSTP-TV and KSTC-TV.

==== Others ====
- The Montreal Canadiens renewed their regional rights with Bell Media's RDS (French) and TSN2 (English) under a multi-year deal of unspecified length.
- The Anaheim Ducks and Dallas Stars did not renew their regional rights with Victory+. On September 2, 2026, the teams announced that they would also join NHL Productions, with games streaming in-market on Prime Video for Amazon Prime subscribers (unlike the four other teams, which require separate subscriptions). Both teams also maintained the broadcast television arrangements they had under Victory+, with the Ducks continuing to air their regional games on KCOP-TV and KTTV, and the Stars maintaining a package of 17 games.
- DAZN agreed to become the direct-to-consumer streaming platform for MSG Network, the Buffalo Sabres, New Jersey Devils, New York Islanders, and New York Rangers' local broadcast partner, replacing the Gotham Sports App (its previous joint venture with the New York Yankees' YES Network). After acquiring its operator ViewLift Media from Capitals owner Ted Leonsis, Monumental Sports Network's streaming platform Monumental+ also became available on DAZN.

==== Personnel ====
- TV analyst Eddie Olczyk stepped down from his duties with the Seattle Kraken after four seasons. However, he will continue with his role as lead analyst on TNT's NHL broadcasts.
- On July 29, 2026, the Columbus Blue Jackets announced that they would part ways with their radio play-by-play announcer Bob McElligott after 17 years; the team will switch to using a simulcast of the television commentary.

==== Radio ====
- On July 7, 2026, Rogers Sports & Media closed six news and sports stations nationwide as part of cutbacks, including the Calgary Flames' home of 960 CFAC and the Vancouver Canucks' home of 650 CISL.
  - Rogers retained the rights to the Canucks, and announced that their broadcasts would move to 104.9/107.5/92.5 Kiss West Coast.
  - On August 12, 2026, the Calgary Flames announced that they would move to 770 CHQR under a five-year deal with Corus Radio.

==== Personnel ====
- The Toronto Maple Leafs announced that Todd Crocker will replace Joe Bowen as the team's radio play-by-play announcer. Crocker previously served 13 seasons as the voice of the Maple Leafs' American Hockey League (AHL) affiliate, the Toronto Marlies.
- The Anaheim Ducks announced that Aaron Cooney will replace Steve Carroll as the team's radio play-by-play announcer. Cooney previously served three seasons as the voice of the Ducks' AHL affiliate, the San Diego Gulls.

=== International ===
- The international streaming service NHL.TV will be available in around 200 countries on DAZN.
- This will be the first season of NHL Monday Night Hockey, and the ninth season of both NHL Saturday and NHL Sunday broadcasts, across selected European broadcasters.
- This will be the first season of a new five-year deal with Viaplay to stream games in the Nordic countries.
- ESPN will additionally air its slate of games in Latin America, Brazil, the Caribbean, sub-Saharan Africa, Oceania and the Netherlands, and will air games through Disney+ in select markets in Asia and Europe.
- In Australia, the Nine Network will continue to air a match per week on Saturday mornings across its 9Go! and 9Gem digital channels, and its 9Now streaming service.

== See also ==
- 2026–27 NHL transactions
- 2026–27 NHL suspensions and fines
- List of 2026–27 NHL Three Star Awards
- 2026 in sports
- 2027 in sports
