= List of current NHL emergency back-up goaltenders =

This is a list of current emergency back-up goaltenders in the National Hockey League. Due to the importance and specialized nature of the goaltender position in ice hockey, the National Hockey League requires teams to have a minimum of two professional goaltenders on their active rosters and an amateur, emergency back-up goaltender (EBUG) in situations where all professional goaltenders on a team are unable to play. Until the end of the 2025–26 NHL season, EBUGs were provided by the home team to be available to either team (home or visiting) and their identities were not generally known unless activated during a game; starting in the 2026–27 NHL season, the NHL began requiring each team to employ their own EBUGs who travel with the team, are permitted to have other non-player team duties (such as coaching, broadcasting, scouting, or practice), and whose identities are disclosed prior to the start of season or game. If a team maintains three or more professional goaltenders on their active roster, said team is still required to hire a permanent EBUG but is not required to have their EBUG present for a game. EBUGs are required to wear 00 as their uniform number. As of the 2026–27 NHL season, 31 of 32 NHL teams maintain the required minimum one EBUG, with the exception of the Montreal Canadiens who have two under contract.

== Current NHL emergency back-up goaltenders ==
Updated October 26, 2026

| No. | Nat | Player | Pos | S/G | Age | Acquired | Birthplace | Contract |
|---|---|---|---|---|---|---|---|---|
| 00 | (United States) | Devon Bobak | G | L | 24 | 2026 | Northwood, Ohio | Ducks |
| 00 | (United States) | Kyle Chauvette | G | R | 25 | 2026 | Goffstown, New Hampshire | Bruins |
| 00 | (Canada) | Jack McNaughton | G | R | 24 | 2026 | Calgary, Alberta | Sabres |
| 00 | (Canada) | Dusty Nickel | G | L | 35 | 2026 | Calgary, Alberta | Flames |
| 00 | (United States) | Jorge Alves | G | L | 47 | 2026 | Stoughton, Massachusetts | Hurricanes |
| 00 | (United States) | Jackson Bernard | G | L | 25 | 2026 | Huntley, Illinois | Blackhawks |
| 00 | (United States) | Will Slohm | G | L | 27 | 2026 | Litchfield, Connecticut | Avalanche |
| 00 | (United States) | Reid Robertson | G | | 26–27 | 2026 | Plano, Texas | Blue Jackets |
| 00 | (United States) | Jack Williams | G | L | 25 | 2026 | St. Louis, Missouri | Stars |
| 00 | (United States) | Mason Kucenski | G | L | 24 | 2026 | Gill, Massachusetts | Red Wings |
| 00 | (Canada) | Brett Epp | G | L | 28 | 2026 | Edmonton, Alberta | Oilers |
| 00 | (United States) | Noah Altman | G | L | 26 | 2026 | Los Angeles, California | Panthers |
| 00 | (Canada) | Sean Maguire | G | L | 33 | 2026 | Edmonton, Alberta | Kings |
| 00 | (United States) | Peter Thome | G | | 29 | 2026 | Minneapolis, Minnesota | Wild |
| 00 | (Canada) | Daniel Harvey | G | | | 2026 | Quebec | Canadiens |
| 00 | (Canada) | Nicolas Ruccia | G | L | 22 | 2026 | Laval, Quebec | Canadiens |
| 00 | (United States) | Dillon Caffrey | G | L | 32–33 | 2026 | Mount Juliet, Tennessee | Predators |
| 00 | (United States) | Kyle Shapiro | G | L | 33 | 2026 | Ocean, New Jersey | Devils |
| 00 | (United States) | Thomas Sullivan | G | L | 28 | 2026 | Floral Park, New York | Islanders |
| 00 | (United States) | Remington Keopple | G | L | 24 | 2026 | Hudson, Wisconsin | Rangers |
| 00 | (Canada) | Bradley Mitchell | G | L | 24 | 2026 | Carleton Place, Ontario | Senators |
| 00 | (Canada) | Mike Chiasson | G | L | 40 | 2026 | Cole Harbour, Nova Scotia | Flyers |
| 00 | (Canada) | Nathan Airey | G | L | 23 | 2026 | Cochrane, Alberta | Sharks |
| 00 | (United States) | Dolan Gilbert | G | L | 25 | 2026 | South Bend, Indiana | Kraken |
| 00 | (United States) | Jack Caruso | G | R | 27 | 2026 | St. Louis, Missouri | Blues |
| 00 | (United States) | Kyle Konin | G | L | 28 | 2026 | West Kingston, Rhode Island | Lightning |
| 00 | (Canada) | Brandon Bonello | G | L | 27 | 2026 | Mississauga, Ontario | Maple Leafs |
| 00 | (United States) | Colten McIntyre | G | L | 22 | 2026 | Park City, Utah | Mammoth |
| 00 | (Canada) | Alex Trinca | G | | | 2026 | | Canucks |
| 00 | (Canada) | Daren Millard | G | | 56 | 2026 | Dauphin, Manitoba | Golden Knights |
| 00 | (United States) | Connor Leslie | G | L | 25 | 2026 | Leesburg, Virginia | Capitals |
| 00 | (Canada) | Cole Kehler | G | R | 28 | 2026 | Altona, Manitoba | Jets |
