= Jody Shelley =

Canadian ice hockey player

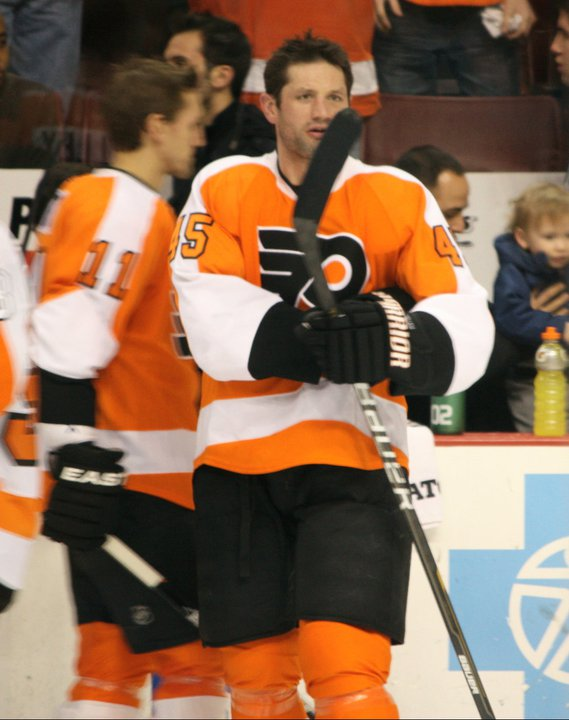
- Shelley with the Philadelphia Flyers in 2011
- Born: February 7, 1976 (age 50) Thompson, Manitoba, Canada
- Height: 6 ft 4 in (193 cm)
- Weight: 230 lb (104 kg; 16 st 6 lb)
- Position: Left wing
- Shot: Left
- Played for: Columbus Blue Jackets; San Jose Sharks; New York Rangers; Philadelphia Flyers
- NHL draft: Undrafted
- Playing career: 1998–2013

Jody Shelley (born February 7, 1976) is a Canadian former professional ice hockey left winger. He is a current broadcaster as a studio analyst and color commentator with FanDuel Sports Network Ohio and Monday Night Hockey. During his National Hockey League (NHL) career he played for the Columbus Blue Jackets, San Jose Sharks, New York Rangers and the Philadelphia Flyers.

He was known as an enforcer and had the most regular season major penalties for fighting since he joined the league; when he retired – on August 9, 2013 – he had 173. Shelley rejoined the Columbus Blue Jackets in August 2013 when he was named a broadcast associate and team ambassador.

== Early life ==
Born in Thompson, Manitoba, Shelley moved to Yarmouth, Nova Scotia when he was 12 for his father to work at a tin mine operated by Rio Algom in East Kemptville. He attended Yarmouth Consolidated Memorial High School, graduating in 1994. He was involved in a number of competitive sports in his high school years, including hockey, swimming, and soccer, as well as a brief stint on the volleyball team.

== Playing career ==
Shelley began playing hockey in the Yarmouth County Minor Hockey Association until his midget year. He moved away from Yarmouth, Nova Scotia when he was 18 to play for the Halifax Mooseheads of the Quebec Major Junior Hockey League. Shelley then played 19 games for Dalhousie University before being signed by the Saint John Flames in the AHL to make his pro debut. Jody Shelley was signed as a free agent by the Calgary Flames on September 1, 1998, but never played for them. He played until 2000 with Saint John.

Almost 2 years later, on August 17, 2000, he was signed as a free agent by the Columbus Blue Jackets and played one game for them in the 2000–01 season. During that one game, he had ten minutes in penalties. After that, he played fairly regularly as the Blue Jackets' enforcer averaging over 200 minutes in penalties a season. He fought Bob Probert in each of the three periods in a 2–1 Blue Jackets loss to the Chicago Blackhawks at the United Center on January 10, 2002. The three fights by the same two adversaries in a single NHL match would next be achieved fourteen years later when Evander Kane and Alex Petrovic did it on February 9, 2016. During the 2003–04 NHL season, he got into a career-high 30 fights. He played five-and-a-half seasons for the Blue Jackets.

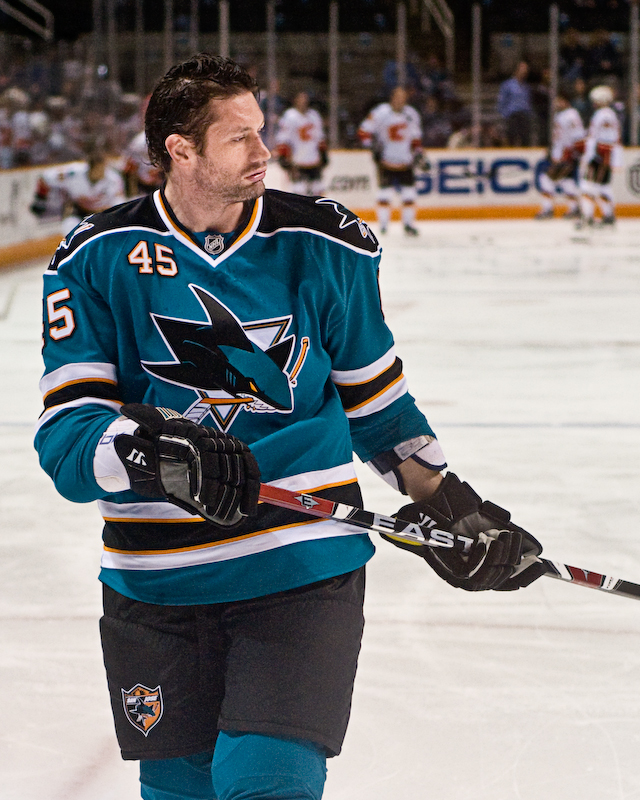
Shelley during warmups with the San Jose Sharks in 2008.

On January 29, 2008, he was traded to the San Jose Sharks for a sixth-round draft pick in 2009 and he re-signed with the Sharks in the off-season. In a 2008 regular season match against the Dallas Stars, Sean Avery hit Brad Lukowich and after the incident, Shelley and Avery began to throw water and Gatorade at each other while jawing at each other.

Two years after joining San Jose, on February 12, 2010, Shelley was traded by the Sharks to the Rangers for a conditional sixth-round draft pick.

On July 1, 2010, Shelley signed a three-year contract with the Philadelphia Flyers.

On September 20, 2011, Shelley was suspended for the remainder of the preseason and 5 regular season games for boarding Darryl Boyce.

On August 9, 2013, with no NHL contract offers following the expiration of his deal with the Flyers, he announced his retirement from professional hockey and joined the team he started his NHL career with (the Blue Jackets) on a front office job.

== International play ==
During the 2004–2005 NHL Lockout, Shelley played for the JYP in the Finnish SM-Liiga. He played 11 games in the regular season with no goals, one assist and 20 penalty minutes. During the playoffs he played 3 games with no points and 25 penalty minutes.

== Broadcasting career ==
In May 2014, he became the Blue Jackets television color analyst alongside Jeff Rimer.

Over his career, he has also served as an analyst for NHL on NBC, NHL Network (American TV channel) and NHL on TNT.

In April 2024, Canadian NHL broadcast rightsholder Rogers Communications announced that it had struck a deal to shift a portion of its rights – specifically the Monday night games played in Canada – from its own NHL on Sportsnet broadcast to Amazon Prime Video for the 2024–25 and 2025–26 regular seasons. In September, it was announced that Shelley would alternate with Shane Hnidy (both of whom have non-Prime NHL broadcast gigs) to provide colour commentary on Prime Monday Night Hockey, which launched with a game in Montreal on October 14, 2024. It was confirmed that Shelley would also continue with the Blue Jackets broadcasts on FanDuel Sports Network Ohio, alongside new (for 2024–25) play-by-play announcer Steve Mears.

== Personal life ==
In addition to Shelley's duties on Blue Jackets broadcasts, he represents the club as a team ambassador where he spearheads the organization of the Blue Jackets Player Alumni Association.

Shelley hosts the Jody Shelley Golf Fore Health in his hometown of Yarmouth every summer which raises money for hospital equipment. As of June 2018, the event has raised over $480,000 in support of Yarmouth Regional Hospital.

The Town of Yarmouth declared July 13, 2013, as Jody Shelley Day, and honoured Shelley by renaming Cottage Street as Jody Shelley Drive, and also renumbering the Mariners Centre, the local winter sports facility, as 45 Jody Shelley Drive, after his jersey number.

== Records ==
- Also holds the single season record for penalty minutes (357) for the Syracuse Crunch of the American Hockey League
- Holds single-game penalty minutes record for the San Jose Sharks. (41)
- His sweater number, 25, was retired from the Halifax Mooseheads.

== Career statistics ==
Bold indicates led league

=== Regular season and playoffs ===
			Regular season					Playoffs
Season	Team	League	GP	G	A	Pts	PIM	GP	G	A	Pts	PIM
1994–95	Halifax Mooseheads	QMJHL	72	10	12	22	194	7	0	1	1	12
1995–96	Halifax Mooseheads	QMJHL	50	13	19	32	319	6	0	2	2	36
1996–97	Halifax Mooseheads	QMJHL	59	25	19	44	420	17	6	6	12	125
1997–98	Dalhousie University	AUAA	19	6	11	17	145	—	—	—	—	—
1997–98	Saint John Flames	AHL	18	1	1	2	50	—	—	—	—	—
1998–99	Johnstown Chiefs	ECHL	51	12	17	29	325	—	—	—	—	—
1998–99	Saint John Flames	AHL	8	0	0	0	46	—	—	—	—	—
1999–00	Saint John Flames	AHL	22	1	4	5	93	3	0	0	0	2
1999–00	Johnstown Chiefs	ECHL	36	9	17	26	256	—	—	—	—	—
2000–01	Syracuse Crunch	AHL	69	1	7	8	**357**	5	0	0	0	21
2000–01	Columbus Blue Jackets	NHL	1	0	0	0	10	—	—	—	—	—
2001–02	Columbus Blue Jackets	NHL	52	3	3	6	206	—	—	—	—	—
2001–02	Syracuse Crunch	AHL	22	3	5	8	165	—	—	—	—	—
2002–03	Columbus Blue Jackets	NHL	68	1	4	5	**249**	—	—	—	—	—
2003–04	Columbus Blue Jackets	NHL	76	3	3	6	228	—	—	—	—	—
2004–05	JYP	FIN	11	0	1	1	20	3	0	0	0	25
2005–06	Columbus Blue Jackets	NHL	80	3	7	10	163	—	—	—	—	—
2006–07	Columbus Blue Jackets	NHL	72	1	1	2	125	—	—	—	—	—
2007–08	Columbus Blue Jackets	NHL	31	0	0	0	44	—	—	—	—	—
2007–08	San Jose Sharks	NHL	31	1	6	7	91	6	0	0	0	2
2008–09	San Jose Sharks	NHL	70	2	2	4	116	1	0	0	0	0
2009–10	San Jose Sharks	NHL	36	0	3	3	78	—	—	—	—	—
2009–10	New York Rangers	NHL	21	2	4	6	37	—	—	—	—	—
2010–11	Philadelphia Flyers	NHL	58	2	2	4	127	2	0	0	0	2
2011–12	Philadelphia Flyers	NHL	30	0	1	1	64	—	—	—	—	—
2012–13	Philadelphia Flyers	NHL	1	0	0	0	0	—	—	—	—	—
NHL totals			627	18	36	54	1538	9	0	0	0	4
