= NHL on Prime Video =

Branding for NHL games streamed on Amazon Prime Video

- Also known as: Canada: Prime Wednesday Night Hockey presented by DoorDash (2026–present); Prime Monday Night Hockey (2024–2026)
- Genre: NHL hockey telecasts
- Presented by: Studio Host: Adnan Virk; Play-by-play: John Forslund
- Starring: Rinkside Reporter: Andi Petrillo; Analysts: Jody Shelley (Colour Commentator); Shane Hnidy (Guest); Thomas Hickey (Between the Benches); Chris Pronger (Studio Analyst); Tyson Nash (Guest); Blake Bolden (Studio Analyst); Features Reporter: Christine Simpson
- Theme music composer: Andrew Lockington
- Opening theme: "NHL on Prime Video Theme"
- Country of origin: Canada
- Original languages: English; French (since 2026)

Production
- Camera setup: Multi-camera
- Running time: 180 minutes or until end of the game

Original release
- Network: Amazon Prime Video
- Release: October 14, 2024 – present

Related
- NHL on Sportsnet; NHL on ESPN / NHL on ABC (U.S. rightsholders); NHL on TNT (U.S. rightsholders)

The NHL on Prime Video is a presentation of the National Hockey League broadcast by Amazon Prime Video in Canada. The package debuted in the 2024–25 season as Prime Monday Night Hockey, as part of a sublicensing agreement with national rightsholder Rogers Sports & Media (replacing a package of games previously aired by Sportsnet).

In the 2026–27 season, Amazon renewed the sublicense as part of Rogers' own renewal of its NHL media rights, which will see Prime's games move to Wednesday nights, and the service also receiving rights to selected first- and second-round playoff series.

In the United States, Amazon is not part of the NHL's national broadcast rights, but holds in-market streaming rights to regional games from seven teams as of the 2026–27 season. These broadcasts are produced by the respective team or through NHL Productions, and may also be available through other outlets such as broadcast stations and ad-hoc agreements with local television providers; the Anaheim Ducks, Dallas Stars, and Seattle Kraken are available to Prime subscribers within their respective markets, while the Carolina Hurricanes, Columbus Blue Jackets, Minnesota Wild, and St. Louis Blues offer standalone subscriptions hosted on the Prime Video platform.

== History ==
=== Monday Night Hockey (2024–2026) ===
Former logo as Monday Night Hockey

On April 25, 2024, the NHL and Rogers Communications announced that Amazon had signed a two-year deal to produce and exclusively stream NHL game telecasts on Monday nights in Canada on Amazon Prime Video under the Prime Monday Night Hockey brand. The agreement follows the addition of Sportsnet's OTT streaming service, Sportsnet+, as a Prime Video Channel in October 2023.

On June 13, 2024, Prime Video announced it would air a weekly whip-around studio show, NHL Coast to Coast, on Thursday nights.

=== Wednesday Night Hockey (2026–present) ===
On July 28, 2026, Rogers and Amazon announced a 12-year renewal of the sublicensing agreement, aligned with the new NHL broadcasting contract beginning in the 2026–27 season. As part of the agreement, Prime's exclusive national games will move to Wednesday nights as Wednesday Night Hockey, holding rights to 26 games per-season (and replacing Sportsnet's previous Scotiabank Wednesday Night Hockey telecasts). Prime will also hold exclusive rights to two first-round series and one second-round series in the Stanley Cup playoffs per-season. Unlike the previous contract, Amazon will also hold exclusive French-language rights to all games it televises, aside from playoff series involving the Montreal Canadiens (whose French rights will be held exclusively by TVA Sports).

== Personnel ==
On September 23, 2024, Prime Video revealed the broadcast and studio team for Monday Night Hockey. The studio team is led by hosts Adnan Virk and Andi Petrillo, analyst Blake Bolden, and contributor Mark Messier. Game announcers include Seattle Kraken and TNT play-by-play announcer John Forslund, along with Columbus Blue Jackets TV colour commentator Jody Shelley, Vegas Golden Knights TV colour commentator Shane Hnidy, and New York Islanders TV colour commentator Thomas Hickey.

== Regional rights in the United States ==
In the 2024–25 season, Amazon Prime Video reached an agreement with the Seattle Kraken to serve as the in-market streaming outlet for the Kraken Hockey Network (which replaced Root Sports Northwest as its regional broadcaster), with regionally-televised Kraken games available on the platform for Amazon Prime subscribers within the team's market. The broadcasts also air on a network of broadcast television affiliates led by KONG/KING-TV in Seattle.

In the 2026–27 season, Prime Video reached streaming agreements with six more teams, including the Carolina Hurricanes, Columbus Blue Jackets, Minnesota Wild, and St. Louis Blues — moving from FanDuel Sports Network, and the Anaheim Ducks and Dallas Stars — moving from Victory+. The Ducks and Stars will be available to Prime subscribers, and both teams will maintain the broadcast television arrangements they had under Victory+ (with the Ducks continuing to simulcast all 65 of its regional games on KCOP/Los Angeles, and the Stars maintaining a package of 17 games).

The Hurricanes (Hurricanes Hockey Network), Blue Jackets (Blue Jackets Hockey Network), Wild (Wild+), and Blues (Blue Note+) offer standalone subscription services on the Prime Video platform, and will also distribute games via partnerships with television providers in their market, and packages of games on broadcast television. All six teams utilize NHL Productions' newly-established regional production hub for their telecasts.

Preceded by none	NHL English pay television carrier in Canada; 2024–present with Sportsnet	Succeeded by none
