= Altcast =

Secondary broadcast of a sporting event

An alternate broadcast, also known as an altcast, is a secondary broadcast feed of a sporting event. Altcasts are designed to showcase an event from a different perspective, including specialty camera angles, extended analysis, simulcasts with alternative commentary (including personality-based broadcasts containing entertainment elements, or geared towards specific demographics), and other unconventional formats. These broadcasts are sometimes carried on secondary linear channels owned by the event's rightsholder, but are more often carried on digital platforms.

== History ==
After its launch in 1993, ESPN experimented with using its new sister channel ESPN2 to carry alternative broadcasts of events from the main network, such as carrying a CART race entirely from the perspective of in-car cameras in 1994. In March 2006, to mark the one-year anniversary of the launch of its college sports channel ESPNU, ESPN introduced a format known as "ESPN Full Circle" during a North Carolina–Duke college basketball game; ESPN would carry a traditional telecast, while ESPN2 would carry an "above the rim" camera angle, ESPNU would carry a feed focusing on Duke's student section, the network's broadband service ESPN 360 carried a statistics-focused feed, while ESPN.com and Mobile ESPN offered supplemental digital content and interactive features (such as polls and chat rooms). ESPN reported a total viewership of 3.78 million viewers across all channels (with 3.5 million watching the traditional telecast), making it the network's most-watched college basketball game since 1990. The following month, the Masters Tournament in golf would begin experimenting with supplemental webcasts alongside its traditionally-limited television coverage, introducing an "Amen Corner Live" feed focusing upon Augusta National's 11th, 12th, and 13th holes.

ESPN would extend the Full Circle concept to other events, including a 2006 NBA playoffs opening game between the Chicago Bulls and Miami Heat in April (which featured most of the aforementioned offerings from the North Carolina–Duke game), and a Florida–Florida State football game in September—in which a split-screen feed of eight camera angles (including isolated shots of the teams' coaches and starting quarterbacks) was shown on ESPN2, and a skycam feed aired on ESPNU. The Los Angeles Times reported that the ESPN2 broadcast faced a mixed reaction from viewers, with one considering the split-screen format to be the "stupidest" thing they had ever seen in a sports broadcast since Fox's "glowing" hockey puck.

In 2014, ESPN revamped the Full Circle concept for the BCS National Championship Game as the "Megacast", with its networks carrying broadcasts such as "BCS Title Talk" (featuring celebrity guests discussing the game), a "Film Room" broadcast on ESPNU with extended examinations of plays by a panel of analysts, a commentary-free feed on ESPN Classic, a "Command Center" with on-screen stats on ESPN Goal Line, and other viewing options on ESPN3 (including feeds with audio from the teams' respective radio networks, and additional camera shots focused on their respective players). These offerings would continue into the College Football Playoff era, with other concepts such as special editions of Paul Finebaum's radio show on SEC Network (particularly when a team from said conference is participating), and broadcasts with alumni of the opposing teams as analysts.

In 2021, ESPN2 began to carry Monday Night Football with Peyton and Eli during selected Monday Night Football games, which featured brothers Peyton and Eli Manning discussing the game with celebrities and sports personalities. The entertainment-oriented broadcasts proved to be critically successful, and received a Sports Emmy Award for Outstanding Live Sports Series in 2022. ESPN would enter into a long-term agreement with the Mannings' Omaha Productions to produce altcasts in a similar format for other ESPN sports properties (such as college football broadcasts featuring Pat McAfee). They also influenced similar offerings from networks such as TNT, which in 2024 broadcast a feed of the NBA All-Star Game featuring Inside the NBA panelist Charles Barkley and the Golden State Warriors' Draymond Green.

While an altcast may not be necessarily viewed as widely as the main telecast of an event, they can help expand interest in an event among wider demographics (such as casual viewers). They have also provided additional sponsorship opportunities, such as altcasts dealing in statistics often being sponsored by technology firms such as Amazon Web Services or Microsoft.

== Types and examples ==
=== Alternate commentary ===
A common form of altcast are feeds with different commentators to provide supplemental perspectives of an event. Examples of these can include:

- Feeds featuring current players or alumni as analysts (such as TNT's "Players Only" NBA telecasts). In some cases (such as ESPN's "Homer Telecast" format), the color commentators may be alumni associated with the two participating teams, joined by a play-by-play announcer as a neutral third-party.
- Feeds with coverage specific to the participating teams, such as dedicated commentators and guests closely associated with the team or their region; Turner Sports used this format for the semi-finals of the NCAA men's basketball tournament. Alternatively, a feed may offer a simulcast of a team's respective radio network in place of the television commentary.
- Feeds featuring the panel of a studio show or podcast as commentators.
- Feeds with commentary in local minority languages:
  - Hockey Night in Canada often presented one-off broadcasts of National Hockey League games in Canada's minority and Indigenous languages as part of its annual "Hockey Day in Canada" event, including Cantonese, Cree, Hindi, Inuktitut, Italian (in partnership with TLN), Punjabi, and Tagalog. CBC Sports, and later Rogers' Omni Television, would go on to produce a regular schedule of Hockey Night broadcasts with Punjabi-language commentary. Rogers would also partner with the Aboriginal Peoples Television Network (APTN) to produce packages of games in Plains Cree and Inuktitut.
  - During selected Thursday Night Football games, Amazon Prime Video offered an alternate commentary track with soccer commentators Ross Dyer and Tommy Smyth; the feed was designed for international viewers unfamiliar with the rules of football.
- Feeds structured as an entertainment-oriented "watch-along", with the main hosts joined by special guests such as sports personalities and non-sports celebrities for discussions and interviews.
  - In 2018 and 2019, Prime Video partnered with Funny or Die to present a comedic broadcast of the Rose Parade in Pasadena, California, hosted by Will Ferrell and Molly Shannon, joined by fellow Saturday Night Live cast member Tim Meadows as a reporter. Ferrell and Shannon presented the broadcast as the characters Cord Hosenbeck and Tish Cattigan, who were stated to have been veteran local newscasters.
  - In 2025, Peacock aired a Reality Hot Seat broadcast of Sunday Night Football featuring reality television personalities (such as Heather Gay and Rob Mariano of The Real Housewives of Salt Lake City and The Traitors respectively) as guests.
  - During the 2026 Winter Olympics, Peacock aired coverage of the United States' quarter-final game in men's hockey with commentary by rapper and celebrity correspondent Snoop Dogg; unusually, this altcast was only offered during the third period.
  - During the 2026 FIFA World Cup, Fox partnered with IShowSpeed to offer simulcasts of matches alongside his own livestreams.

=== Statistics and analysis ===
Some altcasts are built around analysis and analytics, including additional graphics with specialized statistics, commentary and analysis based around statistics, and the use of augmented reality graphics to visualize plays and statistics in real-time.

- A recurring "Megacast" offering on ESPN's college football coverage was the "Film Room", which featured a panel of analysts—usually including current and former coaches—performing extended breakdowns and analysis of plays and calls.
- In 2024, NBC Sports first presented an NFL altcast sponsored by the Madden NFL video game franchise, which featured video game-style visualizations of play options and routes, and commentary by Chad Johnson and Kurt Benkert incorporating discussions related to topics such as in-game player ratings.
- A similar type of altcast format is centered around sports betting, with coverage of the game being presented from the perspective of odds, props, and futures.

=== Whiparound and split-screen broadcasts ===
A "whiparound" show is a format used for broadcasts featuring rolling coverage of multiple, simultaneous sporting events. These broadcasts typically feature real-time highlights, curated views of multiple live games in a split-screen format, and isolated "look-ins" on games where potentially significant events are about to occur (such as when a team has a scoring chance).

An early example of this format was seen in Italy's Serie A soccer league in the early-2000s; Fox Sports' Eric Shanks witnessed such a broadcast being produced by Italian television provider Telepiu (which had just been acquired by News Corporation as part of the formation of Sky Italia), realizing it could work well for the NFL. After joining DirecTV in 2003, Shanks oversaw its acquisition of exclusive rights to NFL Sunday Ticket beginning in 2005, and the debut of its whiparound service—the Red Zone Channel. The NFL itself would later produce its own similar broadcast known as NFL RedZone.

In some sports leagues, whiparound broadcasts are not necessarily one-off altcasts, but a regular, standalone program that may be a component of a cable network or out-of-market sports package, such as NFL RedZone (which is distributed as part of NFL Network and NFL Sunday Ticket), MLB Big Inning (which is distributed as part of MLB.tv and the MLB Network over-the-top subscription), MLS 360 (on Apple TV), CBS Sports' The Golazo Show (UEFA Champions League and Europa League), and ESPN's former Goal Line/Buzzer Beater/Bases Loaded channel (which formerly operated during the college football season, college basketball season, and the NCAA Division I baseball and softball tournaments respectively).

Whiparound feeds have also been used as part of one-off altcasts and special events; NBC has offered the Gold Zone for its coverage of the Olympic Games on Peacock (which has featured RedZone hosts such as Scott Hanson), while ESPN has televised occasional whiparound specials such as MLB Squeeze Play (which is broadcast during the Wild Card Series, and aired several Wednesday-night editions in 2024 to cover the final weeks of the regular season), and NHL Frozen Frenzy—an event held since 2023 where all National Hockey League teams play games with staggered start times, and ESPN2 and ESPN+ aired a whiparound feed of all games in progress alongside a national tripleheader on ESPN. Since 2008, ESPN has broadcast the NCAA Division I Men's Wrestling Championships with a similar split-screen format, with the early rounds offering a "quad-box" view of four simultaneous matches, and isolated coverage of individual matches available via streaming. From 2001 to 2024, Fox Sports 1 held a whiparound event on the opening day of college basketball season known as the Big East Opening Night Tip-Off, which carried six simultaneous Big East basketball games as part of the opening night of college basketball season. The format returned yearly for the opening of each college basketball season until 2025, following the Big East's new television deals with Fox Sports and ESPN.

TNT Sports introduced a whiparound broadcast for the French Open in 2025, which aired daily on TruTV during the early rounds of the tournament. After acquiring NFL Network in 2026, ESPN gained ownership of the "RedZone" brand; in August 2026, it was announced that ESPN would produce a whiparound feed for the opening week of the US Open under the RedZone at the US Open branding.

=== Youth and family-oriented broadcasts ===
There have been notable instances of alternate broadcasts tailored towards youth and family audiences, with some leveraging the use of player tracking technologies to create entertainment-oriented features.

- ESPN has offered a "KidsCast" broadcast for the Little League World Series and MLB Little League Classic, featuring students of the Bruce Beck School of Broadcasting.
- Since 2021, CBS Sports and sister network Nickelodeon have partnered on altcasts of selected games aimed towards family co-viewing; all of the games have been called by Noah Eagle (son of sportscaster Ian Eagle) and Nate Burleson, usually joined in the booth by one or more cast members of a Nickelodeon series (such as SpongeBob SquarePants voice actors Tom Kenny and Bill Fagerbakke, in character as SpongeBob and Patrick Star respectively). The games have included augmented reality "filter" effects (such as a geyser of the network's trademark green slime on a touchdown, and replays with visual effects added to them), cameo appearances by other Nickelodeon characters as "reporters", attendees, or to provide additional explanations of rules, as well as other youth-centric features. These efforts culminated at Super Bowl LVIII in 2024, where CBS provided the Super Bowl's first-ever altcast.
- On May 3, 2021, ESPN presented a Marvel Comics-themed altcast for an NBA game between the New Orleans Pelicans and Golden State Warriors entitled Marvel Arena of Heroes; the broadcast contained Marvel-themed graphics, as well as augmented reality filters and character appearances. The broadcast placed a focus on three star players from each team, who accumulated "hero points" based on their in-game performance (with a storyline of the Avengers looking to recruit the highest-scoring player). It also featured guest contributions by Angélique Roché, host of the Marvel's Voices podcast.
- In 2022, Prime Video partnered with the sports comedy troupe Dude Perfect to host a family-oriented altcast for selected Thursday Night Football games, interspersing coverage of the game with segments incorporating the troupe's signature trick shots and stunts.

==== Animated recreations ====
Altcasts featuring 3D animated recreations of live games began to emerge in the 2020s. A 2023 ESPN NHL altcast was themed around the Disney Channel animated series Big City Greens, with players represented by avatars of characters from the series; Vincent Trocheck of the New York Rangers and Evgeny Kuznetsov of the Washington Capitals were represented by the series' lead characters Cricket and Tilly Green, with their respective voice actors providing live facial motion capture. The broadcast used technology from Beyond Sports, which leveraged the NHL's recently introduced player and puck tracking system. In 2024, TruTV aired a similar production using various Warner Bros. Discovery-owned characters (including Cartoon Network and DC Comics properties), as a promotional tie-in for the Warner Bros.-published video game MultiVersus.

Beyond would later collaborate with NHL Productions on a regular Hockeyverse franchise, which includes a weekly television series for NHL Network that features animated highlights from a featured game, as well as themed, full-length game broadcasts in collaboration with regional team broadcasters such as NESN (Boston Bruins) and Sportsnet (Calgary Flames). Beyond also worked with ESPN on a Toy Story-themed broadcast in a similar style for an NFL London Game in 2023, and the Disney-themed Dunk the Halls for NBA Christmas Day games in 2024.
