= Shane Hnidy =

Canadian ice hockey player

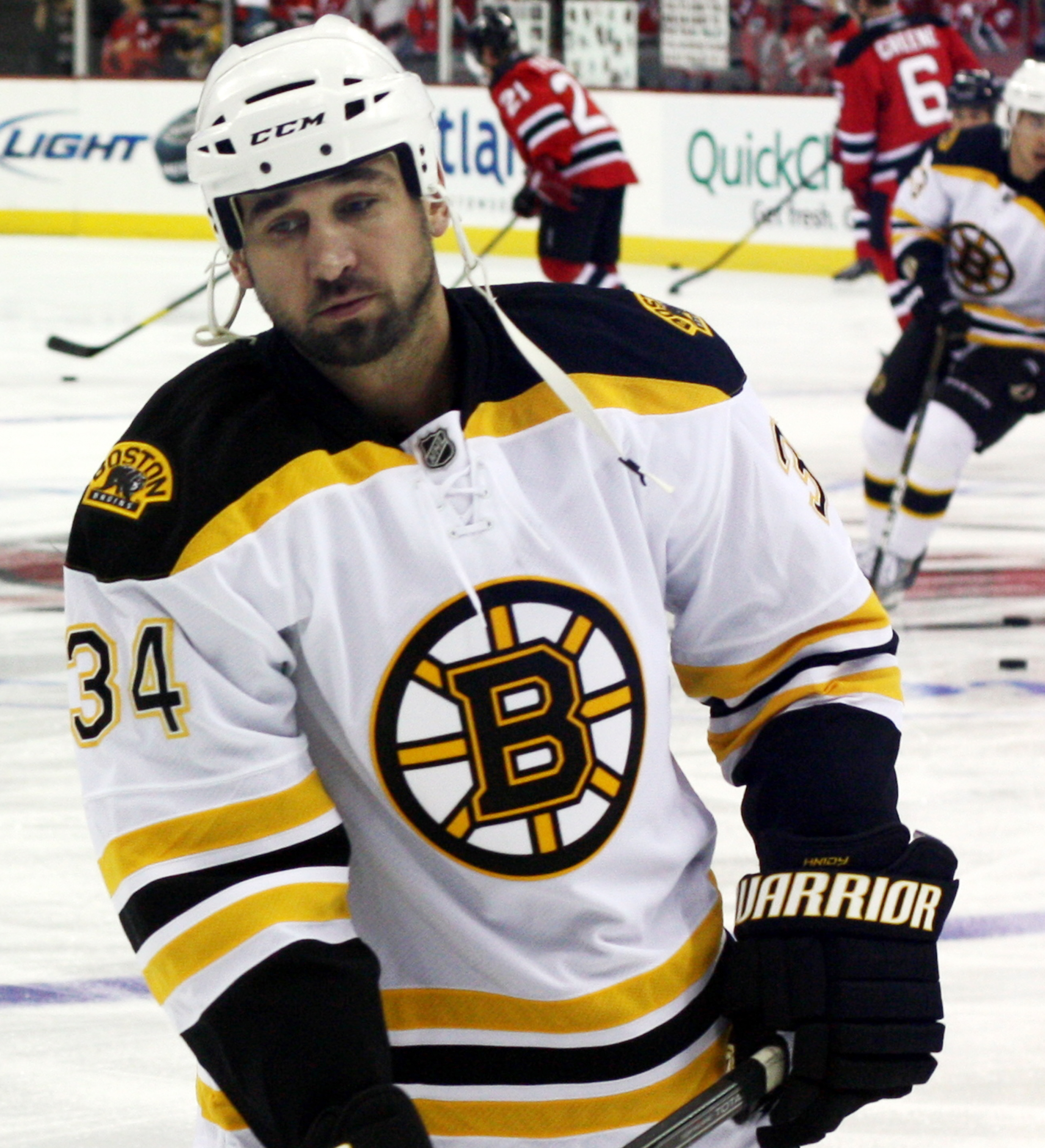
- Hnidy in 2011.
- Born: November 8, 1975 (age 51) Neepawa, Manitoba, Canada
- Height: 6 ft 1 in (185 cm)
- Weight: 204 lb (93 kg; 14 st 8 lb)
- Position: Defence
- Shot: Right
- Played for: Ottawa Senators; Nashville Predators; Atlanta Thrashers; Anaheim Ducks; Boston Bruins; Minnesota Wild
- NHL draft: 173rd overall, 1994; Buffalo Sabres
- Playing career: 1996–2011

Shane Hnidy (/ˈnaɪdiː/ NY-dee; born November 8, 1975) is a Canadian former professional ice hockey defenceman. Between 2000 and 2011, he played in the National Hockey League (NHL) for the Ottawa Senators, Nashville Predators, Atlanta Thrashers, Anaheim Ducks, Boston Bruins, and Minnesota Wild. He is currently part of the Vegas Golden Knights broadcast team on Scripps Sports as well as the Monday Night Hockey broadcast on Amazon Prime Video.

== Playing career ==
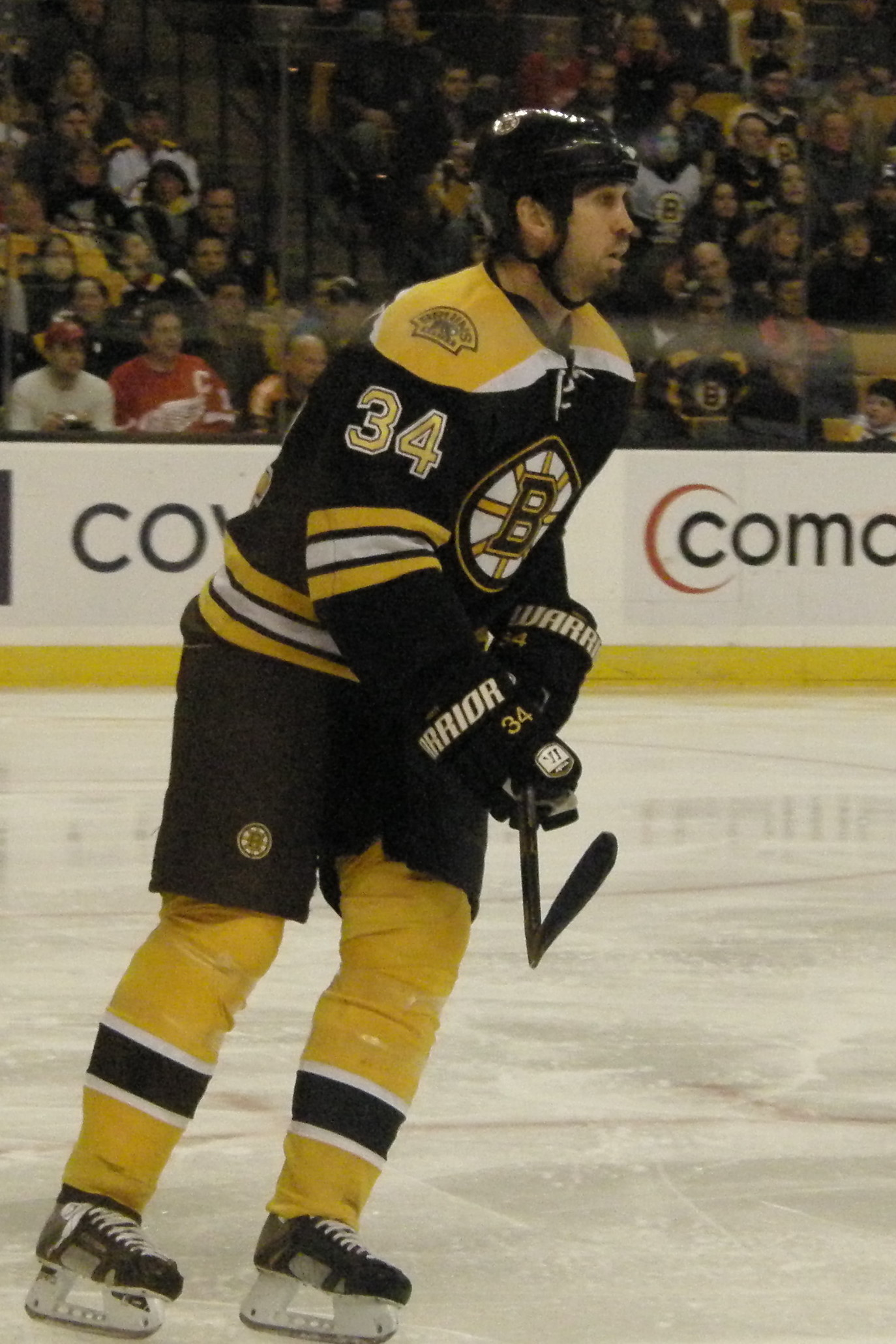
Hnidy as a member of the Boston Bruins.

Hnidy played junior hockey with the Swift Current Broncos and Prince Albert Raiders of the WHL. He was drafted in the 7th round (173rd overall) in the 1994 NHL entry draft by the Buffalo Sabres, although he played no games for the team. After turning professional in 1996, he played for minor league teams Saint John of the AHL, Grand Rapids of the IHL, Cincinnati and Adirondack of the AHL before being traded to the Ottawa Senators in 2000 where he established his NHL career. He has also played for the Anaheim Ducks, Atlanta Thrashers and Nashville Predators.

On January 2, 2008, the Boston Bruins acquired Hnidy and a 6th rounder in the 2008 NHL entry draft for Brandon Bochenski.

On July 3, 2009, Hnidy signed as an unrestricted free agent with the Minnesota Wild to a one-year contract.

As of the opening of the 2010-11 season, Hnidy remained an unsigned free agent. On February 23, 2011, it was announced Hnidy would be re-joining the Boston Bruins on a try-out basis. On February 26, 2011, Hnidy signed a contract with the Bruins for the remainder of the season, to serve as a depth defenseman. The Bruins won the Stanley Cup by defeating the Vancouver Canucks in a seven-game Stanley Cup Final. Though his name does not appear on the Stanley Cup, he was awarded a Stanley Cup ring and was included on the official team picture. He was given a day with the Stanley Cup on August 18, 2011, and officially retired on August 31, 2011.

== Post-retirement ==
Hnidy continues to give back to his home town of Neepawa with his support of the annual Shane Hnidy Golf Tournament, a significant fund raiser for the Beautiful Plains Community Foundation.

From 2011 to 2017, Hnidy was part of the Winnipeg Jets broadcast team on TSN Radio 1290 and the colourman with Dennis Beyak during Winnipeg Jets games on TSN Television. Hnidy was announced as a color commentator for the NHL's Vegas Golden Knights for their 2017–18 inaugural season on August 16, 2017. Hnidy has also lent his voice to select regular season and Stanley Cup Playoff games on TNT/TBS since 2022.

In April 2024, Canadian NHL broadcast rightsholder Rogers Communications announced that it had struck a deal to shift a portion of its rights – specifically the Monday night games played in Canada – from its own NHL on Sportsnet broadcast to Amazon Prime Video for the 2024–25 and 2025–26 regular seasons. In September, it was announced that Hnidy would alternate with Jody Shelley (both of whom have non-Prime NHL broadcast gigs) to provide colour analysis and interviews on Prime Monday Night Hockey, which launched with a game in Montreal on October 14, 2024.

== Career statistics ==
			Regular season					Playoffs
Season	Team	League	GP	G	A	Pts	PIM	GP	G	A	Pts	PIM
1991–92	Swift Current Broncos	WHL	56	1	3	4	11	4	0	0	0	0
1992–93	Swift Current Broncos	WHL	45	5	12	17	62	—	—	—	—	—
1992–93	Prince Albert Raiders	WHL	27	2	10	12	43	—	—	—	—	—
1993–94	Prince Albert Raiders	WHL	69	7	26	33	113	—	—	—	—	—
1994–95	Prince Albert Raiders	WHL	72	5	29	34	169	15	4	7	11	29
1995–96	Prince Albert Raiders	WHL	58	11	42	53	100	18	4	11	15	34
1996–97	Baton Rouge Kingfish	ECHL	21	3	10	13	50	—	—	—	—	—
1996–97	Saint John Flames	AHL	44	2	12	14	112	—	—	—	—	—
1997–98	Grand Rapids Griffins	IHL	77	6	12	18	210	3	0	2	2	23
1998–99	Adirondack Red Wings	AHL	68	9	20	29	121	3	0	1	1	0
1999–00	Cincinnati Mighty Ducks	AHL	68	9	19	28	153	—	—	—	—	—
2000–01	Grand Rapids Griffins	IHL	2	0	0	0	2	—	—	—	—	—
2000–01	Ottawa Senators	NHL	52	3	2	5	84	1	0	0	0	1
2001–02	Ottawa Senators	NHL	33	1	1	2	57	12	1	1	2	12
2002–03	Ottawa Senators	NHL	67	0	8	8	130	1	0	0	0	0
2003–04	Ottawa Senators	NHL	37	0	5	5	72	—	—	—	—	—
2003–04	Nashville Predators	NHL	9	0	2	2	10	5	0	0	0	6
2004–05	Florida Everblades	ECHL	19	1	4	5	56	17	0	4	4	6
2005–06	Atlanta Thrashers	NHL	66	0	3	3	33	—	—	—	—	—
2006–07	Atlanta Thrashers	NHL	72	5	7	12	63	4	1	0	1	0
2007–08	Anaheim Ducks	NHL	33	1	2	3	30	—	—	—	—	—
2007–08	Boston Bruins	NHL	43	1	4	5	41	7	1	1	2	9
2008–09	Boston Bruins	NHL	65	3	9	12	45	7	1	0	1	0
2009–10	Minnesota Wild	NHL	70	2	12	14	66	—	—	—	—	—
2010–11	Boston Bruins	NHL	3	0	0	0	2	3	0	0	0	7
NHL totals			550	16	55	71	633	40	4	2	6	34

== Transactions ==
- June 28, 1994 - drafted by Buffalo Sabres in the 7th round, 173rd overall
- August 6, 1998 - signed as free agent by Detroit Red Wings
- June 25, 2000 - traded by Red Wings to Ottawa Senators
- March 9, 2004 - traded by Senators to Nashville Predators for 2004 draft pick used to pick Peter Regin
- June 30, 2005 - traded by Predators to Atlanta Thrashers
- July 5, 2007 - signed as unrestricted free agent by Anaheim Ducks
- January 2, 2008 - traded by Ducks to Boston Bruins
- July 3, 2009 - signed as unrestricted free agent by Minnesota Wild
- August 10, 2010 - invited to training camp by Phoenix Coyotes
- February 23, 2011 - joined the Boston Bruins on a try out basis
- February 26, 2011 - signed as free agent by Boston Bruins
