= Ocean, New Jersey =

Ocean, New Jersey may refer to:

- Ocean City, New Jersey
- Ocean Township, Monmouth County, New Jersey
- Ocean Township, Ocean County, New Jersey
- Ocean County, New Jersey

It may also be confused with:

- Ocean Gate, New Jersey
- Ocean Grove, New Jersey
- Oceanport, New Jersey
