= NHL Productions =

Production arm of the National Hockey League

- Type: Subsidiary
- Founded: 2011
- Key people: David Proper (NHL chief media officer); Steve Mayer.(NHL president of events and content); Robert McGlarry (GM of local media)
- Owner: National Hockey League

NHL Productions is a film and television production company operated by the National Hockey League. First established in 2011, the division primarily produces documentaries and other television programming following the league.

In 2026, NHL Productions established a division devoted to regional broadcasting of NHL games, initially serving six teams that were formerly televised by FanDuel Sports Network and Victory+.

== History ==
NHL Productions was originally established in 2011 as an in-house production studio, primarily producing documentary miniseries and other programming following the league's teams and tentpole events for its broadcast partners, NHL Network, and other outlets (such as Road to the NHL Winter Classic, Behind The Glass, Stanley Pup, and Stanley Cup championship films).

In February 2025, NHL Productions partnered with Beyond Sports on a series of altcasts targeting youth audiences, using the league's player and puck tracking system to recreate a live game using 3D-animated characters. The NHL partnered with NESN, Sportsnet West, and other international broadcasters to produce full-length broadcasts in this format, and premiered a weekly series on NHL Network—Hockeyverse Matchup of the Week—which features highlights of a featured game in this format.

=== Regional broadcasting hub ===
In January 2026, Main Street Sports Group—owner of the FanDuel Sports Networks (FDSN, formerly Bally Sports)—experienced significant financial difficulties, and terminated its contracts with the nine Major League Baseball teams who were still under contract with the regional sports networks. During its initial bankruptcy as Diamond Sports Group, the networks had already terminated their contracts with four NHL teams—the Anaheim Ducks, Arizona Coyotes, Dallas Stars, and Florida Panthers, which moved to either broadcast television arrangements with Scripps Sports, or the Stars-led FAST service Victory+. In May 2025, the Tampa Bay Lightning also exercised an option to end its contract with FDSN, and signed with Scripps. As of the 2025–26 NHL season, only seven NHL teams were still under contract with FDSN: in April 2026, Main Street officially announced that FDSN would wind down following the conclusion of the current NHL and NBA seasons.

By virtue of their common ownership, Ilitch Holdings entered into an agreement with MLB Local Media—an in-house broadcasting unit established by MLB in the wake of volatility in the RSN industry—to produce and distribute regional broadcasts for both the Detroit Red Wings and MLB's Detroit Tigers via a part-time Detroit SportsNet channel on local television providers, and subscription streaming services hosted by MLB.tv. The Los Angeles Kings renewed with FanDuel Sports Network West after the Los Angeles Angels acquired Main Street's stake in the network, while the Nashville Predators signed with Scripps.

In March 2026, NHL commissioner Gary Bettman stated on a podcast that the league was not pursuing a plan to aggregate production and distribution of regional broadcasts (akin to MLB Local Media or the NBA's proposed "streaming hub"), citing preferences towards teams picking the most appropriate broadcast arrangements for their needs, and explaining that "in addition, we have developed the capability for our clubs, that any club that needs assistance in distributing games, we have an app, we have production capabilities, and we will assist. The goal with that is to make sure our fans always have access to the games, and the business model is going to have to evolve to take into account the changing environment."

On July 21, 2026, the NHL announced that it would launch a new "Centralized Production Group" within NHL Productions to produce regional broadcasts for the Columbus Blue Jackets, St. Louis Blues, Carolina Hurricanes, and Minnesota Wild. The new division is overseen by former president of MLB Network Rob McGlarry as GM of local media; McGlarry reports to the NHL's chief media officer David Proper and president of events and content Steve Mayer. Under the "production hub" model, teams would primarily cover production costs in exchange for access to league-provided production and technical resources, as well as flexibility and "strategic support" for different distribution and advertising models.

Each team provides its own producers, directors, and on-air talent. The league prioritized having aspects of the production be at a similar level to its national broadcast partners, including their camera setup, graphics and score bug (which were quickly developed by Gameday Creative in order to meet these goals while still allowing customization with localized elements for individual teams), and extensive use of the NHL Edge tracking system for statistics and analytics. The hub is initially being based out of MLB Network's headquarters in Secaucus, New Jersey; Mayer stated that the league is considering the construction of a "studio hub" to allow further expansion of the production hub to accommodate additional teams in the future, and the possibility of subcontracting its services to other entities.

Proper stated that "this new model strengthens the value of regional media rights by expanding the pool of potential distribution partners, reducing dependence on outside production providers, and allowing clubs to manage production investments more effectively. At the same time, it provides a foundation for the next generation of NHL production technologies and broadcast innovations."

== Current regional broadcast rights ==
In September 2026, the NHL initially announced that the Blue Jackets, Blues, Hurricanes, and Wild's regional games would be streamed by Amazon Prime Video, with each team offering a subscription service housed within the platform. These services are separate from the main Prime Video service and do not require an Amazon Prime subscription to purchase. With the collapse of Victory+, it was concurrently announced that the Anaheim Ducks and Dallas Stars would also join the NHL Productions hub; unlike the remaining four teams, their games are available to Prime subscribers without an additional subscription.

The NHL reached agreements to carry Blue Jackets, Blues, Hurricanes, and Wild games via part-time channels on selected television providers, particularly Charter and FuboTV. In early-October 2026, the Wild's chief revenue officer Mitch Helgerson told The Athletic that the NHL was at an impasse with Comcast Xfinity (the predominant cable provider in the team's market) over packaging for the part-time channel, but that negotiations with DirecTV were "a different conversation" and making "encouraging" progress.

The Hurricanes, Stars, and Wild announced plans to carry packages of selected games on broadcast television. The Ducks are maintaining the over-the-air broadcasting deal they had with Fox Television Stations under Victory+, with all regional games airing in simulcast on KCOP-TV or KTTV.

Team	Distributor/service	Over-the-air affiliates
Anaheim Ducks	Prime Video	KCOP-TV (all regional games) KTTV (selected games)
Dallas Stars	Prime Video	17 games
Columbus Blue Jackets	Blue Jackets Hockey Network	
St. Louis Blues	Blue Note+	
Carolina Hurricanes	Hurricanes Hockey Network	WRAL-TV and WRAZ (10 games)
Minnesota Wild	Wild+	KSTC-TV and KSTP-TV (10 games)

== See also ==
- List of current National Hockey League broadcasters
- NFL Films
- NBA Entertainment
