= NHL.TV =

Ice hockey television package

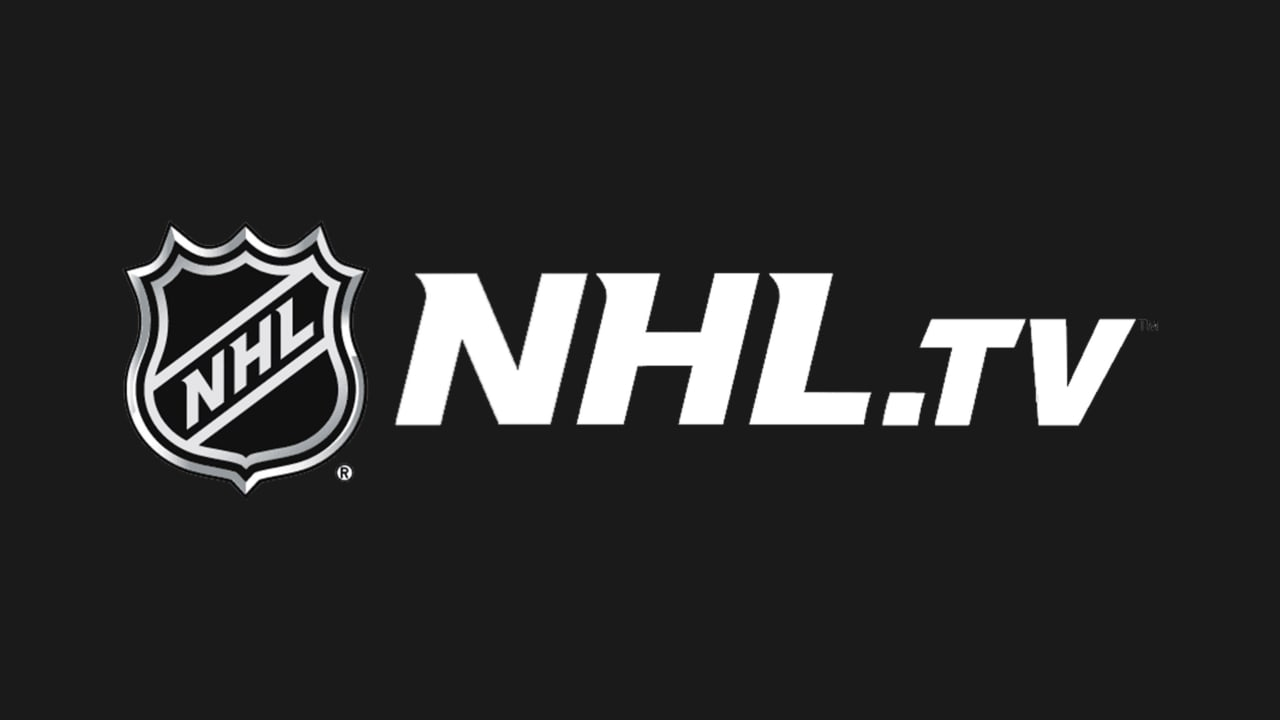
- Country: United States
- Broadcast area: Selected countries

Programming
- Picture format: 2140p (UHD-TV)

Ownership
- Owner: National Hockey League (50%); DAZN (50%)
- Sister channels: NHL Centre Ice

NHL.TV is an international sport cable and satellite streaming package that streams National Hockey League (NHL) games in selected countries. The service is most notably not available where the NHL operates in Canada and the United States due to streaming agreements with Sportsnet since 2014 and ESPN since 2021, respectively. The league initially launched its streaming service as NHL GameCenter Live in 2008, before renaming it NHL.TV in 2016. Since 2025, the service has been a joint venture between the league and DAZN.

== History ==
The league initially launched its streaming service as NHL GameCenter Live in 2008. For users in Canada and the United States, as well as in other countries with "in-market" NHL broadcasters, it only allowed the live streaming of out-of-market live games.

In the 2013–14 NHL season, Rogers Sports & Media acquired the exclusive national rights to the NHL in Canada. As part of the agreement, Rogers assumed distribution and marketing of the NHL's digital services in Canada; as a result, and service was rebranded as "Rogers NHL GameCentre Live" as a result. The service became billed by Rogers through its account system, and the service also began to carry national NHL on Sportsnet and Hockey Night in Canada games. For the first season, in-market games were also available for teams whose regional games were carried by Sportsnet; beginning in the 2015–16 season, it began to allow in-market streaming for TSN-produced regional games for authenticated subscribers of TSN. It also offered "GamePlus", a component featuring alternate camera angles, such as net cams, point-of-view cams, and skycams.

On August 4, 2015, the NHL announced a six-year deal with MLB Advanced Media (MLBAM), in which the company took over the operations of the NHL's digital properties, beginning in January 2016. Outside of Canada, MLBAM then distributed GameCenter Live under the new name NHL.TV.

For the 2018–19 season, Rogers discontinued all free trials and the additional GamePlus features. For the 2019–20 season, the brand name for the service was shortened to NHL Live.

NHL.TV was discontinued in the United States under the NHL's new media rights beginning in the 2021–22 season; the digital out-of-market package was acquired by ESPN, airing on ESPN+ under the "NHL Power Play on ESPN+" banner. The same year, NHL Live in Canada became available as part of the premium tier of Sportsnet's DTC service Sportsnet Now (now Sportsnet+). In the 2022–23 season, the separate NHL Live service was discontinued, with the package now exclusive to Sportsnet+. Meanwhile, the international service was taken over by Sportradar. as an extension of its existing agreement to serve as the league's official betting data and integrity provider.

On July 30, 2025, the NHL announced a global digital rights deal with DAZN. Under the agreement, NHL.TV moved to DAZN as part of or as an add-on subscription in around 200 countries, replacing the league's deal with Sportradar.
