= History of the Ottawa Senators (since 1992) =

Founded and established by Ottawa's real estate developer Bruce Firestone, the Ottawa Senators professional ice hockey team is the second National Hockey League (NHL) franchise to have the Ottawa Senators name. The original Ottawa Senators, founded in 1883, had a famed history, winning 11 Stanley Cups and was a founding member of the NHL from 1917 until 1934. On December 6, 1990, after a two-year public campaign by Firestone to return the NHL to Ottawa, the NHL awarded a new franchise for an expansion fee of US$50 million. The team began play in the 1992–93 season.

On the ice, the club finished last in the league in its first four seasons. Changes in hockey management led to a steady improvement of the team's play, resulting in the team finally qualifying for the Stanley Cup playoffs in 1997. The team has since qualified for the playoffs in 16 seasons, most recently in 2017. Since 2017, the team has struggled to be successful on the ice and has not qualified for the playoffs. The team won the Presidents' Trophy in 2002–03, has played in three Eastern Conference finals, and made it to the Stanley Cup Final in 2007.

The team has had three changes of ownership. The team changed hands from Firestone's Terrace Investments to Canadian businessman Rod Bryden in 1993 due to the arena development process and difficulties in financing. It was subsequently sold to Canadian pharmaceuticals businessman Eugene Melnyk after the team filed for bankruptcy in 2003. Melnyk died in 2022, eventually leading to the sale of the franchise by his estate to Canadian businessman Michael Andlauer for US$950 million in September 2023. Melnyk's daughters retained 10%.

== The "Bring back the Senators" campaign ==
At the weekly Terrace Investments Ltd. management meeting on December 4, 1987, manager Duncan MacDonald tabled the initial idea of the NHL returning to Ottawa after learning in the Ottawa Citizen about the league's expansion plans for three new franchises in the 1990s. Real estate developer Bruce Firestone privately entertained the idea for months. He decided to launch a bid for the Ottawa franchise through his development firm Terrace Investments. Firestone first told his fellow Terrace executives, Cyril Leeder, and Randy Sexton, after a game of shinny hockey in March 1988. Both were surprised; Leeder thought the idea was "ridiculous". They also added other key Ottawa stakeholders to the conversation, Jeff Kyle and Mark Bonneau. Leeder said "Myself, Bruce and Randy get all the attention. Jeff Kyle and Mark Bonneau were the two guys that did a lot of heavy lifting. I have no hesitation in saying they had a significant role in bringing the team to Ottawa and helping us to get it established."

A major obstacle was that while Firestone believed that Ottawa was ready to once again support a franchise, Terrace did not have enough assets to finance a team, let alone build an arena. Firestone's belief was that they could do both as part of a development project. Their plan was to build a mini-city (named West Terrace) of 9,000 around a CA$100 million arena and hotel development on approximately 500 acres (2.0 km^{2}). Getting an NHL club for the arena would drive up the price of the surrounding lands and Terrace's net worth would jump from CA$100 million to CA$400 million by 1997. The strategy was straightforward: "Buy the site, win the franchise, build the building." In 1989, Terrace found what seemed to be a suitable site west of Ottawa, 600 acres (2.4 km^{2}) of farmland, located on both sides of the 417 Highway west of Terry Fox Drive in the then City of Kanata, that had been a prospective site for the Central Canada Exhibition.

Design using Ottawa Senators text and depiction of clock tower

On June 22, 1989, Terrace publicly announced their intentions to acquire an NHL franchise and revive the Senators name. The name choice provoked threats of legal action, though Firestone obtained permission from original-era / 1950s era Senators club owner Tommy Gorman's descendants to use the old Senators name and settled with the Ottawa Jr. Senators' owners.

To kick off the "Bring Back the Senators" campaign, Terrace held a press conference on September 7, 1989, with special guests Frank Finnigan, representing the old Senators' players, and Joe Gorman, representing the Gorman family. Finnigan, the last surviving member of the Senators' last Stanley Cup championship (in 1927), was presented with a new number 8 jersey and the promise to have him drop the first puck at the first game if they emerged victorious. Terrace unveiled drawings of the CA$55 million, 22,500-seat arena, then named the Palladium, designed by Rossetti Architects, architects of The Palace of Auburn Hills arena. Also unveiled was a logo for the team using a stylized Peace Tower and Canadian flag, designed by David O'Malley of Ottawa. The theme song for the franchise drive was Tom Petty's "I Won't Back Down."

Jim Durrell, the mayor of Ottawa at the time, but later part of the Senators' front office, said, "It's not that the area isn't a big enough market to support a professional hockey team, it's just that we're not going to get it." National Hockey League Players' Association (NHLPA) head Alan Eagleson was quoted as saying, "Local fans are being led through the petunia patch if Bruce Firestone thinks he can land an NHL expansion franchise for Ottawa this century, well into the next or ever." Despite the naysayers, 11,000 fans sent in CA$25 non-refundable pledges toward season tickets by November 1990.

Having already awarded a franchise to the San Francisco Bay Area that would become the San Jose Sharks, in December 1990 the NHL held a meeting in Palm Beach, Florida, to consider the remaining expansion applications. A well-financed bid from Tim Hortons founder Ron Joyce for Hamilton, Ontario, where an NHL-size arena (Copps Coliseum) was already in place, was considered a front-runner, and it was widely assumed the NHL would not add more than one franchise in Canada. Beneficial factors included that Ottawa was Canada's capital, had several television stations, had a reasonably large metropolitan population, and had a history of ice hockey.

The apparent decisive factor was that Firestone, along with the Tampa Bay group, was willing to pay the US$50 million franchise fee without reservations, unlike the other proponents. The size of the expansion fee, which is approximately $123 million in 2026 dollars, had come as a shock to many observers and would-be owners. In nominal terms, this was more than eight times the US$6 million that owners paid for expansion franchises in the 1970s, which was less than a quarter the NHL's proposed franchise fee even when adjusted for inflation. Moreover, it was also considerably more than the purchase price of the existing Minnesota North Stars, which had then recently sold for US$31.5 million.

On December 6, 1990, John Ziegler, who was the NHL President, announced that the Terrace group was approved to purchase one of the two franchises (the other being the Tampa Bay Lightning) to start play in the 1992–93 season.

== The Palladium project ==
Since the location for the new arena was on land designated for agriculture, the arena and development needed approval by the Government of Ontario. The then-new Ontario New Democratic Party government of Bob Rae was openly hostile to the conversion of farmland and refused to offer any assistance to the project. As the rezoning hearings dragged on, Firestone was offered US$20 million to relocate to Anaheim, which had an arena, but no team. Firestone turned it down, claiming, "I didn't bring back the Ottawa Senators to play in Anaheim."

Eventually, the rezoning was approved with conditions. The Palladium's size was reduced to 18,500, and Terrace had to pay for a necessary highway interchange. Terrace had to suspend its plans for the rest of the "West Terrace" development, which limited the site's value. Only the lands to the south of the 417 were allowed to be developed, and the lands on the north side of the 417 were to remain farmland. According to Firestone, Terrace's investment lost CA$80 million in value to secure the zoning. Eventually, the strain to complete the payment on the franchise to the NHL and to build the arena led to Firestone's resignation on August 17, 1993, after Terrace missed mortgage and development payments, and the team turned to Rod Bryden, who would lead the franchise until the bankruptcy in 2003.

The government-imposed restrictions made financing of the arena project difficult to secure. Terrace had four financing deals fail. As it became clear that the Senators could not finance a needed highway interchange without government backing, the Government of Ontario was persuaded successfully to provide a CA$27 million loan for the highway interchange construction. In the end, the firm of Ogden Entertainment, a New York City facilities management firm, backed the project with a US$20 million loan in exchange for a 30-year contract to manage the facility. In addition, American banks loaned US$110 million, the federal government gave the Senators CA$6 million, CA$10 million from Terrace and CA$15 million from a Canadian pension fund.

The new arena would not be ready for the 1992–93 season. As planned, the team would play its first seasons at the Ottawa Civic Centre arena. The Civic Centre was expanded to seat about 10,000 fans, luxury boxes were built, a new press box and new player benches were installed.

Once construction actually started the project went smoothly, and the Palladium was completed on budget within 18 months. The Senators played the first game at the Palladium on January 17, 1996. The event was much more subdued than their franchise's first game. The Cup banners were raised, but the winches jammed, blocking the view of many fans. There were no entertainment big names, and only Firestone and Bryden participated in the ceremonial face-off. The pre-game entertainment included a 3D laser light show and the raising of a banner for the late Brian Smith.

One month after opening, Corel Corporation bought the naming rights in a ten-year deal and the arena was renamed the Corel Centre. In 2006, the naming rights were then purchased by Scotiabank in a 25-year deal and the arena was re-branded Scotiabank Place. Seven years later, Scotiabank sold the naming rights to Canadian Tire Corporation in a deal which saw the facility become the Canadian Tire Centre, which is its current name.

== 1992–1995: Expansion club struggles ==
The team would name Mel Bridgman as their first general manager (GM) in 1991 after being turned down by Scotty Bowman and John Muckler. The decision was criticized by the press due to Bridgman's lack of GM experience. In the coaching department, the club would pick Rick Bowness, formerly the Boston Bruins' head coach, as their first head coach, assisted by Alain Vigneault, E. J. McGuire and Chico Resch. John Ferguson, Sr., would be named director of player personnel.

The expansion draft day on June 18, 1992, was memorable. The team's laptop computer failed and the club was unprepared with a backup plan, picking ineligible players twice. The draft rules allowed established teams to protect not only their best players, but young prospects as well. The players the Senators did select were "journeymen NHLers or players who had good years in minor leagues but no longer were considered prospects." While side-deals during the Draft were not allowed, the team would select players in concert with the other teams and in return, other teams gave the Senators Neil Brady, Jody Hull, Brad Marsh and Steve Weeks during the summer, all who would ultimately make the team. In the entry draft, the Senators would name Alexei Yashin their first-ever pick, though he would not join the team until 1993.

=== 1992–93: First season ===
The new Senators were placed in the Adams Division of the Wales Conference, and played their first game on October 8, 1992, at the Ottawa Civic Centre against the Montreal Canadiens. There was much pre-game spectacle — the skating of Brian Orser, the raising of banners commemorating the original Senators' eight Stanley Cup wins, retirement of Frank Finnigan's jersey number and the singing of the anthem by Ottawa native Alanis Morissette.

Ziegler had been ousted as NHL President before the Senators had played a game, so his successor Gil Stein took part in the opening ceremonies, presenting Bruce Firestone with a "certificate of reinstatement" to commemorate Ottawa's return to the NHL after 58 years, Stein calling it the "rebirth of a grand old franchise". The ceremonial face-off between Laurie Boschman and Denis Savard was done by Frank Finnigan, Jr., (his father having died on December 25, 1991), Firestone, Stein and original Senator Ray Kinsella. The Senators would play in the 10,000 seat Civic Centre until January 1996.

The Senators would defeat the eventual Stanley Cup champion Canadiens 5–3 that night, but it would turn out to be their only highlight of the season for the Senators. The club would tie with the San Jose Sharks for the worst record in the league that year, winning just ten games with 70 losses and four ties (24 points) in the 1992–93 season. The Senators tied the NHL record for fewest road wins for their record that season, with one. Their points total for the season was one point better than the NHL record for fewest points in a season ever. The Senators had aimed low. Firestone had set beating the old record the Senators' goal for the season, as the team planned to finish low in the standings for its first few years in order to receive high draft picks.

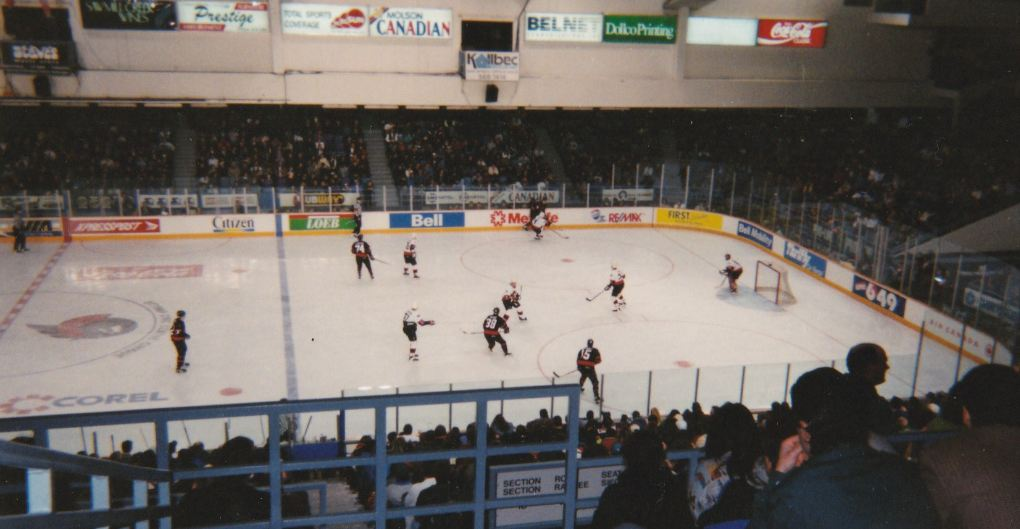
The Senators played their home games at the Ottawa Civic Centre from 1992 to 1996.

==== Daigle Cup ====
Among the disappointments during the early years of the resurrected Senators was Alexandre Daigle, the number one overall pick in the 1993 NHL entry draft. During the 1992–93 season, it had become clear that Daigle would be the number one pick. The Quebec Nordiques publicly announced that they would trade several players for him, including the rights to Peter Forsberg, as they wished to build a new arena and needed a marquee francophone player. As the season progressed, both the Senators and the San Jose Sharks were neck-and-neck in last place, and at that time, NHL rules meant the worst team would receive the first overall pick. This "competition" was variously dubbed the "Daigle Cup" and the "Yelnats Puc" ("Stanley Cup" spelled backwards).

Near the end of the season, the Senators would call other teams to ask for their opponent's best players to be playing them in upcoming matches, making plans to field a weaker squad if their opponent did so also. The club made no trades to improve its position, not wanting to lose the number one pick. After the season, Bruce Firestone would make comments to the press about how the team deliberately lost games, expecting that comments would be "off the record". Instead, his comments were reported, the NHL investigated, and the team was fined US$100,000 (equivalent to $222,875 in 2025) for his comments. The NHL changed its rules as of the 1995 Draft so that a lottery would be held for the top draft picks.

As the 1993 NHL Entry Draft neared, the Senators held talks with Daigle and Quebec over a possible trade. The Senators were prepared to select Chris Pronger instead, arguably a better choice at the time, according to the Senators' scouting staff. As the Palladium financing was faltering, Bryden saw that the club needed Daigle for the financing to come through. Finally, the Senators refused to trade with Quebec, selected Daigle first overall and signed him to a US$12.25 million contract (including marketing rights), the largest rookie salary in league history. The size of the contract led the NHL to impose a cap on rookie contracts a few years later. The club would promote Daigle over Alexei Yashin, nominating Daigle for rookie of the year over Yashin. His play did not justify full-time status and in 1995, coaches Rick Bowness and Alain Vigneault demoted Daigle to part-time status. The move led to Bowness and Vigneault being fired. In the end, Daigle did not come close to the career the Senators hoped for. After scoring only 74 goals in just over four seasons, he was traded to the Philadelphia Flyers, and is widely regarded as one of the biggest draft busts in sports history. Over his career, Daigle played ten seasons in the NHL and several in European leagues.

=== 1993–1995 ===
After the 1992–93 season, Bridgman was fired and replaced by Senators Vice-president Randy Sexton. At the league office, Stein had already been replaced as chief executive by the NHL's first Commissioner, Gary Bettman. Prior to the 1993–94 season, Bettman oversaw the renaming of the conferences and divisions, making the Senators members of the Eastern Conference's Northeast Division. On August 17, 1993, Firestone sold his remaining shares in the Senators to Bryden and resigned as governor of the team.

For the 1993–94 season, the club added prospects Daigle and Yashin. Yashin would have an outstanding rookie season and was a finalist for the Calder Memorial Trophy. Yashin led the team in points with 30 goals and 79 points, while Daigle had 51 points. The Senators would make some progress, improving their record to 14 wins and 37 points, but would again finish last in the league. Despite the team finishing last overall, the Senators did not receive the first overall pick in 1994, under the rules established when Anaheim and Florida were admitted to the league. These stipulated that those teams would be guaranteed the top two picks in the 1994 entry draft, no matter how well they did in the 1993–94 season. The Senators would select Radek Bonk with their pick, third overall, in the draft.

During this period, the club may have been more focused on building the Palladium, for which construction began in July 1994. In the lockout-shortened 1994–95 season, Yashin and Daigle led the club in points again, although their point totals were sharply reduced, as the team played 48 games. The 1994–95 Senators season total declined also from the previous season, finishing with nine wins and 23 points, and finished last in the league again.

== 1996–2004: Jacques Martin era ==
=== Ottawa's turnaround ===
One month before the Senators were to open the new Palladium, after three-straight last place finishes, and poor attendance at the Civic Centre, the Senators organization was in turmoil. Star player Alexei Yashin, angered that management favoured Daigle over him despite posting higher numbers, was a contract hold-out. First-round draft choice Bryan Berard, who had left the Senators training camp unsigned to a contract, publicly stated that he would never report to the Senators. After head coach Rick Bowness demoted Daigle to the fourth line, general manager Randy Sexton fired Bowness and assistant coach Alain Vigneault on November 20, 1995. He replaced the coaches with Prince Edward Island Senators coach Dave Allison and gave the assistant coaching job to former Hartford Whalers head coach Pierre McGuire, who was working at the time as a scout for the Senators.

The situation was a large concern for the Senators ownership and especially for Ogden, which had much invested in the soon-to-open Palladium and which did not want to open the Palladium to poor attendance. Ogden brought in Roy Mlakar to assist in sorting out the turmoil; he would eventually become team president and CEO.

The turnaround process started with the firing of Sexton on December 11, 1995, and the hiring of the Mighty Ducks of Anaheim assistant general manager Pierre Gauthier as GM, Ottawa's first with previous NHL executive experience. Before the end of January, Gauthier signed Yashin to a three-year contract, traded Berard to the New York Islanders for Wade Redden, and hired Jacques Martin as head coach.

In the midst of the upheaval, the new Palladium opened. The Senators, still coached by Allison, lost their opening game in the arena 3–0 to Montreal on January 17, 1996. The club would lose its first four games at the Palladium, winning none for Allison, who was later fired on January 24 after the team lost 22 of 25 games.

While Ottawa finished last in the league for the fourth year in a row, the 1995–96 season ended with renewed optimism, partly from the debut of new star Daniel Alfredsson, who won the Calder Memorial Trophy (the NHL rookie of the year award), the first Senator to do so. Alfredsson, selected 133rd overall in 1994, was also selected to play in the 1996 NHL All-Star Game. The Senators chose defenceman Chris Phillips first-overall in the 1996 NHL entry draft, who would be a mainstay on the Senators blueline through the 2014–15 season.

The 1996–97 season would see the Senators qualify for the Stanley Cup playoffs for the first time, in dramatic fashion. They clinched the seventh seed on the last game of the regular season thanks to a late goal from Steve Duchesne against the Buffalo Sabres' Dominik Hasek, giving the Senators a 1–0 win and the first playoff appearance for an Ottawa-based team in 67 years. The Senators then faced Buffalo in the first round of the playoffs and were eliminated in the full seven games. Despite holding a lead in game seven, Alexei Yashin put the puck in his own net, allowing Buffalo to tie the game and eventually win the game and the series on a goal by Derek Plante in overtime.

The next season, 1997–98, saw the Senators improve further. They improved their regular season record, finishing with their first winning record in franchise history (one game over .500). In the first play-off round, they upset the top-seeded and the heavily favoured New Jersey Devils in six games to win their first playoff series. The Senators next faced the eventual Eastern Conference champion Washington Capitals and lost in five games. Prior to the season, Senators' GM Gauthier imposed a rule disallowing 'vanity numbers' on jerseys, that is, player's jerseys having a number higher than the goaltender. His reasoning was that "To me it just seems to single people out when you wear the high number, We're a team." Daigle went from 91 to 9, Bonk from 76 to 14, Neckar went from 94 to 24, Bicanek from 44 to 23, and Lambert from 42 to 28.

After the season, Rick Dudley would become general manager after Pierre Gauthier returned to Anaheim to become the Ducks' general manager. Dudley would be the Ottawa GM for only a year, leaving to join Tampa Bay, and was replaced by Marshall Johnston.

=== Emergence as playoff contenders ===
In 1998–99, the Senators jumped from 14th in the previous season to third, with 103 points—the first 100-point season in club history. The team, however, took an embarrassing pratfall in the playoffs, being swept by Buffalo after scoring just three goals in the entire series.

Ottawa was locked in a contract dispute with then-captain Alexei Yashin during the 1999–2000 season. Yashin held out for the entire season, hoping either to play elsewhere or claim his contract was for 1999–2000, not a year of service. The team responded by suspending him for the entire season and granting the captaincy to Daniel Alfredsson. An NHL arbitrator rejected Yashin's request to make him a free agent, instead ruling that he owed the Senators one more season if he ever returned to the NHL. The Senators even took legal action to recover damages suffered as a result of the dispute.

Despite the distraction, the Senators' regular season was successful as they finished with 93 points to qualify for the playoffs in sixth place in the Eastern Conference. Like the previous year, they had a quick playoff exit, losing in six games in the first round to the Toronto Maple Leafs.

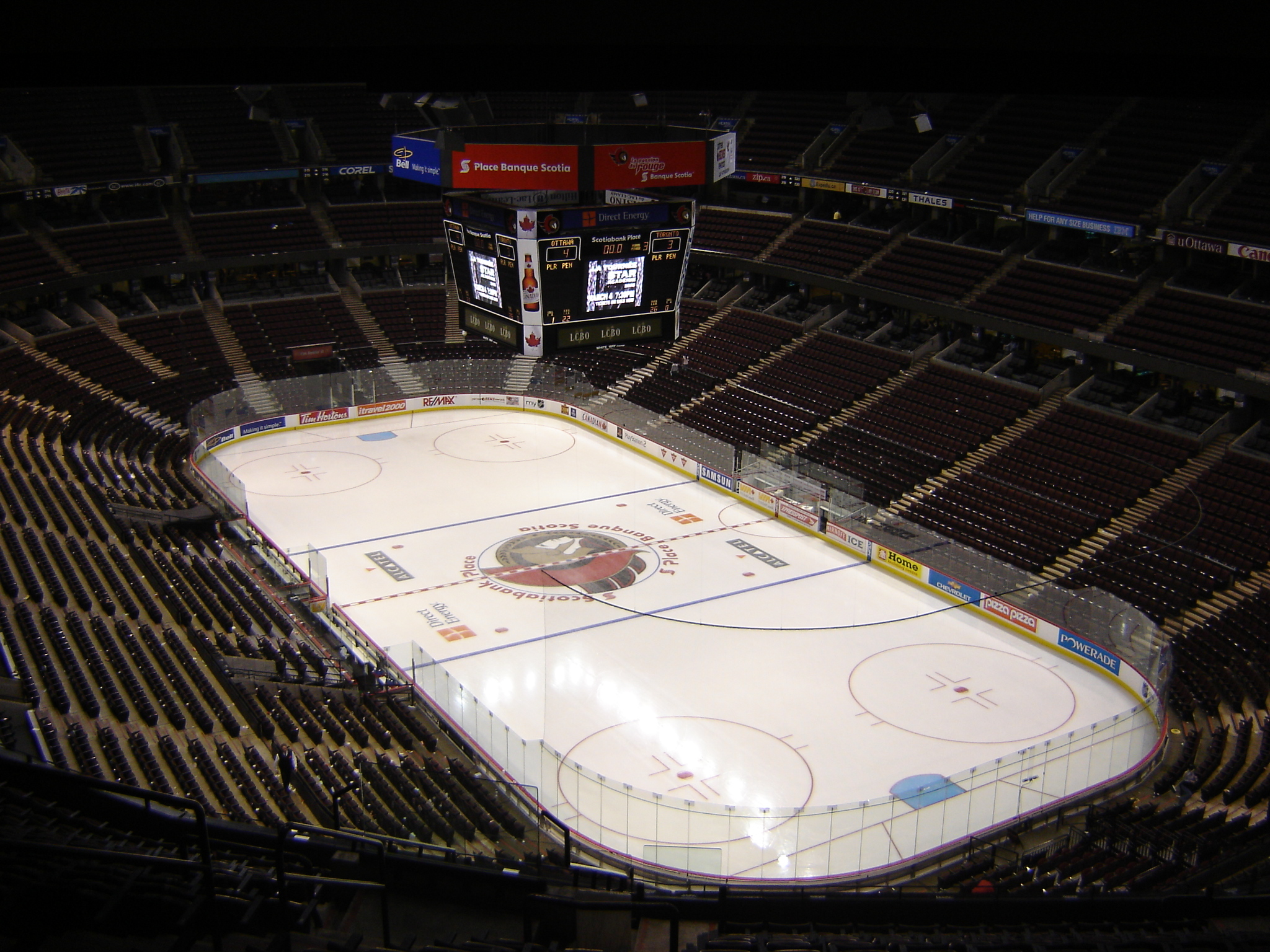
The Senators' arena, Scotiabank Place, its name following the signing with Scotiabank for a 25-year, CA$25 million contract in January 2006. The team terminated the agreement seven years later and sold the naming rights to Canadian Tire Corporation, which gave the facility its present name.

Yashin returned for the 2000–01 season, though no longer the captain of the team. Despite being booed at home and in most arenas, being cursed as "Alexei Cashin" or "Cashin Yashin" by the fans, he played well for the Senators. The Senators had another successful season, finishing with 109 points, winning the Division and placing second in the East. For the third-straight season, however, the Senators could not win a playoff round, losing again to Toronto in the first round, this time in a 4–0 sweep. After the season, on the day of the 2001 NHL entry draft, Yashin would be dealt to the New York Islanders in exchange for Zdeno Chara, Bill Muckalt and the Islanders' first-round draft pick (second overall), which the Senators used to select Jason Spezza. Yashin would sign a US$87.5 million ten-year contract with the Islanders.

In 2001–02, the Senators regular season points total dropped to 94 points, third in the Division, but the team did qualify for the playoffs. Jacques Martin stepped aside as head coach for the final two games to allow assistant coach Roger Neilson to record 1,000 games as head coach in the NHL. In the first round, they upset the Philadelphia Flyers in five games, limiting the Flyers' high-powered offence to just two goals for the franchise's second playoff series win. This led to a second round series with Toronto, the third-straight year the Senators had met the Maple Leafs in the "Battle of Ontario." The Maple Leafs won the series in a tense seven-game affair, despite the Senators leading the series 3–2 after five games.

After the disappointing end to the season, there was speculation that front-office changes were coming. In the end, GM Marshall Johnston retired, but Martin and Mlakar were re-signed. John Muckler was hired on June 12, 2002, the Senators' sixth GM, and the first with previous experience as a general manager (with Buffalo).

In 2002–03, off-ice problems dominated the headlines. The Senators filed for bankruptcy in January 2003, but continued regular season play after getting some emergency financing from the NHL. Despite the off-ice problems, Ottawa won the Presidents' Trophy, finishing with a franchise-record 113 points, making them the first Canadian team to win it since the Calgary Flames in 1989. This was also the highest finish by an Ottawa team in 77 years (since the original Senators finished first overall in 1926). In the 2003 playoffs, they defeated Yashin and his New York Islanders and the Philadelphia Flyers before coming within one game of making it into the Final, falling to the eventual Stanley Cup champions, the New Jersey Devils.

=== Bankruptcy and purchase by Eugene Melnyk ===
The debt payments weighed heavily on the Senators. For several years, Bryden tried to reschedule the debt on the arena. There were various attempts at filing tax losses to write off the debt, all rejected by the Government of Canada. In 2002, Ogden went bankrupt. It had re-invented itself as Covanta Energy and failed not long after the Enron scandal broke out. This led to the Senators filing for bankruptcy on January 9, 2003, when it could not arrange financing to pay all it owed to Covanta, becoming due because of Covanta's bankruptcy.

On August 26, 2003, the team and arena was purchased by Biovail's chief executive officer (CEO) and Toronto St. Michael's Majors owner Eugene Melnyk, who had shown interest for several years in the team. The limited partnership between Terrace and the limited partners was dissolved and Covanta's creditors received the proceeds of the sale towards the money it was owed for the NHL franchise fee and the Palladium.

=== Failure in playoffs and firing of Jacques Martin ===
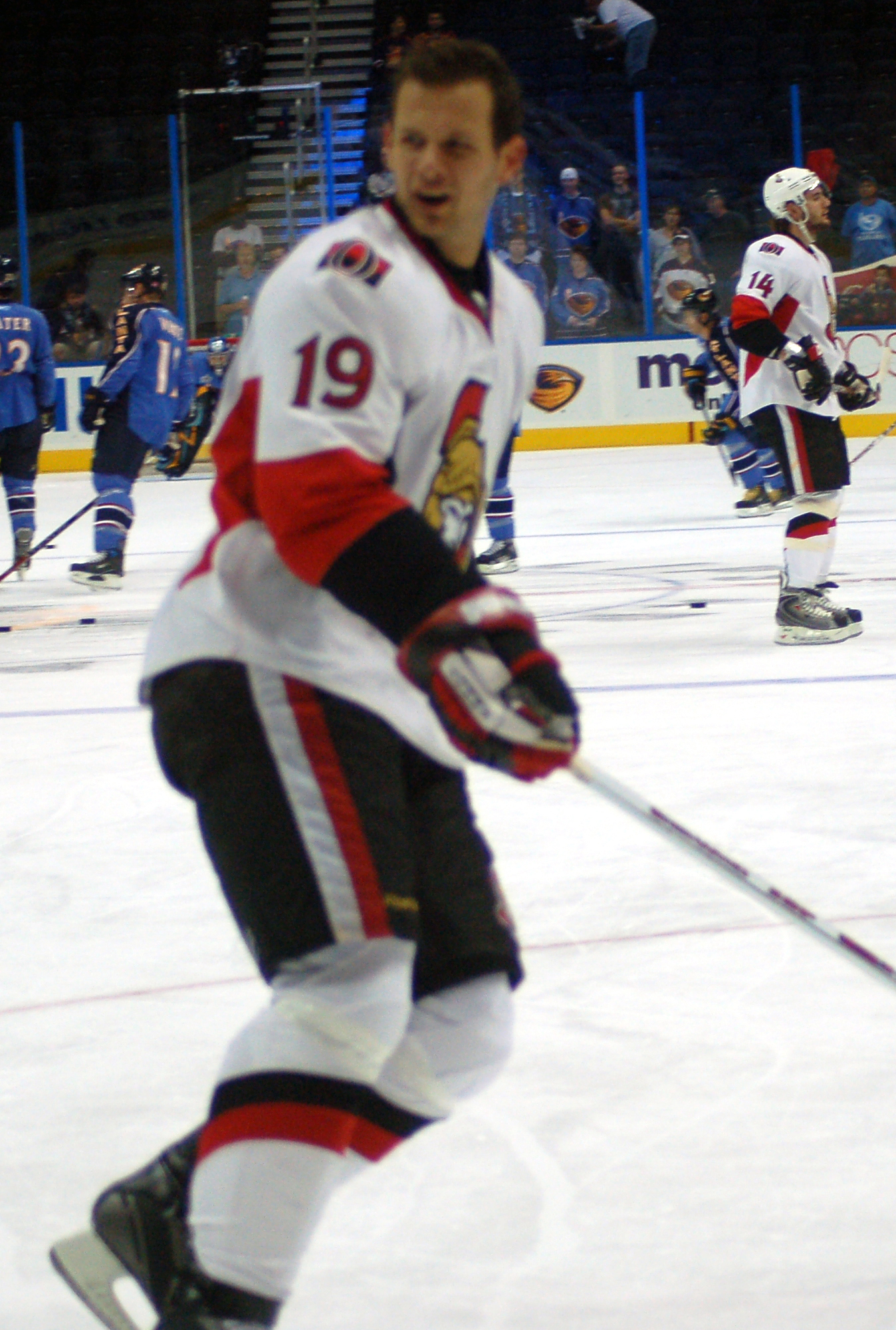
Jason Spezza was picked with the draft choice received for Alexei Yashin.

After the sale, the team entered the 2003–04 season with high expectations. Martin would guide the team to another good regular season, finishing with 102 points. This was good for only third in the tightly contested Northeast Division, as Boston would have 104 and Toronto 103.

The seedings meant that the Senators would play the Maple Leafs in the playoffs for a fourth time, in the first round of the 2004 playoffs. By now, Ottawa had developed a strong rivalry with their Ontario rivals, and there was a great deal of pressure on the team to finally defeat the Leafs. Despite missing their captain Mats Sundin and other veterans, the Maple Leafs would win the series on the back of goaltender Ed Belfour, who had two shutouts in the series, defeating the Senators in seven games. In game seven, Senators goaltender Patrick Lalime would surrender three goals before the first period was done and would be replaced by backup Martin Prusek. The Senators were not able to come back from the 3–0 deficit, losing 4–1. It was Lalime's last appearance in a Senators' uniform, and Martin's last game as coach—two days after the loss, Martin was fired. and Lalime was later traded to the St. Louis Blues for a fourth-round pick in the 2005 NHL Draft.

After losing eight of 12 playoff series, including all four series in five years against Toronto, team management felt that a new coach was required for playoff success. Muckler even suggested that the new coach would have "to fix the dressing room", implying the team was not responding to Martin. On June 8, 2004, Bryan Murray became the team's fifth head coach, leaving the Mighty Ducks of Anaheim, where he had been general manager. He would not actually coach until 2005 due to the 2004–05 NHL lockout. Top centre Radek Bonk was also moved, to the Los Angeles Kings for a third-round pick in the 2004 draft.

== 2004–2017: Bryan Murray era ==
=== 2004–06: High expectations unfulfilled ===
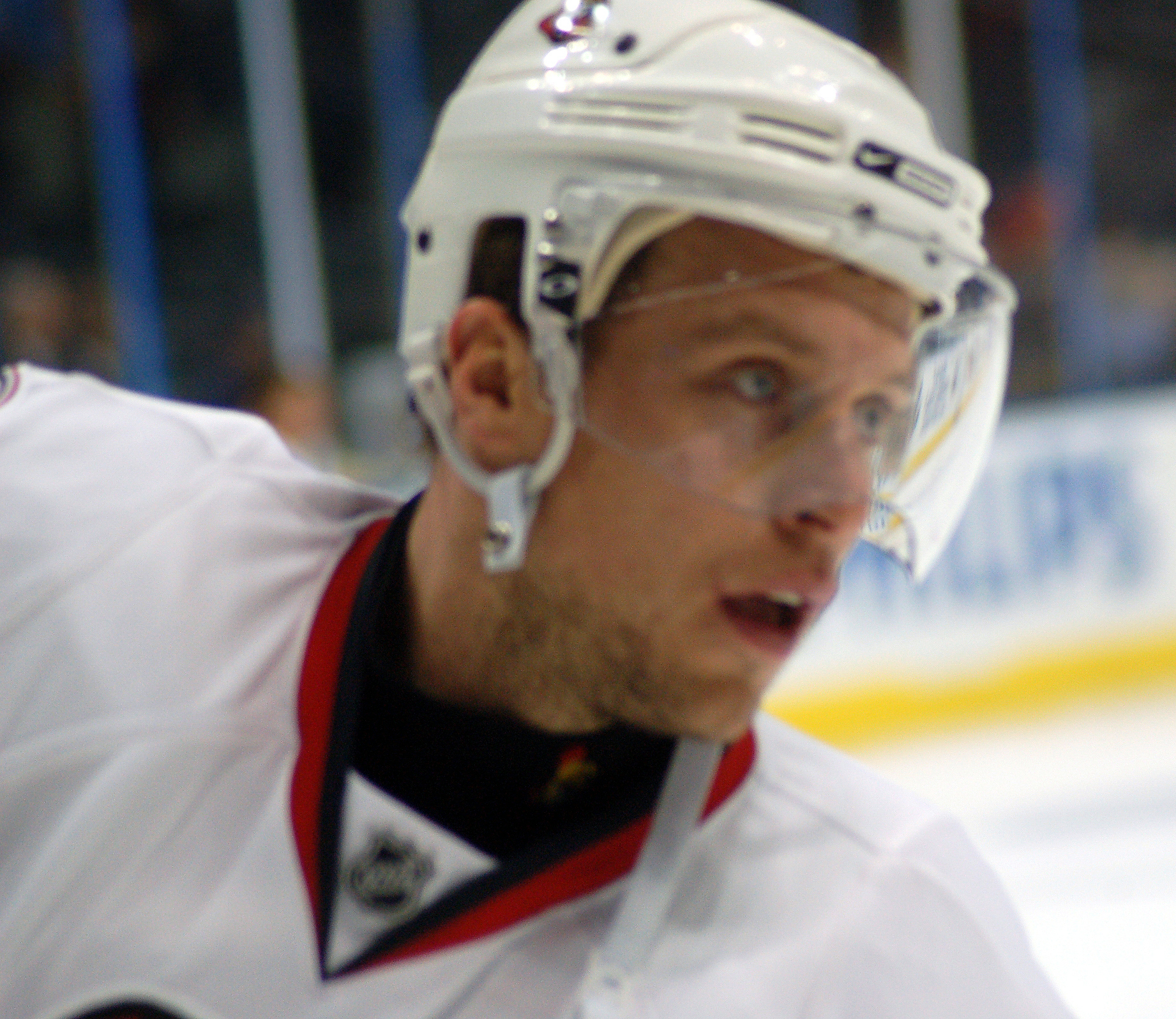
Forward Dany Heatley netted two consecutive 50-goal seasons in 2005–06 and the following year.

To replace Lalime, the team picked up free agent goaltender Dominik Hasek. Due to the lockout, the Senators did not play in 2004–05, while several players played in Europe or in the American Hockey League. Following the lockout, the media predicted the Senators to be Stanley Cup contenders, as they had a strong core back after the lockout, played in an up-tempo style fitting the new rule changes and Hasek was expected to provide top-notch goaltending.

Prior to the 2004–05 season, the Senators acquired Dany Heatley in a blockbuster trade with the Atlanta Thrashers for Marian Hossa and Greg de Vries. Heatley, Alfredsson and Spezza immediately formed one of the league's top offensive lines, dubbed the "CASH line" by fans in a contest held by the Ottawa Citizen newspaper. The name is made from the initials of Captain Alfredsson, Spezza, and Heatley. Another nickname the line had picked up was the "Pizza Line", used by the Citizen's rival paper, the Ottawa Sun. The line made a dramatic debut in the first game, with Alfredsson scoring a goal to force overtime and Alfredsson and Heatley scoring goals in the league's first-ever shootout round. Heatley became the first player in franchise history to reach 100 points and the first to reach the 50-goal mark. The line was notable as a top offensive line, the top line of all time for the Senators, and was widely regarded as one of the top lines in the NHL earning such quotes as "best trio in the NHL" and "high-flying trio".

The team rushed out of the gate, winning 19 of the first 22 games, in the end winning 52 games and 113 points, placing first in the East, and second overall in the league. Despite the regular season success, the team entered the playoffs under a cloud. In February, Hasek had suffered an adductor muscle injury while playing for the Czech Republic men's national ice hockey team during the 2006 Winter Olympics in Turin. He had played only one game for the Czechs and returned to Ottawa to heal, but would never play for the Senators again. Rookie goaltender Ray Emery had to take over the starting goaltender duties, leading the media to predict an early playoff exit due to Hasek's absence. Hopes were raised in the first round, however, when Emery would become the first rookie goaltender since Philadelphia's Brian Boucher in 2000 to win a playoff series when the Senators defeated the Tampa Bay Lightning four games to one. However, the Senators then lost to the Buffalo Sabres in the second round, a series in which all games were decided by one goal.

This was the last hurrah for several Senators, as Zdeno Chara, Dominik Hasek, Martin Havlat, Bryan Smolinski and Brian Pothier all left the team after the season; Chara, Hasek and Pothier departed via free agency, while Havlat and Smolinski were both dealt to the Chicago Blackhawks.

=== 2006–07: Trip to the Stanley Cup Finals ===
The Senators' season went off to a poor start, and was marked by a struggle to reach a .500 win–loss ratio. Until December, the team had a 21–18–1 record, though they had much more success in the remaining half of the season, eventually finishing second in the Division after the Presidents' Trophy-winning Sabres and earning the fourth seed in the East. They ultimately finished with 105 points, their fourth-straight 100-point season and sixth in their last eight.

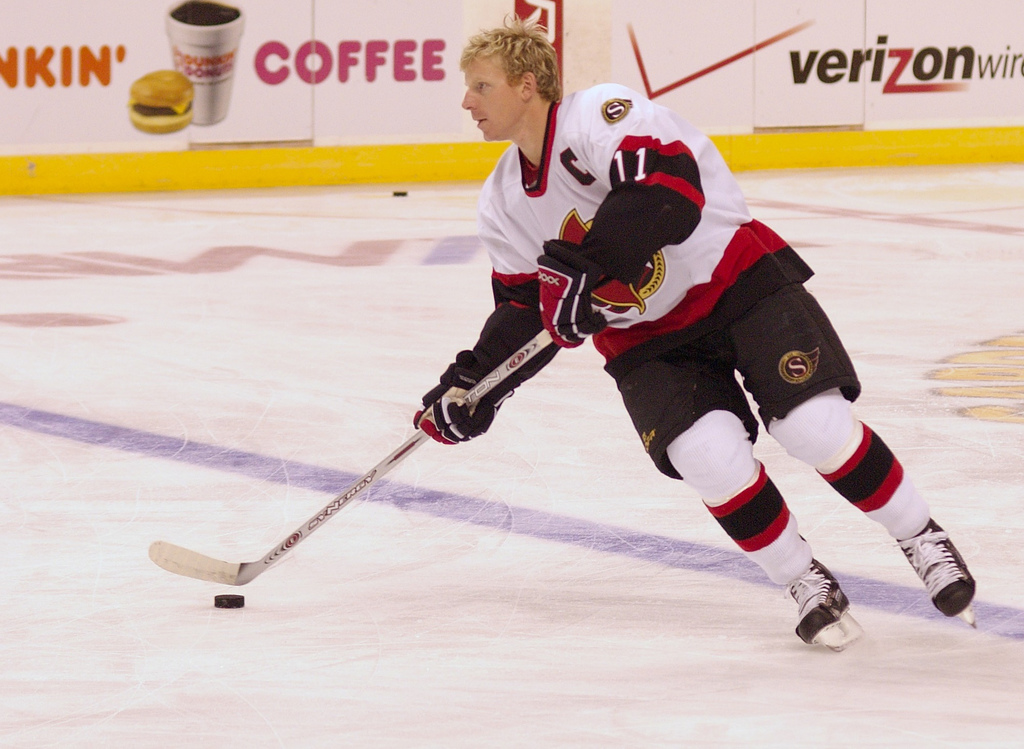
Captain Daniel Alfredsson improved his play in the 2007 playoffs, tallying a league-leading 22 points.

In the playoffs, Ottawa's fourth placing in the Conference meant that the first-round playoff series was against the fifth-seeded Pittsburgh Penguins. Some media were expecting the Penguins to win the series for three reasons—the Penguins had won the season series, the Senators' past playoff troubles and the strong young talent of the Penguins, particularly young star Sidney Crosby. However, the Senators won the series four games to one, including a 3–0 shutout win in game five.

The second-round series was against the Atlantic Division-leading New Jersey Devils in a rematch of the 2003 Eastern Conference finals. The Senators again won the series four games to one.

Next, the Senators faced off against Buffalo in the Conference final, looking to get even for losing to the Sabres in the 2006 playoffs. The Senators took the series, again by a score of four games to one, earning the Prince of Wales Trophy as the Eastern Conference champions and advancing to the Stanley Cup Final to face the Western Conference-winning Anaheim Ducks. Daniel Alfredsson scored the series-winning goal, in overtime, redemption for being beaten a year before on the goal that eliminated Ottawa from the playoffs.

First Stanley Cup Final in the capital in 80 years

The 2006–07 Senators thus became the first Ottawa team to be in the Stanley Cup Final since the 1927 Stanley Cup Final. Despite the 80-year gap, one fan attended games both the 1927 and the 2007 Finals—the third game of the series and first home game for Ottawa on June 2 was attended by 99-year-old Russell Williams as a guest of the Senators. He had attended the last Finals game in Ottawa on April 13, 1927, played in the old Ottawa Auditorium. The 1927 and 2007 games were won by both Senators teams respectively.

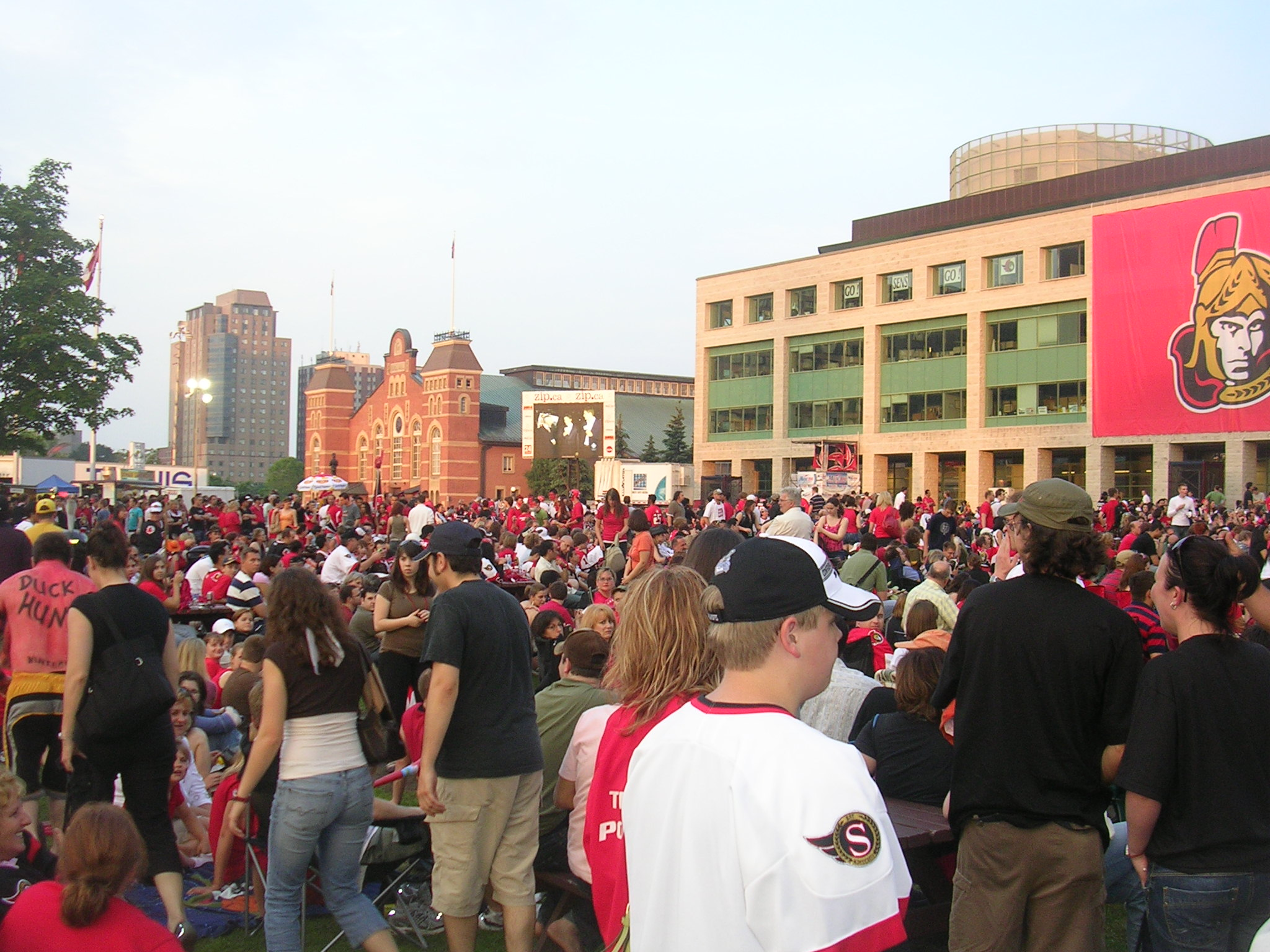
Ottawa City Hall before game three of the Stanley Cup Final

The city was swept up in the excitement of being in the Finals. Businesses along all the main streets posted large hand-drawn "Go Sens Go" signs, residents put up large displays in front of their homes or decorated their cars. A large Senators flag was draped on the City Hall, along with a large video screen showing the games. A six-story likeness of Daniel Alfredsson was hung on the Corel building and the Senators organization held rallies at City Hall, and car rallies of decorated cars paraded from Lynx stadium, through downtown to Scotiabank Place.

The series marked the first time that an NHL team with a captain from Europe had made the Finals, as Senators captain Alfredsson hails from Sweden. Previously, only Americans or Canadians had captained teams in the Finals. Alfredsson would be one of the bright lights for the Senators in the series, as he had been in all the playoff series. But he would be one of the few bright lights as Anaheim won the series in five games bolstered by strong defensive play and opportunistic scoring.

The first two games were in Anaheim, both won by the Ducks by one-goal margins. Game three went to the Senators, but game four in Ottawa was won by the Ducks for an insurmountable three games to one lead. The Ducks would finish the series in game five at home.

=== 2007–08: Stanley Cup hangover ===
The Senators made major changes in their hockey staff during the off-season. On June 17, 2007, general manager John Muckler was fired; he had been in the last year of his contract. Head coach Bryan Murray was subsequently promoted to GM. On July 5, 2007, he hired his nephew Tim Murray as assistant GM, followed by the promotion of assistant coach John Paddock to head coach on July 6, 2007. On August 15, Goaltending coach Ron Low was named as assistant coach while Eli Wilson was named goaltending coach. Assistant coach Greg Carvel retained his duties.

On November 5, 2007, the Senators set a franchise record eighth-straight win with their victory over the Maple Leafs. On November 6, six Senators were named to the All-Star Game ballot: Daniel Alfredsson, Ray Emery, Dany Heatley, Chris Phillips, Wade Redden and Jason Spezza. The "CASH line" was named to the All-Star Game roster in its entirety, Alfredsson to the starting lineup and Dany Heatley and Jason Spezza as reserves. On January 24, 2008, Alfredsson recorded a franchise-record seven points (three goals and four assists) against the Tampa Bay Lightning, taking over the NHL scoring lead momentarily.

After the hot start, a prolonged slump through January and February occurred during which the Senators won only seven of 21 games, and Murray fired head coach Paddock and assistant coach Ron Low on February 27, 2008, taking over the coaching duties himself. After the coaching switch, team performance improved but did not match the performance of the beginning of the season. A playoff spot was in doubt until the Senators' last game of the season, a loss to Boston, but the team qualified due to the Carolina Hurricanes losing. After all other games were played, the team ended up as the seventh seed and faced the Pittsburgh Penguins in the opening round, a repeat of the 2007 Eastern Conference quarterfinals. The Senators lost the series four games to none, the third time they were swept in a first-round series.

=== 2008–09: Season of turnover ===
After a disappointing 2007–08 season, Senators' management promised change, and in the off-season fulfilled that promise with changes both in coaching and on-ice personnel. On June 13, 2008, the Senators named Craig Hartsburg, who had been head coach of the OHL's Sault Ste. Marie Greyhounds, as the new head coach, signing him to a three-year contract. The Senators also named Curtis Hunt, formerly of the Regina Pats, as assistant coach. On the player side, the first change was the buy-out of troubled goaltender Ray Emery's contract following a difficult season. Long-time Senator Wade Redden left via free-agency, and 2007–08 trade acquisitions Mike Commodore, Cory Stillman and Martin Lapointe were not re-signed. Brian McGrattan and Andrej Meszaros were traded, Meszaros following a contract dispute. From the free agent market, the Senators signed goaltender Alex Auld, defenceman Jason Smith, and agitating forward Jarkko Ruutu. In exchange for Meszaros, defencemen Filip Kuba, Alexandre Picard and a 2009 first-round draft pick (later dealt for defenceman Chris Campoli) were acquired from the Tampa Bay Lightning.

To start the 2008–09 season, the Senators played their first-ever games in Europe, starting in Gothenburg, Sweden, playing Daniel Alfredsson's former team, Frölunda HC. The Senators then began the regular season with two games in Stockholm against the Pittsburgh Penguins, splitting the results in a 4–3 overtime loss and a 3–1 win. The Senators struggled throughout the first half of the season, having the lowest number of goals scored in the league. Following a disappointing 17–24–7 start, the Senators fired Hartsburg on February 1, 2009, after a 7–4 loss to the Washington Capitals. He was replaced by Cory Clouston, the head coach of their farm team in Binghamton. The team showed almost immediate improvement under Clouston, playing above .500 for the remainder of the season. Though much improved, the team was unable to make up for its poor start, and was officially eliminated from playoff contention on March 31. The team continued to play well, winning nine games in a row at home. On April 8, Clouston was rewarded with a two-year deal to continue coaching the Senators.

=== 2009–10: Return to the playoffs ===
After the season concluded, word was leaked that star forward Heatley demanded a trade, placing GM Murray in a precarious position. On June 30, a deal to the Edmonton Oilers was finalized, but Heatley rejected it by refusing to waive his no-trade clause. On September 12, 2009, Heatley was traded, along with a fifth-round pick in 2010 NHL entry draft, to the San Jose Sharks in exchange for forwards Milan Michalek and Jonathan Cheechoo, as well as a second-round pick in the 2010 NHL Entry Draft.

On January 13, 2010, Bryan Murray relieved goaltending coach Eli Wilson of his duties. Immediately afterward, the team went on a team-record 11-game winning streak. The streak propelled the team to the top of the Northeast Division standings and a top-three placing for the playoffs. The team was unable to hold off the Sabres for the division lead, but qualified for the playoffs in the fifth position. For the third season in four, the Senators played off against the Penguins in the first round. A highlight for the Senators was winning a triple-overtime fifth game in Pittsburgh, but the team was unable to win a playoff game on home ice, losing the series in six games.

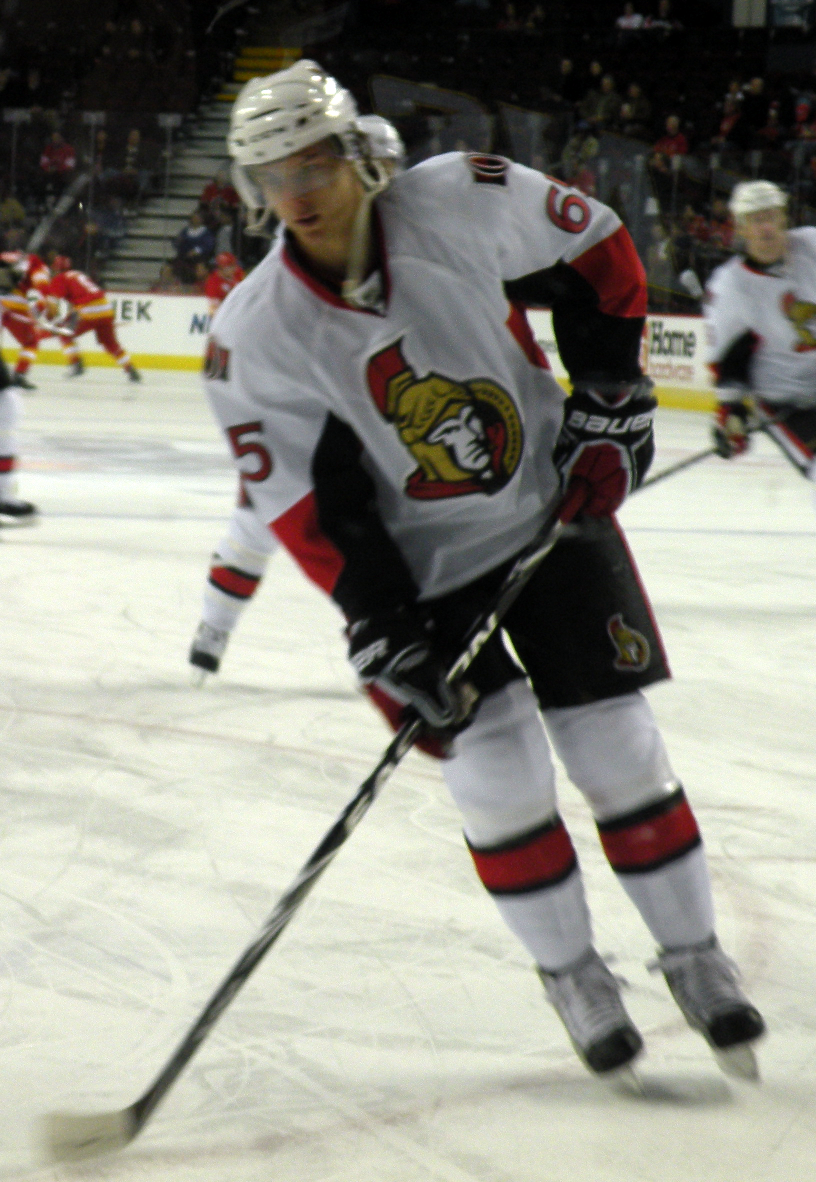
Young All-Star defenceman Erik Karlsson was regarded as a cornerstone of the franchise as it rebuilt.

=== 2010–11: Rebuilding ===
The Senators had a much poorer than expected 2010–11 campaign, resulting in constant rumours of a shakeup right through until December. The rumours were heightened in January after the team went on a lengthy losing streak. January was a dismal month for the Senators, winning only one game all month. Media speculated on the imminent firing of Clouston, Murray or both. Owner Melynk cleared the air in an article in the January 22, 2011, edition of the Ottawa Sun. Melnyk stated that he would not fire either Clouston or Murray, but that he had given up on this season and was in the process of developing a plan for the future. On Monday, January 24, The Globe and Mail newspaper reported that the plan included hiring a new general manager before the June entry draft and that Murray would be retained as an advisor to the team. A decision on whether to retain Clouston would be made by the new general manager. The article by Roy MacGregor, a long-time reporter of the Ottawa Senators, stated that former assistant coach Pierre McGuire had already been interviewed. Murray, in a press conference that day stated that he wished to stay on as the team's general manager. He also stated that Melnyk was allowing him to continue as general manager without restraint. Murray said that the players were now to be judged by their play until the February 28 trade deadline. Murray would attempt to move "a couple, at least" of the players for draft picks or prospects at that time if the Senators remained out of playoff contention. At the time of Murray's comments the team was eight games under .500 and 14 points out of a playoff position after 49 games.

Murray started with the trading of Mike Fisher to the Nashville Predators in exchange for a first-round pick in the 2011 draft. Fisher already had a home in Nashville with new wife Carrie Underwood. The trading of Fisher, a fan favorite in Ottawa, lead to a small anti-Underwood backlash in the city with the banning of her songs from the play lists of some local radio stations. Murray next traded Chris Kelly, another veteran, to the Boston Bruins for a second-round pick in the 2011 draft. A few days later, pending unrestricted free agent Jarkko Ruutu was sent to the Anaheim Ducks in exchange for a sixth-round pick in 2011. A swap of goaltenders was made with the Colorado Avalanche which brought Craig Anderson to Ottawa in exchange for Brian Elliott. On trade deadline day, Ottawa picked up goaltender Curtis McElhinney on waivers. Goaltender Anderson played very well down the stretch for Ottawa, and the team quickly signed the soon-to-be unrestricted free agent to a four-year contract. After media speculation on the future of Murray within the organization, Murray was re-signed as general manager on April 8, to a three-year extension. On April 9, head coach Cory Clouston and assistants Greg Carvel and Brad Lauer were dismissed from their positions. Former Detroit Red Wings assistant coach Paul MacLean was hired as Clouston's replacement on June 14, 2011.

=== 2011–2016: Up and down seasons ===
As the 2011–12 season began, many hockey writers and commentators were convinced that the Senators would finish at or near the bottom of the NHL standings. In the midst of rebuilding, the Ottawa lineup contained many rookies and inexperienced players. The team struggled out of the gate, losing five of their first six games before a reversal of fortunes saw them win six games in a row. In December 2011, the team acquired forward Kyle Turris from the Phoenix Coyotes in exchange for David Rundblad and a draft pick. The team improved its play afterwards and moved into a playoff position before the All-Star Game. For the first time in Senators' history, the All-Star Game was held in Ottawa, and it was considered a great success. Five Senators were voted in or named to the event, including Daniel Alfredsson, who was named captain of one team. The team continued its playoff push after the break. After starting goalie Craig Anderson injured his hand in a kitchen accident at home, the Senators called up Robin Lehner from Binghamton and acquired highly regarded goaltender Ben Bishop from the St. Louis Blues. On April 1, 2012, the Senators defeated the New York Islanders 5–1, officially ensuring a playoff position. The team finished as the eighth seed in the Eastern Conference, drawing a first round playoff matchup against the Conference champion New York Rangers. Ultimately, Ottawa lost the series in seven games.

The next season, Ottawa was challenged to repeat the success they had in 2011–12, but sustained long-term injuries to key players such as Erik Karlsson, Jason Spezza, Milan Michalek and Craig Anderson. Despite these injuries, the Senators finished seventh in the Eastern Conference and head coach Paul MacLean won the Jack Adams Award as the NHL's coach of the year. Ottawa would play the second-seeded Montreal Canadiens in the first round of the playoffs, eventually winning in five games. The Senators then advanced to play the top-seeded Pittsburgh Penguins in the second round, this time losing in five games. July 5, 2013, would be a day of mixed emotions for the city and fans, as long-time captain Daniel Alfredsson signed a one-year contract with the Detroit Red Wings, leaving Ottawa after 17 seasons with the Senators and 14 as captain. The signing shocked numerous fans across the city and many within the Senators organization. The day finished optimistically as Murray acquired star forward Bobby Ryan from the Anaheim Ducks in exchange for forwards Jakob Silfverberg, Stefan Noesen and a first-round draft pick in 2014. Murray would also sign forward Clarke MacArthur to a two-year contract that same day.

For the 2013–14 season, the league re-aligned and Ottawa was moved to the new, reconstituted Atlantic Division along with the rest of the old Northeast Division and the Columbus Blue Jackets and Detroit Red Wings from the Western Conference. The team failed to make the playoffs due to inconsistent play throughout the season.

The following off-season, the team traded Jason Spezza to the Dallas Stars. On July 7, 2014, Murray revealed he was diagnosed with stage four colon cancer and that he was receiving treatment for it. The Senators struggled during the first half of the season, leading up to Paul MacLean's dismissal from the team in favor of assistant coach Dave Cameron. During their struggles, Alfredsson signed a one-day contract with the Senators to retire with the team. Their struggles, coupled with injuries, continued past the All Star break in which both Craig Anderson and Robin Lehner were out with injuries, forcing rookie Andrew Hammond to be called up from Binghamton. However, Hammond would lead the Senators on a 23–4–4 run, in which he earned the nickname "the Hamburglar", and the team overcame a 14-point deficit in the standings to earn the first wild card spot. Following their strong end to the season, they matched up against the Canadiens in the playoffs, but lost in six games.

== 2017–2023: Pierre Dorion era: Decline and rebuilding ==
The year 2016 saw major changes within the Senators organization. Bryan Murray retired in April 2016 after the 2015–16 season, another season where the team failed to make the playoffs. The team promoted assistant GM Pierre Dorion to general manager. Dorion fired Dave Cameron and his staff and hired Guy Boucher and Marc Crawford as associate head coaches. The Senators moved their AHL affiliate team from Binghamton, New York to Belleville, Ontario, to become the Belleville Senators.

The 2016–17 season was a surprise high point for the team as it made a playoff run to the Eastern Conference final for the third time in franchise history. The team narrowly missing qualifying for the Stanley Cup Finals, losing in double-overtime in the seventh game of the series. The team had picked up several veterans that made key contributions and MacArthur, Karlsson, Turris and Ryan made crucial contributions.

Fan-sponsored billboard

The 2017–18 season was a major disappointment. From the playoff run team, the team lost MacArthur (injury), Marc Methot (expansion draft), Chris Neil (free agency/retirement), Chris Kelly (free agency), Tommy Wingels (free agency) and Viktor Stalberg (free agency). Additionally, captain Erik Karlsson was injured to start the season and first-line center Kyle Turris was in a contract dispute with the team. Turris was traded to the Nashville Predators by way of a three team trade with Nashville and the Colorado Avalanche which resulted in Ottawa acquiring Matt Duchene. The team at first absorbed the changes and remained in a playoff spot. However, team play declined to the point where the team traded away several veterans at the trade deadline and finished in 30th place in the league. The team hosted the NHL 100 Classic outdoor game to great success at TD Place Stadium, however, owner Eugene Melnyk made off-the-cuff comments about fan attendance that soured fan opinions.

The 2017 playoffs run is the most recent season in which the Senators qualified for the playoffs. In the succeeding seasons, Dorion traded away many of its top players in exchange for draft picks and prospects. Team captain Karlsson was traded in September 2018 to the San Jose Sharks for several players and draft picks. Karlsson and team-mate Mike Hoffman had been involved in a personal controversy between each player's girlfriends. Hoffman was also traded in 2018. Mark Stone was traded to the Vegas Golden Knights after he turned down an Ottawa Senators contract offer. Matt Duchene was traded to the Columbus Blue Jackets. Bobby Ryan was bought out after personal problems sidelined him for long stretches. Received in return were numerous high draft picks, with which the Senators drafted a core of young players, including Tim Stutzle, Brady Tkachuk, Josh Norris, Drake Batherson, Thomas Chabot, Shane Pinto and Jake Sanderson.

During this period, fan attendance at Senators games declined. Fans repeatedly called for Melnyk to sell the team, and an online campaign called "MelnykOut" posted billboard messages around the city. Dissatisfaction was also high with general manager Dorion and head coach D. J. Smith. Former captain Daniel Alfredsson himself suggested the Senators needed a new owner.

After several seasons near the bottom of the standings, the team contended for a playoff spot in 2022–23 after adding veterans Claude Giroux, Alex DeBrincat and Jakob Chychrun. However, DeBrincat indicated he did not wish to stay with the Senators long-term and was traded to the Detroit Red Wings, his hometown team, after the season.

== 2022–present: Death of Melnyk and sale to Michael Andlauer ==
In March 2022, team owner Melnyk succumbed to a terminal illness. The months that followed were filled with speculation on the status of the team. Although Melnyk had promised that the team would remain in his two daughters' hands, in December 2022 the team announced that the team would be sold, the only condition on the sale being that the team must remain in Ottawa. The NHL, in conjunction with a New York investment banker, conducted a sale process that attracted several high-profile bidders. Besides the team, the Senators Sports & Entertainment corporation owns the existing arena and hundreds of acres of land around the arena, plus an option on a downtown arena site. Despite the high value of its assets, the corporation was reported to have a high level of debt, which may have precipitated the sale. According to reports, Melnyk bought the team using financing of US$50 million, or half of the purchase price. By the time of Melynk's passing, the amount of debt on the team was estimated to be US$450 million. Several celebrities were linked to groups interested in purchasing the team, including Ryan Reynolds and Snoop Dogg.

In September 2023, the sale of the Senators was completed to a group of investors headed by Michael Andlauer. The daughters of Eugene Melnyk retained a 10% legacy share in the team. Andlauer named Steve Staios as president of hockey operations. After the Senators lost a first-round pick due to a mistake in the trade of Evgeni Dadonov, Andlauer fired Pierre Dorion, naming Staios as interim general manager. After a poor start to the season, the Senators next fired head coach D. J. Smith in December.

== Logo and jersey design ==
The team colours are red, black and white, like the original era Senators, and like other Ottawa sports teams (such as the Ottawa Renegades, Rough Riders and 67s), with added trim of gold.

The club logo is officially the head of a Roman general, a member of the Senate of the Roman Empire, projecting from a gold circle. There have been several versions of the team logo. The original, unveiled on May 23, 1991, described the general as a "centurion figure, strong and prominent" according to its designer, Tony Milchard. Milchard intended the logo to be similar to that of the Chicago Blackhawks head logo. Leaked before its unveiling, the logo design was unpopular with fans, being compared unfavourably to the American Express card, the USC Trojans and the Trojan condom. The original had the words "Ottawa Senators" within the circle. This logo was slightly revised in 1996 to remove the team name from the gold circle and replace it with laurels.

The Senators jerseys as used from 2003 until 2007

The original home jersey was white with black and red stripes. The original "away" jersey was black, with white and red trim. Shoulder patches used a winged "S" in "established MDCCCXCIV" (1894) logo. The league changed its policies on coloured and white jerseys and the white jersey became the away jersey. The club would use the white jersey with the original logo until the end of the 2007 Stanley Cup Final.

In 1998, the Senators unveiled a new logo, taking the head, which had been in profile, and rotating it so that it was face-first. The new logo was unveiled with a new red "third" jersey, prominently using "curved" or "swoosh" stripes. On the shoulder, the original logo was used as a shoulder patch. The original dark jersey, (then the "away" jersey) which was mostly black, was retired after the season. The red jersey became the home jersey and it remained in use until the end of the 2007 Stanley Cup Final.

Starting in July 2000, the Senators reused the alternate logo on another third jersey, designed by Ottawa firm Hoselton Brunet, this one black with red and gold sleeves and a gold stripe with laurel leaves along the bottom of the jersey. On the shoulders, was a modified version of the original Peace Tower logo of the expansion campaign, which the management liked. Like the original logo, this design was leaked onto the Internet. This jersey was in use until the end of the 2006–07 season.

=== 2007 update ===
On August 22, 2007, the Senators unveiled a set of new jerseys, which have a more refined, streamlined look to them. The team retired all three previous jerseys and did not have a third jersey for the 2007–08 season. The updated look came in conjunction with the launch of the new Rbk EDGE jerseys by Reebok, adopted league-wide for the 2007–08 season.

At the same time, the team updated its logos, designed by local firm Acart Communications. The new primary logo is an update of the old secondary logo, which according to team owner Eugene Melnyk, "represents strength and determination". The logo was modified in several ways, updating the facial features, removing facial colouring, reducing size of the gold semicircle and updating the cape of the warrior. The new secondary logo is an update of the old primary logo. Only the primary logo will appear on the jerseys, as the secondary logo will be on Sens' merchandise. The new shoulder patch 'O' logo replaces the winged 'S' shoulder patch with the jersey logo of the original Ottawa Senators club.

=== 2008 and 2011 third jerseys ===
On November 22, 2008, the Senators unveiled a new third jersey in a game versus the New York Rangers. Marketed with the slogan 'Back in Black' in reference to the black "away" jerseys the team wore during its first several seasons, the jersey is primarily black, while the team's other traditional colors of white and red are also integrated. The Senators' primary "centurion figure" logo moved to the shoulders.

On January 20, 2011, the Ottawa Sun reported that the Senators organization was studying designs for a new third jersey to commemorate the 20th anniversary of the current franchise. The Senators announced to season ticket holders on March 2, 2011, that the new third jersey is a 'heritage design' based on the early-era Senators jersey. The new third jersey was to be unveiled officially on October 1, 2011, however was mistakenly leaked after being discovered in a souvenir store at First Niagara Center. The jersey is a 'barber-pole' design with a large 'O' on the front, and shield-shaped badges on each shoulder. One shoulder badge has the words "Ottawa Senators", the other has the words "Sénateurs d'Ottawa".

Mostly black, the third jersey incorporates horizontal striping intended to be reminiscent of the original Senators' 'barber-pole' designs, and the large letter O used in Ottawa jersey designs going back to the 1890s. The new jersey, while an entirely new creation, most resembles the look of the 1926–27 Senators, when the franchise won its last Stanley Cup. Shield-type patches were added to the shoulders. The design of the shield-type patches was intended to be similar to the shield patches that the original Senators added to their jerseys after each Stanley Cup championship win. The patches spell the team name, one in English, and one in French. Jacob Barrette, a local Gatineau, Quebec fan had posted a similar design on the internet since 2009. The Senators worked with Barrette to develop the jersey design in time for the 20th anniversary season.

=== 2014 Heritage Classic jersey ===
A special edition jersey was used for the 2014 Heritage Classic against the Vancouver Canucks on March 2, 2014. The jersey shared virtually the same characteristics as their then-current third jersey, albeit reversed so that cream is the primary colour.

=== 2017 update ===
The move to Adidas as the NHL's uniform provider necessitated some slight changes in the Senators uniforms. While the overall design was carried over from the Reebok Edge look, the fonts now use the style that was found on the barber-pole third jerseys they wore from 2011 to 2017.

=== 2020 return to original style and 'Reverse Retro' jerseys ===
In 2020, the Senators reintroduced its 1997–2007 logo as its primary jersey logo, with the jersey set used from 1992 to 1995. The updated logo uses a gold outline as opposed to red. The new uniforms, while largely resembling the originals from the 1990s, retained the lettering font used since the Adidas takeover, while the white uniforms retained only the black and red stripes along the upper arm sleeves. Both the home and away uniforms include a red band across the very bottom of the jerseys. In addition, the Senators unveiled a "Reverse Retro" alternate uniform; the design was of the original 1992–93 uniform but with red as the base colour. In the 2022–23 season, the Senators wore "Reverse Retro" uniforms based on the alternates they wore from 1997 to 2007, but with the current 2-D logo in front, black as the base colour and less white elements.

== See also ==
- Battle of Ontario
- Ice hockey in Ottawa
- List of NHL players
- List of NHL seasons
- List of ice hockey teams in Ontario
