= Cyril Leeder =

Canadian businessman (born 1959)

- Born: Cyril Leeder; September 20, 1959 (age 67); Brockville, Ontario, Canada

Cyril Leeder (born September 20, 1959) is a Canadian businessman. He is the current president of the Ottawa Senators professional ice hockey team in the National Hockey League (NHL) and its corporation, the Senators Sports & Entertainment Corporation. Leeder is also a member of the Ottawa Community Ice Partnership, which organizes the annual Bell Capital Cup minor ice hockey tournament.

== Personal information ==
Born in Brockville, Ontario, Leeder graduated from McMaster University in 1982. Upon graduation, Leeder became a chartered accountant with Clarkson, Gordon of Ottawa.

== Career ==
In 1984, Leeder joined Terrace Investments, becoming president in 1987, and CEO from 1988 until 1992.Cyril Leeder was one of the principals, along with Terrace Investments' Bruce Firestone and Randy Sexton in the 'Bring Back the Senators' campaign in 1989 and 1990, which culminated in the NHL granting a franchise to the Terrace Investments group and the return of the Ottawa Senators to the NHL.

Leeder remained with the organization after Firestone left in a change of ownership, and after Sexton was fired from the general manager's job. Leeder remained with the organization in charge of the Palladium arena, now known as the Canadian Tire Centre. Leeder is credited with being the founder of the Bell Capital Cup, an annual ice hockey tournament held in Ottawa. Leeder was also responsible for the Bell Sensplex project, an arena and practice facility for the Senators.

On June 16, 2009, Leeder was named team president, succeeding Roy Mlakar. On January 25, 2017 Leeder was fired from his position as President and CEO of the Senators by owner Eugene Melnyk and was replaced by former MLSE executive Tom Anselmi. On September 2023, Leeder returned to his position after Michael Andaluer purchased the team.

== Awards ==
- 2012 - Ottawa Sports Hall of Fame
- 2013 - Brockville and Area Sports Hall of Fame
