= Alexei Yashin =

Russian ice hockey player (born 1973)

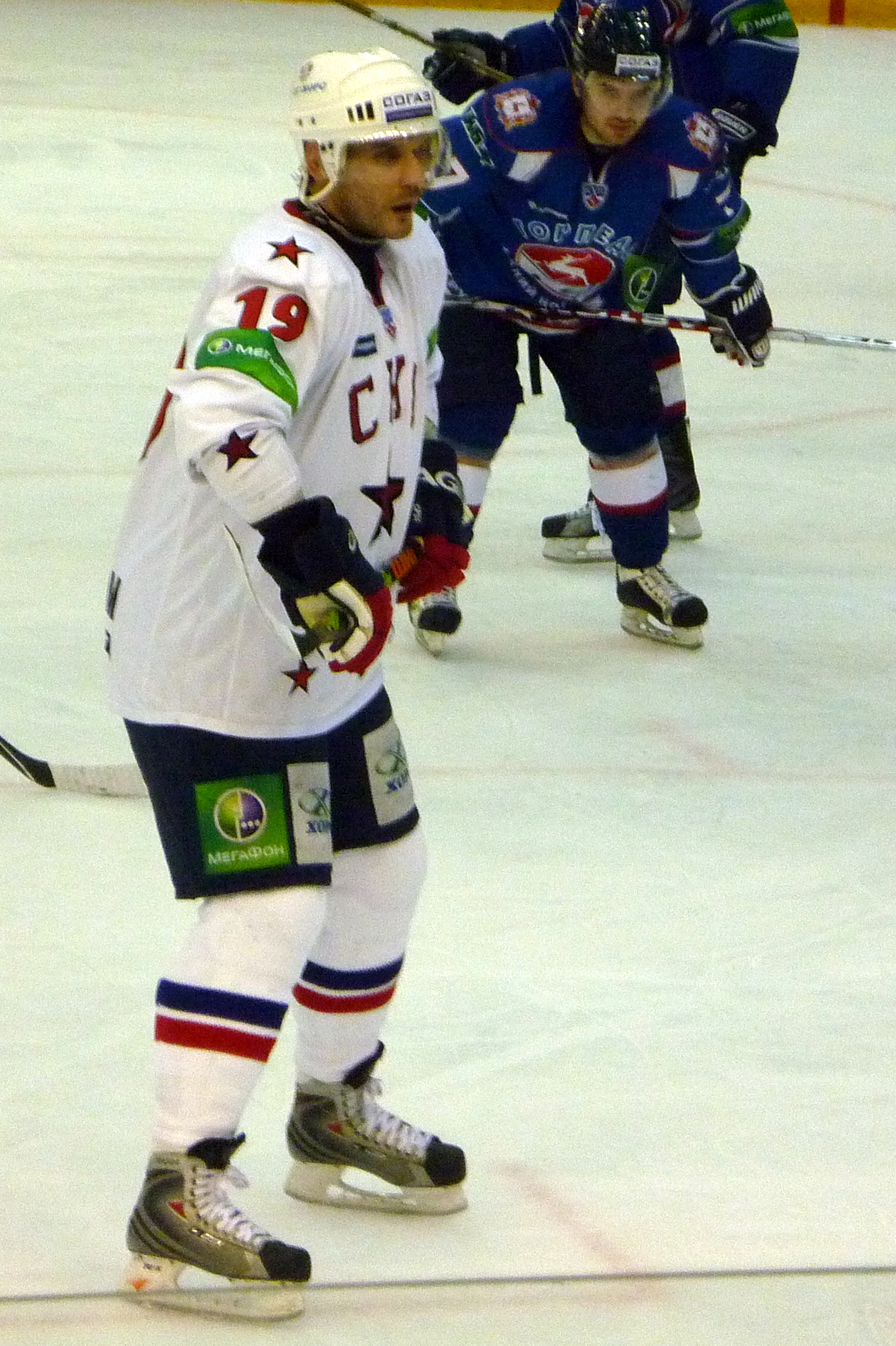
- Yashin with SKA Saint Petersburg in 2010
- Born: 5 November 1973 (age 52) Sverdlovsk, Russian SFSR, Soviet Union
- Height: 6 ft 3 in (191 cm)
- Weight: 230 lb (104 kg; 16 st 6 lb)
- Position: Centre
- Shot: Right
- Played for: Avtomobilist Sverdlovsk; Dynamo Moscow; Ottawa Senators; CSKA Moscow; New York Islanders; Lokomotiv Yaroslavl; SKA Saint Petersburg
- National team: Unified Team and Russia
- NHL draft: 2nd overall, 1992; Ottawa Senators
- Playing career: 1990–2012

Alexei Valeryevich Yashin (Russian: Алексей Валерьевич Яшин; born 5 November 1973) is a Russian former professional ice hockey centre who played 12 seasons in the National Hockey League (NHL) for the Ottawa Senators and New York Islanders, serving as captain of both teams. He also played nine seasons in the Russian Superleague (RSL) and Kontinental Hockey League (KHL) for Dynamo Moscow, CSKA Moscow, Lokomotiv Yaroslavl, and SKA Saint Petersburg. He was inducted into the IIHF Hall of Fame in 2020. He was named the most valuable player of the RSL in 2008 and has won two gold medals, one silver, and two bronze medals in international play.

== Playing career ==
=== Russia ===
Yashin began his professional career playing for Avtomobilist Sverdlovsk in the Soviet Union in the 1990–91 season before joining Dynamo Moscow of the Soviet Championship League for the 1991–92 season on a three-year contract. In 28 games with Dynamo, he scored seven goals and three assists for ten points. He was heralded as one of the top European prospects ahead of the National Hockey League (NHL)'s entry draft, ranked second among skaters by the NHL's Central Scouting Bureau. He returned to Dynamo for the 1992–93 season, recording ten goals and 22 points in 27 games.

=== Ottawa Senators (1993–2001) ===
Going into the 1992 NHL entry draft, the consensus was that the Tampa Bay Lightning, with the first overall selection, would select another player and that Roman Hamrlík would be available when the Ottawa Senators selected second. However, the Lightning selected Hamrlík, and the Senators turned to Yashin as their backup plan. Still under contract in Russia, it was only at the beginning of April 1993 did the Senators seek to get Yashin signed and travelled to Europe to negotiate with him. They reached a tentative agreement that month. However, in order to facilitate the signing, Ottawa was rumoured to have paid a $500,000 release fee to Dynamo Moscow in order to acquire the player. The deal was reportedly for five years and $2.2 million. Yashin arrived in Ottawa for the 1993–94 season, along with Ottawa's other highly touted first overall draft selection, Alexandre Daigle. He made his debut in the Senators season opener on 16 October, a 5–5 tie with the Quebec Nordiques and recorded his first NHL point, assisting on Bob Kudelski's second period goal. He marked his first NHL goal in his third game, a 5–4 loss to the Florida Panthers on 14 October. On 3 November, he recorded five points in a game, including his first hat trick, in a 7–5 victory over the Edmonton Oilers. The next night, he recorded four assists in a 7–6 overtime win over the Winnipeg Jets. Yashin soon eclipsed Daigle as the team's brightest young star and after Ottawa's representative to the NHL All-Star Game was traded to Florida, Yashin was selected as his replacement. He was the only rookie at the All-Star Game, but stood out, scoring two goals including the game winner for the Eastern Conference. On 24 February he recorded three assists in a 6–4 victory over the San Jose Sharks. He had another three-point night on 23 March, marking one goal (the game winner) and two assists in a 5–4 comeback win over the Detroit Red Wings. In April, he had a four-point night on 6 April with one goal and three assists in a 6–5 win over the Washington Capitals and the next night, a three-point game with one goal and three assists in a 5–4 loss to the Boston Bruins. In 83 games with Ottawa, he scored 30 goals and 79 points, finishing second in rookie scoring. During the season, he scored or assisted on almost a third of all of Ottawa's goals, earning him a nomination for the Calder Memorial Trophy. However, Yashin was not among the three finalists for the award, and his omission caused some shock among the Senators organization, as he had widely been tapped to be one of them. He finished fourth in voting.

==== Contract disputes ====
Off the ice, Yashin's time in Ottawa was tumultuous. Senators' management initially viewed Daigle, who had been selected first overall in the 1993 NHL entry draft, as the franchise's cornerstone player. While they hesitated in offering Yashin a five-year, $4 million contract, they signed Daigle to one of the largest rookie contracts in history and touted him over Yashin for the Calder Memorial Trophy at the conclusion of the 1993–94 season. Yashin began making demands to re-negotiate his contract in June 1994, threatening to hold out, later demanding a trade. However, before he could complete his threat, the NHL locked out the players in a labour action, causing a delay to the start of the 1994–95 season. The lockout lasted until January 1995. Yashin became the first NHL player to swap leagues during the lockout, signing with the Las Vegas Thunder of the International Hockey League (IHL) in October. Yashin was criticized by the National Hockey League Players' Association (NHLPA) representative Steve Chiasson, claiming that signing in the IHL took away jobs from other hockey players. This was exemplified by Ottawa's newest first round draft pick from the 1994 NHL entry draft, Radek Bonk, who was also in a contract stalemate with the team, and was contracted to Las Vegas. Bonk, who had starred with Las Vegas the prior season, saw his ice time decline as he was replaced by Yashin on the power play and his production plummeted, with many Ottawa fans now seeing Bonk as a bust. After Yashin and Kevin Dineen signed with IHL teams during the lockout, the IHL commissioner, Bob Ufer, prevented any further signings of NHL players within the league. While with Las Vegas, Yashin underwent surgery for a hernia, missing three weeks. In 24 games with the Thunder, Yashin scored 15 goals and 35 points. Once the lockout ended in January 1995, Yashin was informed he was no longer eligible to play in the IHL. He continued to hold out and was suspended by Ottawa without pay until he returned to the team. He finally agreed to return to the Senators on 21 January after arriving at an agreement concerning bonuses with management. He recorded his first three-point game of the season on 2 February, tallying one goal and two assists in a 6–4 loss to the Boston Bruins. The game after he had been benched for indifferent play by his coach, Rick Bowness, Yashin recorded a hat trick in a 5–5 tie with the Washington Capitals on 23 February. After Daigle was moved to join Yashin's line alongside Rob Gaudreau, the three began scoring at a heightened pace, with Yashin adding three assists in a 11–4 thumping by the Quebec Nordiques on 26 March. The line registered eight points in the game and scored 75 percent of the team's goals, but their defensive capabilities were limited, as they were on the ice for three of the New Jersey Devils' goals in a 4–2 loss on 29 March. He finished the season with 21 goals and 44 points in 47 games.

The contract dispute between Ottawa and Yashin began again in June 1995, when Yashin demanded a trade after the team refused to renegotiate his deal and what he considered the team's poor response after his father was injured in a car accident. Senators' owner Rod Bryden refused to give in to his demands and threatened to send Yashin to the Thunder Bay Senators of the Colonial Hockey League. Rumours of a possible move to the New York Islanders also began that offseason. A trade was nearly completed with the Detroit Red Wings where Yashin would have been exchanged for star centre Steve Yzerman. The Senators' director of player personnel John Ferguson made public remarks in support of keeping Yashin in August which were criticized by the team's general manager Randy Sexton, leading to Ferguson's departure a week later. He refused to honour his contract at the onset of the 1995–96 season, unless the terms were renegotiated to make him the team's highest-paid player. Some commentators sympathized with Yashin's position in the initial disputes, as Daigle had struggled to live up to his billing while Yashin's offensive numbers exceeded Daigle's in every season they played together. Yashin returned to Russia in October, where he joined CSKA Moscow ("Central Red Army") and played two games in contravention of international agreements. CSKA Moscow, the Ice Hockey Federation of Russia, and the International Ice Hockey Federation (IIHF) then had a nine-hour meeting that resulted in a public declaration that Yashin and CSKA Moscow had broken the agreements and that Yashin was ineligible to play with them, on threat of international sanctions. After appearing in a further two games CSKA Moscow bowed to international pressure after threats of expulsion from the Russian leagues and international bans for all of their players and Yashin was removed from the roster. In the four games in Russia, he scored two goals and four points.

On 11 December Sexton was fired as general manager, and his replacement, Pierre Gauthier, stated his first job was to get Yashin back with the team. On 30 December, the Senators signed Yashin to a five-year deal, $13 million deal. Yashin made his 1995–96 season debut on 31 December in a 3–0 shutout loss to the Tampa Bay Lighting. He recorded a three-point night on 29 January 1996, marking a goal and two assists in a 4–2 victory over the St. Louis Blues. In the next match against St. Louis on 20 February, he netted a hat trick and five points in a 7–1 win, which also marked the first match of the Senators' new head coach, Jacques Martin. In 46 games, Yashin scored 15 goals and 39 points.

==== Playoffs bound ====
During the 1996 offseason, the Senators underwent a major overhaul and by the start of training camp, only 18 of the 50 players who had been on the roster to start the 1995–96 season remained. Yashin entered the 1996–97 season without a contract squabble for the first time in three years. In their first full season in the new arena, the Palladium, Yashin centered the first line with the 1996 Calder Trophy winner Daniel Alfredsson and Shawn McEachern. The Senators played well to start the season and on 19 and 24 October Yashin recorded two goals and an assist in wins over the Montreal Canadiens and Tampa Bay Lightning. However, a quarter of the way through the season, Yashin went through a scoring slump and the Senators fell out of a playoff position in the standings. It was not until 26 December that Yashin recorded another three-point outing, scoring two goals and an assist in a 5–2 victory over the New York Rangers, after Sergei Zholtok replaced McEachern on the top line. He tallied a three-point night on 11 January 1997, participating in all three of Ottawa's goals in a 3–3 tie with the Pittsburgh Penguins, scoring once and assisting on the two others. On 3 and 18 February and 22 and 29 March, Yashin marked three-point nights in wins over the Vancouver Canucks, Washington Capitals, Boston Bruins, and Montreal Canadiens. The Senators made the Stanley Cup playoffs for the first time in 1997 in the final game of the season. Facing the Buffalo Sabres and Dominik Hašek, considered one of the best goaltenders in the league, the game remained tied at zero late in the third period when Yashin found Steve Duchesne who sent a shot past Hašek to score the game winning goal. Yashin recorded 35 goals and 76 points in 82 games during the regular season. The Senators faced the Sabres in the first round in a best-of-seven series, and Yashin recorded his first NHL playoff goal on 21 April in a 3–2 loss. The Senators pushed the Sabres to overtime in game seven, but ultimately lost. Yashin tallied the one goal and six points in the seven games.

Yashin began the 1997–98 season with a new linemate, as Alfredsson was a contract holdout. Alfredsson was replaced by rookie Marián Hossa and Yashin marked two three-point games to start the season, one on 12 October in a 7–4 loss to the Los Angeles Kings and the other in a 6–2 win over the Toronto Maple Leafs on 22 October. On 10 January 1998, he recorded his fourth career hat trick, scoring all of the team's goals in a 3–3 tie with the Colorado Avalanche. He recorded three more three-point games the rest of the season, on 5 March against Colorado, 11 March against the Florida Panthers, and the Buffalo Sabres on 11 April. Yashin finished the regular season with 33 goals and 72 points in 82 games.

In March 1998, Yashin initially pledged to give $1 million to the National Arts Centre (NAC) in Ottawa, then the NAC's largest ever donation. The Senators had earlier collaborated with the NAC to produce the 1998–99 season program titled "Symphony on Ice", which featured Senators head coach Jacques Martin on the front cover wearing a tuxedo and waving a conductor's baton, while NAC music director Pinchas Zukerman was shown in the Senators' locker room with a #00 Senators jersey. When the NAC learned that one of the conditions of this donation was for them to pay Yashin's parents $425,000 in consulting fees for "loosely defined" services, they balked and Yashin cancelled the donation in January 1999. The failed arrangement was a public relations disaster for Yashin and his family, and served to further damage Yashin's already strained relationship with the Ottawa public.

The Senators qualified for the 1998 playoffs, and faced the New Jersey Devils in the first round. Yashin scored a key overtime goal that helped the Senators win their first ever playoff series, and along with Alfredsson and goaltender Damian Rhodes, was instrumental in knocking off the first place Devils. However, in the second round against the Washington Capitals, Yashin was shut down by Esa Tikkanen, who held him to one goal and two points in the series, as the Senators were eliminated. In 11 playoff games, he scored five goals and eight points.

In the offseason, general manager Pierre Gauthier resigned his position and was replaced by Rick Dudley. Yashin was named team captain ahead of the 1998–99 season. He recorded three-point nights in wins on 26 November and 8 December. On 18 December, Yashin marked five points, taking part in all of the Senators' goals in a 5–1 victory over the Carolina Hurricanes. Yashin and teammate Ron Tugnutt were selected to represent Ottawa at the All-Star Game in January 1999, with Yashin playing for the World Team, marking the first time the Senators had more than one player attend the game. He followed his All-Star appearance up with three-point games on 30 January and 15 February. On 4 March, he recorded a hat trick and four points in a 5–0 shutout win over the Philadelphia Flyers. He marked another three-point game on 8 March, and then two more four-point games on 27 March and 3 April. He finished the season recording 44 goals and 94 points, tied for second in the league in goal scoring with Jaromír Jágr. At the conclusion of the season, Yashin was at the pinnacle of his career as the runner-up for the Hart Memorial Trophy for the NHL's most valuable player, and named an NHL Second Team All-Star. Yashin's regular season success did not carry over into the 1999 playoffs, and the Senators were swept in the first round by the Buffalo Sabres. Yashin, as the team's captain was expected to be among the team's best players, but went scoreless in the series. Dudley tried to protect his player by claiming that Yashin was only stopped by the league's best goaltender (Dominik Hašek), but fans and journalists had begun to label him as the "invisible man" for his lack of effort in the playoffs.

==== Contract disputes again ====
In the 1999 offseason, the Senators general manager, Rick Dudley, left the team to join the Tampa Bay Lightning organization and Marshall Johnston was hired as his replacement. That summer Yashin's relationship with the Senators reached a new low and he demanded a pay raise threatening not to honour the final year of his contract. When the Senators refused, Yashin demanded a trade on the advice of his agent, Mark Gandler. This was the third time that Yashin demanded a new contract during his five years with the team. Yashin, his agent, and the team, all negotiated through the media, throwing around accusations and ultimatums. Johnston refused to trade Yashin, instead stripping him of his captaincy and issuing it to Daniel Alfredsson. When Yashin still refused to report, the Senators suspended him for the remainder of the 1999–2000 season on 10 November, with the full support of the NHL. The team, through the NHL, sought punitive damages in court. Yashin was also sued by a fan of the Senators, with the lawsuit later being dismissed. After the season, an NHL arbitrator refused to grant Yashin the free agent status he claimed to have earned, instead tolling his contract for another season on the grounds that Yashin owed the Senators the final year of his contract if he ever returned to the NHL. Despite the Senators arbitration victory, the team's owner, Rod Bryden, sued Yashin for damages. The lawsuit was eventually dropped.

Yashin returned to the Senators for the 2000–01 season. He was jeered by the crowd in nearly every NHL arena, especially in Ottawa, and had to fight Florida Panthers' defenceman Todd Simpson on 18 November, who went at Yashin to show him that other players were not happy with his actions. On 21 October 2000, Yashin recorded four assists in a 6–6 tie with the Atlanta Thrashers, and three assists in a 5–3 victory over Philadelphia on 2 December. He recorded his sixth career hat trick on 6 January 2001 in a 4–3 win over the Montreal Canadiens. He notched one more three-point game that season on 1 March in an 8–4 victory over the San Jose Sharks. He finished the season with 40 goals and 88 points in 82 games. The Senators made the playoffs after finishing second in the Eastern Conference and faced the Toronto Maple Leafs in their first-round match up. However, once again Yashin disappeared in the playoffs, recording only one assist as the Senators were swept in four games by the Maple Leafs.

=== New York Islanders (2001–2007) ===
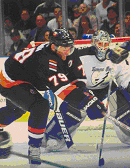
Yashin playing for the New York Islanders

In the 2001 offseason, the New York Islanders were looking to upgrade their first line centre position and had four choices, with the Islanders general manager Mike Milbury choosing to go for one of the two available on the trade market, rather than sign one of the two available as free agents. Yashin and Jason Allison of the Boston Bruins were the trade targets, and Milbury chose to go with Yashin after the Bruins asked for too much in return for Allison. On the day of the 2001 NHL entry draft, Yashin was traded to the New York Islanders in exchange for defenceman Zdeno Chára, forward Bill Muckalt and the second overall pick, which the Senators used to select highly touted centre Jason Spezza. Milbury promptly re-signed Yashin to a ten-year, $87.5 million contract. Although his contract was reduced by 24% due to the new NHL Collective Bargaining Agreement (CBA) signed in 2005, Yashin was widely considered to be grossly overpaid and virtually untradeable.

Yashin made his debut in the 2001–02 season opener on 5 October, a 3–2 victory over the Tampa Bay Lightning. Operating on the first line, flanked by Brad Isbister and Mariusz Czerkawski, in the next game the following day, Yashin recorded his first goal with the Islanders in a 3–0 shutout win over the Florida Panthers. The Islanders started hot to start the season, playing well through October. He marked three-point games on 13 October 27 November, and 7 December. On 12 January 2002, he tallied four assists in a 5–4 victory over the Boston Bruins and then registered his first hat trick with the Islanders in a spirited 6–3 win over their crosstown rivals, the New York Rangers, on 30 January. He was named to the World Team at the 2002 All-Star Game in February. In his first game back with the Islanders following the All-Star break, he marked three points in a 6–6 tie with the Florida Panthers on 4 February. He finished the season with 32 goals and 75 points in 78 games. Yashin's play was generally praised in 2001–02, as he carried the team's offence for stretches during the season. He helped his new team make the playoffs for the first time in eight years in 2002, though the Islanders were still unable to advance beyond the first round. The Isles lost to the Toronto Maple Leafs in a hard-fought seven game series. Yashin registered three goals and seven points in the seven games.

In June 2002, Czerkawski was traded to Montreal and Oleg Kvasha was slotted in on Yashin's line as his permanent replacement for the beginning of the 2002–03 season, having found some success on Yashin's wing the previous season. Yashin recorded three-point games on 24 October and 23 November. The Islanders started off poorly and required interventions by general manager Milbury and head coach Peter Laviolette to correct the team's course. However, the line did not work well, and the Islanders' moved other players onto it, including Mattias Weinhandl, Shawn Bates, and Mark Parrish. Yashin marked a three-point game on 3 January 2003. However, as the season wore on his scoring dried up and commentary about his work ethic began to appear again. However, as the trade deadline passed, the Islanders still sought someone who could play permanently on Yashin's wing unsuccessfully and even traded Isbister away. After Isbister's departure, Aaron Asham was the next forward promoted to Yashin's line. On 20 March, Yashin tied his career high in points in a game, scoring two goals and recording five points in a 6–3 victory over the Montreal Canadiens. He then marked his first career four-goal game in a 9–2 win over the Chicago Blackhawks on 25 March. He finished the regular season with 26 goals and 65 points in 81 games. The Islanders qualified for the 2003 playoffs and faced Yashin's former team, the Ottawa Senators, in the first round. Yashin was excellent in the opening game of the series, a 3–0 victory. However, despite Yashin's play, the Islanders were no match for the Senators and Ottawa won the next four games to eliminate New York. Yashin finished with two goals and four points in the five games.

Yashin and the Islanders faced criticism after their abrupt exit in the playoffs, and head coach Laviolette was fired as a result. A scoring winger to play alongside Yashin was identified as a major need by the franchise ahead of the 2003–04 season. The only forward that fit that description the Islanders were able to acquire was Czerkawski, who they had traded away the season before, and he was returned to Yashin's line in training camp along with Kvasha by new head coach Steve Stirling. Yashin notched a three-point game (all assists) on 25 October in a 7–3 win over the Pittsburgh Penguins. By November, the Islanders' play failed to excite the crowds and attendance began dropping. Islanders' owner Charles Wang had accrued $20 million in losses on the team the season prior and the team's ineffectiveness led many to believe that he would endure another season of losses. This led to rumours that nearly the entire team was available for trade, except for Yashin, whose play under Stirling had improved over the prior season and was the team's lone bright spot. By the end of the month, even Yashin had gone into a scoring drought and the team lost five games in a row. The losing streak stretched to seven before the Islanders turned their play around. Yashin was tied with Czerkawski for the team lead in points when on 23 December, Yashin's right forearm was accidentally cut by a skate blade, which severed tendons and required immediate surgery. He was expected to miss three months for recovery. He returned to the lineup on 9 March 2004 in a 3–2 overtime loss to the St. Louis Blues, playing sparingly. He marked a three-point game on 2 April in a 6—4 win over the Carolina Hurricanes, scoring one goal and assisting on two others. The victory ensured the Islanders qualified for the playoffs. Yashin finished the regular season with 15 goals and 34 points in 47 games. The Islanders faced the Tampa Bay Lightning in the first round, but were no match for Martin St. Louis and Nikolai Khabibulin as New York was eliminated in five games. Yashin recorded one assist in the series.

==== 2004–05 lockout and Russia ====
Ahead of the 2004–05 NHL season, the players were locked out by the owners and the season was eventually cancelled on 16 February 2005. During negotiations, large NHL contracts, such as the one Yashin had signed, were targeted for reductions. Just ahead of the cancellation, Yashin signed a short-term deal with Lokomotiv Yaroslavl of the Russian Superleague in February which included an out clause for the NHL if play returned. Yashin appeared in ten regular season games for Lokomotiv, scoring three goals and six points. Lokomotiv qualified for the playoffs, knocking off the powerhouse Ak Bars Kazan in the first round, before ultimately being eliminated and winning the bronze medal. In nine playoff games, Yashin scored three goals and ten points.

==== Return to NHL ====
The lockout ended on 21 July 2005 and one of the new regulations that was implemented prevented players from holding out mid-contract, a direct result of Yashin's behaviour earlier in his career. Prior to the 2005–06 season, the Islanders lost several key players to free agency or retirement and significantly retooled their roster. Captain Michael Peca was traded to free up room to sign free agents such as high-scoring wing Miroslav Šatan and Yashin became team captain. Šatan was the scoring winger the franchise had sought to pair with Yashin and along with rookie Robert Nilsson, formed the team's top line. Yashin recorded two goals and three points on 25 October against the Atlanta Thrashers and then one goal and three points on 29 October against the Buffalo Sabres. However, Nilsson's time on the top line was short-lived, as Asham and Kvasha both saw time, with Kvasha even taking Yashin's spot at centre and Yashin lining up on the left. Yashin's play once again became uninspired and he was benched by Stirling in consecutive games in early January 2006. Stirling lasted until 13 January when he was fired and replaced in the interim by Brad Shaw. Shaw immediately moved Šatan off Yashin's line and the Islanders won their game that night 3–2 over the Calgary Flames. Yashin recorded his 400th career assist in a 4–3 shootout victory over the Pittsburgh Penguins on 26 January. Šatan's season improved after being moved off Yashin's line and Kvasha was traded away at the trade deadline. Other players, such as Jeff Tambellini and Sean Bergenheim, ended up on his line. Yashin recorded a three-point game on 14 March, and then again on 25 March, and a two-goal, four-point night on 8 April. Despite tying the team lead for scoring with 28 goals and 66 points, Yashin was met my boos from the fans. After the season ended with the Islanders out of the playoffs for the first time since his arrival, Yashin acknowledged that he needed to score more. There was also speculation that the Islanders would buy out his contract and rebuild in a different image, but the team decided to retain him.

An October 2006 article in Newsday suggested that Yashin must "make a difference" in 2006–07 or he will be bought out at the end of the season. New head coach, Ted Nolan, began the season playing Yashin on the right wing, with Mike Sillinger at centre and Viktor Kozlov on the opposite side. That did not last long and early in the season, Yashin was back centreing his own line, with Kozlov and Andy Hilbert flanking him. On 19 October, he recorded a three-point game followed up by a four-point effort on 21 October and another three-point match on 2 November. By the 20-game mark, Yashin was earning praise in the local media for the first time in recent memory, and his point totals were among the league leaders. Jason Blake was placed on Yashin's line and went on a scoring tear. However, on 25 November, Yashin suffered a knee sprain after taking a knee-to-knee hit. He initially returned after a few weeks, but his effectiveness was reduced, and the team revealed that the knee was not 100%. Early in February, Nolan decided to rest Yashin until his knee was completely healthy, which prompted questions about whether the team still had faith in Yashin and whether the re-injury was legitimate or a pretext for benching him. He returned full time after missing 16 games on 8 March 2007. However, Nolan found his immediate play poor and Yashin was demoted to the fourth line. He recorded 13 points (five goals and eight assists) in 16 games which helped the Islanders clinch the eighth and final playoff berth in the Eastern Conference. In the first round series against the Buffalo Sabres, Yashin registered no points in five games and at times was demoted to the fourth line by Nolan. The Islanders decided to buy-out the remainder of Yashin's contract in June 2007, according to a report in Newsday. The contract was bought-out for $17.63 million, or two-thirds of the amount left on the contract, to be paid out over eight years at a rate of $2.2 million per year.

=== Return to Russia (2007–2012) ===
Perhaps surprisingly, Yashin's agent, Mark Gandler, claimed that Yashin was keen on a return to Ottawa once his contract had been bought-out by the Islanders. "It's a new chapter and we'll be calling Ottawa for sure," Gandler was quoted in the Ottawa Sun as saying, adding, "He'd love to return to Ottawa, in fact." However, the Senators showed little to no interest in bringing Yashin back into the fold, and Gandler was subsequently "not happy with" contract offers from various NHL teams, resulting in threats of his client returning to Russia to resume his hockey career. On 20 July 2007, Yashin signed a one-year contract with Lokomotiv Yaroslavl of the Russian Superleague (RSL). In the 2007–08 season Lokomotiv advanced to the league playoff final facing the regular season leaders, Salavat Yulaev Ufa, where they lost. In 56 games, Yashin scored 16 goals and 43 points, leading his team in scoring and in 16 playoff games, recorded eight goals and 14 points, leading his team in playoff scoring. He was awarded the Russian SuperLeague's Most Valuable Player Award in 2008.

Ahead of the 2008–09 season, the RSL was replaced by the Kontinental Hockey League (KHL) as Russia's premiere hockey league. He made his KHL debut on 2 September 2008 against Salavat Yulaev Ufa and marked his first KHL goal on 6 September against Metallurg Magnitogorsk. As one the league's biggest stars, Yashin headlined his own all-star team at the league's inaugural all-star game, facing off against Jaromír Jágr's team. Lokomotiv advanced to the Gagarin Cup final against Ak Bars, losing in the final game. Yashin again led Lokomotiv in both regular season scoring with 21 goals and 47 points in 56 games and in the playoffs, with seven goals and 18 points in 19 games. On 29 May 2009, Yashin officially signed with SKA Saint Petersburg of the KHL. Playing on a line with Maxim Sushinsky and Petr Čajánek, he recorded 18 goals and 64 points in 56 games in the 2009–10 season. However, in the playoffs, St. Petersburg faltered and were knocked out in the first round. Yashin scored two goals and three points in the four games. The following season in 2010–11, the line was broken up and Yashin's production dipped, scoring 15 goals and 33 points. Yashin, along with Maxim Afinogenov, led St. Petersburg to a Spengler Cup victory over Canada on 31 December 2010. There were some distractions during the season, as Yashin became embroiled in a contract dispute of his St. Petersburg teammate Evgeni Nabokov and his former NHL team, the New York Islanders. Yashin advised the Islanders to claim Nabokov off waivers from the Detroit Red Wings, but Nabokov refused to report to New York and instead joined Yashin in Russia to start the season. However, SKA's playoff ambitions were ended early, as the team was eliminated in the second round. Yashin finished the playoffs with one goal and five points in four games. SKA chose not renew Yashin's contract after the season.

In the 2011 offseason, the New York Islanders and Yashin discussed the possibility of Yashin returning to play for the team in the 2011–12 season. Ultimately, the two sides failed to come to terms and Yashin subsequently signed a one-year deal with CSKA Moscow for the 2011–12 season. He made 43 appearances for CSKA, scoring nine goals and 20 points. Following the 2011–12 season, Yashin retired.

== Management career ==
In December 2012, Russian Hockey Federation president Vladislav Tretiak appointed Yashin as the general manager of the Russia women's national ice hockey team. After his tenure as the general manager ended, he was named an assistant coach of the Russian men's national team on 23 August 2013.

== International play ==
Medal record

Ice hockey

Representing Russia

Olympic Games
Silver medal – second place	1998 Nagano	
Bronze medal – third place	2002 Salt Lake City	

World Championships
Gold medal – first place	1993 Germany	
Bronze medal – third place	2005 Austria	

European Junior Championship
Silver medal – second place	1991 Czechoslovakia	

Representing CIS

World Junior Championship
Gold medal – first place	1992 Germany	

Yashin made his international debut with the CIS national ice hockey team in 1992, a multi-national successor team to the preceding Soviet team that appeared after the collapse of the Soviet Union in 1991 at the World Junior Championships. The team also included Alexei Kovalev and Nikolai Khabibulin of Russia, Darius Kasparaitis of Lithuania, Alexei Zhitnik of Ukraine, and Sandis Ozoliņš of Latvia. The CIS team won the tournament gold medal. Following the World Juniors, the CIS team was disbanded and each player would represent their new nation in future tournaments.

Yashin was an exception to a general rule that Russian players in the NHL would not play for the national team in the 1990s. Yashin only missed three international tournaments in his career. Yashin represented his native Russia at the 1996 and 2004 World Cup of Hockey, the 1998, 2002, and 2006 Winter Olympics, and at nine World Championships. He was named the national team captain at the 1996 World Cup, the 1999 World Championships, and the 2001 World Championships. In his international career he won the World Championship gold medal in 1993 and the bronze medal in 2005, Olympic silver in 1998 and bronze in 2002.

He was inducted into the IIHF Hall of Fame in 2020. The induction ceremony was scheduled during the 2020 IIHF World Championship, but was delayed due to the COVID-19 pandemic. The IIHF Hall of Fame class of 2020/2022 was inducted during the 2022 IIHF World Championship.

== Personal life ==
Yashin was born in Sverdlovsk, Soviet Union (now Yekaterinburg, Russia) to parents Valeri and Tatiana. Valeri was a university professor specializing in forest ecology and Tatiana, an electrical engineer. He also has one brother, Dima. Yashin was previously in a long-term relationship with actress and former model Carol Alt until 2019.

== Career statistics ==
=== Regular season and playoffs ===
			Regular season					Playoffs
Season	Team	League	GP	G	A	Pts	PIM	GP	G	A	Pts	PIM
1990–91	Avtomobilist Sverdlovsk	USSR	26	2	1	3	10	—	—	—	—	—
1991–92	Dynamo Moscow	USSR	28	7	3	10	19	7	0	2	2	0
1992–93	Dynamo Moscow	RUS	27	10	12	22	18	10	7	3	10	18
1993–94	Ottawa Senators	NHL	83	30	49	79	22	—	—	—	—	—
1994–95	Las Vegas Thunder	IHL	24	15	20	35	32	—	—	—	—	—
1994–95	Ottawa Senators	NHL	47	21	23	44	20	—	—	—	—	—
1995–96	CSKA Moscow	RUS	4	2	2	4	4	—	—	—	—	—
1995–96	Ottawa Senators	NHL	46	15	24	39	28	—	—	—	—	—
1996–97	Ottawa Senators	NHL	82	35	40	75	44	7	1	5	6	2
1997–98	Ottawa Senators	NHL	82	33	39	72	24	11	5	3	8	8
1998–99	Ottawa Senators	NHL	82	44	50	94	54	4	0	0	0	10
2000–01	Ottawa Senators	NHL	82	40	48	88	30	4	0	1	1	0
2001–02	New York Islanders	NHL	78	32	43	75	25	7	3	4	7	2
2002–03	New York Islanders	NHL	81	26	39	65	32	5	2	2	4	2
2003–04	New York Islanders	NHL	47	15	19	34	10	5	0	1	1	0
2004–05	Lokomotiv Yaroslavl	RSL	10	3	3	6	14	9	3	7	10	10
2005–06	New York Islanders	NHL	82	28	38	66	68	—	—	—	—	—
2006–07	New York Islanders	NHL	58	18	32	50	44	5	0	0	0	0
2007–08	Lokomotiv Yaroslavl	RSL	56	16	27	43	63	16	8	6	14	16
2008–09	Lokomotiv Yaroslavl	KHL	56	21	26	47	30	19	7	11	18	10
2009–10	SKA Saint Petersburg	KHL	56	18	46	64	38	4	2	1	3	0
2010–11	SKA Saint Petersburg	KHL	52	15	18	33	50	4	1	4	5	0
2011–12	CSKA Moscow	KHL	43	9	11	20	18	3	1	0	1	0
NHL totals			850	337	444	781	401	48	11	16	27	24
KHL totals			207	63	101	164	136	30	11	16	27	10

=== International ===
Year	Team	Event	GP	G	A	Pts	PIM
1991	Soviet Union	EJC	6	2	3	5	2
1992	CIS	WJC	7	4	2	6	2
1993	Russia	WJC	3	1	0	1	4
1993	Russia	WC	8	2	1	3	5
1994	Russia	WC	1	2	3	8
1996	Russia	WC	8	4	5	9	4
1996	Russia	WCH	5	2	2	6
1997	Russia	WC	5	3	0	3	12
1998	Russia	OLY	6	3	3	6	0
1999	Russia	WC	6	8	1	9	6
2000	Russia	WC	5	1	1	2	8
2001	Russia	WC	7	2	3	5	6
2002	Russia	OLY	6	1	1	2	0
2004	Russia	WC	6	1	2	3	2
2004	Russia	WCH	4	1	2	3	4
2005	Russia	WC	9	2	1	3	8
2006	Russia	OLY	8	1	3	4	4
Junior totals			16	7	5	12	8
Senior totals			88	30	27	57	73

== Awards and honors ==
Award	Year
International
IIHF Hall of Fame	2020
NHL
All-Star Game	1994, 1999, 2002
Second All-Star Team	1999
KHL
All-Star Game	2009, 2010, 2011

== Sources ==
- Botte, Peter; Hahn, Alan (2002). Fish Sticks: The Fall and Rise of the New York Islanders. Sports Publishing LLC. ISBN 1-58261-664-7.
- Carroll, M. R. (2001). The concise encyclopedia of hockey. Vancouver, British Columbia: Greystone Books. ISBN 1-55054-845-X.
- Duhatschek, Eric; Frayne, Trent; Hornby, Lance; Miller, Gord; Strachan, Al (2000). Hockey Chronicles: An Insider History of National Hockey League Teams. Toronto: Key Porter Books. ISBN 1-55263-387-X.
- Kennedy, Ryan, ed. (2010). Blood Feuds: Hockey's Best-Ever Rivalries. Montreal: Transcontinental Books. ISBN 978-0-9813938-1-0.
- MacGregor, Roy (1993). Road Games: A Year in the Life of the NHL. Toronto: MacFarlane Walter & Ross. ISBN 0-921912-70-6.
- MacGregor, Roy (1995). The Home Team: Fathers, Sons & Hockey. Toronto: Viking. ISBN 0-670-85881-1.
- Podnieks, Andrew (1998). Red, White, and Gold: Canada at the World Junior Championships 1974–1999. Toronto: ECW Press. ISBN 1-55022-382-8.
- Robinson, Chris (2004). Ottawa Senators: Great Stories from the NHL's First Dynasty. Amazing Stories. Canmore, Alberta: Altitude Publishing. ISBN 1-55153-790-7.

Awards and achievements
Preceded by none	Ottawa Senators first-round draft pick 1992	Succeeded by Alexandre Daigle
Sporting positions
Preceded by Randy Cunneyworth	Ottawa Senators captain 1998–99	Succeeded by Daniel Alfredsson
Preceded by Michael Peca	New York Islanders captain 2005–07	Succeeded by Bill Guerin
