= Randy Sexton =

Canadian ice hockey manager

- Born: July 24, 1959 (age 67); Brockville, Ontario, Canada
- Education: St. Lawrence University, Clarkson University
- Occupations: Senior Advisor to the General Manager, Minnesota Wild

Randy Sexton (born July 24, 1959) is a Canadian ice hockey executive, businessman and former athlete. He is the Senior Advisor to the General Manager for the Minnesota Wild. He was the assistant general manager for the Buffalo Sabres of the National Hockey League (NHL) and general manager of the Rochester Americans of the American Hockey League from 2017 to 2020. Prior to that, he was the director of amateur scouting for the Pittsburgh Penguins and general manager of the Ottawa Senators and the Florida Panthers of the NHL. He was also one of the founders of the Ottawa Senators NHL club in Ottawa, Ontario.

== Career ==
Born in Brockville, Ontario, Randy Sexton attended St. Lawrence University from 1978 until 1982 on a hockey scholarship after playing for the Cornwall Royals. He served as team captain during his final two seasons, earning awards including All-American honors, Senior Male Athlete of the Year, Most Valuable Player and the Brian P. Doyle Leadership Award. From 1983 to 1985 he served as an assistant coach with St. Lawrence, while also handling scouting and recruiting responsibilities. He later earned a master's degree in business administration (MBA) from Clarkson University.

In 1989, Sexton was vice-president of Terrace Investments, a commercial development firm in Ottawa. Bruce Firestone, then president & CEO, developed the idea of reviving NHL hockey in Ottawa, adopting for the club the old Ottawa Senators name. In the original plan, their privately financed arena would anchor a new 'West Terrace' 'mini-city' land development in Kanata, Ontario on class "A" farmland. Sexton, along with Firestone and Cyril Leeder were the principal persons behind the successful drive to win a new NHL franchise in 1990.

Sexton would later be named general manager by majority owner Rod Bryden in 1993 and served until 1995. He was Ottawa's general manager at the 1993 NHL entry draft where he selected Alexandre Daigle. He would sign Daigle to a record-breaking salary for a rookie. The contract would lead the league to put restrictions on rookie contracts. He was fired in December 1995 due to the poor performance of the hockey club in the 1995–96 season.

Sexton then turned to sports marketing with the firm Capital Sports Management, which provided strategic advice to the Senators. When the Senators built the Bell Sensplex ice rink facility in 2004, he was named executive director.

On January 27, 2007, Sexton was hired as the assistant general manager of the Florida Panthers, serving under then-general manager Jacques Martin, the former head coach of the Ottawa Senators. His responsibilities included overseeing scouting operations, player development, hockey administration and contract negotiations. Sexton was appointed the Panthers' general manager on October 2, 2009, after Jacques Martin resigned to become the head coach of the Montreal Canadiens.

Sexton was replaced by former Chicago Blackhawks general manager Dale Tallon after a disappointing 2009–10 season. On July 3, 2010, Sexton was hired by the Pittsburgh Penguins as an assistant director of amateur scouting. From 2013, he served as the Penguins' co-director of amateur scouting until he was elevated to the position of sole director of amateur scouting in 2015. In 2017 he was named assistant general manager of the Buffalo Sabres and general manager of the Rochester Americans. On June 16, 2020, he was fired from the Buffalo Sabres. On January 1, 2021, Sexton was hired to the Minnesota Wild as the team's Senior Advisor to the General Manager.

== Personal life ==
Sexton's son, Ben, played for the Bruins, Penguins, and Senators organizations and is now an assistant coach with the Senators. Sexton's younger son, Patrick, played NCAA hockey for the University of Wisconsin from 2015 to 2017.

== Awards ==
- 2012 - Ottawa Sports Hall of Fame

== See also ==
- Ottawa Senators
- Bruce Firestone

Preceded by Mel Bridgman	General Manager of the Ottawa Senators; 1993–1995	Succeeded by Pierre Gauthier
Preceded by Jacques Martin	General Manager of the Florida Panthers; 2009–10	Succeeded by Dale Tallon
