= Exploriem =

- Formation: 2001
- Type: Entrepreneur organization based in Canada
- Legal status: active
- Purpose: advocate and public voice, educator and network
- Headquarters: Ottawa, Ontario, Canada
- Region served: Canada
- Official language: English, French
- Website: Exploriem

Exploriem is an incorporated, registered not-for-profit incubator based in Ottawa, Ontario, Canada, aimed at supporting professional entrepreneurs, intrapreneurs, and artpreneurs.

== History and overview ==
Exploriem was founded in 2001, and incorporated in 2004, by Professor Bruce M. Firestone, Todd Jamieson and Professor John Callahan of the Sprott School of Business at Carleton University. For the first eight years of its existence, Exploriem focused on teaching, mentoring, hosting a speaker series and other events including the Annual Bootstrap Award. The awards' focus is on self-capitalized companies and early-stage companies that rely on building real cash flow.

Exploriem provides tools intended to assist entrepreneurs, including an online "Entrepreneurialist Culture Quotient Test" and a business model generator. Exploriem provides a monthly internet radio show for entrepreneurs, intrapreneurs and artpreneurs. The organization partners with outside organizations such as Invest Ottawa and Lead to Win.

== Directors ==
- Dr. Bruce M. Firestone, Executive Director, is the founder of the Ottawa Senators ice hockey team, Scotiabank Place, and the Ottawa Senators Foundation. Firestone is the Entrepreneurship ambassador at Ottawa'sUniversity of Ottawa’s Telfer School of Management.
- Todd Jamieson is founder and president of EnvisionOnline.ca and founding member of Ottawa Web Marketing Club.
