= Ben Sexton (ice hockey) =

Canadian ice hockey player (born 1991)

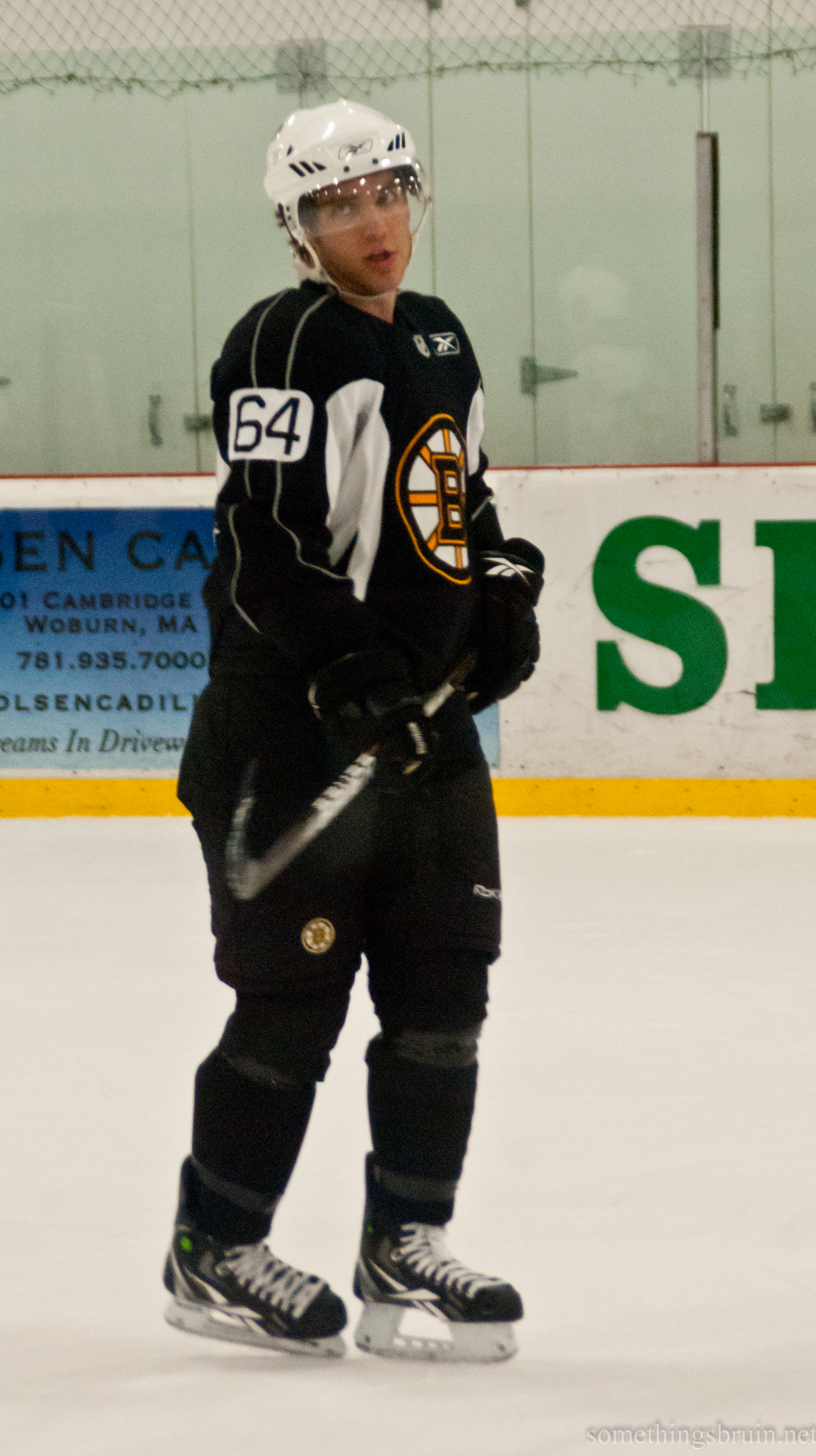
- Sexton in 2011
- Born: June 6, 1991 (age 35) Ottawa, Ontario, Canada
- Height: 5 ft 11 in (180 cm)
- Weight: 196 lb (89 kg; 14 st 0 lb)
- Position: Centre
- Shot: Right
- Played for: Ottawa Senators
- NHL draft: 206th overall, 2009; Boston Bruins
- Playing career: 2013–2020

Ben Sexton (born June 6, 1991) is a Canadian professional ice hockey coach and former player. Sexton is currently an assistant coach with the Ottawa Senators of the National Hockey League (NHL), whom he also played for. A centre, he was selected by the Boston Bruins in the seventh round, 206th overall, of the 2009 NHL entry draft. Sexton is the son of one of the Ottawa Senators' founding partners, Randy Sexton.

== Playing career ==
=== Collegiate ===
Sexton played four years at Clarkson University. In his junior year, Sexton was named team captain and was named to the ECAC Hockey All-Academic team. He was also awarded Clarkson's Mike Morrison Dedication Award and Clarkson Ironman Award. The following season, again serving as captain, Sexton was named to the ECAC Hockey All-Academic team for the second year in a row.

=== Professional ===
On March 20, 2014, Sexton signed an entry-level contract with the Boston Bruins and was subsequently assigned to their American Hockey League affiliate, the Providence Bruins.

On July 1, 2017, Sexton signed a two-year, two-way contract with the Ottawa Senators. Sexton was assigned to the Senators' American Hockey League affiliate, the Belleville Senators, after training camp. Sexton received a call-up in March 2018 and played his first NHL game on March 26, 2018, against the Carolina Hurricanes. He was reassigned to the AHL a game later. After the season, Sexton was Belleville's nominee for the Yanick Dupre Memorial Award as AHL man of the year.

On December 5, Sexton and Macoy Erkamps were traded to the Pittsburgh Penguins in exchange for Stefan Elliott and Tobias Lindberg. Reassigned to AHL affiliate, the Wilkes-Barre/Scranton Penguins, Sexton appeared in 26 games, accruing seven goals and three assists for 10 points.

As a free agent from the Pittsburgh Penguins, Sexton opted to remain within the organization by continuing with Wilkes-Barre/Scranton on a one-year AHL contract on July 11, 2019.

Having missed the entirety of the 2019–20 season due to a concussion injury, Sexton announced his retirement after seven professional seasons on May 9, 2020.

== Personal life ==
Sexton comes from a family of hockey players; his father is one of the Ottawa Senators' founding partners, Randy Sexton. His younger brother Patrick played NCAA hockey for the University of Wisconsin from 2015–2017.

== Career statistics ==
			Regular season					Playoffs
Season	Team	League	GP	G	A	Pts	PIM	GP	G	A	Pts	PIM
2007–08	Nepean Raiders	CCHL	48	15	15	30	71	6	1	5	6	4
2008–09	Nepean Raiders	CCHL	38	14	21	35	54	11	3	9	12	22
2009–10	Penticton Vees	BCHL	50	13	29	42	83	5	1	2	3	4
2010–11	Clarkson University	ECAC	12	3	5	8	12	—	—	—	—	—
2011–12	Clarkson University	ECAC	27	8	21	29	44	—	—	—	—	—
2012–13	Clarkson University	ECAC	28	5	15	20	70	—	—	—	—	—
2013–14	Clarkson University	ECAC	35	6	22	28	88	—	—	—	—	—
2013–14	Providence Bruins	AHL	9	1	1	2	9	—	—	—	—	—
2014–15	Providence Bruins	AHL	35	3	9	12	57	5	0	0	0	2
2015–16	Providence Bruins	AHL	29	4	1	5	45	1	0	0	0	2
2016–17	Albany Devils	AHL	54	19	12	31	60	4	0	2	2	0
2017–18	Belleville Senators	AHL	30	10	11	21	16	—	—	—	—	—
2017–18	Ottawa Senators	NHL	2	0	0	0	0	—	—	—	—	—
2018–19	Belleville Senators	AHL	17	0	9	9	16	—	—	—	—	—
2018–19	Wilkes-Barre/Scranton Penguins	AHL	26	7	3	10	31	—	—	—	—	—
NHL totals			2	0	0	0	0	—	—	—	—	—
