= Bruce Firestone =

Canadian businessman

- Born: 4 December 1951 (age 74); Ottawa, Ontario
- Education: Ashbury College ('67); McGill University (BEng 1972); University of New South Wales (MEng 1976); Australian National University (PhD 1982)
- Spouse: Dawn Marie MacMillan (m. 1990)

Bruce Murray Firestone (born 4 December 1951) of Ottawa, Ontario, is a Canadian businessman and writer. He is the founder of the modern-day Ottawa Senators NHL professional ice hockey club and former part-owner of the Ottawa Rough Riders CFL football club.

== Education ==
Firestone graduated from Ashbury College in 1967. Dr. Firestone received his Bachelor of Civil Engineering degree from McGill University in Montreal, Canada; his Master of Engineering-Science (Traffic and Transportation) from the University of New South Wales in Sydney, Australia; and his PhD in Urban Economics from the Australian National University in Canberra, Australia.

== Business career ==
After graduating from the universities in Australia, Firestone joined the family firm Terrace Developments in the early 1980s. Along with developing commercial properties, Firestone also launched the publication of the Ottawa Business News (now Ottawa Business Journal) and established the construction of several buildings in the Ottawa CBD and in Bells Corners.

When the NHL announced that it was interested in expanding in the late 1980s, Firestone, then president of Terrace Investments, formed an organization to win an NHL franchise for Ottawa. Firestone's vision was to use the club as the centerpiece of a new commercial development to the west of the City of Ottawa. A new arena would be built, increasing land values in the surrounding area to the point where the expected franchise fee of $30 million US dollars (it would actually be $50 million) could be raised through land sales and commercial development fees and profits. Firestone's group was successful in winning a new franchise, along with the Tampa Bay Lightning, on condition that the franchise would build a new arena to NHL standards.

The arena location, on undeveloped farmland, was controversial and opposition grew against the paving over of the farmland. Eventually, the government agency responsible for local development allowed the development of the arena but not the surrounding lands. As well, as part of the development agreement for the new arena, then known as the Palladium (now the Canadian Tire Centre), the Government of Ontario required that the corporation pay for all of the required infrastructure, including a freeway interchange. These conditions led to the search for new financing. The search led to the turnover of the ownership of the Ottawa Senators to a partnership led by Rod Bryden. Bryden was able to arrange financing of the development through a partnership with Ogden Entertainment and Bruce left to allow the franchise to continue.

After leaving the Senators organization, Firestone became chairman and part-owner of the Ottawa Rough Riders Canadian Football League football team. After one year with the organization it was sold to Horn Chen and Firestone returned to real estate development.

In 2004, Firestone founded Exploriem.org, a registered Canadian Not-For-Profit Professional Entrepreneurs and Intrapreneurs Organization. He is the executive director of the organization which helps entrepreneurs and start-ups get a foothold in the local business community through business model competitions, funding, mentoring, and providing free office space. Exploriem is also partnered with OCRI (Ottawa Centre for Research and Innovation), Algonquin College, Lead to Win and others within the Ottawa business community.

Firestone was an entrepreneur-in-residence at the Telfer School of Management at the University of Ottawa and is a commercial real estate agent. As well he has written the Entrepreneurs Handbook which is a guide to help entrepreneurs get started using the bootstrap method and starting with a good business model as well publishing a memoir; "Don’t Back Down: The Real Story of the Foundling of the NHL’s Ottawa Senators and Why Big Leagues Matter" in 2015 to celebrate the 25th anniversary of the NHL team's founding, of presenting the team's proposal to the NHL’s Board of Governors in Palm Beach, Florida.

== Personal life ==
Firestone has five children with wife Dawn Macmillan.

== Awards ==
- 2012 - Ottawa Sports Hall of Fame

== See also ==
- Ottawa Rough Riders
- Exploriem
- Ottawa Senators
- Cyril Leeder
- Randy Sexton

Sporting positions
New creation	Ottawa Senators owner 1990–1993	Succeeded by Rod Bryden
