= Alexandre Daigle =

Canadian ice hockey player (born 1975)

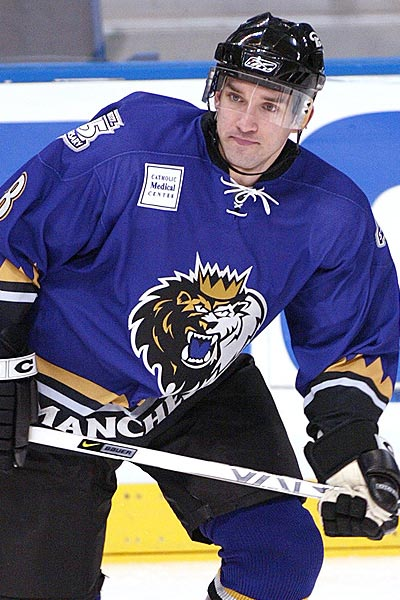
- Daigle with the Manchester Monarchs in 2006
- Born: February 7, 1975 (age 51) Laval, Quebec, Canada
- Height: 6 ft 0 in (183 cm)
- Weight: 195 lb (88 kg; 13 st 13 lb)
- Position: Centre
- Shot: Left
- Played for: Ottawa Senators; Philadelphia Flyers; Tampa Bay Lightning; New York Rangers; Pittsburgh Penguins; Minnesota Wild; Davos; Fribourg-Gottéron; SCL Tigers
- NHL draft: 1st overall, 1993; Ottawa Senators
- Playing career: 1993–2000; 2002–2010

Alexandre Daigle (born February 7, 1975) is a Canadian former professional ice hockey player. A highly touted junior prospect, Daigle was drafted first overall in the 1993 NHL entry draft by the Ottawa Senators. After recording a modest career high of 51 points in three separate National Hockey League (NHL) regular seasons, Daigle briefly retired from hockey at age 25 but returned to the NHL two years later. Although he played ten seasons in the NHL and four in the Swiss NL, he failed to live up to the high expectations put forth when he was drafted first overall and is therefore regarded by many to have been a draft bust.

== Playing career ==
=== Amateur career ===
As a youth, Daigle played in the 1988 Quebec International Pee-Wee Hockey Tournament with a minor ice hockey team from Laval, Quebec.

=== NHL career ===
Leading up to the 1993 NHL entry draft, Daigle was considered a "can't miss" prospect, an NHL superstar-in-waiting, and a big draw for the expansion Senators. The Senators were even accused of deliberately losing games late in the 1992–93 season, their first in the NHL, to guarantee the first overall selection and the right to draft him. This prompted an investigation by the NHL, which soon implemented a draft lottery to prevent such things from happening again. The Senators subsequently finished last place overall in the 1992–93 league standings, thus securing the rights to the first overall pick.

As the draft approached, the Quebec Nordiques, who were hosting the event, were reportedly so eager to draft the next Quebecois superstar that they were rumored to have offered star players such as Owen Nolan, Ron Hextall, and draft picks, but Ottawa management disregarded all offers. The Senators selected Daigle first overall, ahead of future Hall-of-Famers Chris Pronger and Paul Kariya. He subsequently received the largest starting salary in league history (five years, $12.25 million), leading to the introduction of a rookie salary cap a few years later. Regarding his draft position, Daigle uttered the now infamous comment, "I'm glad I got drafted first, because no one remembers number two". Pronger, selected with the second pick by the Hartford Whalers, would later be elected to the Hockey Hall of Fame.

Daigle initially seemed destined to live up to the pre-draft hype, scoring 20 goals and 51 points in a rookie season in which he had little offensive support, and his 37 points in the lockout-shortened 1994-95 season had him on pace for 28 goals and 66 points in an 84-game schedule. However, he was never able to reproduce his junior dominance, and the superstardom the Senators and the league had hoped for never materialized. He scored 20 or more goals twice – in his rookie year and in 1996–97, never registering more than 26 goals in a season. He was frequently criticized for lack of effort and motivation, with his lucrative long-term contract perhaps partially to blame. He seemed interested in the limelight, appearing in a full-page ad dressed in a nurse's uniform.

Russian center Alexei Yashin outplayed Daigle in every season that they were teammates in Ottawa. Both entered the league in the 1993–94 season and were promoted as future stars of the franchise, displayed on the cover of the Senators' yearbook and media guide. Management, however, supported Daigle over Yashin, touting him over Yashin for the Calder Memorial Trophy (though Yashin ended up receiving a nomination instead of Daigle). After management continued to support Daigle despite his subpar performance, an angered Yashin held out in the 1995–96 season unless his contract was renegotiated to pay him at a level similar to Daigle's. Head coach Rick Bowness and assistant coach Alain Vigneault were fired on November 21, 1995 in the midst of a losing streak.

On September 25, 1996, Daigle was removed from a team flight when, while chatting with a flight attendant aboard USAir Flight 1948, he leaned over to Trevor Timmins (then the Senators' Director Of Team Services) and said, "Watch out for your bomb there" while motioning towards Timmins' laptop computer. Upon hearing Daigle's comment, the flight attendant notified the captain, who immediately contacted USAir ground control, and police were subsequently notified. What Daigle did not know was that then-U.S. President Bill Clinton was also on the Pittsburgh International Airport's tarmac at the time, resulting in a heightened level of security. Daigle was not prosecuted for the incident, but was fined $300 and barred from boarding the connecting flight to Tampa with the rest of the team.

During the 1997–98 season, after four and a half seasons, 74 goals, and 172 points in 301 games played, Ottawa finally soured on Daigle and traded him to the Philadelphia Flyers in exchange for prospect Václav Prospal and another first-round bust, Pat Falloon. With the Flyers, Daigle scored 31 points in 68 games. In January 1999, Philadelphia traded Daigle to the Edmonton Oilers, who later that same day traded him to the Tampa Bay Lightning for Alexander Selivanov. Daigle played only 32 games for the Lightning, collecting six goals and six assists for 12 points. The New York Rangers then acquired Daigle as a reclamation project, sending cash to the Lightning, but they too realized the one-time junior superstar was not living up to expectations and waived him at the end of the season. In 58 games with the Rangers, Daigle recorded just 8 goals and 18 assists for 26 points.

Daigle found himself out of hockey by the age of 25. No one was willing to take a chance on the under-achiever, and in fact, Daigle admitted he had no desire to play the game anymore. In an interview on Radio-Canada, he said he never wanted to play hockey but stuck to the game because of his talent. Instead, he became interested in the entertainment business and the opportunity to be a celebrity. He played hockey in a small league in Los Angeles with Cuba Gooding Jr. on Jerry Bruckheimer's team, the Bad Boys, and created an event promotion company, Impostor Entertainment, with former Montreal Expos pitcher Derek Aucoin. Their first project was a concert featuring Sheryl Crow during the Canadian Grand Prix Formula One auto race in Montreal.

Following a two-year absence from hockey and in need of a steady paycheck, Daigle decided to attempt an NHL comeback. In mid-2002, he contacted numerous teams looking for an invitation to training camp, ultimately signing with the Pittsburgh Penguins. Daigle would lead the Penguins in pre-season scoring, earning himself a spot on the Pittsburgh roster to start the season. Despite his impressive training camp, Daigle was unable to continue his success into the regular season, ultimately spending the better part of the season with the team's AHL affiliate in Wilkes-Barre/Scranton. After his contract was not renewed by the Penguins, Daigle signed as a free agent with the Minnesota Wild in the offseason.

After arriving in Minnesota, Daigle impressed the Wild coaching staff enough to earn a roster spot for opening night. For the 2003–04 season, Daigle managed to match his career-high point total, finishing the campaign with 51 points (20 goals and 31 assists) to lead the team in scoring. During this season, he was also the Wild's nominee for the Bill Masterton Memorial Trophy, given annually to an NHL player who best exemplifies the qualities of perseverance, sportsmanship, and dedication to hockey. On March 6, 2006, Minnesota waived Daigle and reassigned him to the team's AHL affiliate, the Houston Aeros. Daigle did not play a game for the Aeros and was subsequently loaned to the AHL's Manchester Monarchs on March 13, 2006, in exchange for forward Brendan Bernakevitch.

=== Post NHL-career ===
Aware that his NHL career was over, Daigle set his sights on Europe. On May 5, 2006, he signed a two-year contract with Davos, a top team in the Swiss National League A, and inked a two-year extension with them in December. During his three complete seasons playing in Davos, the team won the league championship on two occasions. In a little over three seasons with Davos, Daigle played 137 games, tallying 46 goals and 94 assists for 140 points (averaging a little over one point per game).

On October 26, 2009, Daigle was loaned to the SCL Tigers in exchange for Oliver Setzinger. Daigle played 25 games with the SCL Tigers in the 2009–10 season, with 7 goals and 17 assists for 24 points. Daigle ranked seventh on the team in points while playing in fewer than half as many games as the team's other top scorers.

On March 23, 2010, Daigle and Davos agreed to have his contract reduced from five years to three years, making him a free agent after the 2009–10 season.

== Post-playing career ==
Since the completion of his European hockey career, Daigle has worked in the movie industry, running studios for MTL Grandé.

Daigle's career was the subject of the 2024 documentary Chosen One: Alexandre Daigle, in which he spoke about his struggles with mental burnout and his failure to live up to the expectations put on him.

== Personal life ==
Daigle lives in Montreal with his wife and their three children.

== Career statistics ==
=== Regular season and playoffs ===
			Regular season					Playoffs
Season	Team	League	GP	G	A	Pts	PIM	GP	G	A	Pts	PIM
1990–91	Laval Régents	QMAAA	42	50	60	110	98	13	5	9	14	23
1991–92	Victoriaville Tigres	QMJHL	66	35	75	110	63	—	—	—	—	—
1992–93	Victoriaville Tigres	QMJHL	53	45	92	137	85	6	5	6	11	4
1993–94	Ottawa Senators	NHL	84	20	31	51	40	—	—	—	—	—
1994–95	Victoriaville Tigres	QMJHL	18	14	20	34	16	—	—	—	—	—
1994–95	Ottawa Senators	NHL	47	16	21	37	14	—	—	—	—	—
1995–96	Ottawa Senators	NHL	50	5	12	17	24	—	—	—	—	—
1996–97	Ottawa Senators	NHL	82	26	25	51	33	7	0	0	0	2
1997–98	Ottawa Senators	NHL	38	7	9	16	8	—	—	—	—	—
1997–98	Philadelphia Flyers	NHL	37	9	17	26	6	5	0	2	2	0
1998–99	Philadelphia Flyers	NHL	31	3	2	5	2	—	—	—	—	—
1998–99	Tampa Bay Lightning	NHL	32	6	6	12	2	—	—	—	—	—
1999–00	New York Rangers	NHL	58	8	18	26	23	—	—	—	—	—
1999–00	Hartford Wolf Pack	AHL	16	6	13	19	4	—	—	—	—	—
2002–03	Pittsburgh Penguins	NHL	33	4	3	7	8	—	—	—	—	—
2002–03	Wilkes–Barre/Scranton Penguins	AHL	40	9	29	38	18	4	0	1	1	0
2003–04	Minnesota Wild	NHL	78	20	31	51	14	—	—	—	—	—
2004–05	Forward–Morges HC	NLB	—	—	—	—	—	2	1	1	2	0
2005–06	Minnesota Wild	NHL	46	5	23	28	12	—	—	—	—	—
2005–06	Manchester Monarchs	AHL	16	6	8	14	4	7	4	7	11	6
2006–07	HC Davos	NLA	44	22	39	61	44	18	4	9	13	6
2007–08	HC Davos	NLA	45	13	30	43	59	12	6	5	11	2
2008–09	HC Davos	NLA	44	9	23	32	8	10	1	2	3	2
2009–10	HC Davos	NLA	4	2	2	4	2	—	—	—	—	—
2009–10	HC Fribourg–Gottéron	NLA	2	0	2	2	0	—	—	—	—	—
2009–10	SCL Tigers	NLA	25	7	17	24	0	—	—	—	—	—
NHL totals			616	129	198	327	186	12	0	2	2	2

=== International ===
Medal record

Men's ice hockey

Representing Canada

World Junior Championships
Gold medal – first place	1993 Sweden	
Gold medal – first place	1995 Canada	

Year	Team	Event	Results	GP	G	A	Pts	PIM
1993	Canada	WJC	1st place, gold medalist(s)	7	0	6	6	27
1995	Canada	WJC	1st place, gold medalist(s)	7	2	8	10	4
Junior totals				14	2	14	16	31

== Awards and honours ==
- 1991–92 – CHL Rookie of the Year
- 1991–92 – QMJHL Second All-Star Team
- 1991–92 – QMJHL Michel Bergeron Trophy
- 1992–93 – CHL top draft prospect
- 1992–93 – QMJHL Mike Bossy Trophy
- 1992–93 – QMJHL First All-Star Team

Preceded by Roman Hamrlík	NHL first overall draft pick 1993	Succeeded by Ed Jovanovski
Preceded by Alexei Yashin	Ottawa Senators first-round draft pick 1993	Succeeded by Radek Bonk
