= Michael Andlauer =

Canadian businessman

- Andlauer in 2024
- Born: Michael N. Andlauer; 1966 (age 59–60); Toulouse, France
- Occupations: Businessman, sports franchise owner
- Known for: Founder & CEO of Andlauer Healthcare Group; Owner of the Ottawa Senators
- Board member of: Ottawa Senators

Michael Andlauer (born 1966) is a French-born Canadian businessman who is known for being the founder of Andlauer Healthcare Group and the majority owner of the National Hockey League (NHL) team, the Ottawa Senators. He is the founder of the businesses ATS Healthcare, Accuristix, and Bulldog Capital Partners and the CEO of Andlauer Healthcare Group.

As the majority owner of the Ottawa Senators, he also shares ownership of its minor league affiliate American Hockey League team, the Belleville Senators (AHL). He was formerly a minority owner of the Montreal Canadiens NHL team until he, along with other limited partners, purchased the Senators. He previously owned the Ontario Hockey League (OHL) team, the Brantford Bulldogs.

== Early life ==
Andlauer was born in Toulouse, France, and moved to Canada when he was two. Andlauer was raised by a single mother, Monique Van de Velde, in the neighbourhood of Notre-Dame-de-Grace, located in Montreal, Quebec, Canada. He attended York University in Toronto, but dropped out to take a job at McCain Foods.

== Career ==
=== Business career ===
In 1991, Andlauer, by now the head of McCain's trucking operations, left the company to launch the Andlauer Transportation Services trucking company, which delivers pharmaceutical products. It grew into one of Canada's largest health transportation companies.

In 1994, Andlauer launched a healthcare logistics firm now known as Accuristix, Bulldog Capital Partners, a private equity firm, and founded Andlauer Management Group (AMG), which manages transportation and logistics companies across the country.

In 2019, Andlauer launched Andlauer Healthcare Group to consolidate several specialized healthcare supply chain companies together.

=== Hockey ownership ===
==== Minor league ownership ====
In 2003, Andlauer became part-owner of the Hamilton Bulldogs American Hockey League (AHL) team, the minor-league affiliate of the Montreal Canadiens. He became the majority owner of the team the following year, and sold the team to the Canadiens in 2015. The Canadiens subsequently relocated the team, and it is now the Laval Rocket.

At the same time, Andlauer bought the Belleville Bulls Ontario Hockey League junior team and moved them to Hamilton, Ontario, renaming them the Hamilton Bulldogs. In 2023, the Hamilton Bulldogs moved to Brantford, Ontario, becoming the Brantford Bulldogs, due to renovations at FirstOntario Centre. In 2025, the OHL franchise for the Brantford Bulldogs, formerly the Hamilton Bulldogs, was sold to an ownership group headed by the family of NHL player Zach Hyman, making the team's temporary relocation to Brantford permanent. The purchase price was not disclosed.

==== National Hockey League ownership ====
In 2009, Andlauer became a part-owner of the Canadiens, the Bell Centre and Gillett Entertainment Group as part of Geoff Molson's group of investors that purchased the team that year. He would later become the team's alternate governor on the NHL's Board of Governors.

From 2022 through June 2023, Andlauer was one of several prospective purchasers of the Ottawa Senators, which went up for sale after its owner, Eugene Melnyk, died. In June 2023, he and his investors announced they had signed a purchase agreement to buy the club for a reported US$950 million. Andlauer became majority owner along with his partners, a group of 20-plus local businessmen and Eugene Melnyk's daughters, Anna and Olivia Melnyk, who retained 10 percent of the franchise, on September 21, 2023. He later sold his minority stake in the Canadiens to Molson for US$250 million as part of an agreement to buy the Senators. In 2024, Andlauer purchased the twelve percent stake in the Senators that was owned by George Armoyan.

== Personal life ==
Andlauer and his wife Lucie have three children. In 2017, Lucie Andlauer founded Subterra Renewables, a company that specializes in the implementation of geothermal energy.

Sporting positions
Preceded by Olivia and Anna Melnyk	Ottawa Senators owner 2023–present	Incumbent
