= Roy Mlakar =

Roy Mlakar (born September 10, 1950 in Parma, Ohio) is an American former professional ice hockey executive. He is the former president, alternate governor and CEO of the Ottawa Senators of the National Hockey League (NHL) and the Scotiabank Place arena. He was previously the president of the Los Angeles Kings.

== Personal life ==
Mlakar is married. He and wife Tamera each have two daughters. Mlakar was director with various charities in Ottawa, including the Sens Foundation, the Candlelighters and the Ottawa Senators 65 Roses Sports Club. He was also a director with the Ottawa Sports Hall of Fame. He has received several awards for his community work, including the Brian Kilrea Award in 2005 and the United Way Community Builder Award in 2006.

== Career ==
=== Providence Reds ===
Mlakar was hired by the Providence Reds of the AHL in 1973. He served as director of public relations and was later promoted to the position of assistant general manager working with then Providence GM John Muckler.

=== New Haven Nighthawks ===
In 1978, Mlakar joined the New Haven Nighthawks the AHL affiliate of the Los Angeles Kings. He spent 11 seasons with the team, winning the James C. Hendy Memorial Award as the AHL's Executive of the Year in 1985.

=== Los Angeles Kings ===
Mlakar joined the Kings front office in 1988. He spent seven seasons with the team, five as an executive vice-president and two as club president. He was instrumental in bringing Wayne Gretzky to the Kings from the Edmonton Oilers. The Kings made it to the Stanley Cup Final in 1993 under his leadership. During his tenure with Los Angeles, the Kings set a California professional sports record with 282 consecutive sellouts.

=== Pittsburgh Penguins ===
Following his stint with the Kings, Mlakar served as chief operating officer for the Pittsburgh Penguins for two seasons before joining the Senators

=== Ottawa Senators ===
Mlakar was appointed president and chief executive officer of the Ottawa Senators on June 3, 1996. He took on responsibilities for Scotiabank Place in May 1998. In 2007, the Senators made it to the Stanley Cup Final where they played the Anaheim Ducks, eventually losing in five games. At the end of the 2008-2009 regular season, having concluded a disappointing season in which the team missed the playoffs, the team announced on June 16, 2009 that Mlakar would be relieved of his duties upon the expiration of his contract on June 30, 2009.
