= Rod Bryden =

Canadian businessman

Roderick M. Bryden (born March 13, 1941) is a Canadian businessman. He served as a prominent Ottawa business executive. He is best known as the former owner of the Ottawa Senators of the National Hockey League from 1992 until 2003.

== Biography ==
Bryden was born in Port Elgin, New Brunswick. He obtained a B.A. Hon. Ec., from Mount Allison University in Sackville, New Brunswick; an LLB, University of New Brunswick, Fredericton; and an LLM, University of Michigan, Ann Arbor.

He taught law at the University of Saskatchewan as assistant law professor, from 1966 to 1969 before moving to Ontario, where he held a succession of positions in the Canadian federal government.

In 1974, Bryden founded Systemhouse Ltd., a computer integration firm where he served as president or chairman until 1991. In 1979, he founded Paperboard Industries Corporation (PIC) by purchasing Trent Valley Paperboard Mills. He served as chairman of PIC until 1991. Both companies were enjoying annual revenues of over $700 million when he stepped down that year.

In 1992, Bryden became CEO of Terrace Corporation, the principal owner of the new Ottawa Senators NHL franchise. In 1993, he became the franchise's Chairman and Governor. In 1994, construction on the Palladium arena (later the Corel Centre and Scotiabank Place, Now the Canadian Tire Centre) was begun by the Palladium Corporation, of which Bryden was the owner and chairman. The arena opened in 1996.

In 1996, Bryden formed the WorldHeart Corporation in coalition with the University of Ottawa Heart Institute, Dr. Tofy Mussivand and Dr. Michael Cowpland. Bryden served as president and CEO of the company before resigning in 2004.

Late in 2004, Bryden avoided personal bankruptcy, brought on by $100 million of debt personally owed to creditors and investors of the Ottawa Senators franchise. Bryden agreed to pay creditors a total of $600,000 on the debt, which was induced by high player salaries and an unfavourable exchange rate against the US dollar.

In 2005, Bryden was appointed as the new chairman of cancer drug developer PharmaGap, Inc.

Until 2014, he was President and CEO of Plasco Energy Group, an Ottawa firm developing energy production using plasma gasification, from household waste. A year later, Plasco filed for protection under CCAA. Seven months later, Mr. Bryden purchased the company from its secured lenders and led its rebuilding.

He also is the chairman of the board of SC Stormont Inc., and Chairman of the board of PharmaGap Inc. Bryden is also on the Board of Directors of Clearford Industries and Gallium Software Inc.

== Awards ==
- 2012 - Ottawa Sports Hall of Fame

Sporting positions
Preceded by Bruce Firestone	Ottawa Senators owner 1993–2003	Succeeded by Eugene Melnyk
