= List of Ottawa Senators general managers =

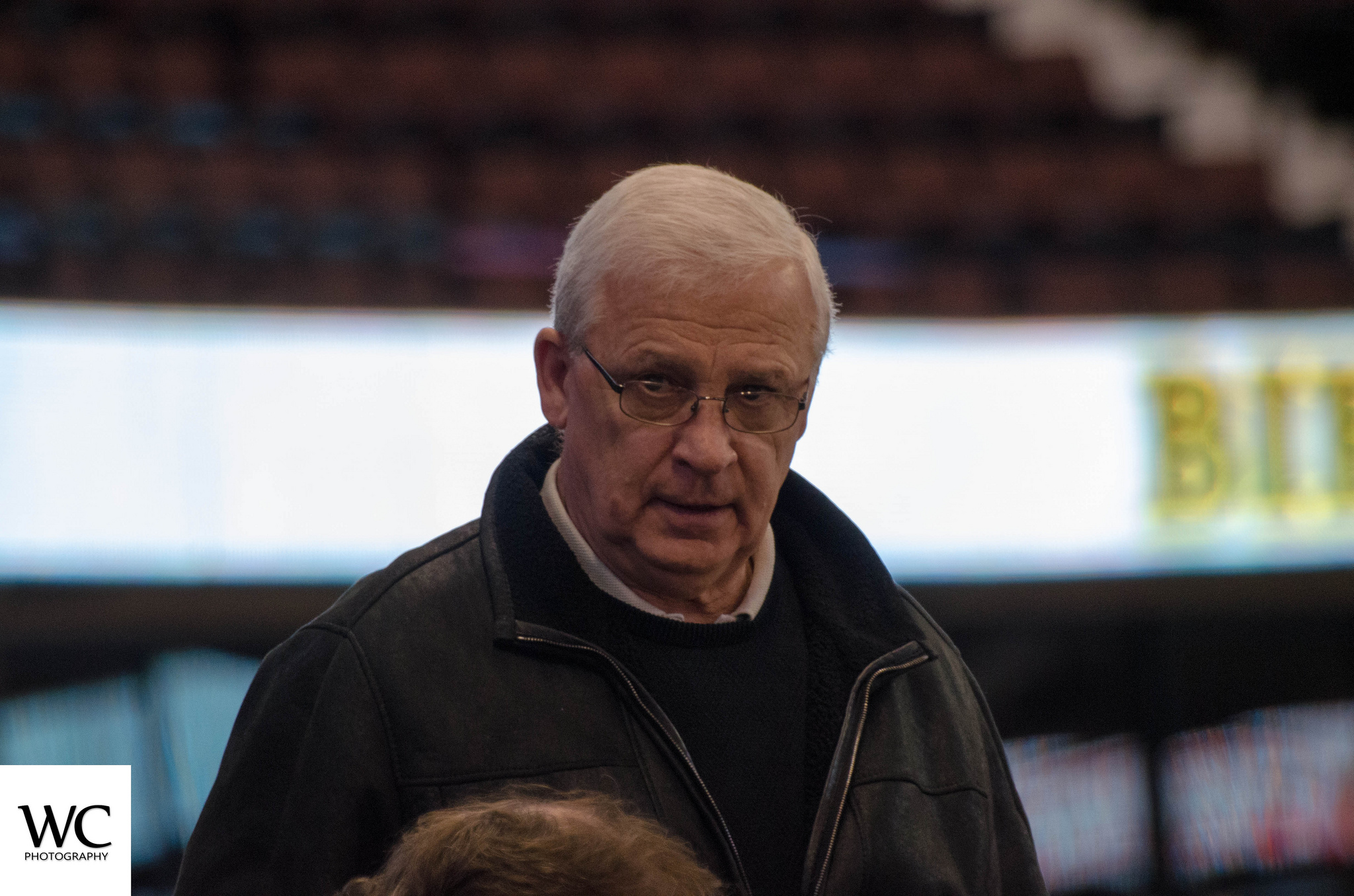
Bryan Murray was the seventh general manager of the Ottawa Senators.

The Ottawa Senators are a professional ice hockey team based in Ottawa, Ontario, Canada. The team is a member of the Atlantic Division of the Eastern Conference of the National Hockey League (NHL). The Senators, named after the original Ottawa Senators, began play in the NHL as an expansion team in 1992. Having first played at the Ottawa Civic Centre, the Senators have played their home games at the Canadian Tire Centre, which was first named The Palladium, since 1996. The team has had nine general managers since their inception.

== History ==
The Senators group was approved for a conditional NHL franchise on December 7, 1990. The founders, Bruce Firestone, Cyril Leeder and Randy Sexton, named the first general manager Mel Bridgman on August 30, 1991, prior to the franchise becoming finalized on December 7, 1991. Bridgman was fired after the Senators' first season 1992–93. Bridgman did not have previous experience as an NHL general manager and he was criticized for mistakes at the initial expansion draft of the Senators and the play of the team in its first season. Bridgman was later fired by new owner Rod Bryden, who had assumed majority ownership in the club after the founders were not able to raise enough financing to launch the team and pay its NHL franchise fees.

Sexton took over and managed the hockey club until December 11, 1995, when he was fired after a period of two seasons missing the playoffs and controversial coaching firings, player holdouts and concerns over attendance prior to the opening of the new Palladium arena. Sexton also did not have previous experience as an NHL general manager. He was criticized for the firing of Rick Bowness, over the playing time of Alexandre Daigle and the hiring of Dave Allison, the head coach of the team's minor league affiliate. Star player Alexei Yashin was holding out in a contract dispute, and top draft pick Bryan Berard was refusing to join the Senators at the time of Sexton's firing.

Pierre Gauthier was hired the same day and he replaced the coaching corps that Sexton had hired by hiring head coach Jacques Martin, who had NHL head coach experience. Yashin was signed and Berard was traded. Under Gauthier's leadership, the club qualified for the playoffs for the first time in the franchise's history. Gauthier resigned from the Senators in June 1998 for personal reasons. Gauthier returned to work as an ice hockey executive with the Mighty Ducks of Anaheim two weeks later. Gauthier had previously been the assistant general manager at Anaheim before being hired by Ottawa.

Former player Rick Dudley was hired immediately and he was general manager for one year, before leaving to join the Tampa Bay Lightning. After losing Gauthier for no compensation the year before, the Senators demanded compensation. The Senators received Rob Zamuner as compensation from Tampa along with an unspecified amount of cash and the Lightning's share of gate revenue for two games against Ottawa. As part of the deal, the Lightning received Andreas Johansson in exchange for a second-round draft pick. Dudley had managed the Detroit Vipers minor league affiliate and coached the Buffalo Sabres prior to joining Ottawa.

Player development director and assistant general manager Marshall Johnston was promoted to general manager, a position he held until his retirement in June 2002. During Johnston's period of management, the team qualified for the playoffs in each season. Johnston also held a good record in drafting players for the organization.

John Muckler, a former coach for the Edmonton Oilers and Buffalo Sabres was hired as general manager in June 2002. During Muckler's tenure, the team won the President's Trophy for the top regular season record and appeared in the 2007 Stanley Cup Finals. In 2003, the club declared bankruptcy and the team was purchased by Eugene Melnyk, a Canadian businessman. Melnyk retained Muckler and the entire Senators staff. Muckler fired head coach Martin after a disappointing loss in the 2004 playoffs and he hired Bryan Murray, the general manager of the Mighty Ducks of Anaheim as head coach. Muckler held the post until June 2007, when, fresh off of an appearance in the 2007 Stanley Cup Finals, owner Eugene Melnyk chose Murray to become general manager, and Muckler refused to accept another post in the organization. During each season of Muckler's management, the club was a playoff team and Muckler made trades of Senators prospects for NHL veterans in attempts to win the championship.

Murray continued as general manager of the Senators until 2016. Since 2007, the club appeared in the playoffs four times in seven seasons, with one series win. Murray has hired and fired four head coaches: John Paddock, Craig Hartsburg and Cory Clouston, and himself took over the head coaching duties partway through the 2007–08 season. In 2011, after the club's position in the standings declined to last place in the conference, Murray initiated a period of rebuilding of the club's prospects. In April 2011, he was re-signed by Melnyk to a three-year extension of his contract. In 2015, it was announced that Murray had cancer. Murray chose to continue, and promoted two assistant general managers. In April 2016, Murray stepped down and named assistant general manager Pierre Dorion as the eighth general manager of the Senators.

In Dorion's first season as general manager, the team qualified for the playoffs, reaching the Eastern Conference Final. However, in the rest of his tenure until November 2023, the team failed to make the playoffs. Dorion parted ways mutually with the Senators after the NHL levied the penalty of a first-round pick to the Senators. Under Dorion's management, the team failed to disclose properly a no-trade list as part of a trade of a player to another NHL team. Owner Michael Andlauer announced the resignation of Dorion as being at the 'right time' after a series of events under Dorion's tenure. Dorion's term was notable for the departure of several high-level players such as Erik Karlsson, Matt Duchene and Mark Stone and the drafting of high-level talent such as Brady Tkachuk, Tim Stützle, Shane Pinto, Jake Sanderson and others.

In November 2023, Steve Staios became the interim general manager in addition to his duties as president of hockey operations, before being promoted to permanent general manager in December.

== Key ==
Key of terms and definitions
Term	Definition
No.	Number of general managers^{[a]}
Ref(s)	References
–	Does not apply

== General managers ==
General managers of the Ottawa Senators
No.	Name	Tenure	Accomplishments during this term	Ref(s)
1	Mel Bridgman	August 30, 1991 – April 15, 1993	No playoff appearances	
2	Randy Sexton	April 15, 1993 – December 11, 1995	No playoff appearances	
3	Pierre Gauthier	December 11, 1995 – June 29, 1998	2 playoff appearances	
4	Rick Dudley	June 30, 1998 – June 8, 1999	1 division title and 1 playoff appearance	
5	Marshall Johnston	June 8, 1999 – June 30, 2002	1 division title and 3 playoff appearances	
6	John Muckler	July 1, 2002 – June 18, 2007	Won Presidents' Trophy (2002–03); 1 Stanley Cup Finals appearance (2007); 1 conference title, 2 division titles, and 4 playoff appearances	
7	Bryan Murray	June 18, 2007 – April 10, 2016	5 playoff appearances	
8	Pierre Dorion	April 10, 2016 – November 1, 2023	1 playoff appearance	
9	Steve Staios	November 1, 2023 – present^{[b]}	2 playoff appearances	

== See also ==
- List of NHL general managers

== Notes ==
- ^{a} A running total of the number of general managers of the franchise. Thus any general manager who has two or more separate terms as general manager is only counted once.
- ^{b} Staios was named interim general manager on November 1, before being promoted to permanent general manager on December 31.
