= Steve Staios =

Canadian ice hockey player and executive (born 1973)

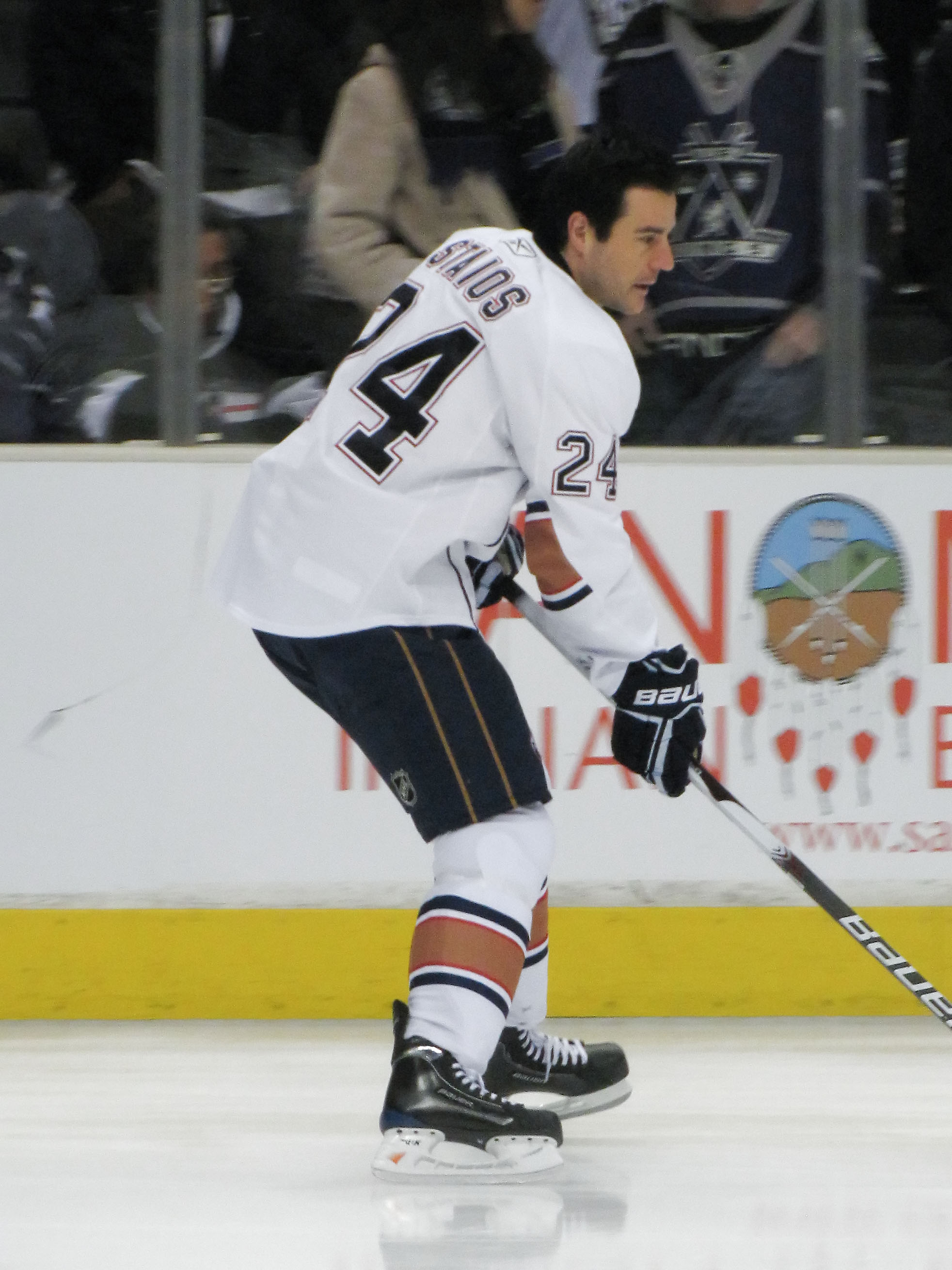
- Staios with the Edmonton Oilers in 2010
- Born: July 28, 1973 (age 53) Hamilton, Ontario, Canada
- Height: 6 ft 1 in (185 cm)
- Weight: 200 lb (91 kg; 14 st 4 lb)
- Position: Defence
- Shot: Right
- Played for: Boston Bruins; Vancouver Canucks; Atlanta Thrashers; Edmonton Oilers; Calgary Flames; New York Islanders
- National team: Canada
- NHL draft: 27th overall, 1991; St. Louis Blues
- Playing career: 1993–2012
Medal record
Representing Canada
World Championships
Gold medal – first place	2003 Finland
Gold medal – first place	2004 Czech Republic
Silver medal – second place	2008 Canada

Steve Staios (born July 28, 1973) is a Canadian ice hockey executive and former professional player. He currently serves as president of hockey operations and general manager for the Ottawa Senators. Staios played right defence in the National Hockey League (NHL) with the Boston Bruins, Vancouver Canucks, Atlanta Thrashers, Edmonton Oilers, Calgary Flames, and New York Islanders during his career.

== Playing career ==
As a youth, Staios played in the 1987 Quebec International Pee-Wee Hockey Tournament with a minor ice hockey team from Hamilton West.

Staios was selected in the second round of the 1991 NHL entry draft, 27th overall, by the St. Louis Blues. After a three-year career in the Ontario Hockey League (OHL) with the Niagara Falls Thunder and Sudbury Wolves, Staios spent several years in the International Hockey League (IHL) and the American Hockey League (AHL) with the Blues' minor league affiliates. He was traded to the Boston Bruins on March 8, 1996, along with Kevin Sawyer for Stephen Leach. Staios made his NHL debut with the Bruins, appearing in 12 games to finish the 1995–96 season. The following season, in 1996–97, he was acquired on waivers by the Vancouver Canucks on March 18, 1997. He finished what qualified as his NHL rookie season with a combined 17 points in 63 games between the two teams.

After two more seasons with the Canucks thereafter, Staios was left unprotected for the 1999 NHL Expansion Draft and was selected by the Atlanta Thrashers. He changed his position to right wing, but was often sidelined in his first season with Atlanta, appearing in just 27 games due to a knee injury suffered in a game against the Colorado Avalanche on October 23, 1999. The following season, Staios was named team captain, succeeding Kelly Buchberger for the 2000–01 season. He recorded 22 points in 70 games in his final year as a Thrasher.

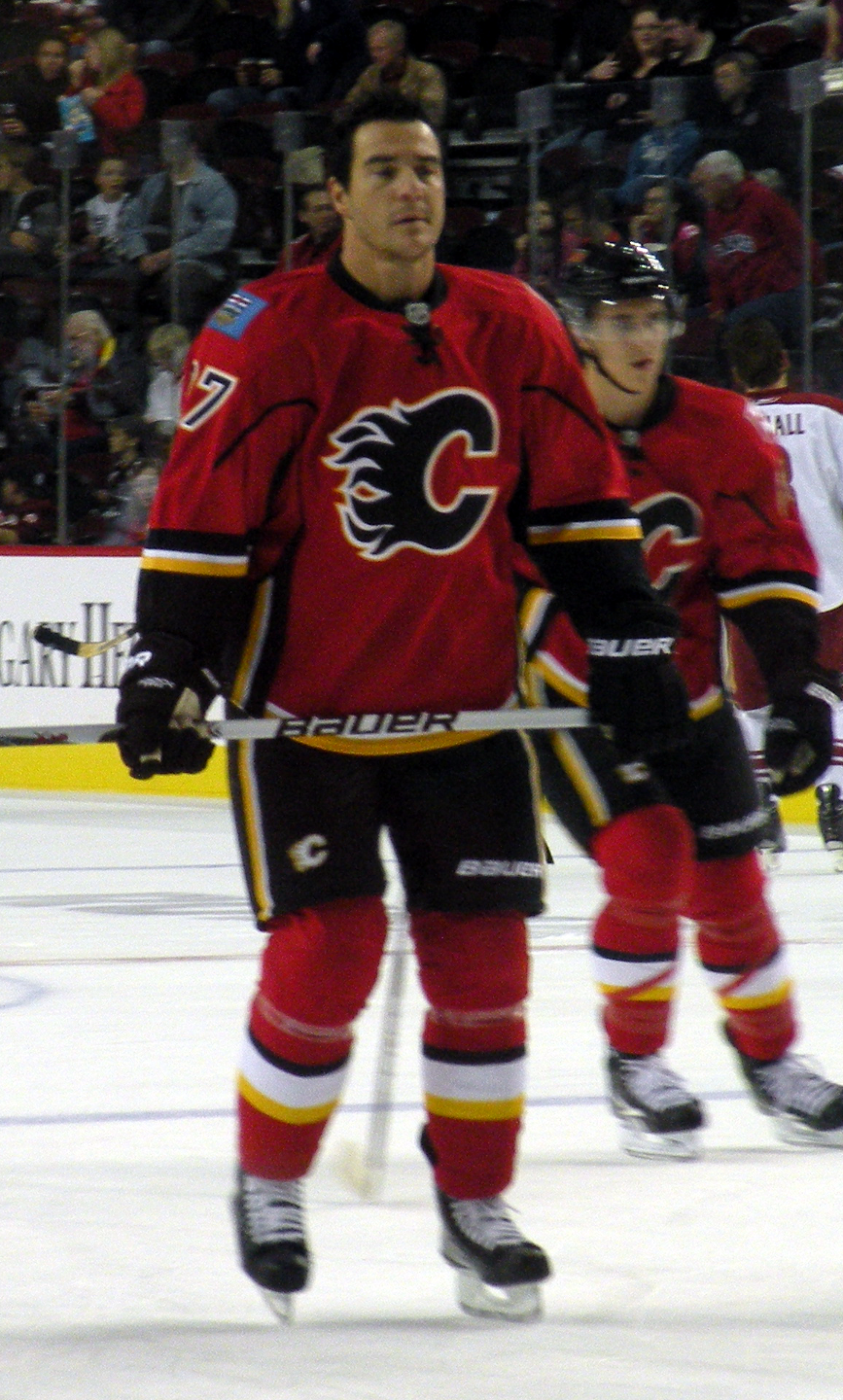
Steve Staios warming up with the Calgary Flames

In the 2001 off-season, Staios signed as an unrestricted free agent with the Edmonton Oilers on July 12, 2001. In 2002–03, he led all defenceman in shorthanded goals (3). After the 2004–05 NHL lockout, during which time Staios played briefly with Luleå HF of the Swedish Elitserien, Staios was part of the Oilers team that made a run to the 2006 Stanley Cup Finals. He scored one goal and five assists in a career-high 24 playoff games; however, the Oilers lost in game seven of the finals to the Carolina Hurricanes. He had notably taken a penalty in overtime during game five of the finals, an elimination game for the Oilers. However, Fernando Pisani scored shorthanded to force a game six.

An injury shortened 2006-07 season saw Staios play in only 58 games, scoring two goals. He managed to stay healthy the next two seasons, playing in all 82 games during the 2007-08 campaign and in 80 games during the 2008-09 campaign, recording a combined 30 points.

Staios was sidelined for a month, early in the 2009-10 season, suffering a concussion on October 6, 2009.

On March 3, 2010, Staios was traded to the Calgary Flames from the Edmonton Oilers in exchange for Aaron Johnson and a third round draft pick in 2011. It was the first trade between the franchises in their histories. He ultimately missed the majority of 2010-11 due to a recurring upper body injury.

On September 30, 2011, Staios signed as an unrestricted free agent with the New York Islanders. On April 5, 2012 Staios played in his 1000th NHL game.

Staios announced his retirement as a player following his 1001st NHL game during the 2011-12 season.

== Post-playing career ==
On July 25, 2012, Staios was named Player Development Adviser for the NHL's Toronto Maple Leafs. On December 4, 2014, he was named the Maple Leafs' Manager of Player Development. After the firing of head coach Randy Carlyle on January 6, 2015, Staios moved behind the bench to support the Leafs' interim coaching staff.

On June 5, 2015, Staios was named president of the Hamilton Bulldogs of the Ontario Hockey League. In 2016, he assumed the role of president and general manager. The Hamilton Bulldogs won the OHL Championship in 2018 and 2022. Staios won the Jim Gregory Award, awarded annually to the Ontario Hockey League General Manager of the Year, for the 2021-2022 Season.

Staios joined the Edmonton Oilers on October 6, 2022, as a special advisor to the club's hockey operations staff.

On September 29, 2023, Staios was announced as the president of hockey operations of the Ottawa Senators.

On November 1, 2023, Staios was named interim general manager of the Ottawa Senators following the firing of Pierre Dorion. He was subsequently named permanent general manager of the Senators on December 31, while still maintaining his title as president of hockey operations.

== Personal ==
Staios was born to Macedonian parents. He has two children with his wife, Susannah.

His son, Nathan Staios, was selected 17th overall in the first round of the 2017 OHL Entry Draft by the Windsor Spitfires.

== Career statistics ==
=== Regular season and playoffs ===
			Regular season					Playoffs
Season	Team	League	GP	G	A	Pts	PIM	GP	G	A	Pts	PIM
1990–91	Niagara Falls Thunder	OHL	66	17	29	46	115	12	2	3	5	10
1991–92	Niagara Falls Thunder	OHL	65	11	42	53	122	17	7	8	15	27
1992–93	Niagara Falls Thunder	OHL	12	4	14	18	30	—	—	—	—	—
1992–93	Sudbury Wolves	OHL	53	13	44	57	67	11	5	6	11	22
1993–94	Peoria Rivermen	IHL	38	3	9	12	42	—	—	—	—	—
1994–95	Peoria Rivermen	IHL	60	3	13	16	64	6	0	0	0	10
1995–96	Peoria Rivermen	IHL	6	0	1	1	14	—	—	—	—	—
1995–96	Worcester IceCats	AHL	57	1	11	12	114	—	—	—	—	—
1995–96	Providence Bruins	AHL	7	1	4	5	8	—	—	—	—	—
1995–96	Boston Bruins	NHL	12	0	0	0	4	3	0	0	0	0
1996–97	Boston Bruins	NHL	54	3	8	11	71	—	—	—	—	—
1996–97	Vancouver Canucks	NHL	9	0	6	6	20	—	—	—	—	—
1997–98	Vancouver Canucks	NHL	77	3	4	7	134	—	—	—	—	—
1998–99	Vancouver Canucks	NHL	57	0	2	2	54	—	—	—	—	—
1999–00	Atlanta Thrashers	NHL	27	2	3	5	66	—	—	—	—	—
2000–01	Atlanta Thrashers	NHL	70	9	13	22	137	—	—	—	—	—
2001–02	Edmonton Oilers	NHL	73	5	5	10	108	—	—	—	—	—
2002–03	Edmonton Oilers	NHL	76	5	21	26	96	6	0	0	0	4
2003–04	Edmonton Oilers	NHL	82	6	22	28	86	—	—	—	—	—
2004–05	Luleå HF	Elit	7	2	1	3	12	—	—	—	—	—
2005–06	Edmonton Oilers	NHL	82	8	20	28	84	24	1	5	6	28
2006–07	Edmonton Oilers	NHL	58	2	15	17	97	—	—	—	—	—
2007–08	Edmonton Oilers	NHL	82	7	9	16	121	—	—	—	—	—
2008–09	Edmonton Oilers	NHL	80	2	12	14	92	—	—	—	—	—
2009–10	Edmonton Oilers	NHL	40	0	7	7	59	—	—	—	—	—
2009–10	Calgary Flames	NHL	18	1	2	3	16	—	—	—	—	—
2010–11	Calgary Flames	NHL	39	3	7	10	24	—	—	—	—	—
2011–12	New York Islanders	NHL	65	0	8	8	53	—	—	—	—	—
NHL totals			1,001	56	164	220	1,322	33	1	5	6	32

=== International ===
Year	Team	Event	Result	GP	G	A	Pts	PIM
2002	Canada	WC	6th	6	1	0	1	4
2003	Canada	WC	1st place, gold medalist(s)	9	0	3	3	4
2004	Canada	WC	1st place, gold medalist(s)	9	1	1	2	6
2008	Canada	WC	2nd place, silver medalist(s)	9	0	0	0	2
Senior totals				33	2	4	6	16

== See also ==
- List of NHL players with 1,000 games played

Sporting positions
Preceded by Kelly Buchberger	Atlanta Thrashers captain 2000–01	Succeeded by Ray Ferraro
Preceded by Pierre Dorion	General Manager of the Ottawa Senators; 2023–present	Incumbent
