= Pierre Dorion =

Canadian ice hockey executive

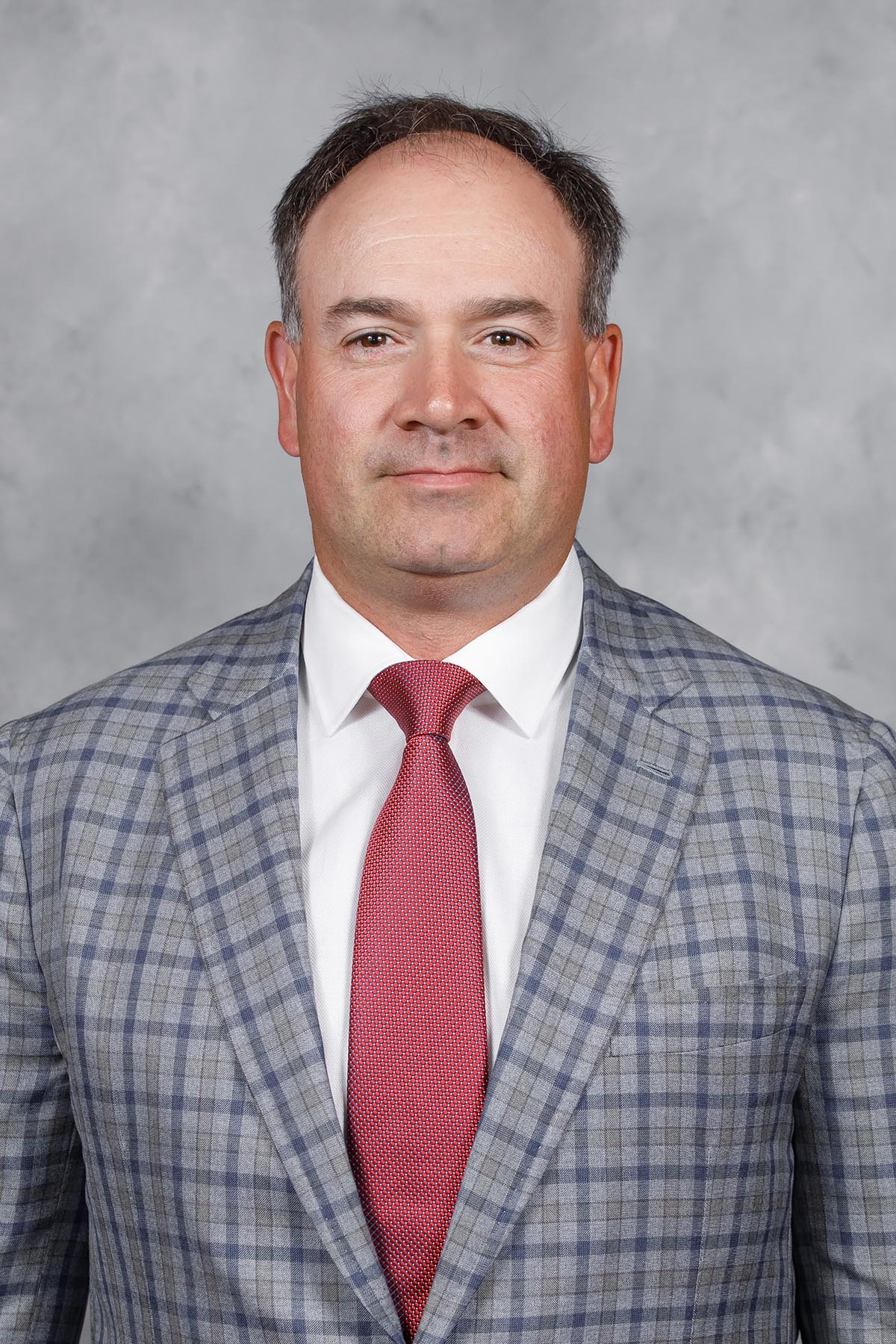
- Dorion in 2021
- Born: July 6, 1972 (age 54); Ottawa, Ontario, Canada
- Occupation: Ice hockey executive
- Years active: 1994–2023

Pierre Dorion Jr. (born July 6, 1972) is a Canadian former professional ice hockey executive. He served as a scout for the Montreal Canadiens and New York Rangers before serving as the general manager of the Ottawa Senators (NHL) from 2016 to 2023.

== Career ==
Dorion was an amateur scout for the Montreal Canadiens for eleven years until 2005. He then joined the New York Rangers as a scout of amateur teams. Dorion joined the Ottawa Senators in July 2007 as chief amateur scout. In 2009, he was named director of player personnel. In 2014, Dorion and Randy Lee were both named assistant general managers after general manager Bryan Murray's nephew Tim Murray left his assistant general manager position to become the general manager of the Buffalo Sabres.

On April 10, 2016, Bryan Murray announced that he would be stepping down as the Senators' general manager and that Dorion would succeed him. Murray remained with the team as a senior advisor through the 2016–17 season up until his death in August 2017. Lee remained as assistant general manager. On February 10, 2018, the Senators announced that they signed Dorion to a three-year contract extension. At the end of that contract, Dorion agreed to a three-year extension on September 7, 2021.

Dorion was fired as Senators' general manager on November 1, 2023, after the team was forced by the NHL to forfeit a first-round draft pick as punishment for their role in a voided trade between the Vegas Golden Knights and Anaheim Ducks. Dorion had traded forward Evgenii Dadonov to Las Vegas in 2021 but failed to provide the Golden Knights with the player's 10-team no-trade list, a list which included the Anaheim Ducks. Las Vegas subsequently traded Dadonov to the Ducks at the 2022 NHL trade deadline, but the trade was rejected by the NHL due to Anaheim being on the player's valid no-trade list. Upon Dorion's firing, Steve Staios, the Senators' president of hockey operations, was named the team's interim general manager.

== Personal life ==
Dorion has two children from a previous marriage. Dorion's father was also an ice hockey executive, having worked for the NHL's Central Scouting Bureau during the 1980s, spent a year as an assistant general manager in junior ice hockey with North Bay, and was the head scout for the Toronto Maple Leafs from 1990 until his death from a heart attack in 1994.

Dorion attended high school at École secondaire catholique Garneau.

Preceded by Bryan Murray	General manager of the Ottawa Senators; 2016–2023	Succeeded by Steve Staios (interim)
