= Pierre Gauthier =

Canadian ice hockey executive (born 1953)

- Born: May 28, 1953 (age 73); Montreal, Quebec, Canada
- Education: Syracuse University (BSc); University of Minnesota
- Occupation: Canadian ice hockey executive

Pierre Gauthier (born May 28, 1953) is a Canadian ice hockey executive. He worked as general manager of the Ottawa Senators, Anaheim Ducks and Montreal Canadiens, as well as other hockey operations roles with the Quebec Nordiques and the Chicago Blackhawks - with whom he won the Stanley Cup in 2013 and 2015. He has also served in hockey operations roles for Hockey Canada at multiple Ice Hockey World Championships and 1998 Winter Olympics.

== Early life ==
Prior to his career in professional hockey, Gauthier attended the University of Minnesota, where he received a master's degree in sport administration in 1983. He was also a graduate of Syracuse University, earning a Bachelor of Science degree in physical education.

== Hockey career ==
=== Quebec Nordiques (1983–1993) ===
Gauthier began his hockey career with the Quebec Nordiques, starting as a scout in 1983. In 1986, he was promoted to assistant director of scouting, and in 1988, he was promoted to director of amateur scouting.

=== Mighty Ducks of Anaheim (1993–1995) ===
In 1993, Gauthier interviewed to become the general manager of the Mighty Ducks of Anaheim for their inaugural season. Although he did not get the job, he was hired on as the assistant general manager working under general manager Jack Ferreira. Gauthier's responsibilities included the Ducks' AHL farm team, the Baltimore Bandits.

=== Ottawa Senators (1995–1998) ===
On December 11, 1995, Gauthier was named the third general manager of the Ottawa Senators, replacing Randy Sexton. His time with Ottawa coincided with a turnaround in the team's fortunes. He acquired star defenseman Wade Redden and presided over drafts that brought franchise stars Marian Hossa, Chris Phillips, Mike Fisher and Chris Neil. On June 29, 1998, immediately after the 1998 NHL Entry Draft, Gauthier resigned from his position with the Senators, citing family reasons.

=== Mighty Ducks of Anaheim (1995–2002) ===
On July 16, 1998, just seventeen days after leaving the Senators, Gauthier was announced as returning to Anaheim, as the team's president. On August 6, 1998, Gauthier announced that his former boss, Ferreria would be demoted to be vice president of hockey operations and Gauthier would take over as the Mighty Ducks general manager.

Over the four years that Gauthier served as general manager, Anaheim made the playoffs once. Gauthier oversaw the trade of franchise icon Teemu Selanne to the San Jose Sharks as well as the acquisition of Jean-Sebastian Giguere and Samuel Pahlsson, and the drafting of Ilya Bryzgalov. On April 19, 2002, Gauthier was fired by the Ducks after the team failed to make the playoffs for the third consecutive season.

=== Montreal Canadiens (2003–2012) ===
On July 21, 2003, Gauthier joined the Montreal Canadiens as director of professional scouting. On July 24, 2006, he was named assistant to the general manager while keeping the responsibilities attached to professional scouting. On February 8, 2010, he was named vice president and general manager of the Montreal Canadiens, replacing Bob Gainey.

Gauthier's final season as the GM of the Canadiens in 2011–12 was rife with controversy. Gauthier fired the team coach Jacques Martin mid-season with the team slumping. Martin's replacement, Randy Cunneyworth, was chosen by Gauthier as the interim coach. Cunneyworth did not speak French, and this decision was heavily scrutinized by the Montreal media. There was outrage and protest among some Canadiens fans.

Gauthier also incited the wrath of fans by trading popular forward Michael Cammalleri to the Calgary Flames during a game against the Boston Bruins. Cammalleri had been critical of the organization in the days leading up to the trade, and the move was perceived by many to be a response to those comments. When he learned of the trade, Cammalleri asked if he could keep the jersey from his final game as a souvenir. Gauthier told him he could have it for the price of $1,250.

On March 29, 2012, the Montreal Canadiens announced Gauthier had been relieved of his duties as general manager of the team. Shortly after dismissing Gauthier, the team gifted Cammalleri with the jersey from his final game as a souvenir.

=== Chicago Blackhawks (2012–2020) ===
In the summer of 2012, Gauthier was hired by the Chicago Blackhawks, as their director of player personnel. He remained in that role for eight seasons and was part of the Blackhawks front office when the team won the Stanley Cup in 2013 and 2015. He transitioned to senior advisor role for the 2020–21 season, before leaving the organization.

=== Hockey Canada ===
Throughout his hockey career, Gauthier also served Canada in international hockey. He was the general manager for Team Canada at the 1996 Men's Ice Hockey World Championships winning a silver medal.

On January 30, 1997, Gauthier was named assistant general manager for Team Canada at the 1998 Winter Olympics, the first Olympics where NHL players would participate. As part of the leadership team alongside general manager Bobby Clarke and assistant general manager Bob Gainey, he also helped manage Team Canada's entry in the 1997 Men's World Ice Hockey Championships, winning gold.

Gauthier also served as assistant general manager for Canada's team at the 2009 IIHF World Championship, where Canada won gold.

Preceded by Randy Sexton	General Manager of the Ottawa Senators; 1995–1998	Succeeded by Rick Dudley
Preceded by Jack Ferreira	General Manager of the Mighty Ducks of Anaheim; 1998–2002	Succeeded by Bryan Murray
Preceded by Bob Gainey	General Manager of the Montreal Canadiens; 2010–12	Succeeded by Marc Bergevin
