= Ottawa Senators =

National Hockey League team in Ottawa, Ontario

Ottawa Senators Sénateurs d'Ottawa
- 2026–27 Ottawa Senators season
- Conference: Eastern
- Division: Atlantic
- Founded: 1992
- History: Ottawa Senators; 1992–present
- Home arena: Canadian Tire Centre
- City: Ottawa, Ontario
- Team colours: Red, black, white, gold
- Media: English; TSN5; TSN Radio 1200; French; RDS; RDS2; 104,7 Outaouais
- Owner: Michael Andlauer
- General manager: Steve Staios
- Head coach: Travis Green
- Captain: Thomas Chabot
- Minor league affiliates: Belleville Senators (AHL); Allen Americans (ECHL)
- Stanley Cups: 0 (Note: NHL Media Guide 2010. The original Senators organization, also known as the Ottawa Hockey Club, won the Stanley Cup 11 times, not the current franchise founded in 1992. Neither the NHL nor the Senators claim that the current Senators are a continuation of the original organization or franchise. The awards, statistics and championships of both eras are kept separate, and the NHL franchise founding date of the current Senators is in 1992.)
- Conference championships: 1 (2006–07)
- Presidents' Trophies: 1 (2002–03)
- Division championships: 4 (1998–99, 2000–01, 2002–03, 2005–06)
- Official website: nhl.com/senators

The Ottawa Senators (French: Sénateurs d'Ottawa), officially the Ottawa Senators Hockey Club (Note: French: Club de hockey Les Sénateurs d'Ottawa.) and colloquially known as the Sens, are a professional ice hockey team based in Ottawa. The Senators compete in the National Hockey League (NHL) as a member of the Atlantic Division in the Eastern Conference. The team plays its home games at Canadian Tire Centre, which opened in 1996.

Founded and established by Ottawa real estate developer Bruce Firestone, the team is the second NHL franchise to use the Ottawa Senators name. The original Ottawa Senators, founded in 1883, won the Stanley Cup 11 times, (Note: The National Hockey League counts 11. The Hockey Hall of Fame count is 10.) playing in the NHL from 1917 until 1934. On December 6, 1990, after a two-year public campaign by Firestone, the NHL awarded a new franchise, which began play in the 1992–93 season. The Senators have made 18 playoff appearances, won four division titles, and won the 2003 Presidents' Trophy. They made an appearance in the 2007 Stanley Cup Final but lost to the Anaheim Ducks in five games.

== History ==
Pre-launch logo used in the "Bring Back the Senators" campaign

Ottawa had been home to the original Senators, a founding NHL franchise and 11-time Stanley Cup champions. The original Senators' eventual financial losses forced the franchise to move to St. Louis in 1934 operating as the Eagles while a Senators senior amateur team took over the Senators' place in Ottawa. The NHL team was unsuccessful in St. Louis and planned to return to Ottawa, but the NHL decided instead to suspend the franchise and transfer the players.

Fifty-four years later, after the NHL announced plans to expand, Ottawa real estate developer Bruce Firestone decided along with colleagues Cyril Leeder and Randy Sexton that Ottawa was now able to support an NHL franchise, and the group proceeded to put a bid together. This effort was supported by key individuals including Jeff Kyle and Mark Bonneau who later became executives with the Senators. Firestone's firm, Terrace Investments, did not have the liquid assets to finance the expansion fee and the team, but the group conceived a strategy to leverage land development. In 1989, after finding a suitable site on farmland just west of Ottawa in Kanata on which to construct a new arena, Terrace announced its intention to win a franchise and launched a successful "Bring Back the Senators" campaign to both woo the public and persuade the NHL that the city could support an NHL franchise. Public support was high, and the group would secure over 11,000 season ticket pledges. On December 12, 1990, the NHL approved a new franchise for Firestone's group to start play in the 1992–93 season.

=== Early years (1992–1996) ===
The new team hired former NHL player Mel Bridgman, who had no previous NHL management experience, as its first general manager in 1992. Ottawa signed former Boston Bruins head coach Rick Bowness. The new Senators were placed in the Adams Division of the Wales Conference and played their first game on October 8, 1992, in the Ottawa Civic Centre against the Montreal Canadiens with much pre-game spectacle. The Senators defeated the Canadiens 5–3 in one of the few highlights that season. Following the initial excitement of the opening night victory, the club floundered badly. Eventually, it tied the San Jose Sharks for the worst record in the league, winning only 10 games with 70 losses and four ties for 24 points, three points better than the NHL record for futility. The Senators had aimed low and considered the 1992–93 season a small success, as Firestone had set a goal for the season of not setting a new NHL record for fewest points in a season. The long-term plan was to finish low in the standings for its first few years to secure high draft picks and eventually contend for the Stanley Cup.

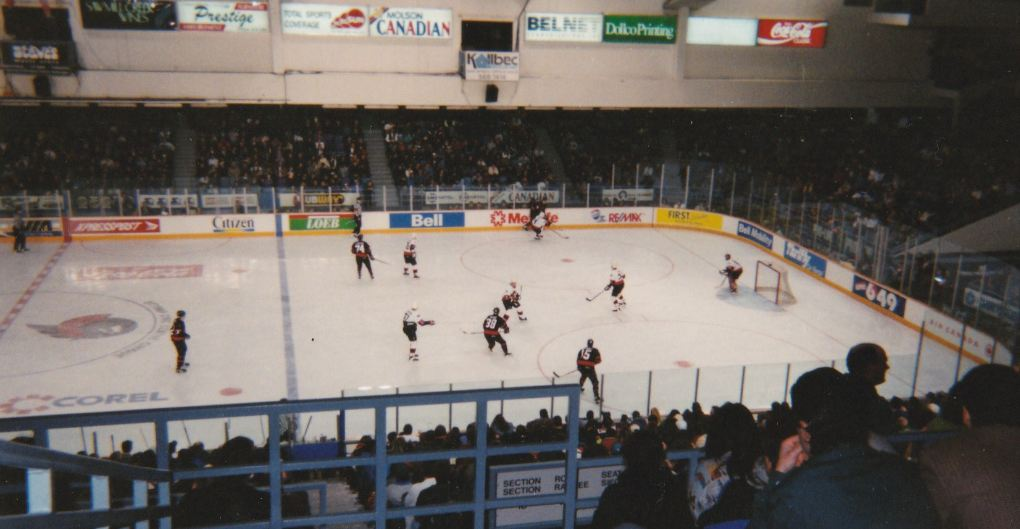
The Senators played their home games at the Ottawa Civic Centre from 1992 to 1996.

Terrace needed a partner to make the final franchise payment to the NHL. Firestone sold 50% of Terrace to Rod Bryden, a technology executive and entrepreneur. A limited partnership was set up to own the hockey team and a new company, Palladium Corp., which was charged with building the new arena. The partnership included local high-tech executives and singer Paul Anka, who was born in Ottawa. Bryden would become the sole owner of Terrace and majority owner of the Senators in August 1993, buying out Firestone.

Bridgman was fired after one season and team president Randy Sexton took over the general manager duties. The strategy of aiming low and securing a high draft position did not change. The Senators finished last overall for the next three seasons. For the 1993–94 season, the team now played in the Eastern Conference's Northeast Division. Although 1993 first overall draft choice Alexandre Daigle wound up being one of the greatest draft busts in NHL history, they chose Radek Bonk in 1994, Bryan Berard (traded for Wade Redden) in 1995, Chris Phillips in 1996 and Marián Hossa in 1997, all of whom would become solid NHL players and formed a strong core of players in years to come. Alexei Yashin, the team's first-ever draft selection from 1992, emerged as one of the NHL's brightest young stars. The team traded many of their better veteran players of the era, including 1992–93 leading scorer Norm Maciver and fan favourites Mike Peluso and Bob Kudelski in an effort to stockpile prospects and draft picks.

As the 1995–96 season began, Yashin refused to honour his contract and did not play. In December, after three straight last-place finishes and a team which was ridiculed throughout the league, fans began to grow restless waiting for the team's long-term plan to yield results, and arena attendance began to decline. Bowness was fired in late 1995 and was replaced by the Prince Edward Island Senators' head coach Dave Allison. Allison would fare no better than his predecessor, and the team would stumble to a 2–22–3 record under him. Sexton himself was fired and replaced by Pierre Gauthier, the former assistant general manager of the Mighty Ducks of Anaheim team. Before the end of January 1996, Gauthier had resolved the team's most pressing issues by settling Yashin's contract dispute, and hiring the highly regarded Jacques Martin as head coach. While Ottawa finished last-overall once again, the season ended with renewed optimism, due in part to the upgraded management and coaching, and also to the emergence of an unheralded rookie from Sweden named Daniel Alfredsson, who would win the Calder Memorial Trophy as NHL Rookie of the Year in 1996.

=== Jacques Martin era (1996–2004) ===
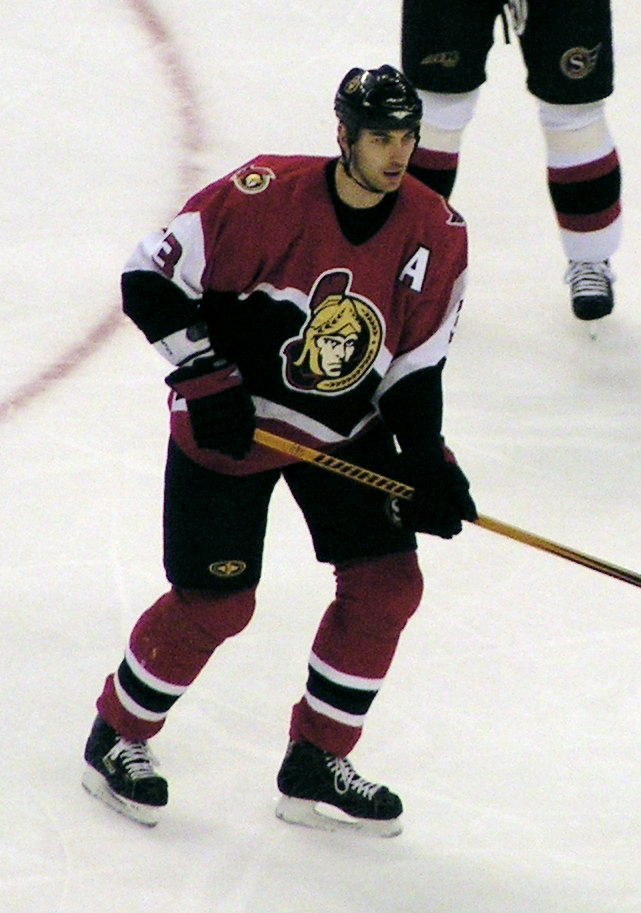
During the 2001 NHL entry draft, the Senators acquired Zdeno Chára in a multi-player trade with the New York Islanders.

Martin imposed a "strong defence first" philosophy that led to the team qualifying for the playoffs every season that he coached, but he was criticized for the team's lack of success in the playoffs, notably losing four straight series against their provincial rival, the Toronto Maple Leafs.

In 1996–97, his first season, the club qualified for the playoffs in the last game of the season and nearly defeated the Buffalo Sabres in the first round. In 1997–98, the club finished with their first winning record and upset the heavily favoured New Jersey Devils to win their first playoff series. However, they were ousted in the second round by the Washington Capitals. In 1998–99, the Senators jumped from fourteenth overall in the previous season to third, with 103 points—the first 100-point season in club history, only to be swept in the first round by the Sabres. In 1999–2000, despite Yashin's holdout, Martin guided the team to the playoffs, only to lose to the Maple Leafs in the first Battle of Ontario series. Yashin returned for 2000–01 and the team improved to win their division and place second in the Eastern Conference. Yashin played poorly in another first-round playoff loss and on the day of the 2001 NHL entry draft, he was traded to the New York Islanders in exchange for Zdeno Chára, Bill Muckalt and the second overall selection in the draft, which Ottawa used to select centre Jason Spezza.

The 2001–02 Senators regular season points total dropped, but in the playoffs, they upset the Philadelphia Flyers for the franchise's second playoff series win. The Sens would go on to push their second-round series to seven games, but they were ultimately once again defeated by the Maple Leafs. Despite speculation that Martin would be fired, it was general manager Marshall Johnston who left, retiring from the team. He was replaced by John Muckler, the Senators' first with previous management experience.

Although the Senators were bankrupt, they continued to play in the 2002–03 season after getting emergency financing. Despite the off-ice problems, Ottawa had an outstanding season, placing first overall in the NHL to win the Presidents' Trophy. In the playoffs, they came within one game of making it into the 2003 Stanley Cup Final, losing to the eventual Stanley Cup champion New Jersey Devils. In 2003–04, Martin guided the team to another good regular season but again would lose in the first round of the playoffs to the Maple Leafs, leading to Martin's dismissal as management felt that a new coach was required for playoff success.

==== Bankruptcy and sale to Eugene Melnyk ====
In 2000, owner Bryden publicly appealed for tax relief from the Government of Canada for all Canadian NHL teams, coping with a significant drop in the Canadian dollar. His appeal was first met with a plan for tax relief, but the program was cancelled. Bryden then announced the sale of the club outright to a limited partnership in 2002 for CA$186 million, which would include creditors and Bryden himself. After its principal creditor Ogden Entertainment failed, the Senators entered bankruptcy protection in January 2003, owing CA$160 million for the club and CA$210 million for the arena. The deal fell through in 2003 when American investor Nelson Peltz declined to get involved.

In August 2003, pharmaceutical billionaire Eugene Melnyk purchased the club for a reported CA$130 million. Melnyk, principal shareholder of Biovail Pharmaceuticals, chose to finance half of the purchase price for the club and arena with debt. Share values of Biovail were depressed, and he did not want to sell them at the lower price.

=== Bryan Murray era (2004–2016) ===
After the playoff loss, owner Melnyk promised that changes were coming, and they came quickly. In June 2004, Anaheim Ducks general manager Bryan Murray of nearby Shawville became the head coach. That summer, the team also made substantial personnel changes, trading long-time players Patrick Lalime and Radek Bonk, and signing free agent goaltender Dominik Hašek. The team would not be able to show its new line-up for a year, as the 2004–05 NHL lock-out intervened and most players played in Europe or in the minors. In a final change, just before the 2005–06 season, the team traded long-time player Marián Hossa for Dany Heatley.

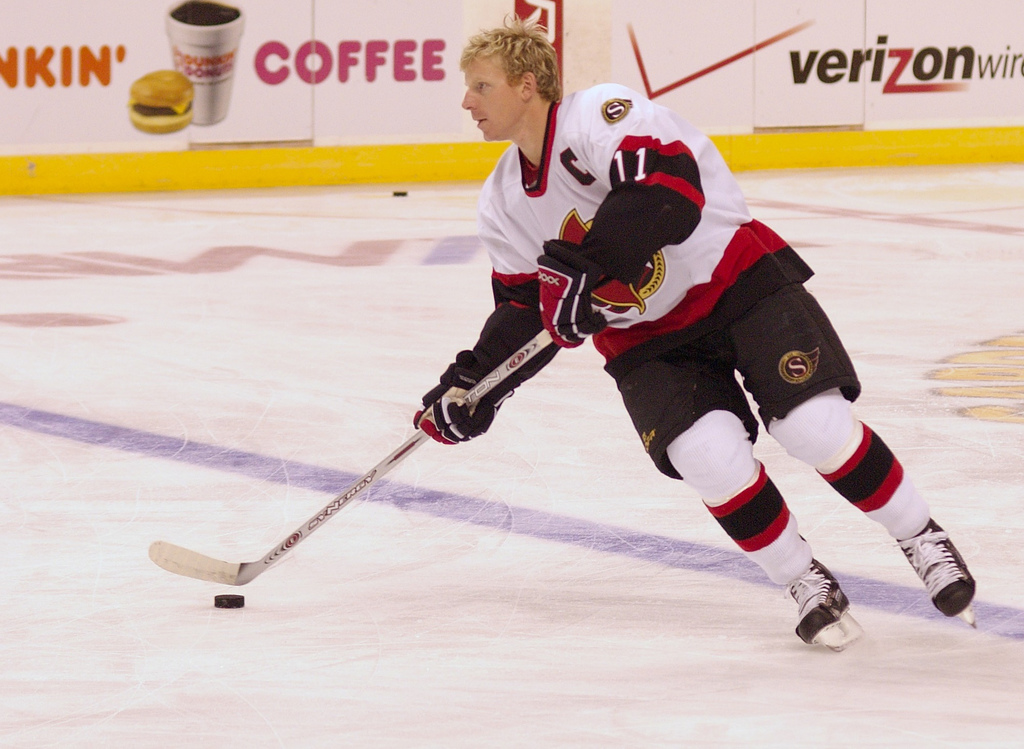
Daniel Alfredsson played together with Jason Spezza and Dany Heatley, forming the CASH line. They led the Senators to their first Stanley Cup Final appearance.

The media predicted the Senators to be Stanley Cup contenders in 2005–06, as they had a strong core of players returning. They played an up-tempo style that fit the new rule changes, and Hašek was expected to provide top-notch goaltending. The team rushed out of the gate, winning 19 of the first 22 games, in the end winning 52 games and 113 points, placing first in the conference, and second overall. The newly formed 'CASH' line of Alfredsson, Spezza, and Heatley established itself as one of the league's top offensive lines. Hašek played well until he was injured during the 2006 Winter Olympics, forcing the team to enter the playoffs with rookie netminder Ray Emery as their starter. Without Hašek, the club bowed out in a second-round loss to the Buffalo Sabres.

In 2006–07, the Senators reached the Stanley Cup Final after qualifying for the playoffs in nine consecutive seasons. The Senators had a high turn-over of personnel and the disappointment of 2006 to overcome and started the season poorly. Trade rumours swirled around Alfredsson for most of the last months of 2006. The team lifted itself out of last place in the division to nearly catch the Buffalo Sabres by season's end, placing fourth in the Eastern Conference. The team finished with 105 points, their fourth consecutive 100-point season and sixth in the last eight. In the playoffs, Ottawa continued its good play. Led by the 'CASH' line, goaltender Emery, and the strong defence of Phillips and Anton Volchenkov, the club defeated the Pittsburgh Penguins, the second-ranked New Jersey Devils and the top-ranked Sabres to advance to the Stanley Cup Final.

The 2006–07 Senators thus became the first Ottawa team to be in a Stanley Cup Final since 1927, and the city was swept up in the excitement. Businesses along all of the main streets posted large hand-drawn "Go Sens Go" signs, residents put up large displays in front of their homes or decorated their cars. A large Ottawa Senators flag was draped on the City Hall, along with a large video screen showing the games. A six-storey likeness of Alfredsson was hung on the Corel building. Rallies were held outside of City Hall, car rallies of decorated cars paraded through town and a section of downtown, dubbed the "Sens Mile", was closed off to traffic during and after games for fans to congregate.

In the Stanley Cup Final, the Senators faced the Anaheim Ducks, considered a favourite since the start of the season, a team the Senators had last played in 2006, and a team known for its strong defence. The Ducks won the first two games in Anaheim 3–2 and 1–0. Returning home, the Senators won game three 5–3 but lost game four 3–2. The Ducks won game five 6–2 in Anaheim to clinch the series and their first Stanley Cup championship. The Ducks had played outstanding defence, shutting down the 'CASH' line, forcing Murray to split up the line. The Ducks scored timely goals and Ducks' goaltender Jean-Sébastien Giguère out-played Emery.

In the off-season after the Stanley Cup Final, Murray's contract was expiring. At the same time, general manager Muckler had one season remaining and was expected to retire. Murray, who had previously been a general manager for other NHL clubs, was expected to take over the general manager position, although no public timetable was given. Owner Melnyk decided to offer Muckler another position in the organization and give the general manager position to Murray. Muckler declined the offer and was relieved from his position. Melnyk publicly justified the move, saying that he expected to lose Murray if his contract ran out. Murray then elevated John Paddock, the assistant coach, to head coach of the Senators. Under Paddock, the team came out to a record start to the 2007–08 season. However, team play declined to a .500 level, and the team was falling out of the playoffs. Paddock was fired by Murray, who took over coaching on an interim basis. The club managed to qualify for the playoffs by a tie-breaker but was swept in the first round of the playoffs by the Pittsburgh Penguins. In June, the club bought out goaltender Emery, who had become notorious for off-ice events in Ottawa and lateness to several team practices.

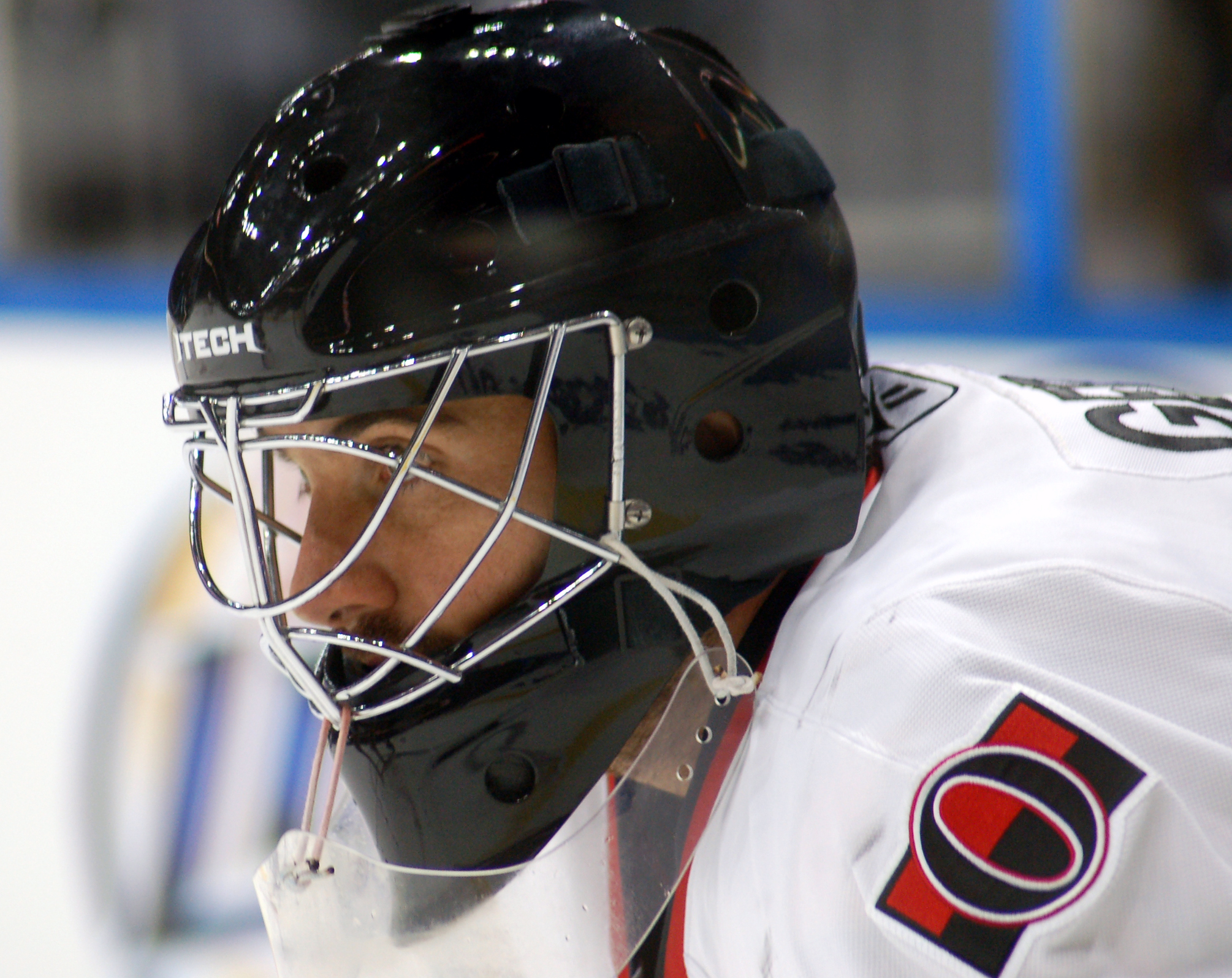
Martin Gerber was a goaltender for the Senators from 2006 to 2009.

For 2008–09, Murray hired Craig Hartsburg to coach the Senators. Under Hartsburg's style, the Senators struggled and played under .500. Uneven goaltending with Martin Gerber and Alex Auld meant the team played cautiously to protect the goaltender. Murray's patience ran out in February 2009, with the team well out of playoff contention, and Hartsburg was fired, although he had two years left on his contract, and the team also had Paddock under contract. Cory Clouston was elevated from the Binghamton coaching position. The team played above .500 under Clouston and rookie goaltender Brian Elliott, who had been promoted from Binghamton. Gerber was waived from the team at the trading deadline, and the team traded for goaltender Pascal Leclaire, although he would not play due to injury. The team failed to make the playoffs for the first time in 12 seasons. Auld would be traded in the off-season to make room. Clouston's coaching had caused a rift with Heatley (although unspecified "personal issues" were also noted by Heatley), and after Clouston was given a contract to continue coaching, Heatley made a trade demand and was traded to the San Jose Sharks just before the start of the 2009–10 season.

In 2009–10, the Senators were a .500 team until going on a team-record 11-game winning streak in January. The streak propelled the team to the top of the Northeast Division standings and a top-three placing for the playoffs. The team could not hold off the Sabres for the division lead but qualified for the playoffs in the fifth position. For the third season in four, the Senators played off against the Pittsburgh Penguins in the first round. A highlight for the Senators was winning a triple-overtime fifth game in Pittsburgh, but the team could not win a playoff game on home ice, losing the series in six games.

The Senators had a much poorer than expected 2010–11 campaign, resulting in constant rumours of a shakeup right through until December. The rumours were heightened in January after the team went on a lengthy losing streak. January was a dismal month for the Senators, winning only one game. Media speculated on the imminent firing of Clouston, Murray or both. Owner Melynk cleared the air in an article in the January 22, 2011 edition of the Ottawa Sun. Melnyk stated that he would not fire either Clouston or Murray but that he had given up on this season and was in the process of developing a plan for the future. On January 24, The Globe and Mail reported that the plan included hiring a new general manager before the June entry draft and that Murray would be retained as an advisor to the team. A decision on whether to retain Clouston would be made by the new general manager. The article by Roy MacGregor, a long-time reporter of the Ottawa Senators, stated that former assistant coach Pierre McGuire had already been interviewed. Murray, in a press conference that day, stated that he wished to stay on as the team's general manager. He also stated that Melnyk was allowing him to continue as the general manager without restraint. Murray said that the players were now to be judged by their play until the February 28 trade deadline. Murray would attempt to move "a couple, at least," of the players for draft picks or prospects at that time if the Senators remained out of playoff contention.

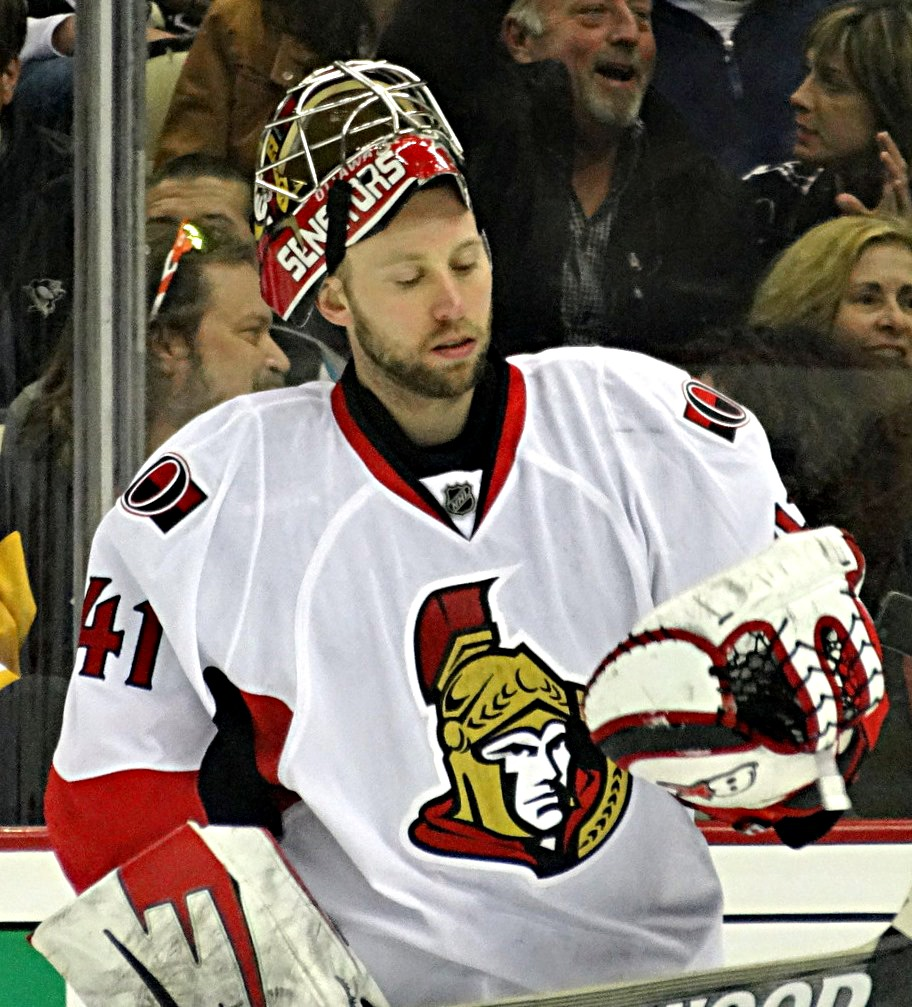
During the 2010–11 season, the Senators acquired Craig Anderson after swapping goaltenders with the Colorado Avalanche.

True to his word, Murray made a flurry of trades. He started his overhaul with the trading of Mike Fisher to the Nashville Predators. Fisher already had a home in Nashville with his wife Carrie Underwood. The trading of Fisher, a fan favourite in Ottawa, led to a small anti-Underwood backlash with the banning of her songs from the playlists of some local radio stations. Murray next traded veterans Chris Kelly, and Jarkko Ruutu. A swap of goaltenders was made with the Colorado Avalanche which brought Craig Anderson to Ottawa in exchange for Elliott, both goaltenders having sub-par years. Next, under-achieving forward Alex Kovalev was traded to the Pittsburgh Penguins. On trade deadline day, Ottawa picked up goaltender Curtis McElhinney on waivers. The team traded Chris Campoli with a seventh-round pick to the Chicago Blackhawks for a second-round pick and Ryan Potulny. Goaltender Anderson played very well down the stretch for Ottawa, and the team quickly signed the soon-to-be unrestricted free agent to a four-year contract. After media speculation on the future of Murray within the organization, Murray was re-signed as general manager on April 8 to a three-year extension. On April 9, head coach Clouston and assistants Greg Carvel and Brad Lauer were dismissed from their positions. Murray said that the decision was made based on the fact that the team entered the season believing it was a contender, but finished with a 32–40–10 record. Former Detroit Red Wings' assistant coach Paul MacLean was hired as Clouston's replacement on June 14, 2011.

As the 2011–12 season began, many hockey writers and commentators were convinced that the Senators would finish at or near the bottom of the NHL standings. While rebuilding, the Ottawa line-up contained many rookies and inexperienced players. The team struggled out of the gate, losing five of their first six games before a reversal of fortunes saw them win six games in a row. In December 2011, the team acquired forward Kyle Turris from the Phoenix Coyotes in exchange for highly regarded prospect David Rundblad and a draft pick. The team improved its play afterwards and moved into a playoff position before the All-Star Game. For the first time in Senators' history, the All-Star Game was held in Ottawa and considered a great success. Five Senators were voted in or named to the event, including Daniel Alfredsson, who was named the captain of one team. The team continued its playoff push after the break. After starting goaltender Anderson injured his hand in a kitchen accident at home, the Senators called up Robin Lehner from Binghamton and acquired highly regarded goaltender Ben Bishop from the St. Louis Blues. While Anderson recovered, the team continued its solid play and finished as the eighth seed in the Eastern Conference, drawing a first-round playoff matchup against the Conference champion New York Rangers. Ultimately, Ottawa lost the series in seven games.

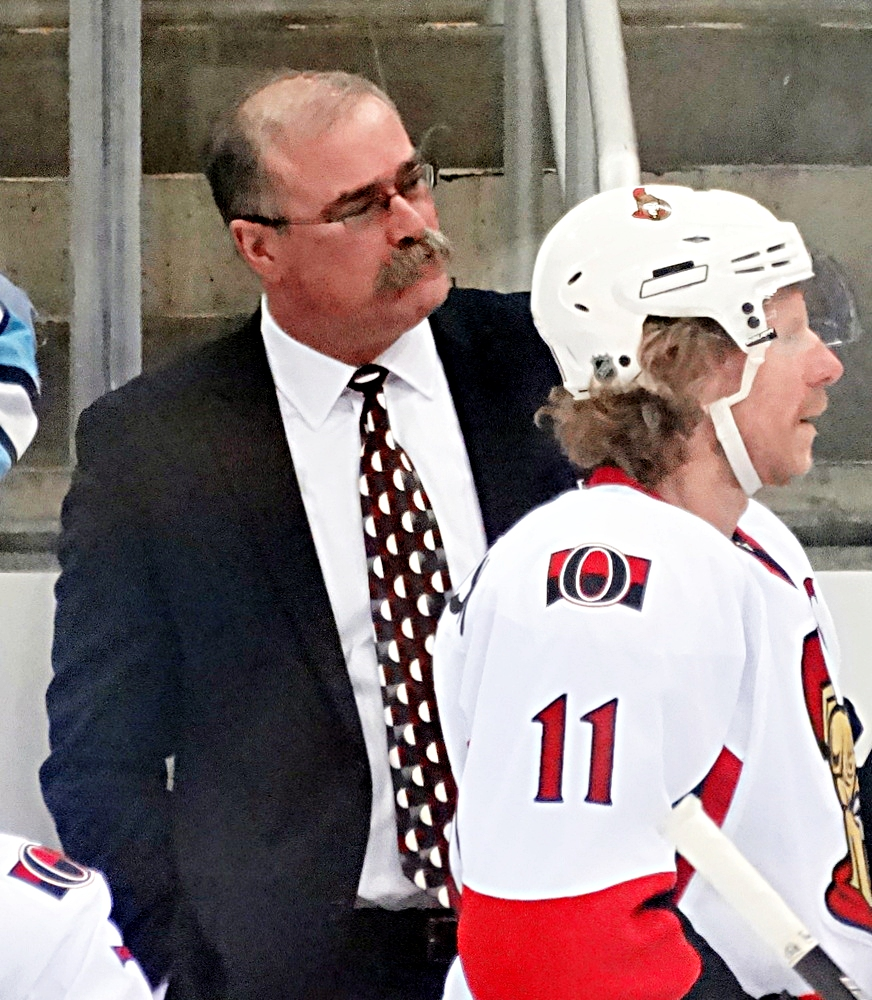
Paul MacLean was awarded the Jack Adams Award during the 2012–13 season. He was the Senators' head coach from 2011 to 2014.

The next season, Ottawa would be challenged to repeat the success they had in 2011–12 due to long-term injuries to key players such as Erik Karlsson, Jason Spezza, Milan Michálek and Craig Anderson. Despite these injuries, the Senators would finish seventh in the Eastern Conference and head coach Paul MacLean would go on to win the Jack Adams Award as the NHL's coach of the year. In a rivalry series, Ottawa defeated the second-seeded Montreal Canadiens in the first round of the playoffs in five games, blowing out Montreal 6–1 in games three and five. This was the first Montreal-Ottawa playoff series since Ottawa joined the league and the first between the cities' teams since the original Senators played the Canadiens in 1927. The Senators could not repeat the upset, losing to the top-seeded Pittsburgh Penguins in five games in the second round.

July 5, 2013, would be a day of mixed emotions for the city and fans, as long-time captain Alfredsson signed a one-year contract with the Detroit Red Wings, leaving Ottawa after 17 seasons with the Senators and 14 as captain after a contract dispute. The signing shocked numerous fans across the city and many within the Senators organization. The day finished optimistically, however, as Murray acquired star forward Bobby Ryan from the Anaheim Ducks, hoping Ryan could replace Alfredsson on the top line with Spezza. Murray would also sign free-agent forward Clarke MacArthur to a two-year contract that same day and bring back former defenceman Joe Corvo to a one-year contract three days later on July 8, 2013.

For the 2013–14 season, the league realigned and Ottawa was assigned to the new Atlantic Division along with the rest of the old Northeast Division and the Detroit Red Wings, formerly of the Western Conference. The re-alignment brought increased competition to qualify for the playoffs, as there were now 16 teams in the Eastern Conference fighting for eight playoff spots. The season began with a changing of leadership, as on September 14, 2013, the Ottawa Senators named Spezza their eighth captain in franchise history. While new addition Clarke MacArthur had a career year, Ryan and Spezza struggled to find chemistry, and Ryan was moved to a line with MacArthur and Kyle Turris. Corvo lost his place in the line-up and was waived. The team outside of a playoff position, Murray bolstered the club with a trade for flashy right-winger Aleš Hemský from the Edmonton Oilers. The club, however, was eliminated from playoff contention in the last week of the season, finishing five points short. Further disappointment ensued as the team lost Hemský to free agency and Spezza requested a trade out of Ottawa, ending the era of the stars of the 2007 Stanley Cup Final team. Spezza agreed to be traded to the Dallas Stars and was sent with Ludwig Karlsson for Alex Chiasson, Nick Paul, Alex Guptill and a 2015 second-round pick.

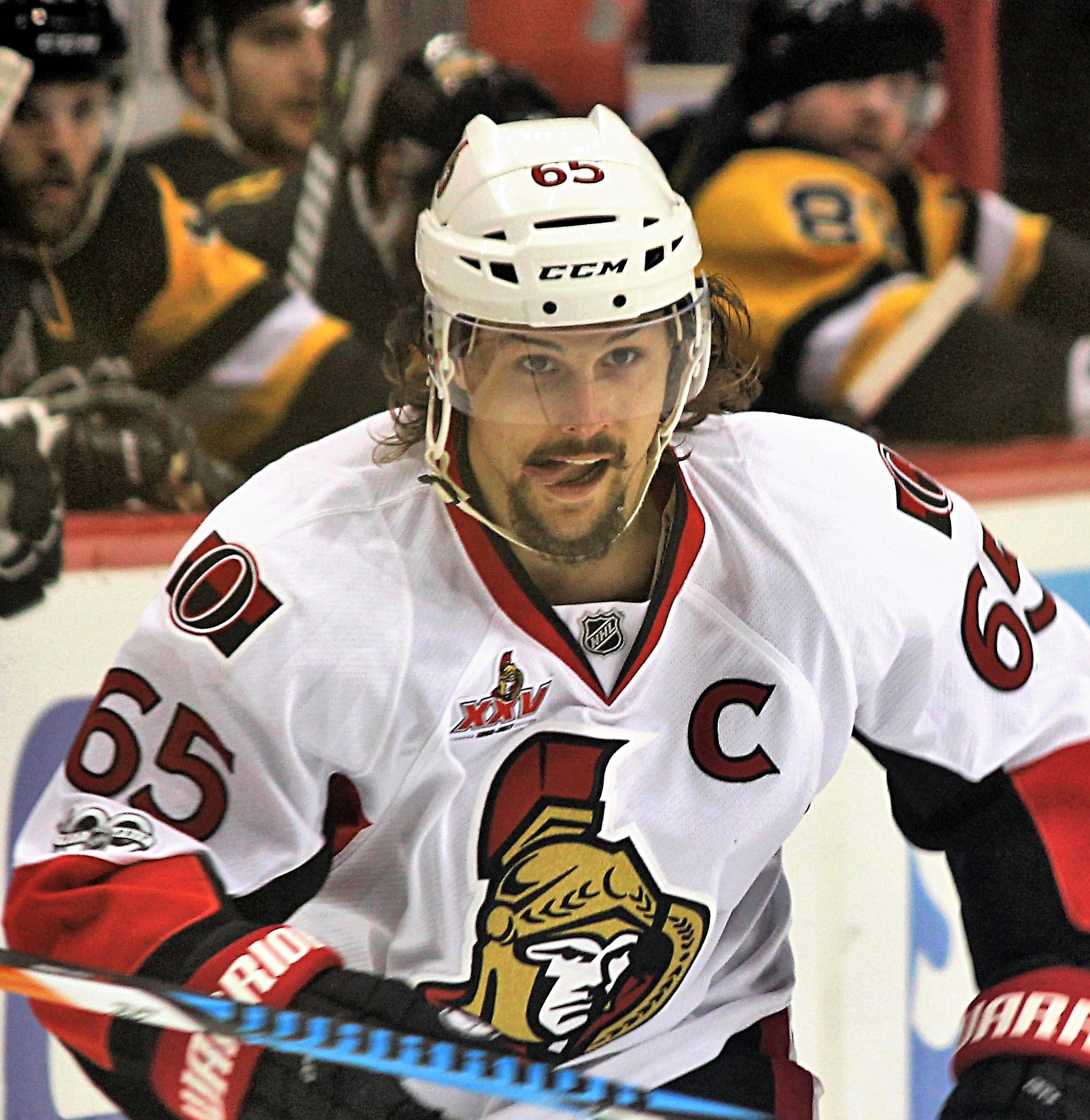
Erik Karlsson was team captain through the 2014–15 to 2017–18 seasons.

At the beginning of the 2014–15 season, Karlsson was named the franchise's ninth captain and the club signed Ryan to a seven-year extension. Unhappy with an 11–11–5 record after 27 games, the Senators fired head coach MacLean and replaced him with assistant coach Dave Cameron. The change turned the season around for the Senators, who won 32 of their last 55 games. After both Senators' goalies Anderson and Lehner were injured, the team turned to Binghamton goaltender Andrew Hammond. Hammond, aka 'The Hamburglar,' would compile a record of 20–1–2, a goals-against average of 1.79, and a save percentage of .941 to get the team back into playoff position. The Senators became the first team in modern NHL history to overcome a 14-point deficit at any juncture of the season to qualify for the playoffs. However, the Senators lost to the Canadiens in six games in the first round of the playoffs.

During the 2014–15 season, it was announced that Murray had cancer. Taking regular treatment, Murray chose to stay on as general manager through the 2015–16 season. Despite posting the best record of any Canadian team in the league, the Senators failed to make the playoffs in what was considered a disappointing season (all seven Canadian teams missed the playoffs). Murray made one 'blockbuster' nine-player trade that brought Toronto Maple Leafs' captain Dion Phaneuf to the Senators before the trade deadline. The Senators were outside of a playoff position at the time of the deal, and played well until the end of the season, but fell just short, placing fifth in the division.

=== Pierre Dorion era (2016–2023) ===
On April 10, 2016, the day after the final game of the 2015–16 season, Murray announced his resignation as general manager and that he would continue in an advisory role with the club. Assistant general manager Pierre Dorion was promoted to the general manager position. On April 12, the Senators fired head coach Cameron. On May 8, 2016, the Senators hired former Tampa Bay Lightning head coach Guy Boucher as their new head coach. On the following day, Marc Crawford was announced as associate coach. On June 13, 2016, the Senators hired Daniel Alfredsson as the senior advisor of hockey operations. In June 2016, the Senators hired Rob Cookson as an assistant coach, who had worked with both Boucher and Crawford in Switzerland, and Pierre Groulx as a goaltending coach.

The Senators finished second in the Atlantic Division during the 2016–17 season. They faced the Boston Bruins in the first round of the playoffs, winning that series in six games. In the second round, they defeated the New York Rangers in six games. During the second game of that series, Jean-Gabriel Pageau scored four goals, including the game-winning goal in double overtime. The Senators would come within one win of the Stanley Cup Final having lost in double overtime of the seventh game of their conference finals series against the Pittsburgh Penguins, who went on to win their second consecutive Stanley Cup.

Following their appearance in the conference finals the previous season, the Senators lost defenceman Marc Methot to the 2017 NHL expansion draft. On November 5, 2017, the Senators conducted a blockbuster trade with the Colorado Avalanche, bringing in star forward Matt Duchene from the Avalanche in exchange for Kyle Turris, Shane Bowers, Andrew Hammond, a conditional first-round pick in 2018 or 2019 and a third-round pick in 2019. Following the trade, however, the Senators' season began to fall apart with a disastrous November road trip. A season highlight was hosting the NHL 100 Classic game outdoors at the TD Place Stadium football field versus the Montreal Canadiens. The game marked the centennial of the first Montreal-Ottawa game in the NHL. The Senators won the game 3–0, but the festival atmosphere was somewhat marred by owner Melnyk's controversial comments to the press about attendance levels and selling or moving the team. Out of the playoff picture, the Senators chose to trade away veteran players. Forward Derick Brassard and defenceman Phaneuf were dealt at the trade deadline to the Pittsburgh Penguins and Los Angeles Kings, respectively. The Senators finished the year second-to-last in the league with a 28–43–11 record and 67 points, their fourth-worst season since entering the league.

During the 2018 off-season, the Senators began what would end up being a complete rebuild. They traded forward Mike Hoffman to the San Jose Sharks, who later that day flipped him to the Florida Panthers. The Senators ended up with the fourth-overall pick in the 2018 draft due to their poor record. Under the Matt Duchene trade conditions, they either had to give up the pick to the Avalanche or wait a year and surrender their 2019 first-round pick instead. The Senators elected to keep the pick and selected forward Brady Tkachuk fourth overall. Just before the regular season started, the Senators traded their captain, Erik Karlsson, to the San Jose Sharks for a large package of players and draft picks.

After a miserable start to the 2018–19 season, the Senators were unable to re-sign forwards Duchene, Mark Stone, and Ryan Dzingel before the trade deadline. In an attempt to create optimism, owner Melnyk famously stated: "The Senators will be all-in again for a five-year run of unparalleled success–where the team will plan to spend close to the NHL's salary cap every year from 2021 to 2025. The Senators' current rebuild is a blueprint on how to bring the Stanley Cup home to its rightful place in Ottawa." All three players were subsequently traded before the 2019 trade deadline. Duchene and Dzingel were traded to the Columbus Blue Jackets in exchange for draft picks, prospects and Anthony Duclair. In contrast, fan favourite Stone was traded to the Vegas Golden Knights in exchange for prospect Erik Brännström, forward Oscar Lindberg and a second-round pick. Just days after trading away the team's three leading scorers, it was announced that the plans for a new downtown arena on the open land at LeBreton Flats had fallen through. The Ottawa Citizen called it "one of the gloomiest weeks in the history of the Ottawa Senators." On March 1, 2019, with the team in 31st place, head coach Boucher was fired with associate coach Marc Crawford taking over as head coach for the remainder of the season. The 2018–19 season saw the team finish last in the NHL without their own first-round draft pick. This marked the first time since 1995–96 that the Senators missed back-to-back playoff appearances.

Prior to the 2019–20 season, D. J. Smith was hired as the new head coach while the organization shifted its focus to developing its young players. The season was ultimately cut short due to the COVID-19 pandemic, and the Senators finished second last in the NHL with 62 points in 71 games. In contrast, Ottawa's farm team, the Belleville Senators, put together a very impressive, albeit shortened season led by Ottawa's top prospects, which included Josh Norris, Drake Batherson, Alex Formenton and Erik Brännström among others. Meanwhile, the San Jose Sharks suffered an unexpected collapse that year which significantly benefited the Senators who had acquired their first-round draft pick in the Karlsson trade. Ottawa found themselves with the third and fifth picks in the 2020 NHL draft and used them to select highly touted prospects Tim Stützle and Jake Sanderson.

The Senators would miss the playoffs again for the 2020–21 season, a season overshadowed by the COVID-19 pandemic. The young team played an all-Canadian shortened season, during which they had a poor record to start the season but finished the season with a strong stretch of play, inspiring some optimism for the future. The Senators again traded away veterans at the trade deadline for draft picks.

Before the 2021–22 season, general manager Dorion's contract was extended until 2025. He proceeded to declare: "The rebuild is done. Now we're stepping into another zone." His claims, however, did not materialize as the Senators got off to a slow start and were quickly out of the playoff picture. On October 17, 2021, Tkachuk signed a seven-year deal after a dramatic contract holdout. Just under three weeks later, he was named the tenth captain in franchise history at just 22 years of age. Tkachuk was, at the time, the franchise's youngest-ever captain.

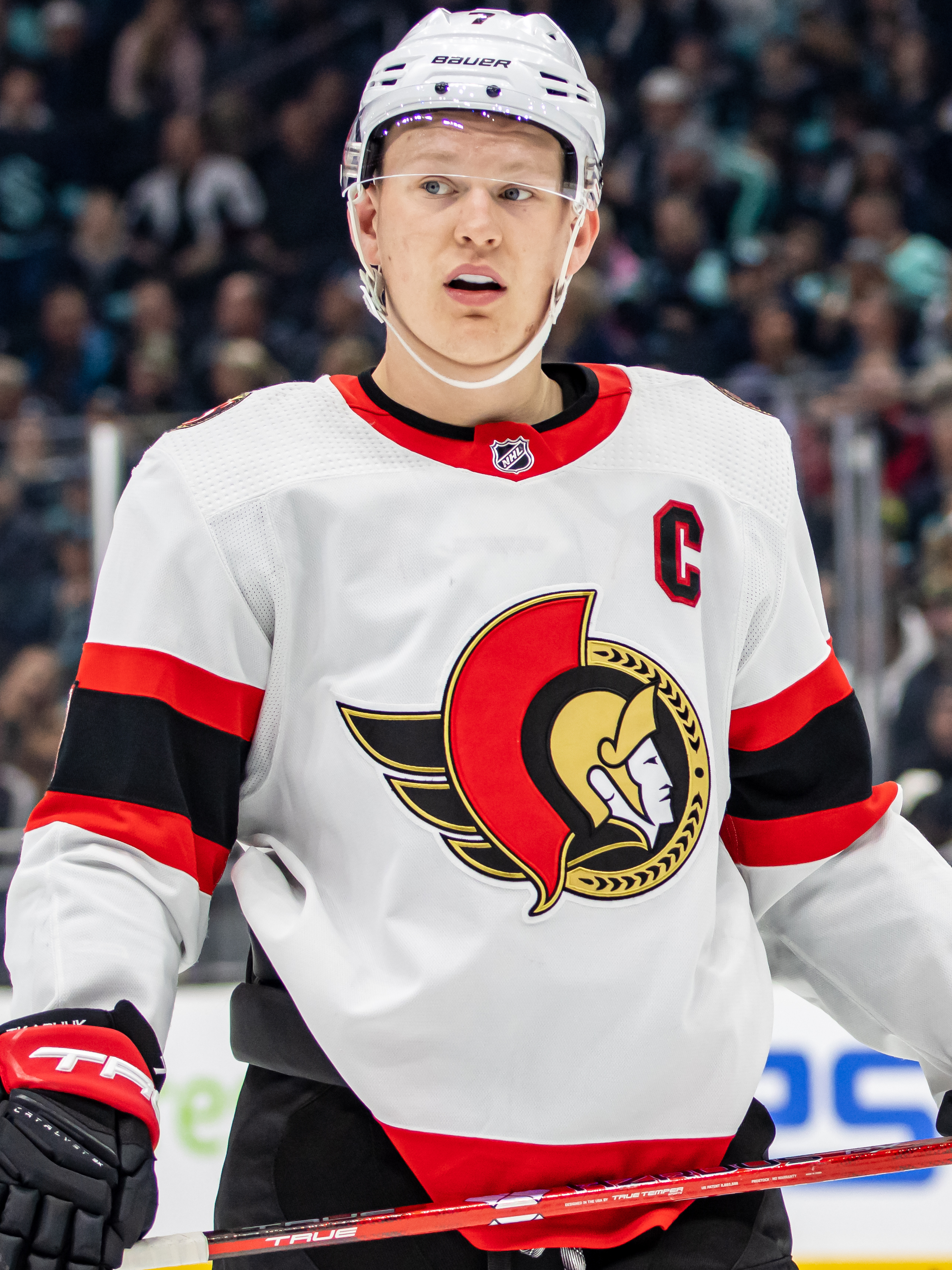
Former captain Brady Tkachuk

Ahead of the 2022–23 season, the team was aggressive in their efforts to exit their rebuild, drastically retooling the team through the acquisitions of forwards Alex DeBrincat and Claude Giroux and goaltender Cam Talbot. In addition, the team signed forwards Norris and Stützle to eight-year contract extensions. At the end of the season, the Senators missed the playoffs by six points.

Before the 2023–24 season, DeBrincat notified the Senators he would not re-sign long-term with the club and was traded to Detroit. Talbot was not re-signed. Instead, the Senators signed free agents – goaltender Joonas Korpisalo and forward Vladimir Tarasenko. At the start of the 2023–24 season, the NHL levied the forfeiture of a first-round pick due to negligence on the part of the Senators involving the trade of Evgeni Dadonov. Dorion resigned as general manager upon being asked to step down. After an 11–15–0 start to the season, the Senators fired coach Smith on December 18, 2023 and former head coach Martin, who had been serving as a senior advisor stepped in as interim coach until the end of the season.

=== Death of owner Eugene Melnyk and sale ===
Owner Eugene Melnyk died in March 2022 due to an unspecified illness. In statements in recent years, Melnyk had said that he planned to leave the team to his two daughters Olivia and Anna when he had been asked if he intended to sell the team. However, there had been speculation about ownership changes. The team added an 'EM' patch on the jersey for the rest of the season. In November 2022, the team engaged a New York City investment banker to facilitate a sale of the team. The Senators confirmed the planned sale in a press release on November 5, with a condition of sale being that the team remain in Ottawa. On June 13, 2023, the Senators announced that a purchase agreement had been signed with a group of investors headed by Michael Andlauer, a Toronto businessman and part-owner of the Montreal Canadiens. Andlauer became majority owner along with his partners, Eugene Melnyk's daughters, and a group of Canadian businessmen on September 21, 2023.

=== Andlauer era ===
After Andlauer took over the franchise, he set about making changes. Cyril Leeder, who had previously served as the team's chief executive officer (CEO) from 2009 to 2017 was brought back as the CEO in September 2023. On September 29, former player Steve Staios was named president of hockey operations. After Dorion's failure to disclose contract information led to the NHL penalizing the team a first-round draft pick, he resigned. Dorion was replaced as general manager on an interim basis by Staios. Staios was later named permanent general manager and another former NHL player, Dave Poulin, was named senior vice president of hockey operations to assist Staios in December.

During the off-season after the 2023–24 season, the Senators announced the hiring of former Canucks and Devils head coach Travis Green. Green's first season behind the Senators' bench got off to a shaky start, and by the middle of the 2024–25 season the team was 28th in the league. The team improved its position as the season progressed and clinched its first playoff berth to end an eight-year drought. Green became the first head coach to lead the Senators to the postseason since the 2016–17 season. In the playoffs, the Senators faced off against the Toronto Maple Leafs in the first postseason installment of the Battle of Ontario since the 2004 playoffs. The Maple Leafs began the series with a 3–0 series lead, but the Senators would win the next two games before being eliminated in six games.

On August 27, 2025, it was announced that the Allen Americans of the ECHL will once again be an official minor-league affiliate of the team, as well as the Belleville Senators of the AHL starting with the 2025–26 season.

On April 11, 2026, the Senators clinched a spot in the Stanley Cup playoffs for the second year in a row. This marked the first time since the 2011–12 and 2012–13 seasons that the team has clinched consecutive playoff appearances. They were eliminated by the Carolina Hurricanes in a four-game sweep. After the season, it was revealed that the team's captain, Brady Tkachuk, had requested a trade and on June 21, he was shipped to the Florida Panthers for a package of draft picks. One of those draft picks was later flipped to the San Jose Sharks in a trade for forwards William Eklund and Kasper Halttunen and prospect Brandon Svoboda on June 23.

== Rivalries ==
=== Toronto Maple Leafs ===
The Battle of Ontario is a rivalry with the Toronto Maple Leafs. It is the current version of an old rivalry between Ottawa, Canada's capital, and Toronto, Canada's largest city and business capital. The teams compete in the same division and meet frequently during regular season games. In the early 2000s, the teams met four consecutive times in the playoffs with Toronto winning all four series.

As of the end of the 2024–25 season, Ottawa leads the regular season series 76–55–3–13, while Toronto leads 20–10 in the playoff record.

=== Montreal Canadiens ===
There is a long-standing Ottawa-Montreal rivalry (dating back to the 1800s) in multiple sports including ice hockey. Today, both teams compete in the Atlantic Division. There is only a two-hour drive from Montreal to Ottawa via Quebec Autoroute 40 and Ontario Highway 417, plus railway and air connections. When the teams play in Ottawa, "the games matter" according to sports writer Wayne Scanlan of the Ottawa Citizen, and many Canadiens fans turn out in Montreal jerseys. The current rivalry began when the Ottawa Senators' first NHL game was held in Ottawa on October 8, 1992, where the expansion Senators beat the Canadiens 5–3. That victory was one of the only Senators' highlights of their inaugural season; they won only nine more games the rest of the season to finish with 10 wins and 24 points, while the Canadiens won their 24th Stanley Cup that season. Another regular season highlight of the rivalry was the NHL 100 Classic played at TD Place Stadium outdoors in Ottawa in December 2017, celebrating the centennial of the first NHL game between the original Senators and the Canadiens.

The rivalry existed prior to the teams meeting in the playoffs, especially as the teams both became competitive in the early 2000s and Ottawa's captain Alfredsson was among those who hoped for a playoff series between the two. The hoped-for playoff series finally came in 2013. In that series, there were a large number of controversial events. In game one, Ottawa's Eric Gryba laid out Montreal's Lars Eller in an open ice hit. After the game, the Senators' head coach MacLean blamed Raphael Diaz for a suicide pass. Later, Canadiens' coach Michel Therrien responded and said that what MacLean said was a "lack of respect." Ottawa won that game 4–2. Brandon Prust later insulted MacLean after the game, saying that he doesn't care what that "bug-eyed, fat walrus has to say." In game three, there was a full line brawl between Ottawa and Montreal. And later in that game, MacLean called a timeout with 17 seconds left in the third period with a 6–1 lead. Therrien called Maclean classless while Maclean responded by saying that he was protecting his players from Montreal's dirty play in that game. The Senators eventually won the series 4–1.

Two years later, the rivalry was renewed in another playoff series. In game one, Montreal's P. K. Subban slashed Ottawa's Stone – breaking his wrist – and Subban was later ejected. Senators' coach Dave Cameron called the slash vicious and said that Subban deserved a suspension. Ottawa's Clarke MacArthur called it a 'lumberjack slash', and Stone said that he was being targeted all game. Meanwhile, Therrien said that Subban did not deserve to be ejected and should have only gotten a minor penalty. The Canadiens won that game 4–3. The Canadiens won the next two games in overtime. Riding a 3–0 lead in the series, the Canadiens saw Ottawa win the next two games, before closing the series in game six with a 2–0 victory in Ottawa.

As of the end of the 2024–25 season, Montreal leads the current Ottawa Senators in the regular season series 82–73–5–11, while Ottawa leads 6–5 in the playoff record.

== Home rinks ==
=== Ottawa Civic Centre ===
The Senators' first home arena was the Ottawa Civic Centre (now TD Place Arena), located on Bank Street in Ottawa, where they played from the 1992–93 season to January of the 1995–96 season. The arena, used by the junior Ottawa 67's, was renovated for the Senators, including adding press boxes and luxury boxes. They played their first home game on October 8, 1992, against the Montreal Canadiens with much pre-game spectacle. The Senators would defeat the Canadiens 5–3. Their last game in the arena was on December 31, 1995, versus the Tampa Bay Lightning.

=== Canadian Tire Centre ===
As part of its bid to land an NHL franchise for Ottawa, Terrace Corporation unveiled the original proposal for the arena development at a press conference in September 1989. The proposal included a hotel and 20,500-seat arena, named The Palladium, on 100 acres (0.40 km^{2}), surrounded by a 500-acre (2.0 km^{2}) mini-city, named "West Terrace." The site itself, 600 acres (2.4 km^{2}) of farmland, on the western border of Kanata, had been acquired in May 1987 from farmer Cyril Bennett for CA$1 million, and flipped to Terrace for CA$2.6 million in 1989. Rezoning approval was granted by the Ontario Municipal Board on August 28, 1991, with conditions. The conditions imposed by the board included scaling down the arena to 18,500 seats, a moratorium on development outside the initial 100-acre (0.40 km^{2}) arena site, and that the cost of the highway interchange with Highway 417 be paid by Terrace. A two-year period was spent seeking financing for the site and interchange by Terrace Corporation. The corporation received a CA$6 million grant from the Government of Canada but needed to borrow to pay for the rest of the costs of construction. A ground-breaking ceremony was held in June 1992, but construction did not start until July 7, 1994. Actual construction took 18 months, finishing in January 1996.

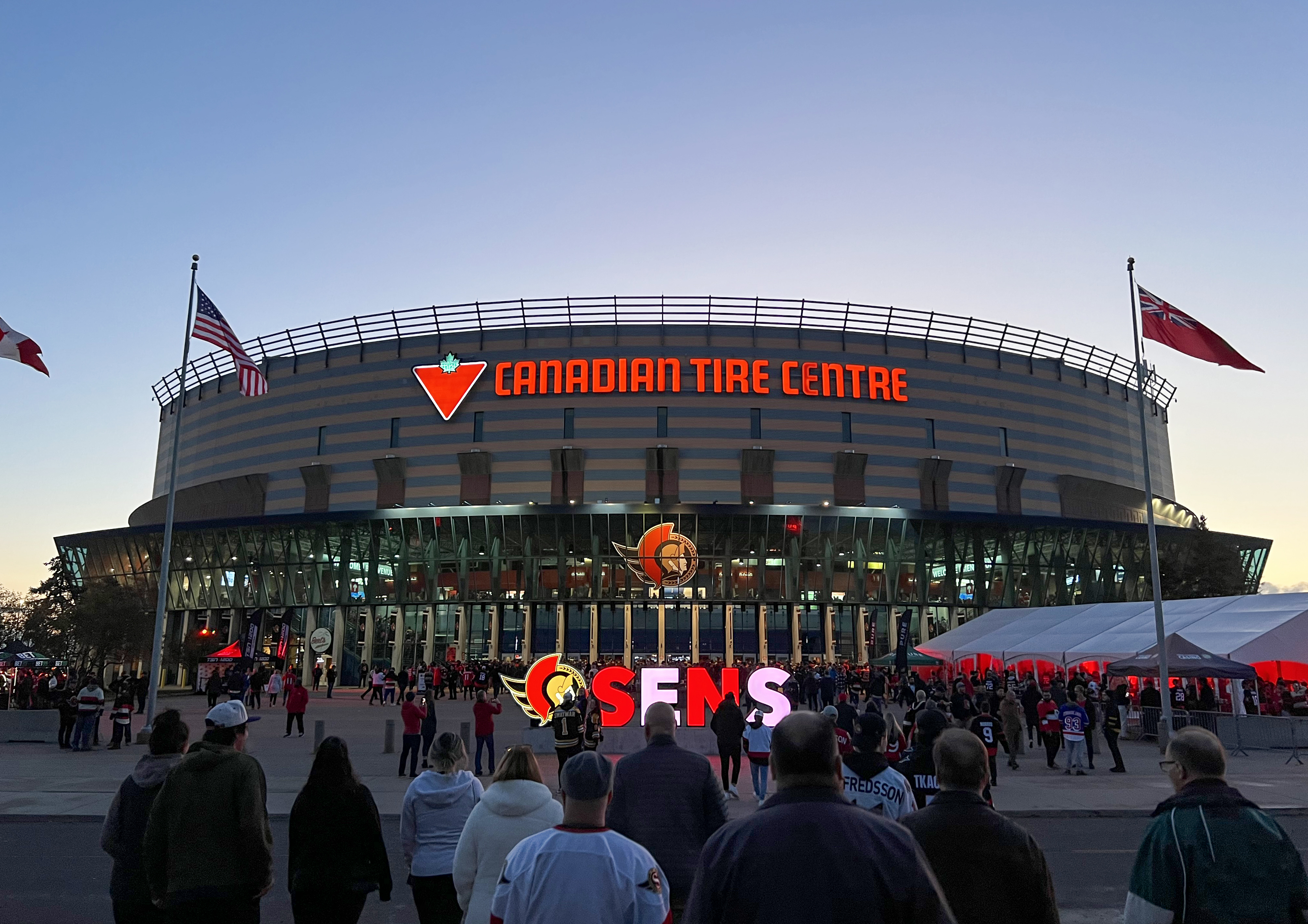
The Senators moved to Canadian Tire Centre in 1996. The arena is their second and current home arena.

The Palladium opened on January 15, 1996, with a concert by Canadian rocker Bryan Adams. The Senators played their first game in their new arena two days later, falling 3–0 to the Montreal Canadiens. On February 17, 1996, the name 'Palladium' was changed to 'Corel Centre' when Corel Corporation, an Ottawa software company, signed a twenty-year deal for the naming rights.

When mortgage holder Covanta Energy (the former Ogden Entertainment) went into receivership in 2001, Terrace was expected to pay off its debt to Covanta in full. The ownership could not refinance the arena, eventually leading Terrace itself to declare bankruptcy in 2002. On August 26, 2003, billionaire businessman Eugene Melnyk finalized the purchase of the Senators and the arena. The arena and club became solely owned by Melnyk through a new company, Capital Sports & Entertainment.

In 2004, the ownership applied to expand its seating, and the City of Ottawa amended its by-laws for the venue, increasing its seating capacity in 2005 to 19,153 and total attendance capacity to 20,500, including standing room.

On January 19, 2006, the arena became known as 'Scotiabank Place' after Melnyk reached a new 15-year naming agreement with Canadian bank Scotiabank on January 11, 2006, ending the 20-year contract with Corel. Scotiabank had been an advertising partner with the club for several years and a financial partner with owner Melnyk, and signed a CA$20 million over 15-years deal; a slight increase over Corel's contract. While Corel was no longer the arena name sponsor, it continued as an advertising sponsor.

In 2011, in time for the Senators hosting the NHL All-Star Game, the team installed a new video scoreboard, known as the 'Bell HD' screen, made by Panasonic. The new scoreboard increased the video display from 700 square feet (65 m^{2}) to 2,170 square feet (202 m^{2}) and added LED rings.

On June 18, 2013, the Senators and Scotiabank ended the seven-year naming rights deal. The Ottawa Senators announced a marketing agreement with the Canadian Tire retail store chain, and as a result, the arena was renamed Canadian Tire Centre on July 1, 2013.

=== Downtown arena proposal ===
In 2015, the National Capital Commission (NCC) put out a request for proposals to redevelop the LeBreton Flats area in downtown Ottawa, a longtime vacant former industrial area. In 2016, the NCC settled on the proposal presented by Senators owner Eugene Melnyk and the RendezVous LeBreton Group partnership with Trinity Developments. The proposal included housing units, park space, a recreation facility, a library and a new arena for the Ottawa Senators.

The plan to build a new arena downtown came apart in late 2018 after it was revealed that the Senators were suing Trinity for CA$700 million in damages. Trinity was developing a site adjacent to the LeBreton Flats site, and the Senators felt this was inappropriate competition. Trinity responded with a CA$1 billion lawsuit, accusing the Senators of being unwilling to contribute any money to the project. The NCC announced the cancellation of the partnership's bid to develop the site but gave the sides an extension when the two parties agreed to mediation. On February 27, 2019, it was announced that mediation between the parties had failed to come to an agreement and that the NCC would explore other options for the site's redevelopment.

The NCC resumed the process to redevelop the overall site, reserving the site of the arena and asking for preliminary bids on the arena site separately. After a February 2022 deadline to submit bids, the NCC announced that it had received several bids for the site. Local media speculated that the Senators were actively pursuing a bid, authorized by Melnyk shortly before his death. On June 23, 2022, the NCC announced that the Senators proposal had been chosen for the site, with a lease agreement expected to be put in place by autumn of 2023. In related business, the outstanding lawsuits around the previous LeBreton bid were settled out of court in December 2022.

In 2024, the Senators stated that it would be "several years" before construction would start. The Senators under Andlauer reviewed other possibilities before concluding that they would like to instead purchase the site, and possibly expand the site they could develop as an entertainment destination. In September 2024, the Senators and the NCC agreed to expand the site to 10 acres (4.0 ha) from 6 acres, but the purchase has not been concluded. A land sale agreement, for LeBreton Flats, was signed in August 2025 with the NCC.

=== Practice facility ===
The Senators practice facility is known as the Bell Sensplex, a CA$25.6 million joint venture with the City of Ottawa. Located southeast of the Canadian Tire Centre, the facility has three NHL-sized rinks, an Olympics-size rink and a fieldhouse that opened in 2004. It is used for Senators' practices, minor hockey and it is also the home of the annual minor hockey league Bell Capital Cup tournament.

== Team identity ==
The Senators organization is located in a bilingual marketplace and operates in both English and French. The City of Ottawa provides services in English and French and the Ottawa–Gatineau census metropolitan area contains a mix of anglophones and francophones. Longstanding Senators policy calls for providing services and marketing in both English and French to its bilingual fanbase. A bilingual version of the Canadian national anthem is sung before home games, and all announcements are in both languages. It has been estimated that 40 percent of season ticket holders are francophone. Senators games are broadcast on both the English-language TSN and the French-language RDS networks, in a long-standing agreement with Bell Media.

=== Logo and jersey design ===
The team colours are black, red and white with gold trim. Except for the gold, the colours match the colours of the original Senators. The team's home jersey is black with red trim, while the away jersey is white with black and red trim. The club's logo is the head of a Roman general, a member of the Senate of the Roman Republic in a gold semi-circle. The original logo, unveiled on May 23, 1991, described the general as a "centurion figure, strong and prominent" according to its designer, Tony Milchard. The logo was criticized by fans, and the designer hoped that people would "grow to like it".

The Senators jersey has an 'S' winged shoulder crest, with 'Est. 1894 (in Roman numerals)', the year (in error) believed at the time (1991) to be the year of the establishment of the original Senators. The original Senators were actually founded in 1883. This 'S' secondary logo was used from the 1992-93 season through 2006-2007 and was reintroduced in 2020 with slightly different coloration and continues to be used.

From 1992 to 1995, the Senators' primary road jerseys were black with red stripes. The numbers were red for the first season but switched to white afterward. White stripes were added to the uniform in 1995. The white uniforms, worn on home games until 2003 and on road games until 2007, featured black sleeves, tail stripes with red accents, and black lettering. In 1997, the Senators unveiled a red third jersey. It featured the first iteration of the "forward-facing" centurion logo, designed by Kevin Caradonna, head of the team's graphic design department, who also designed the mascot "Spartacat." The jersey became the team's primary dark jersey starting in 1999. From 2000 to 2007, the Senators also wore a black alternate jersey with gold, red and white accents.

The Senators' primary logo from 2007–08 until 2019–20

A new jersey design was unveiled on August 22, 2007, in conjunction with the league-wide adoption of the Rbk EDGE jerseys by Reebok for the 2007–08 season. The jersey incorporates the original Senators' 'O' logo as a shoulder patch. At the same time, the team updated its logos and switched its usage. The primary logo, which, according to team owner Eugene Melnyk, "represents strength and determination" is an update of the old secondary logo.

Before the 2008–09 season, the Senators unveiled a new black third jersey featuring the shortened "SENS" moniker in front. The centurion logo adorns the shoulders, and the striping was inspired by the team's original black jerseys.

In 2011, the Senators introduced a throwback-inspired third jersey design. Predominantly black, the jersey incorporated horizontal striping intended to be reminiscent of the original Senators' 'barber-pole' designs. Shield-type patches were added to the shoulders. The design of the shield-type patches was meant to be similar to the shield patches that the original Senators added to their jerseys after each Stanley Cup championship win. The patches spell the team name, one in English and one in French. The design was a collaborative effort between the Senators and a fan in Gatineau, Quebec, who had been circulating a version of it on the internet since 2009. The black third jerseys served as the basis of the Senators' 2014 Heritage Classic jerseys, which used cream as the base colour.

In 2017, the Senators' jerseys received a slight makeover when Adidas replaced Reebok as the NHL's uniform provider. The number font was changed to match those of their recent third jerseys, which were retired after the 2016–17 season. Before the 2018–19 season, the Senators brought back the red jerseys worn during the NHL 100 Classic as a third jersey. The design featured a silver "O" in front with black trim amid horizontal black, silver and white stripes.

In 2020, the Senators reintroduced its 1997–2007 logo with the jersey set used from 1992 to 1995. The updated logo uses a gold outline as opposed to red. The new uniforms, while largely resembling the originals from the 1990s, retained the lettering font used since the Adidas takeover. In contrast, the white uniforms retained only the black and red stripes along the upper arm sleeves. Both the home and away uniforms include a red band across the very bottom of the jerseys. In addition, the Senators unveiled a "Reverse Retro" alternate uniform; the design was of the original 1992–93 uniform but with red as the base colour. In the 2022–23 season, the Senators wore "Reverse Retro" uniforms based on the alternates they wore from 1997 to 2007, but with the current 2-D logo in front, black as the base colour and less white elements.

Prior to the 2025–26 season, the Senators unveiled a red alternate uniform, again using the primary logo as the crest along with gold and black stripes along the waist, shoulders and sleeves.

=== Arena entertainment ===
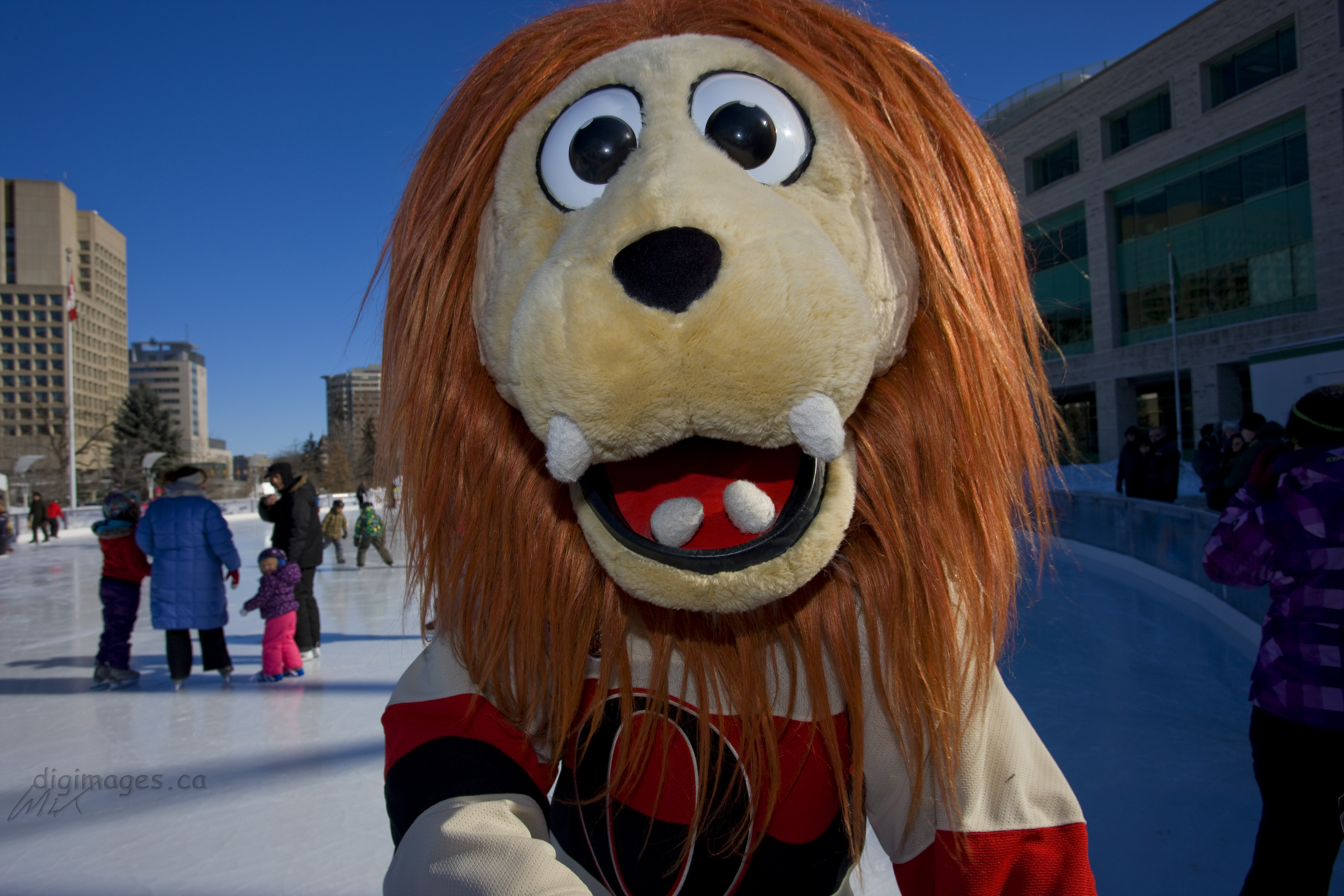
Spartacat is the official mascot for the Ottawa Senators.

At many home games, the fans are entertained both outside and inside the Canadian Tire Centre with myriad entertainers – live music, DJs, giveaways and promotions. The live music includes the traditional Scottish music of the 'Sons of Scotland Pipe Band' of Ottawa, along with highland dancers. Before and during games, entertainment is hosted by Spartacat, the official mascot of the Senators, an anthropomorphic lion. He made his debut on the Senators' opening night: October 8, 1992. During intermissions, the entertainment varies with on-ice contests, youth games, t-shirt giveaways, live bands and DJs. At each game, a selected fan rides one of the on-ice resurfacers ("Zambonis"). The team's public address announcer is Jonathan Trottier and their in-game DJ is Alexis Marchand. When the Senators score a goal, the team's goal horn is a Nathan Airchime M3H from a retired VIA Rail train which was initially used in the Ottawa Civic Centre, and the team's goal song is "Song 2" by Blur. At each game, the Senators spotlight a Canadian veteran soldier.

Like other NHL arenas in Canada, O Canada is sung before the opening faceoff, along with The Star-Spangled Banner if an American team is visiting. O Canada is sung in both English and French with the first half of the first stanza and chorus sung in English and the second half of the first stanza sung in French. From 1994 until 2016, the national anthems were sung by former Ontario Provincial Police Constable Lyndon Slewidge. Currently, the team has no regular singer. During O Canada, a large Canadian flag is unfurled and passed from fan to fan in the lower bowl section.

The Senators have their own theme song titled Trumpeters Cry, which is played as the team comes on the ice and is also used in Sens TV web videos. The song was written by Ottawa singer-songwriter Andres del Castillo, who was formerly of the band Eight Seconds.

=== Attendance, revenue and ownership ===
On April 18, 2008, the club announced its final attendance figures for 2007–08. The club had 40 sell-outs out of 41 home dates, a total attendance of 812,665 during the regular season, placing the club third in attendance in the NHL. The number of sell-outs and the total attendance were both club records. The previous attendance records were set during the 2005–06 with a season total of 798,453 and 33 sell-outs. In the 2006–07 regular season, total attendance was 794,271, with 31 sell-outs out of 41 home dates or an average attendance of 19,372. In the 2007 playoffs, the Senators played nine games with nine sell-outs and an attendance of 181,272 for an average of 20,141, the highest in team history. Until recent seasons, the club was regularly represented in the top half in attendance in the NHL. In 2018–19, the Senators average attendance was 14,553, 27th in the league. Attendance dropped further in the 2019–20 season, dropping to an average of 12,618, the lowest in the league.

In 2022, Forbes magazine valued the Senators at US$800 million. Forbes estimated the debt/value ratio at 25% and that the team earned US$47 million in 2020–21 on revenue of US$157 million. The team is now owned by Michael Andlauer who is the majority owner along with his partners, Eugene Melnyk's daughters, and a group of Canadian businessmen. It was previously owned by Eugene Melynk who bought the team and arena out of bankruptcy in 2003 for US$92 million. Before Melnyk's ownership, the Senators were owned by founder Terrace Investments, majority owned by Rod Bryden, until it filed for bankruptcy in 2002. Terrace Investments initially won the bid for an NHL franchise in 1990.

=== Sens Army ===
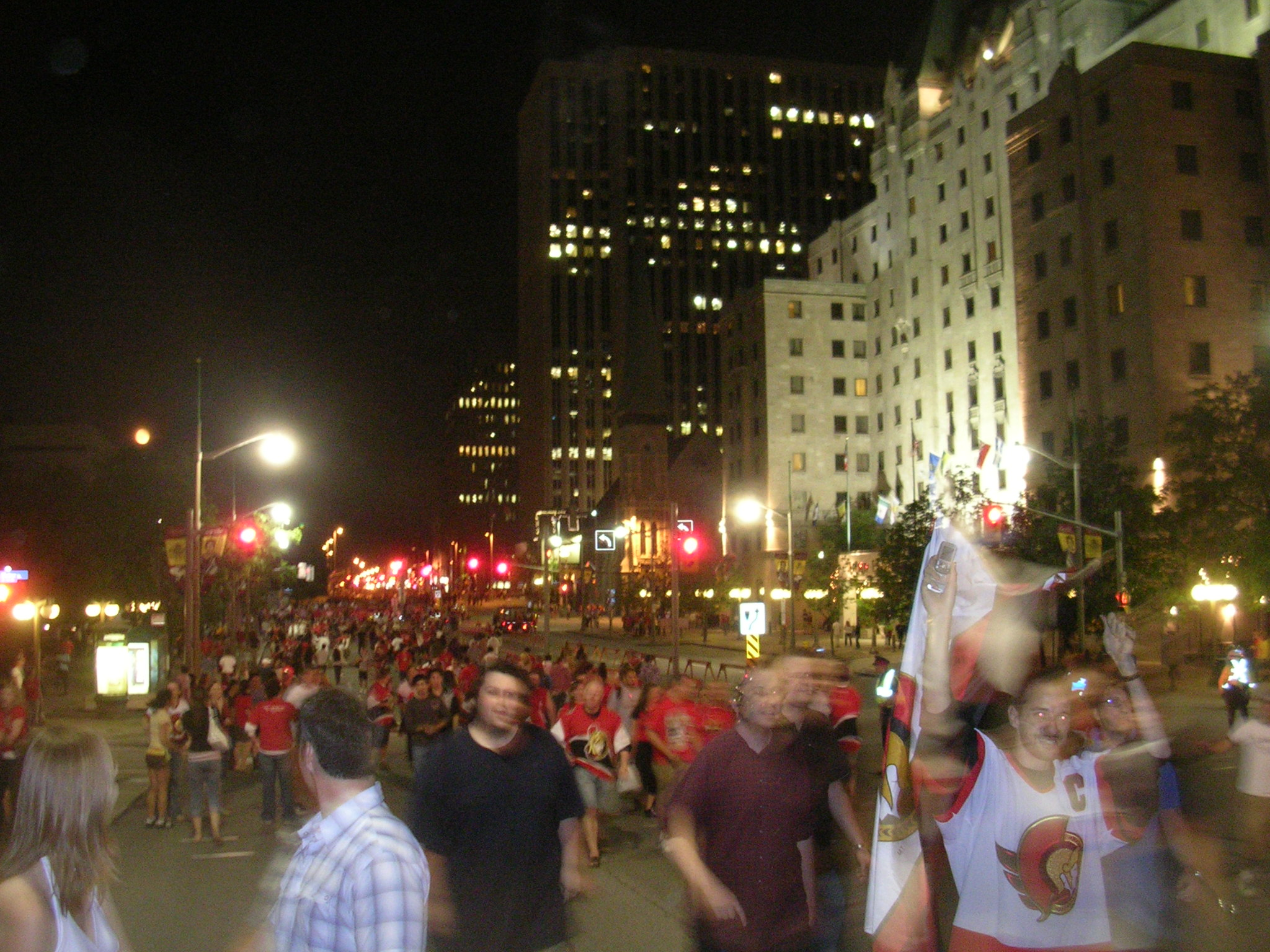
Sens Mile on Elgin Street during the 2007 Stanley Cup playoffs

The fans of the Senators are known as the Sens Army. Like most hockey fanatics, they are known to dress up for games, some in Roman legionary clothing. For the 2006–07 playoff run, more fans than ever before would wear red. Fan activities included 'Red Rallies' of decorated cars, fan rallies at Ottawa City Hall Plaza and the 'Sens Mile' along Elgin Street, where fans would congregate.

==== Sens Mile ====
Much like the Red Mile in Calgary during the Flames' 2004 Stanley Cup run and the Copper Kilometre in Edmonton during the Oilers' 2006 Stanley Cup run, Senators' fans took to the streets to celebrate their team's success during the 2007 playoffs. The idea to have a 'Sens Mile' on downtown Elgin Street, a street with numerous restaurants and pubs, began as a grassroots campaign on Facebook before game four of the Ottawa–Buffalo conference finals series. After the game five win, Ottawa residents closed the street to traffic for a spontaneous celebration. The City of Ottawa then closed Elgin Street for each game of the Stanley Cup Final.

== Season-by-season record ==
This is a partial list of the last five seasons completed by the Senators. For the full season-by-season history, see List of Ottawa Senators seasons

Note: GP = Games Played, W = Wins, L = Losses, T = Ties, OTL = Overtime Losses, Pts = Points, GF = Goals for, GA = Goals against, PIM = Penalties in minutes

Season	GP	W	L	OTL	Pts	GF	GA	Finish	Playoffs
2021–22	82	33	42	7	73	227	266	7th, Atlantic	Did not qualify
2022–23	82	39	35	8	86	261	271	6th, Atlantic	Did not qualify
2023–24	82	37	41	4	78	255	281	7th, Atlantic	Did not qualify
2024–25	82	45	30	7	97	243	234	4th, Atlantic	Lost in first round, 2–4 (Maple Leafs)
2025–26	82	44	27	11	99	278	246	5th, Atlantic	Lost in first round, 0–4 (Hurricanes)

== Players and personnel ==
=== Current roster ===
Updated November 21, 2026

No.	Nat	Player	Pos	S/G	Age	Acquired	Birthplace
22	(Canada)	Michael Amadio	RW	R	30	2024	Sault Ste. Marie, Ontario
19	(Canada)	Drake Batherson	RW	R	28	2017	Fort Wayne, Indiana
79	(Canada)	Sammy Blais	LW	L	30	2026	Montmagny, Quebec
95	(Sweden)	André Burakovsky	LW	L	31	2026	Klagenfurt, Austria
72	(Canada)	Thomas Chabot (C)	D	L	29	2015	Sainte-Marie, Quebec
21	(Canada)	Nick Cousins	C	L	33	2024	Belleville, Ontario
24	(Canada)	Dylan Cozens	C	R	25	2025	Whitehorse, Yukon
27	(Sweden)	William Eklund	LW	L	24	2026	Haninge, Sweden
30	(Sweden)	Samuel Ersson	G	L	27	2026	Falun, Sweden
37	(Canada)	Warren Foegele	LW	L	30	2026	Markham, Ontario
28	(Canada)	Claude Giroux (A)	RW	R	38	2022	Hearst, Ontario
71	(Canada)	Ridly Greig	C	L	24	2020	Calgary, Alberta
34	(Canada)	Stephen Halliday	C	L	24	2022	Ajax, Ontario
42	(Canada)	Hayden Hodgson	RW	R	30	2024	Windsor, Ontario
43	(United States)	Tyler Kleven	D	L	24	2020	Fargo, North Dakota
33	(Finland)	Nikolas Matinpalo	D	R	28	2023	Espoo, Finland
12	(United States)	Shane Pinto	C	R	26	2019	Franklin Square, New York
85	(United States)	Jake Sanderson (A)	D	L	24	2020	Whitefish, Montana
10	(Canada)	Jordan Spence	D	R	25	2025	Sydney, Australia
18	(Germany)	Tim Stützle (A)	C	L	24	2020	Viersen, Germany
62	(Canada)	Philip Tomasino	F	R	25	2026	Mississauga, Ontario
35	(Sweden)	Linus Ullmark	G	L	33	2024	Lugnvik, Sweden
26	(Canada)	Carter Yakemchuk	D	R	21	2024	Fort McMurray, Alberta
20	(Sweden)	Fabian Zetterlund	LW	R	27	2025	Karlstad, Sweden
2	(Russia)	Artem Zub	D	R	31	2020	Khabarovsk, Russia

=== Team captains ===
- Laurie Boschman, 1992–1993
- Mark Lamb and Brad Shaw, 1993–1994 (co-captains)
- Gord Dineen, 1994
- Randy Cunneyworth, 1995–1998
- Alexei Yashin, 1998–1999
- Daniel Alfredsson, 1999–2013
- Jason Spezza, 2013–2014
- Erik Karlsson, 2014–2018
- Brady Tkachuk, 2021–2026
- Thomas Chabot, 2026–present

=== Head coaches ===
- Rick Bowness, 1992–1996
- Dave Allison, 1996
- Jacques Martin, 1996–2004
- Roger Neilson, 2002
- Bryan Murray, 2005–2008
- John Paddock, 2007–2008
- Craig Hartsburg, 2008–2009
- Cory Clouston, 2009–2011
- Paul MacLean, 2011–2014
- Dave Cameron, 2014–2016
- Guy Boucher, 2016–2019
- Marc Crawford, 2019
- D. J. Smith, 2019–2023
- Jacques Martin, 2023–2024
- Travis Green, 2024–present

=== General managers ===
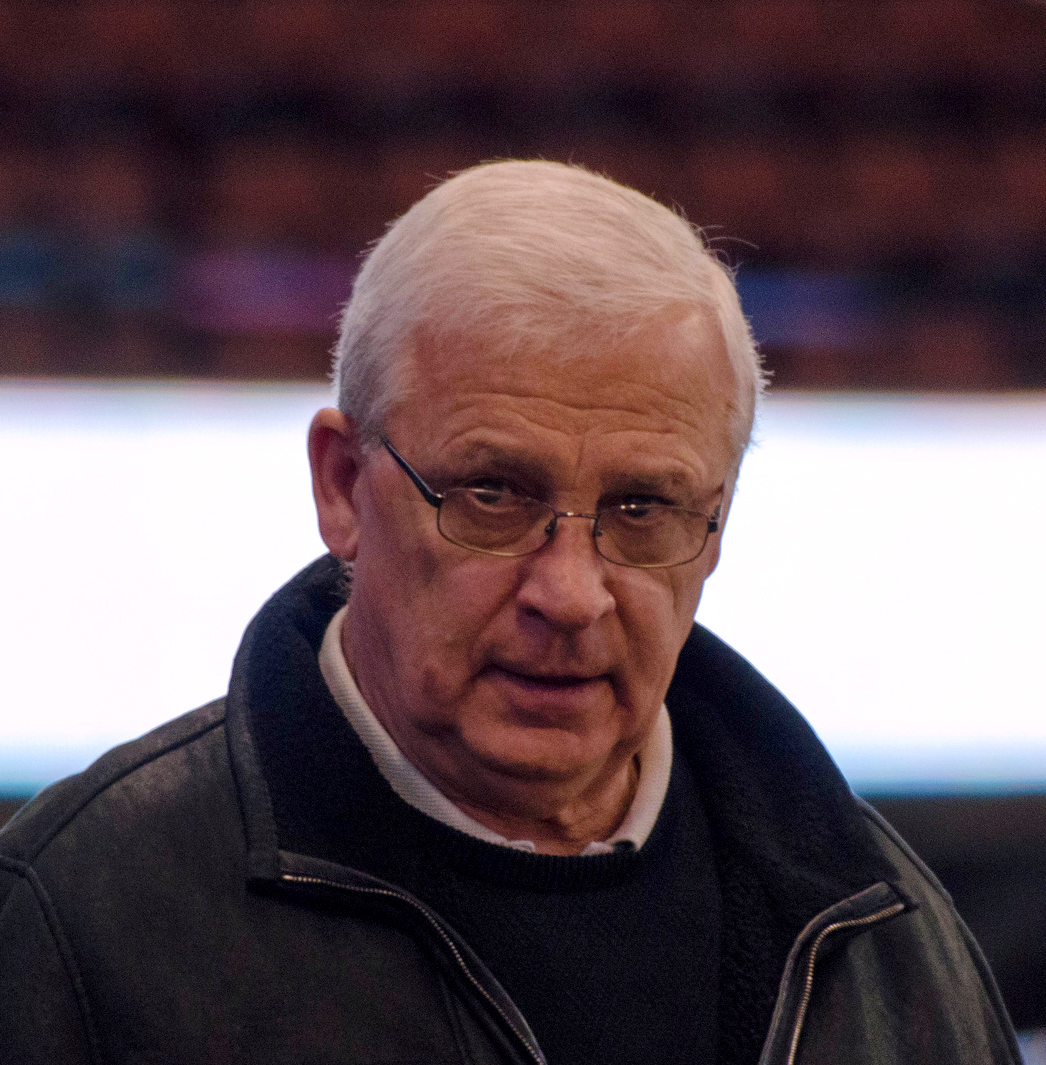
Bryan Murray was the seventh and longest-serving general manager in franchise history. He held the position from 2007 to 2016.

- Mel Bridgman, 1991–1993
- Randy Sexton, 1993–1995
- Pierre Gauthier, 1995–1998
- Rick Dudley, 1998–1999
- Marshall Johnston, 1999–2002
- John Muckler, 2002–2007
- Bryan Murray, 2007–2016
- Pierre Dorion, 2016–2023
- Steve Staios, 2023–present

Source: Ottawa Senators 2009–10 Media Guide, p. 206.

=== Honoured members ===
==== Hall of Fame ====
- Daniel Alfredsson – Senators winger (1995–2013) was inducted in 2022 for his career as a forward.
- Tom Barrasso – Senators' goaltender (2000) was inducted in 2023 for his career as a goaltender.
- Zdeno Chára – Senators' defenceman (2001–2006) was inducted in 2025 for his career as a defenceman.
- Dominik Hašek – Senators' goaltender (2005–2006) was inducted in 2014 for his career as a goaltender.
- Marián Hossa – Senators' winger (1998–2004) was inducted in 2020 (ceremony held in 2021) for his career as a forward.
- Roger Neilson – Senators' assistant coach and head coach (2001–2003) was inducted (as a builder) on November 4, 2002, for his career in coaching.

==== Retired numbers ====
The Senators have retired the numbers of four players. The NHL retired Wayne Gretzky's No. 99 for all its member teams at the 2000 NHL All-Star Game.

Ottawa Senators retired numbers
No.	Player	Position	Career	Date of retirement
4	Chris Phillips	D	1997–2015	February 18, 2020
8	Frank Finnigan	RW	1923–1931; 1932–1934	October 8, 1992 (Note: Finnigan was honoured for his play from 1923 through 1934 for the original Ottawa Senators (playing right wing, 1923–1931 and 1932–1934). He was the last surviving Senator from the Stanley Cup winners of 1927 and participated in the 'Bring Back the Senators' campaign.)
11	Daniel Alfredsson	RW	1995–2013	December 29, 2016
25	Chris Neil	RW	2001–2017	February 17, 2023

==== Ring of Honour ====
- Bryan Murray – Senators' head coach (2005–2008) and general manager (2007–2016).
- Wade Redden – Senators' defenceman (1996–2008) and alternate captain (1999–2008).
- Donald Chow – Senators' physician (1992–present) and head physician (2002–2017).
- Jacques Martin – Senators' head coach (1996–2004, 2023–2024).

== Awards and trophies ==
Prince of Wales Trophy

- 2006–07

Presidents' Trophy

- 2002–03

Calder Memorial Trophy

- Daniel Alfredsson: 1995–96

NHL Plus-Minus Award

- Wade Redden: 2005–06 (shared with Michal Rozsíval of the New York Rangers)

Jack Adams Award

- Jacques Martin: 1998–99
- Paul MacLean: 2012–13

James Norris Memorial Trophy

- Erik Karlsson: 2011–12, 2014–15

King Clancy Memorial Trophy

- Daniel Alfredsson: 2011–12

Mark Messier Leadership Award

- Daniel Alfredsson: 2012–13

Bill Masterton Memorial Trophy

- Craig Anderson: 2016–17
- Bobby Ryan: 2019–20

NHL All-Rookie Team

- Daniel Alfredsson: 1995–96
- Sami Salo: 1998–99
- Marián Hossa: 1998–99
- Martin Havlát: 2000–01
- Andrej Meszároš: 2005–06
- Mark Stone: 2014–15
- Brady Tkachuk: 2018–19
- Josh Norris: 2020–21
- Jake Sanderson: 2022–23

NHL first All-Star team

- Zdeno Chára: 2003–04
- Dany Heatley: 2006–07
- Erik Karlsson: 2011–12, 2014–15, 2015–16, 2016–17

NHL second All-Star team

- Alexei Yashin: 1998–99
- Dany Heatley: 2005–06
- Daniel Alfredsson: 2005–06
- Zdeno Chara: 2005–06

== Team records ==
=== Scoring leaders ===
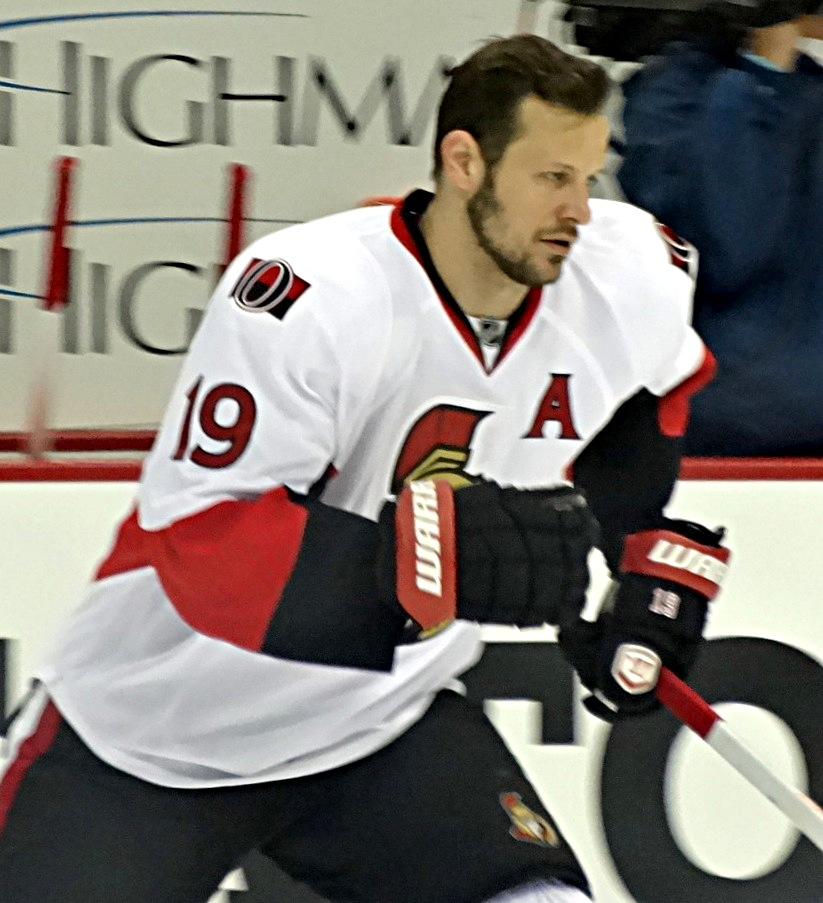
Recording 687 points playing with the Senators, Jason Spezza is the franchise's second-highest all-time points leader.

These are the top 10 regular season point-scorers in franchise history. Figures are updated after each NHL regular season is completed.

- * – current Senators player

Note: Pos = Position; GP = Games played; G = Goals; A = Assists; Pts = Points; P/G = Points per game average

Points
Player	Pos	GP	G	A	Pts	P/G
Daniel Alfredsson	RW	1,178	426	682	1,108	.94
Jason Spezza	C	686	251	436	687	1.00
Erik Karlsson	D	627	126	392	518	.83
Alexei Yashin	C	504	218	273	491	.97
Brady Tkachuk	LW	572	213	250	463	.81
Wade Redden	D	838	101	309	410	.49
Tim Stützle*	C	447	149	260	409	.91
Radek Bonk	C	689	152	247	399	.58
Marián Hossa	RW	467	188	202	390	.84
Drake Batherson*	RW	470	149	215	364	.77

Goals
Player	Pos	G
Daniel Alfredsson	RW	426
Jason Spezza	C	251
Alexei Yashin	C	218
Brady Tkachuk	LW	213
Marián Hossa	RW	188
Dany Heatley	LW	180
Mike Fisher	C	167
Radek Bonk	C	152
Drake Batherson*	RW	149
Tim Stützle*	C	149

Assists
Player	Pos	A
Daniel Alfredsson	RW	682
Jason Spezza	C	436
Erik Karlsson	D	392
Wade Redden	D	309
Alexei Yashin	C	273
Tim Stützle*	C	260
Thomas Chabot*	D	257
Brady Tkachuk	LW	250
Radek Bonk	C	247
Chris Phillips	D	217

Source: Ottawa Senators Media Guide

=== Goaltending leaders ===
These goaltenders rank in the top ten in franchise history for wins. Figures are updated after each completed NHL season.

- * – current Senators player

Note: GP = Games played; W = Wins; L = Losses; T/O = Ties/Overtime losses; GA = Goal against; GAA = Goals against average; SA = Shots against; SV% = Save percentage; SO = Shutouts

Goaltenders
Player	GP	W	L	T/O	GA	GAA	SA	SV%	SO
Craig Anderson	435	202	168	46	1,174	2.84	13,621	.914	28
Patrick Lalime	283	146	100	30	637	2.32	6,920	.908	30
Ron Tugnutt	166	72	51	25	355	2.32	3,789	.906	13
Ray Emery	134	71	40	14	335	2.71	3,614	.907	8
Damian Rhodes	181	65	74	32	439	2.56	4,462	.902	11
Anton Forsberg	142	62	56	10	385	2.99	4,071	.905	8
Brian Elliott	130	59	45	15	330	2.81	3,386	.903	9
Linus Ullmark*	93	53	26	11	243	2.72	2,427	.900	7
Martin Gerber	100	49	36	8	259	2.76	2,800	.908	4
Robin Lehner	86	30	36	13	230	2.88	2,676	.914	2

=== Team records ===
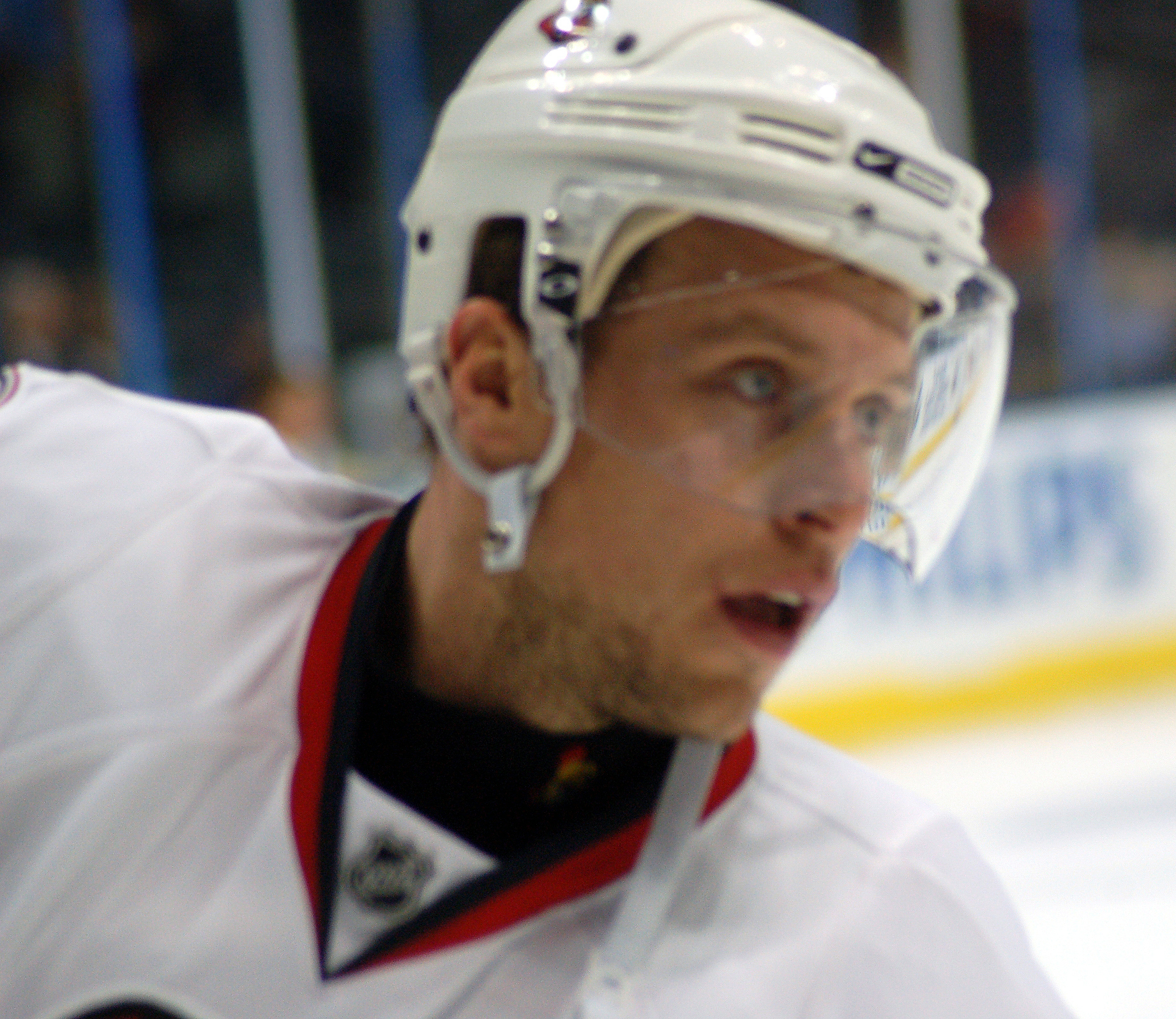
Dany Heatley holds the franchise record for most goals in a season, scoring 50 goals in the 2005–06 and 2006–07 seasons.

- Most goals in a season – Dany Heatley, 50 (2005–06, 2006–07)
- Most goals in a season, defenceman – Erik Karlsson, 21 (2014–15)
- Most assists in a season – Jason Spezza, 71 (2005–06)
- Most assists in a season, defenceman – Erik Karlsson, 66 (2015–16)
- Most points in a season – Dany Heatley, 105 (2006–07)
- Most points in a season, defenceman – Erik Karlsson, 82 (2015–16)
- Most points in a season, rookie – Alexei Yashin, 79 (1993–94)
- Most penalty minutes in a season – Mike Peluso, 318 (1992–93)
- Highest +/– rating in a season – Daniel Alfredsson, +42 (2006–07)
- Most games played – Chris Phillips, 1,179 (up to 2022–23 season)
- Most playoff games played – Daniel Alfredsson, 121 (1997–2013)
- Most goaltender wins in a season – Patrick Lalime, 39 (2002–2003)
- Most shutouts in a season – Patrick Lalime, 8 (2002–03)
- Lowest GAA in a season – Craig Anderson, 1.69 (2012–13)
- Best save percentage in a season – Craig Anderson, .941 (2012–13)

Source: Ottawa Senators.

== Broadcasting ==
Ottawa Senators games are broadcast locally in both the English and French languages. As of the 2014–15 season, regional television rights to the Senators' regular season games not broadcast nationally by Sportsnet, TVA Sports, or Hockey Night in Canada are owned by Bell Media under a 12-year contract, with games airing in English on TSN5, and in French on RDS. Regional broadcasts are available within the team's designated region (shared with the Montreal Canadiens), which includes the Ottawa River valley, Eastern Ontario (portions are shared with the Toronto Maple Leafs), along with Quebec, the Maritime provinces and Newfoundland and Labrador.

The Ottawa Senators broadcast area in blue and green

On radio, all home and away games are broadcast on a five-station network stretching across Eastern Ontario, including one American station, WQTK in Ogdensburg, New York. The flagship radio station is CFGO in Ottawa. Radio broadcasts on CFGO began in 1997–98; the contract has since been extended through the 2025–2026 as part of Bell Media's rights deal with the team. The Senators are broadcast on radio in French through Intersport Production and CJFO-FM in Ottawa. Nicolas St. Pierre provides play-by-play, with Alain Sanscartier as colour commentator.

Sportsnet East held English regional rights to the Sens before the 2014–15 season. In April 2014, Dean Brown, who had called play-by-play for Senators games since the team's inception, stated that it was "extremely unlikely" that he would move to TSN and continue his role. He noted that the network already had four commentators among its personalities – including Gord Miller, Chris Cuthbert, Rod Black, and Paul Romanuk (who was, however, picked up by Rogers for its national NHL coverage in June 2014), who were likely candidates to serve as the new voices of the Senators. Brown ultimately moved to the Senators' radio broadcasts alongside Gord Wilson. Both Miller and Cuthbert, along with Ray Ferraro and Jamie McLennan, became the Senators' TV voices on TSN from 2014 to 2020. After Cuthbert joined Sportsnet in 2020, former Canucks radio voice Jon Abbott took over as the secondary play-by-play commentator in games where Miller is assigned to call the Maple Leafs. Mike Johnson, who concurrently works colour commentary for the Canadiens and Maple Leafs on TSN, replaced Ferraro as an alternate to McLennan. After Abbott left to join the Calgary Flames in 2024, broadcaster Matt Cullen and Kenzie Lalonde split time as the backup to Miller.

During the 2006–07 and 2007–08 seasons, several games were only available in video on pay-per-view or at local movie theatres in the Ottawa area. The "Sens TV" service was suspended indefinitely as of September 24, 2008. In 2010, Sportsnet launched a secondary channel for selected Senators games as part of its Sportsnet One service. Selected Senators games were broadcast in French by RDS and TVA Sports. On the RDS network, Felix Seguin and former Senators goaltender Patrick Lalime were the announcers from the 2011–12 season to the 2013–14 season, and Michel Y. Lacroix and Norman Flynn starting in the 2014–15 season. The TVA Sports broadcast team consisted of Michel Langevin, Yvon Pedneault and Enrico Ciccone.

== See also ==
- Bell Sensplex
- List of Ottawa Senators players
- List of Ottawa Senators draft picks
- List of ice hockey teams in Ontario
- Lyndon Slewidge

== Bibliography ==
- Finnigan, Joan (1992). Old Scores, New Goals: The Story of the Ottawa Senators. Quarry Press. ISBN 1-55082-041-9.
- Garrioch, Bruce (1998). "Ottawa Senators, 1992–93 to date". Total Hockey. Total Sports. pp. 225–227. ISBN 0-8362-7114-9.
- MacGregor, Roy (1993). Road games : a year in the life of the NHL. Macfarlane Walter & Ross. ISBN 0-921912-58-7.
